= Angus Macdonald =

Angus Macdonald, MacDonald, or McDonald may refer to:

== Chiefs of Clan Donald and its Septs ==
- Aonghus Mór (died c. 1293), first chief of Clan Donald
- Aonghus Óg of Islay (died 1314×1318/c.1330), son of the above, chief of Clan Donald
- Aonghas Óg (died 1490), last Lord of the Isles
- Angus MacDonald, 8th of Dunnyveg (died 1614), chief of Clan MacDonald of Dunnyveg
- Angus Og MacDonald (d.1615), his son

== Military ==
- Angus McDonald (Virginia militiaman) (1727–1778), Scottish American military officer, frontiersman, and sheriff in Virginia, U.S.
- Angus McDonald (United States Army major) (1769–1814), American military officer and planter in Virginia, U.S.
- Angus William McDonald (1799–1864), American military officer and lawyer in Virginia, U.S.

== Politics ==
=== Canada ===
- Angus Peter McDonald (1813–1889), Canadian Conservative MP for Middlesex West
- Angus J. MacDonald (1848–1914), merchant and political figure in Nova Scotia
- Angus McDonald (politician, born 1867) (1867–1926), Canadian independent MP for Timiskaming
- Angus L. Macdonald (1890–1954), Canadian liberal MP for Kingston, and Premier of Nova Scotia
- Angus Ronald Macdonald (1901–1970), Canadian conservative MP for Antigonish—Guysborough

=== Other countries ===
- Gus Macdonald (born 1940), Scottish member of the House of Lords
- Angus MacDonald (SNP politician) (born 1963), member of the Scottish Parliament
- Angus MacDonald (Liberal Democrat politician), member of the UK Parliament

== Sports ==
- Angus McDonald (footballer) (1890–1953), Australian rules footballer
- Monk McDonald (Angus McDonald, 1901–1977), American college athlete
- Angus Macdonald (rugby union) (born 1981), New Zealand rugby player
- Angus MacDonald (footballer) (born 1992), English football player

== Others ==
- Angus Macdonald (obstetrician) (1836–1886), Scottish physician and lecturer
- Angus MacDonald (bishop) (1844–1900), Roman Catholic Archbishop of St Andrews and Edinburgh
- Angus MacDonald (piper) (1938-1999), Scottish bagpiper and composer
- Angus Daniel McDonald (1878–1941), president of the Southern Pacific Company
- Angus Snead Macdonald (fl. 1915–1962), American librarian
- Angus MacDonald (born c.1950), Scottish piper of the MacDonald Brothers
- Angus McDonald (artist) (born 1961), Australian painter
- Angus McDonald, songwriter and co-founder of Australian group Sneaky Sound System
