= Archibald Macdonald (disambiguation) =

Archibald, Archie or Arch Macdonald, MacDonald or McDonald may refer to:

- Sir Archibald Macdonald, 1st Baronet (1747–1826), British lawyer and politician
- Archibald Macdonald (Canadian politician) (died 1872), politician in Upper Canada
- Archibald MacDonald, Governor of British Honduras during the 19th century
- Archibald MacDonald, 7th of Dunnyveg (fl. 1560), clan chief of Clan MacDonald of Dunnyveg
- Archibald McDonald (1790–1853), Hudson's Bay Company fur trader
- Archibald McDonald (Canadian politician) (1849–1933), merchant and politician in British Columbia, Canada
- Archibald John Macdonald (Prince Edward Island politician) (1834–1917), merchant and politician in Prince Edward Island, Canada
- Archibald John Macdonald (1876–1938), merchant and politician in Ontario, Canada
- Archie Macdonald (1904–1983), Scottish businessperson and politician
- Archie MacDonald (wrestler) (1895–1965), British Olympic wrestler
- Archie P. McDonald (1935–2012), American historian from Texas
- Arch McDonald (1901–1960), American radio broadcaster for the Washington Senators
- Arch MacDonald (1911–1985), Boston based American broadcast journalist
- Arch McDonald (footballer) (1882–1932), Australian rules footballer
- Archibald McDonald (Australian politician) (1872–1962), South Australian politician
- Archie MacDonald, a fictional character in the BBC TV series Monarch of the Glen
- Archibald MacDonald of Gigha (died 1618), Scottish landowner
- Sir Archibald Macdonald, 3rd Baronet (1820–1901), English cricketer and British Army officer
