= Alexander MacDonald =

Alexander or Alex MacDonald may refer to:

== Politics ==
- Alasdair Óg of Islay (died 1299), Lord of Islay and chief of Clann Domhnaill
- Alexander of Islay, Earl of Ross, or Alexander MacDonald (died 1449), Scottish nobleman
- Alexander MacDonald, 5th of Dunnyveg (died 1538), Scoto-Irish chieftain
- Alexander Og MacDonald (died 1613), chief of the MacDonalds of Dunnyveg
- Alexander Macdonald, 17th of Keppoch (died 1746), Scottish clan chief, military officer, and prominent Jacobite
- Alexander Macdonald, 1st Baron Macdonald (died 1795), Scottish peer
- Alexander Macdonald, 2nd Baron Macdonald (1773–1824), Scottish peer and Member of Parliament
- Alexander Francis Macdonald (1818–1913), politician and railway contractor
- Alexander Macdonald (Lib–Lab politician) (1821–1881), Scottish miner, teacher, trade union leader and Lib-Lab politician
- Alexander Macdonald (Manitoba politician) (1844–1928), Canadian politician, Mayor of Winnipeg in 1892
- Alexander Macdonald, 7th Baron Macdonald (1909–1970), grandson of 6th Baron Macdonald
- Alexander Macdonald (British Columbia politician) (1918–2014), Canadian MP for Vancouver Kingsway
- Alexander Macdonald (New York politician) (1867–1935), Canadian-American politician and conservationist
- Alex Macdonald (trade unionist) (1910–1969), Australian trade unionist

== Other ==
- Alasdair mac Mhaighstir Alasdair (1698–1770), known in English as Alexander MacDonald, Scottish poet
- Alexander Macdonald (antiquary) (1791–1850), Scottish antiquarian and editor
- Alexander MacDonald (Scottish bishop) (1736–1791), Roman Catholic bishop and vicar apostolic in Scotland
- Alexander Macdonald (artist) (1849–1921), first Ruskin Master at the University of Oxford
- Alexander MacDonald (Canadian bishop) (1858–1941), Canadian Roman Catholic bishop, educator and author
- Alexander Macdonald (Presbyterian minister) (1885–1960), Scottish minister and Moderator of the General Assembly of the Church of Scotland
- Alex Bath MacDonald (1898–1981), Australian Army officer
- Alex MacDonald (footballer, born 1948), Scottish football player and manager
- Alex MacDonald (footballer, born 1990), Scottish football player
- Alex MacDonald (cricketer), English cricketer
- Alexander MacDonald (journalist), (1908–2000), American journalist, OSS officer, and co-founder of the Bangkok Post

== See also ==
- Alexander Og MacDonald (disambiguation)
- Alexander McDonald (disambiguation)
- Alex McDonald (disambiguation)
