= Alexander Carragh MacDonald of Glenarm =

Alexander Carragh MacDonald of Glenarm was a son of James MacDonald, 6th of Dunnyveg and Agnes Campbell, daughter of Colin Campbell, 3rd Earl of Argyll. Alexander, obtained possession of the barony of Glenarm. He was killed along with his brother, Donald Gorm, during the Battle of Ardnaree, Ireland in 1586 against the English.

== Family ==
Alexander had issue:

- Ranald, who had issue; Archibald, who was killed at Broughbuy, Glenarm.
