= Mulindry House =

Coordinates: 55.7609°N 6.2028°W

Mulindry House, also known as Caisteal Mhic Dhomhnuill or Mullintrae House, was a fortified house north of Mulindry Farm, Islay, Scotland.

== History ==
=== 16th century ===
Angus MacDonald, 8th of Dunnyveg invited Sir Lachlan Mor Maclean, chief of Clan MacLean who was visiting his estates in Islay, to his home at Mulindry in 1586. Sir Lachlan was reluctant to go, however as he had Angus's son James and brother Ranald as hostages, he agreed to visit Angus at Mulindry. He brought with him 86 followers and Angus's son James, while Ranald was left in chains at Duart Castle. A banquet was held and after Sir Lachlan was lodged in an adjoining residence, the house was surrounded by between 300 or 400 armed men. Angus called for Sir Lachlan to come out and face him in combat, however, Sir Lachlan came to the door with Angus's son James. James pleaded with his father to spare his uncle and Angus agreed to hold Sir Lachlan as a prisoner.

Sir Lachlan was held prisoner in a chamber at Mulindry, while his retinue were persuaded to surrender upon assurances that their lives would be spared. Two refused, a relative of Sir Lauchlan's and the outlaw MacDhomhnuill Herraich of Clan Uisdein, and were set upon and withdrew into the adjoining house and perished when that house was burnt to the ground. After news of Sir Lachlan's capture had become known, a rumour was started by Allan Maclean, a kinsman of Sir Lachlan, who had hoped to gain influence should Sir Lachlan be killed, that Ranald who was being held a Duart had been killed in retaliation. Ranald and Angus's brother Coll was incensed by this news and two of the Maclean prisoners were executed every day, until at last only Sir Lauchlan and John Dubh of Morvern remained. Sir Lachlan was released after Angus received a large number of hostages and the release of Ranald.
