= Ranald Og MacDonald =

Ranald Og MacDonald was a son of Angus MacDonald, 8th of Dunnyveg. He captured Dunyvaig Castle in 1614 from the constable Andrew Knox and royal garrison. Dunyvaig was retaken by his brother Angus Og.
