= Coll MacDonald =

Coll MacDonald was a son of James MacDonald, 6th of Dunnyveg and Agnes Campbell, daughter of Colin Campbell, 3rd Earl of Argyll. Upon mistakenly hearing that his brother, Ranald MacDonald of Smerby, had been killed at Duart Castle under orders of Sir Lachlan Mor Maclean, he executed 86 of Maclean's kinsfolk and servants at Mullintrae. Coll died at Eilean Mor, Knapdale. The rumour had been deliberately started by Allan Maclean, a magnate among the Macleans, who had hoped the rumour would cause Lachlan's death, which would have enabled him to increase his own influence.

Coll children were:

- Donald Gorm
- Alastair Carrach
