= Angus Og =

Angus Og or Angus the younger may refer to:

- Aengus, Celtic God of Love
- Angus Og (comic strip)
- Aonghus Óg of Islay (died 1314×1318/c.1330), Scottish magnate
- Aonghas Óg (d. 1490), bastard son of John of Islay, Earl of Ross and Lord of the Isles
- Angus Og MacDonald (d.1615)
- Aonghus Óg McAnally, (born 1980), Irish actor
