= Thomas Knox (bishop) =

Scottish prelate

- Bishop of the Isles
- Church: Church of Scotland
- See: Diocese of the Isles
- In office: 1619–1627x1628
- Predecessor: Andrew Knox
- Successor: John Leslie
- Previous post(s): Dean of the Isles

Personal details
- Born: unknown unknown
- Died: 1627 or 1628
- Spouse: Prudence Benson
- Children: Thomas

Thomas Knox (1588–1628) was a Scottish prelate from the 17th century who served as Bishop of the Isles.

== Life ==
He was born in 1588 the son of Andrew Knox, Bishop of the Isles, and Elizabeth ("Bessie") Knox, his cousin. He was educated at Glasgow University graduating MA in 1608.

He received crown provision to the Deanery of the Isles on 4 August 1617 and started serving as a minister on Tiree in 1618. He is the first Dean of the Isles to be known by name (apart from the famous Dean Monro, a century earlier), though an unnamed cathedral dean was recorded in 1572, and the "dean and chapter of Iona" are attested again on 5 June 1576.

On 24 February 1619 he was granted crown provision to succeed his father as Bishop of the Isles, his father later becoming Bishop of Raphoe in Ireland. Thomas Knox's last historical appearance dates to 1 November 1627, a year later than the date given by Robert Keith. He had died by 3 April 1628, meaning he almost certainly died earlier in that year or at most in 1627.

== Family and descendants ==
He married in 1625 Prudence Benson, daughter of the wealthy builder and architect Peter Benson of London, who moved to Ireland, oversaw the building of the Walls of Derry, and played a prominent role in the Plantation of Ulster. Her mother was probably his first wife, Jane Hobson of Lincolnshire. Thomas and Prudence had a son, also named Thomas. Her father, who died in 1642, left legacies to Prudence and her son. The eventual heiress of the family Catherine Knox married John Grogan of Johnstown Castle, County Wexford, in about 1736 and was the mother of the United Irishman Cornelius Grogan, who was hanged for his part in the Irish Rebellion of 1798.

Religious titles
Preceded by unknown	Dean of the Isles; 1617–1619	Succeeded by Patrick Stewart
Preceded by Andrew Knox	Bishop of the Isles; 1619–1627x1628	Succeeded by John Leslie
