= John Campbell, 3rd of Cawdor =

Scottish nobleman and knight

Sir John Campbell (c. 1576 – c. 1642) was a Scottish nobleman and knight, who was the son of Archibald Campbell, and Isabella Grant, a daughter of James Grant, laird of Freuchie and Elizabeth Forbes.

Angus MacDonald, 8th of Dunnyveg sold the lands belonging to the MacDonald's on Islay to Sir John Campbell of Cawdor for 6,000 merks in 1612. Several young chiefs of Clan MacDonald occupied Dunyvaig Castle and Loch Gorm Castle in defiance of Cawdor. Dunyvaig Castle was retaken by Cawdor and Loch Gorm Castle surrendered on 28 January 1615. He purchased the lands on Islay and Jura which had previously belonged to the Macleans of Duart in 1615.

== Family ==
By his wife, Jean, daughter of Sir Duncan Campbell, Baronet and Jean Stewart, their children were:

- John Campbell
- Jane Campbell
- Colin Campbell
- Robert Campbell
- George Campbell
- Duncan Campbell
- Alexander Campbell
- Jean Campbell
