= List of shipwrecks in May 1870 =

The list of shipwrecks in May 1870 includes ships sunk, foundered, grounded, or otherwise lost during May 1870.

== 1 May ==
List of shipwrecks: 1 May 1870
Ship	State	Description
City of Quebec	Canada	The Paddle steamer collided with the steamship Germany (United Kingdom) and sank in the Saint Lawrence River with the loss of two lives. She was on a voyage from Quebec City to Pictou, Nova Scotia.
Jean McLean	United Kingdom	The sloop was driven ashore at Machrie, Isle of Arran.

== 2 May ==
List of shipwrecks: 2 May 1870
Ship	State	Description
Coringa	United Kingdom	The ship was driven ashore in Morte Bay. She was on a voyage from Havre de Grâce, Seine-Inférieure, France to Bombay, India. She was refloated and taken in to Newport, Monmouthshire in a leaky condition.
Jean McLean	United Kingdom	The ship was driven ashore in Macrie Bay.
Maria Danovara	Italy	The barque was destroyed by fire off Saint Vincent. She was on a voyage from Carloforte, Sardinia to Swansea, Glamorgan, United Kingdom.

== 3 May ==
List of shipwrecks: 3 May 1870
Ship	State	Description
Carl	Rostock	The brig was abandoned in the Mediterranean Sea 3 leagues (9 nautical miles (17 km) west of Ténès, Algeria. She was on a voyage from Catanzaro, Italy to Hull, Yorkshire, United Kingdom. She came ashore and was wrecked.
City of Lahore	India	The ship ran aground on the Roypore Sand, in the Hooghly River. She was on a voyage from the Clyde to Calcutta. She was refloated and taken in to Calcutta.
Eos	United Kingdom	The ship ran aground in the Doboy Sound. She was on a voyage from Cardiff to Brunswick, Georgia, United States. She was later refloated and taken in to Darien, Georgia.
Hackmatac	United Kingdom	The ship ran aground on a reef in the Hainan Strait. She was attacked by pirates the next day and was abandoned by her passengers and crew. Hackmatac was plundered and burnt. She was on a voyage from Bangkok, Siam to "Hoiho", China.
St. Austell	United Kingdom	The ship was driven ashore in Algoa Bay. She was on a voyage from Mauritius to Algoa Bay.

== 5 May ==
List of shipwrecks: 5 May 1870
Ship	State	Description
Apostle Peter	United Kingdom	The ship collided with Bona Fide (United Kingdom) and foundered off St. George's Island, Devon.
Commerce	United Kingdom	The schooner was damaged by fire in the Stonehouse Pool, Plymouth, Devon.
Hugh Taylor	United Kingdom	The ship ran aground on the Englishman's Shoal, in the Dardanelles. She was on a voyage from Antwerp, Belgium to Taganrog, Russia. She was refloated on 7 May and resumed her voyage.
Meg	United Kingdom	The brig was driven ashore at New Carlisle, Quebec, Canada. She was on a voyage from Liverpool, Lancashire to Chaleur Bay. She was refloated.
Richard	(United Kingdom of Great Britain and Ireland) Jersey	The ship departed from Porto, Portugal for Burin, Newfoundland Colony. No further trace, presumed foundered with the loss of all hands.

== 6 May ==
List of shipwrecks: 6 May 1870
Ship	State	Description
Dunmail	United Kingdom	The ship struck a sunken rock at Hong Kong and sank. She was on a voyage from London to Hong Kong.
Earl of Elgin	United Kingdom	The steamship was run into by the steamship Jesmond (United Kingdom) and sank in the North Sea 8 nautical miles (15 km) off Huntcliffe Foot, Yorkshire with the loss of eight of the twenty people on board. Survivors were rescued by Jesmond. Earl of Elgin was on a voyage from Sunderland, County Durham to Bordeaux, Gironde, France.
Five Sisters	United Kingdom	The brig was abandoned 25 nautical miles (46 km) west of "Cape Aspinal". Her crew were rescued. She was on a voyage from Pomaron, Portugal to Gloucester.
Iduna	United Kingdom	The ship was sighted in the South China Sea whilst on a voyage from Singapore, Straits Settlements to Hong Kong. No further trace, presumed foundered with the loss of all hands.

== 7 May ==
List of shipwrecks: 7 May 1870
Ship	State	Description
Jeune Victoire	France	The ship collided with the steamship James Shaw (United Kingdom) and sank at Rouen, Seine-Inférieure.
Sarah Nicholson	United States	The ship ran aground east of Bermuda. She was on a voyage from Shanghai, China to New York. She was refloated with assistance from a pilot boat.
Southern Eagle	United Kingdom	The ship departed from Rangoon, Burma for Liverpool, Lancashire. No further trace, presumed foundered with the loss of all hands.

== 9 May ==
List of shipwrecks: 9 May 1870
Ship	State	Description
Caractacus	United Kingdom	The ship was wrecked off Drummond Island.
Hay	United Kingdom	The steamship was wrecked off Hainan, China. She was on a voyage from Hong Kong to Manila, Spanish East Indies.
HMS Slaney	Royal Navy	The Algerine-class gunboat was wrecked in the Paracel Islands in the South China Sea during a typhoon with the loss of 41 of her crew.

== 11 May ==
List of shipwrecks: 11 May 1870
Ship	State	Description
Garibaldi	United Kingdom	The paddle tug collided with Susan (United Kingdom) and sank at Leith, Lothian.
Lady of the Lake	United Kingdom	The smack foundered in Giltar Sound. The sole crew member on board survived. She was on a voyage from Lydstep Haven, to Tenby, Pembrokeshire.
Maria	United Kingdom	The ship foundered off Cape St. Vincent, Portugal. Her crew were rescued by the barque Eros (Norway). Maria was on a voyage from Villareal, Spain to the River Tyne.
Mary Ann	United Kingdom	The lighter sank near Carradale, Argyllshire. Her crew survived. She was on a voyage from Rothesay, Isle of Bute to Campbeltown, Argyllshire.
St. Rolla	United Kingdom	The ship was driven ashore at Cairnryan, Wigtownshire. She was refloated.
Telegraphe	(France) Martinique	The ship was wrecked near Le Vauclin. She was on a voyage from Saint-Pierre to Robert.
Walter Scott	Norway	The barque ran aground at Hartlepool, County Durham, United Kingdom. She was refloated.

== 12 May ==
List of shipwrecks: 12 May 1870
Ship	State	Description
Agnes	United Kingdom	The ship sank off Carradale, Argyllshire.
Cygnet	United Kingdom	The smack collided with Architecht (United Kingdom) and sank off Point Lynas, Anglesey. Her crew were rescued. She was on a voyage from Porthleven, Cornwall to Liverpool, Lancashire.
Effort	United Kingdom	The schooner foundered in St Bride's Bay. Her crew were rescued. She was on a voyage from Cardiff, Glamorgan to Waterford.
Eliza	United Kingdom	The ship was driven ashore and wrecked at Berehaven, County Cork. Her crew were rescued. She was on a voyage from Swansea, Glamorgan to Berehaven .
Henrietta	United Kingdom	The ship was driven ashore in the Kenmare River.
Ida Maria	Danzig	The barque ran aground on the Little Burbo Bank, in Liverpool Bay. All fourteen people on board were rescued by the New Brighton Lifeboat Willie and Arthur ( Royal National Lifeboat Institution) Ida Maria floated off and ran aground on Taylor's Bank. She was refloated and towed in to Liverpool.
Idmarel	United Kingdom	The barque was driven ashore at New Brighton, Cheshire. Her fourteen crew were rescued by the New Brighton Lifeboat.
Julia Curtoise	France	The schooner was wrecked on Caldy Island, Pembrokeshire, United Kingdom. Her crew were rescued. She was on a voyage from Granville, Manche to llanelli, Glamorgan, United Kingdom.
Love	United Kingdom	The schooner foundered off Skrinkle Head, Pembrokeshire with the loss of all hands.
Margarets	United Kingdom	The brig was wrecked at Steinort, Prussia. Her crew were rescued. She was on a voyage from Swinemünde, Prussia to Riga, Russia.
Mary and Jane	United Kingdom	The ship was driven ashore and severely damaged on Mutton Island, County Clare. She was on a voyage from Saundersfoot, Pembrokeshire to Limerick. She was refloated.
Queen of the Taff	United Kingdom	The ship was wrecked at Rio Real, Brazil. Her crew were rescued. She was on a voyage from Rio de Janeiro to Pará, Brazil.

== 13 May ==
List of shipwrecks: 13 May 1870
Ship	State	Description
Catherine	United Kingdom	The ship was driven ashore in the Bay of Luce. She was on a voyage from Liverpool, Lancashire to Peel, Isle of Man.
Immanuel	United Kingdom	The ship was driven ashore at West Wemyss, Fife.
Sicily Juliette	France	The barque was wrecked on the Anegada Reef, off Tortola. She was on a voyage from Philadelphia, Pennsylvania, United States to Saint Thomas, Virgin Islands.
Teutonia	Hamburg	The steamship ran aground at Havre de Grâce, Seine-Inférieure, France. She was on a voyage from New Orleans, Louisiana, United States to Hamburg.

== 14 May ==
List of shipwrecks: 14 May 1870
Ship	State	Description
Chronos	Netherlands	The ship struck a sunken wreck and sank in the Vlie.
Dublin Lass	United Kingdom	The ship was wrecked on the Longsand, in the North Sea off the coast of Essex. Her crew were rescued. She was on a voyage from Guernsey, Channel Islands to London.

== 15 May ==
List of shipwrecks: 15 May 1870
Ship	State	Description
Kestrel	United Kingdom	The steamship ran aground on the Cross Sand, in the North Sea off the coast of Norfolk. Her passengers were transferred to the steamship Lord Cardigan (United Kingdom). Kestrel was later refloated.
Titia Jacobina	Netherlands	The ship collided with Marianne ( Danzig) and was abandoned off Bornholm. She was subsequently taken in to Kristiansand, Denmark.

== 16 May ==
List of shipwrecks: 16 May 1870
Ship	State	Description
Carmino	Italy	The brig was driven ashore on Heligoland.
Eagle	United Kingdom	The ship was driven ashore at Saint-Nazaire, Loire-Inférieure, France. She was on a voyage from Callao, Peru to Saint-Nazaire.
Faugh-a-Ballaugh	United Kingdom	The ship foundered 40 nautical miles (74 km) off the Bishop Rock, Isles of Scilly. Her crew were rescued.
Julie	United Kingdom	The ship was wrecked on Caldy Island, Pembrokeshire. Her crew were rescued. She was on a voyage from Granville, Manche to Llanelly, Glamorgan.

== 17 May ==
List of shipwrecks: 17 May 1870
Ship	State	Description
City of London	United Kingdom	The ship was wrecked on the Barnhourie Bank, in the Solway Firth. Her crew were rescued. She was on a voyage from Trinidad to the Clyde.
Emily	United Kingdom	The brigantine ran aground on the Brake Sand. She was refloated and resumed her voyage.
George and Mary Coyles	United Kingdom	The smack ran aground and capsized in the Solway Firth with the loss of both crew. She was on a voyage from Carsethorn, Kirkcudbrightshire to Maryport, Cumberland.
Sarah	United Kingdom	The schooner ran aground on the Cockle Sand, in the North Sea off the coast of Norfolk. She was on a voyage from Seaham, County Durham to Ipswich, Suffolk. She was refloated and resumed her voyage.
Thomas Hope	United Kingdom	The ship ran aground on the Spykerplaat. She was on a voyage from London to Ghent, East Flanders, Belgium.
West Riding	United Kingdom	The ship was driven ashore near Akyab, Burma and was abandoned by her crew. She was on a voyage from Akyab to an English port. She was refloated the next day and taken in to Akyab.
Unnamed	Flag unknown	The schooner was run into and sunk in the Atlantic Ocean 33 nautical miles (61 km) south by west of Cape Clear Island, County Cork, United Kingdom by the full-rigged ship Herculaneum (United Kingdom).

== 18 May ==
List of shipwrecks: 18 May 1870
Ship	State	Description
Collingwood	United Kingdom	The ship sank in the River Ouse downstream of Selby, Yorkshire. She was on a voyage from London to York.
Shamrock	United Kingdom	The ship was driven ashore near Ballantrae, Ayrshire. She was on a voyage from Chester, Cheshire to Ballantrae.
Wigtownshire	United Kingdom	The ship sank near Lagos, Portugal. Her crew were rescued by the steamship Don Luiz (Portugal). Wigtownshire was on a voyage from Pomaron, Portugal to Liverpool.
William Allen	Canada	The barque was sunk by ice. Her crew were rescued. She was on a voyage from Liverpool to Harbour Grace, Nova Scotia.

== 20 May ==
List of shipwrecks: 20 May 1870
Ship	State	Description
Hope	United Kingdom	The schooner foundered off St. Govans Head, Pembrokeshire. Her crew were rescued.
Professor Schweigard	Flag unknown	The ship ran aground on the Goodwin Sands, Kent, United Kingdom. She was on a voyage from South Shields, County Durham, United Kingdom to Corfu, Greece.
Sarah	United Kingdom	The ship was driven ashore at West Hartlepool, County Durham. She was on a voyage from Sunderland, County Durham to Ostend, West Flanders, Belgium.

== 21 May ==
List of shipwrecks: 21 May 1870
Ship	State	Description
America	United Kingdom	The barque was run into by Marpisa (United Kingdom) 5 nautical miles (9.3 km) off the Saltees Lightship ( Trinity House) and sank. Her crew were rescued by Marpisa. America was on a voyage from Trinidad to Glasgow, Renfrewshire.
Asterias	United States	The barque exploded and sank in the Bristol Channel off Lundy Island, Devon, United Kingdom with the loss of two of her seventeen crew. Survivors were rescued by the schooner Beryl (United Kingdom). Asterias was on a voyage from Cardiff, Glamorgan, United Kingdom to Hong Kong.
Bridgewater	United Kingdom	The ship was driven ashore near Stranraer, Wigtownshire. Hrt crew were rescued. She was on a voyage from Belfast, County Antrim to Maryport, Cumberland.
Dorothea	United Kingdom	The ship was wrecked at Thisted, Denmark. Her crew were rescued. She was on a voyage from Hull, Yorkshire to Copenhagen, Denmark.
Ellen Ball	United Kingdom	The ship ran aground and sank at Villareal, Spain. She was on a voyage from Villareal to Liverpool, Lancashire.
Selskar	United Kingdom	The brig was driven ashore near Castletown, Isle of Man. She was on a voyage from Liverpool to "Wadsoe".
Willie	United Kingdom	The schooner was wrecked near Lucea, Jamaica. The wreck was plundered by the local inhabitants.
Warden Law	United Kingdom	The barque foundered in the Atlantic Ocean. Her crew were rescued by the barque Nathaniel (Norway). Warden Law was on a voyage from Sunderland, County Durham to New York, United States.

== 23 May ==
List of shipwrecks: 23 May 1870
Ship	State	Description
Anna Maria	Netherlands	The brig foundered in the South Atlantic. Her crew were rescued by the schooner Solide (Netherlands). Anna Maria was on a voyage from the Arroyo Negro, Uruguay to Falmouth, Cornwall, United Kingdom.
Mabrookah	Ottoman Empire	The brig was wrecked on the Egyptian coast. She was on a voyage from Damietta to Alexandria.
Willie	United Kingdom	The schooner was wrecked near Lucea, Jamaica. She was on a voyage from New York to a port in British Honduras.

== 24 May ==
List of shipwrecks: 24 May 1870
Ship	State	Description
Diana	United Kingdom	The ship sank in the Ísafjarðardjúp. Her crew were rescued. She was on a voyage from Maryport, Cumberland to the Josfjarð.
Harvest Home	United Kingdom	The ship was driven ashore on Öland, Sweden. She was on a voyage from Blyth, Northumberland to Norrköping, Sweden. She was refloated and taken in to Kalmar.
Prince of Wales	United Kingdom	The paddle steamer was run into by the collier Sunderland off Portsea, Hampshire and was beached. Her passengers were landed. She was on a voyage from Portsmouth, Hampshire to Ryde, Isle of Wight.

== 25 May ==
List of shipwrecks: 25 May 1870
Ship	State	Description
Rapid	New Zealand	The 31-ton schooner was wrecked after it stranded at the mouth of the Manawatu River.

== 26 May ==
List of shipwrecks: 26 May 1870
Ship	State	Description
Carolina	Italy	The brig was destroyed by fire in the Atlantic Ocean with the loss of about 130 lives. Thirteen people were rescued. She was on a voyage from Genoa to Buenos Aires, Argentina.
Dodo	United Kingdom	The steamship was run into by the steamship Hopper (United Kingdom) off Penarth, Glamorgan and was severely damaged.
Gertrude	United Kingdom	The brig ran aground at Maryport, Cumberland and was severely damaged. She was refloated the next day.

== 27 May ==
List of shipwrecks: 27 May 1870
Ship	State	Description
Folly	New Zealand	The 17-ton ketch was lost after becoming stranded on a bar at the mouth of the Waimakariri River.
Johanne	United Kingdom	The ship was driven ashore and sank at Agger Tange, Denmark. Her crew were rescued. She was on a voyage from Middlesbrough, Yorkshire to Riga, Russia.
Scottish Chief	United Kingdom	The ship was wrecked on Valentia Island, County Cork. She was on a voyage from Limerick to Cork.

== 28 May ==
List of shipwrecks: 28 May 1870
Ship	State	Description
Emma	Russian Empire	The brig was wrecked on Hiiumaa. She was on a voyage from Vyborg, Grand Duchy of Finland to Hartlepool, County Durham, United Kingdom.
Hugh Miller	United Kingdom	The schooner was driven ashore at Smerby Castle, Argyllshire.
Osprey	United Kingdom	The ship ran aground near Kronstadt, Russia. She was on a voyage from London to Kronstadt.
Royal Berkshire	United Kingdom	The ship was run into by Bengal (United States) and sank in the Atlantic Ocean with the loss of eight of her fifteen crew. Survivors were rescued by Bengal. Royal Berkshire was on a voyage from Mauritius to a British port.
Victoria Hortense	France	The ship ran aground near Kronstadt. She was on a voyage from Rouen, Seine-Inférieure to Kronstadt.

== 29 May ==
List of shipwrecks: 29 May 1870
Ship	State	Description
Almira	United Kingdom	The ship ran aground on the Pluckington Bank, in Liverpool Bay.
Commerce	United Kingdom	The ship ran aground at Kertch, Russia. She was refloated the next day.
Emilie	Hamburg	The barque was wrecked at Prawle Head, Devon, United Kingdom. Her crew survived. She was on a voyage from Iquique, Chile to Altona.

== 30 May ==
List of shipwrecks: 30 May 1870
Ship	State	Description
Bertholly	United Kingdom	The schooner ran aground at Dungarvan, County Waterford. Her three crew were rescued by the Dungarvan Lifeboat Christopher Ludlow ( Royal National Lifeboat Institution).
Cornubia	Canada Canada	The ship was lost near Whitehead, Nova Scotia. She was on a voyage from Motril Spain to Sherbrooke, Nova Scotia.
Etoile Immacule des Mers	France	The ship was wrecked in the Faroe Islands with the loss of a crew member.

== Unknown date ==
List of shipwrecks: Unknown date in May 1870
Ship	State	Description
Albany	United Kingdom	The ship was wrecked on Long Island, New York, United States. She was on a voyage from Tobago to London.
Albion	United Kingdom	The ship was wrecked in the Islands of Fleet, Wigtownshire. She was on a voyage from Maryport, Cumberland to Belfast, County Antrim.
Alice Abbott	United States	The ship was driven ashore at Cape Henry, Virginia. She was on a voyage from Demerara, British Guiana to Baltimore, Maryland. She was refloated and taken in to Norfolk, Virginia in a leaky condition.
Amolihne	Norway	The ship was wrecked off Novaya Zemlya, Russia before 5 May. Her crew survived.
Anna Karma	Norway	The ship was wrecked north of Bodø with the loss of all hands. She was on a voyage from Hammerfest to Bergen.
Ann Catherine	United Kingdom	The ship sank at Shoreham-by-Sea, Sussex.
Atala	Italy	The barque was wrecked at Lebu, Chile. Her crew were rescued.
Aurora	United Kingdom	The ship was driven ashore at Moville, County Donegal.
Caroline	United Kingdom	The ship was wrecked in the White Sea. Her crew survived.
Cattarena	Italy	The ship was wrecked in the Balearic Islands, Spain. She was on a voyage from Reggio di Calabria to London.
Champion	United Kingdom	The barque foundered between 11 and 18 May. Her crew were rescued. She was on a voyage from the River Tyne to a Baltic port.
Christine	Flag unknown	The ship was driven ashore near Lemvig, Denmark. She was on a voyage from Messina, Sicily, Italy to Saint Petersburg, Russia.
Citadel	United Kingdom	The steamship ran aground at Grangemouth, Stirlingshire. She was refloated.
Clotilde	United States	The ship was damaged by fire at Boston, Massachusetts. She was on a voyage from Boston to Cienfuegos, Cuba.
Commerce	United Kingdom	The ship collided with another vessel and was beached near New York, United States.
Cordelia	United Kingdom	The ship was lost in St. Mary's River. She was on a voyage from Boston, Massachusetts to Miramichi, New Brunswick, Canada.
Cutter	United Kingdom	The ship was wrecked in Richmond Bay, Chile.
Dauntless	United Kingdom	The schooner was driven ashore and severely damaged on Ferret Island, County Kerry. She was on a voyage from Sligo to Cardiff, Glamorgan.
Delphin	United Kingdom	The ship ran aground in the Dardanelles. She was on a voyage from the River Tyne to Odesa, Russia. She was refloated and completed her voyage.
Dido	United Kingdom	The ship ran aground on the Newcombe Sand, in the North Sea off the coast of Suffolk.
Dongen	Flag unknown	The ship was driven ashore at Gilleleje, Denmark. She was on a voyage from Newcastle upon Tyne, Northumberland, United Kingdom to Kronstadt, Russia.
Dummail	United Kingdom	The clipper struck a rock at Hong Kong and sank before 19 May. She was on a voyage from London to Hong Kong.
Edward Curlin	United Kingdom	The barque foundered in the Atlantic Ocean off Cape Hatteras, North Carolina, United States in late May. Her crew were rescued by the steamship Mystic (United States). Edward Curlin was on a voyage from Barbados to New York.
Eleanor	United Kingdom	The ship was driven ashore at Kronstadt, Russia.
Elizabeth	United Kingdom	The ship ran aground on the Dowerness Reef.
Elphinstone	United States	The brig was wrecked at Nassau, Bahamas.
Emerald	United Kingdom	The schooner collided with Martha Cobb (United Kingdom) and was abandoned in a sinking condition. Her crew were rescued by Martha Cobb. Emerald was on a voyage from Briton Ferry, Glamorgan to Brixham, Devon.
Emily Augusta	United Kingdom	The full-rigged ship ran aground on the Owers Sand, in the English Channel off the coast of Sussex. She was on a voyage from Rotterdam, South Holland, Netherlands to Quebec City, Canada. She was refloated and taken into The Downs in a leaky condition.
Epervier	France	The ship was driven ashore at "Hennegaard", on the coast of Jutland. Her crew were rescued. She was on a voyage from Rouen, Seine-Inférieure to Königsberg, Prussia.
Fanny	(France) Martinique	The Brig was wrecked on the Farquhar Atoll.
Foyeland	Norway	The schooner ran aground at Grangemouth. She was refloated.
General Williams	Canada	The ship sank off Cape La Have, Nova Scotia on or about 26 May. Her crew were rescued. She was on a voyage from Halifax, Nova Scotia to Boston, Massachusetts, United States.
Gibraltar	United Kingdom	The tug sank at Dunbar, Lothian before 23 May.
Gogra	Flag unknown	The steamship was driven ashore "near Linga".
Gratitude	United Kingdom	The ship was driven ashore and wrecked near Donaghadee, County Down. She was on a voyage from Maryport to Londonderry.
Gulas Taverar	Denmark	The ship sank. Her crew were rescued. She was on a voyage from Assens to Antwerp, Belgium.
Helen Nicholson	United Kingdom	The ship was wrecked on "Prince's Island". Her crew were rescued. She was on a voyage from London to Shanghai, China.
Henry and Mary	United Kingdom	The ship was driven ashore at Brora, Sutherland. She was on a voyage from Wick, Caithness to Brora.
Hero	United Kingdom	The ship was destroyed by fire at sea before 5 May. She was on a voyage from Cienfuegos, Cuba to Montreal, Quebec, Canada.
Ilma	United Kingdom	The ship ran aground at Rangoon, Burma.
Iris	United Kingdom	The ship was driven ashore near Wismar. She was on a voyage from Burntisland, Fife to Lübeck.
Irne	Spain	The ship was driven ashore at Kronstadt.
Jessie Collin	United Kingdom	The ship was abandoned at sea. She was discovered by the steamship Moravian (United Kingdom), which put some of her cre aboard. Jessie Collin was towed in to Moville, County Donegal on 26 May.
Johanna	Netherlands	The ship was driven ashore and wrecked near Donaghadee. She was on a voyage from Liverpool to Narva, Russia.
Jonathan	United Kingdom	The ketch was wrecked near Newcastle upon Tyne, Northumberland.
Joseph Hume	United Kingdom	The ship foundered on or about 10 May with some loss of life.
Jupiter	United Kingdom	The ship ran aground near Visby, Sweden. She was on a voyage from Libava, Courland Governorate to London. She was refloated.
Lan Tong	China	The ship was driven ashore on Samar Island, Spanish East Indies. She was on a voyage from Manila, Spanish East Indies to Shanghai.
Larch	United Kingdom	The ship was beached at Harwich, Essex. She was on a voyage from Saint-Valery-sur-Somme, Somme, France to Runcorn, Cheshire.
Leviathan	United Kingdom	The ship was driven ashore in the Bahamas. She was on a voyage from Sagua La Grande, Cuba to Falmouth, Cornwall.
M. A. Forbes	Canada	The barque was wrecked in the Currituck Inlet on or before 6 May. She was on a voyage from Liverpool to Baltimore, Maryland, United States.
Maid of Athens	United Kingdom	The ship was driven ashore on Staten Island, New York, United States and was subsequently destroyed by fire. Her crew were rescued; eight of them by Foam (United Kingdom). Maid of Athens was on a voyage from London to Callao, Peru.
Margaret	United Kingdom	The ship was wrecked at "Stenort", Courland Governorate.
Maria	Sweden	The schooner was driven ashore. She was on a voyage from Oscarshamn to Stralsund. She was refloated and resumed her voyage.
Mary Jane	United Kingdom	The fishing vessel ran aground on the Daisley Sands, in The Wash and was wrecked. Both crew were rescued by a cutter from HMS Porcupine (Royal Navy). They were transferred to a foreign vessel, which towed Mary Jane in to King's Lynn, Norfolk in a waterlogged condition.
May	United Kingdom	The ship ran aground in the Dardanelles. She was on a voyage from a port in Ottoman Syria to Constantinople, Ottoman Empire. She was refloated.
Meg	Norway	The ship ran aground on the Krantsand. She was refloated.
Mentor	United Kingdom	The ship was driven ashore at Huelva, Spain.
Miroslavo	Papal States	The ship was wrecked off "Lombarda". She was on a voyage from Civita Vecchia to Venice, Italy.
Narva	United Kingdom	The ship was driven ashore and wrecked at Donaghadee.
Nione	France	The steamship was driven ashore on Bornholm, Denmark. She was on a voyage from Dunkirk, Nord to Saint Petersburg. She was refloated and resumed her voyage.
Nord	France	The steamship ran aground off Bornholm and was severely damaged. She was on a voyage from Bordeaux, Gironde to Kronstadt. She was refloated and completed her voyage.
Orient	United Kingdom	The brig sprang a leak and foundered off Môle-Saint-Nicolas, Haiti between 4 and 6 May. Her crew survived. She was on a voyage from Haiti to London.
Orion	United Kingdom	The ship foundered in the North Sea.
Parsee	United Kingdom	The ship was driven ashore in Chinnio Bay. She was on a voyage from Hong Kong to Swatow, China.
Patriotess	United Kingdom	The ship was driven ashore in the Danube near Galaţi, Ottoman Empire.
Pink	United Kingdom	The ship was driven ashore. She was on a voyage from Antwerp to Colchester, Essex. She was refloated and assisted in to Brightlingsea, Essex.
Rifleman	United Kingdom	The ship ran aground at Teignmouth, Devon. She was refloated.
Robert Cleugh	United Kingdom	The ship ran aground off Dymchurch, Kent. She was on a voyage from South Shields, County Durham to Marseille, Bouches-du-Rhône, France. She was refloated and taken in to Hythe, Kent.
Rusking	United Kingdom	The ship was wrecked off "Lews Island".
Rutlandshire	United Kingdom	The ship ran aground in the Hooghly River. She was on a voyage from Calcutta, India to Mauritius. She was refloated and resumed her voyage.
R. W. Griffiths	United States	The ship ran aground on the Brigas Shoals. She was on a voyage from Matanzas, Cuba to New York.
Sea King	United Kingdom	The tug caught fire and was scuttled at "Kivport". She was severely damaged.
Sir Hugh Rose	United Kingdom	The ship ran aground in the Rangafulla Channel. She was on a voyage from Moulmein, Burma to Calcutta. She was refloated and completed her voyage.
Societe	France	The ship struck the Parquettes. She was on a voyage from Audierne, Finistère to Dunkirk. She attempted to put in to Camaret-sur-Mer, Finistère but sank just outside the port.
Solferino	(Canada)	The schooner was driven ashore in Olive Cove. She was declared a total loss.
Spinner	United Kingdom	The brig was driven ashore at Domesnes, Courland Governorate. She was refloated with assistance.
Sunbeam	United States	The ship was destroyed by fire at Talcahuano, Chile. She was on a voyage from Iquique Chile to an American port.
Sydcap	Norway	The ship was wrecked off Novaya Zemlya before 5 May. Her crew survived.
Thomas Hamlin	United Kingdom	The ship departed from Liverpool for the Saint Lawrence River in mid-May. Presumed subsequently foundered, wreckage washed up on Islay in late May.
Thomas Wolcombe	United States	The ship was driven ashore at Santa Anna. She was on a voyage from New York to Frontera.
Unity	United Kingdom	The ship was driven ashore near Ardrossan, Ayrshire. She was refloated.
Valkyrien	United Kingdom	The ship ran aground on the Florida Reefs. She was on a voyage from the Black River to Falmouth. She was refloated and completed her voyage.
Varuna	United Kingdom	The ship ran aground on the Goodwin Sands, Kent. She was on a voyage from London to Port Phillip, Victoria.
Vine	United Kingdom	The steamship ran aground near Copenhagen, Denmark. She was refloated and resumed her voyage.
William Allan	(United Kingdom of Great Britain and Ireland) Jamaica	The ship was sunk by ice. She was on a voyage from Liverpool to Harbour Grace, Newfoundland Colony.
Witch of the Wave	United Kingdom	The ship was driven ashore on Castle Island, Bermuda.
Zeffiro	Italy	The brig sank off "Posiza Island".
