= Paligenosis =

Cell renewal process for injured tissue

Paligenosis (/pɑːliːdʒɛnoʊsɪs/) is a cellular program in which mature, quiescent, cells revert to a stem cell-like progenitor state in response to injury as a means to restore tissue damage. In 2018, paligenosis was first formally named and described as a three-stage series of defined molecular and cellular events that appear to be conserved across tissue types and throughout biology. As such, it is considered a fundamental cellular process akin to apoptosis, mitosis, and other cellular programs.

== History and etymology ==
Cellular plasticity and regeneration have long been observed in the animal kingdom, with examples such as regeneration of lizard's tail or salamander's limb found in scientific literature dating back to the 18th century. The concept of metaplasia was introduced in 1886 to describe a mode of cell plasticity in which cells of a lesion acquire an identity that is unusual within a given tissue while that tissue retains its normal features. In the 20th century, further investigation detailed examples of regeneration in various organs or species, including amphibian eggs. Much of this early work on regeneration was primarily focused on unidirectional, forward, mitotic processes. However, in 1900, pathologist John George Adami observed that differentiated cells are also able to revert to a pre-mitotic and regenerative state upon injury and speculated that this process is governed by a sequence of energetic and structural changes in the cell. A more detailed understanding of these changes and related mechanisms did not come until early in the 21st century with the advent of genetic tools and approaches. In 2006, researchers identified some of the first key molecular factors that induce differentiated cells to become reprogrammed as pluripotent stem cells. Other biomarkers similarly indicative of reversion to a stem cell-like state were reported in the following years. And in 2018, a three-stage series of metabolic changes that govern the cellular shift to a pre-mitotic state and subsequent re-entry into the cell cycle was characterized using the mouse stomach and pancreas as models, but also showing evidence of analogous processes in other organs and in humans. Pathologist Jason Mills and colleagues named this cellular program paligenosis, which was derived from the Greek pali/n/m (meaning backward or recurrence) + genea (born of, producing) + osis (an action or process).

== Description ==
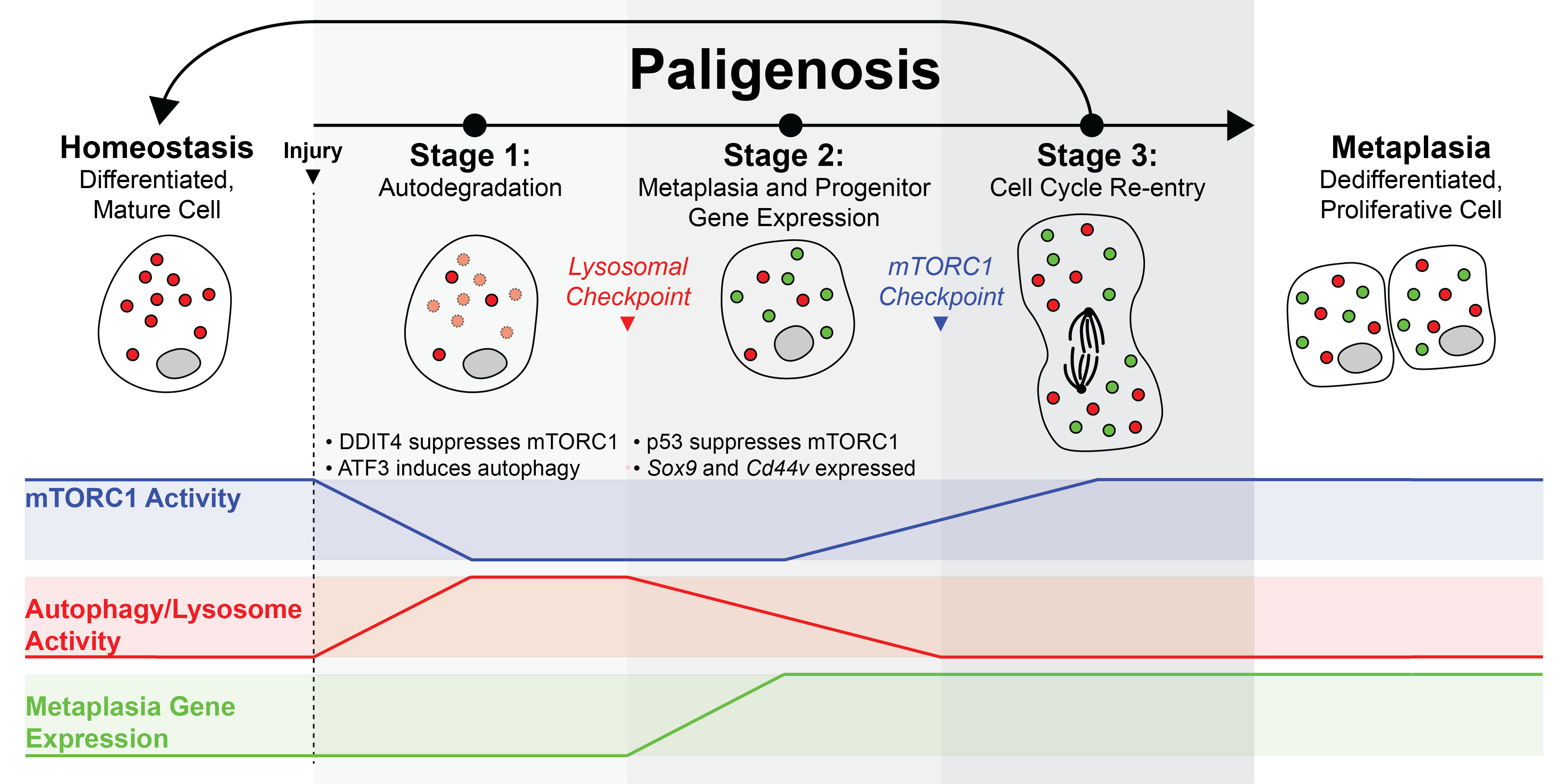
Illustration of the three stages of paligenosis.

Paligenosis is defined by three distinct stages of metabolic changes with intervening checkpoints. This stepwise process is governed by specific molecular factors, which are conserved across organs and species.

=== Stage 1: Autodegradation ===
The first stage of paligenosis is initiated by an injury-induced suppression of mTORC1, a regulatory protein complex that activates the translation of proteins. Meanwhile, autophagy and lysosome activity begins to increase, enabling cellular components to be degraded and repurposed. The suppression of mTORC1 is regulated by the DDIT4 protein in healthy cells, making it a gatekeeper and key factor for initiating and regulating this stage. The increase in autophagy activity is regulated by increased expression of ATF3 protein upon injury and consequential induction of the lysosomal trafficking RAB7B protein.

=== Stage 2: Metaplastic Gene Expression ===
As autodegradation activity reaches its peak, expression levels increase for a pair of metaplasia-associated genes, Sox9 and Cd44v. mTORC1 activity begins increasing as lysosome and autophagy activity declines. During this stage, mTORC1 is initially suppressed by the protein p53 (also known as TRP53), but healthy cells are able to accumulate IFRD1 protein that eventually facilitates p53 suppression, allowing mTORC1 levels to rise again. The modulation of mTORC1 and autophagy in the first two stages thus serves as checkpoints that allow only healthy cells to proliferate.

=== Stage 3: Cell Cycle Re-entry ===
In the final stage, mTORC1 activity continues to increase, while lysosome and autophagy activities return to baseline levels. This allows the cell to enter into a proliferative state as it returns to the cell cycle.

Paligenosis is linked to other cellular processes, and research has investigated its role in ribosome biogenesis, the Hippo pathway, and a reactive oxygen species pathway.

== Ubiquity in biology ==
Accumulating evidence suggests that the steps of paligenosis are evolutionarily conserved across species and different tissues, indicating that paligenosis is a fundamental biological process. Paligenosis has been studied most extensively in the mouse stomach, where it is often induced by Heliobacter pylori bacterial infection and marked by the loss of gastric parietal cells and reversion of chief cells to an embryonic-like progenitor state. This condition, referred to as atrophic gastritis, is a type of metaplasia known as pseudopyloric or pyloric metaplasia. At the base of pyloric metaplasia, lesions are composed of spasmolytic polypeptide-expressing metaplasia (SPEM) cells. SPEM cells replace the normal digestive enzyme-secreting chief cells and are accompanied by the expression of several genes and biomarkers that indicate transformation of chief cells to SPEM cells via paligenosis. Analogous structural changes accompanied by the presence of paligenosis biomarkers have similarly been identified and studied in other cell environments, including neurons, the liver, kidney, esophagus, and pancreas, often in the context of chronic injury conditions such as acid reflux in the case of Barrett's esophagus. Studies have also described these indicators of paligenosis not only in mice, but also humans, and other organisms including yeast, fruit flies, and axolotls.

== Role in cancer ==
Metaplastic cells are prone to adopting an abnormal state of growth known as dysplasia, eventually giving rise to tumors. Paligenosis provides an explanation for how this occurs through what has become known as the cyclical hit model of tumorigenesis. In this model, adult differentiated cells that have acquired mutations can be recruited back into a proliferative state via paligenosis. After healing, these cells can redifferentiate. However, under recurrent injury conditions that promote continued cycles of paligenosis, mutations and other chromosomal abnormalities can accumulate leading to loss of capacity for redifferentiation and conversion to uncontrolled cell growth and tumorigenesis. Because of this, the resistance of cancer cells to various modes of treatment can often be attributed to cellular plasticity. Continued investigation into paligenosis and related processes is thus motivated by the possibility of identifying treatable targets that can be useful for new cancer therapies.
