= Dunyvaig Castle =

Castle in Argyll and Bute, Scotland

Coordinates: 55°38′01″N 6°07′23″W

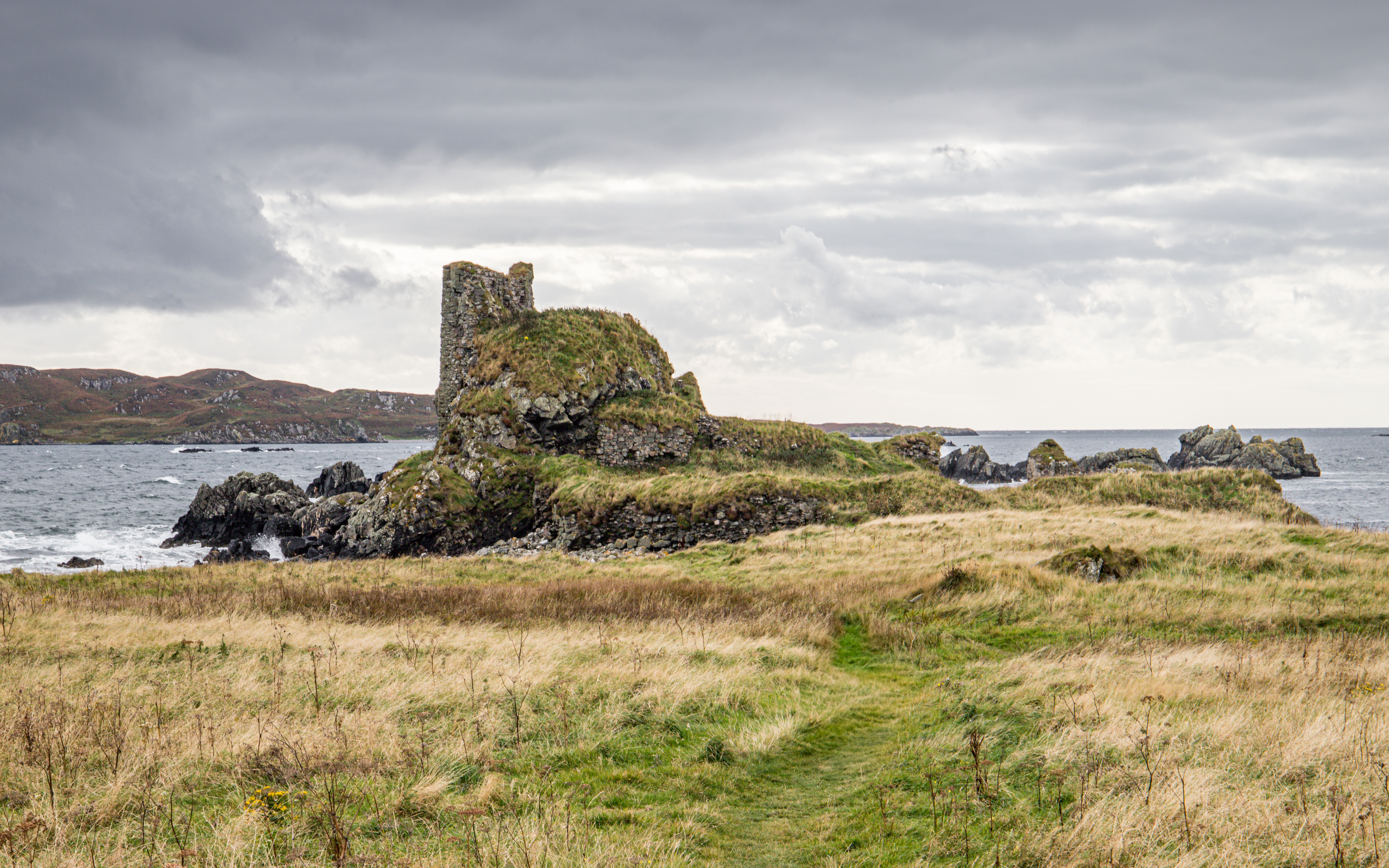
- The castle ruins in 2024
- Interactive map of Dunyvaig Castle

Dunyvaig Castle (Scottish Gaelic: Dùn Naomhaig, Anglicised Fort of the galleys, also known as Dunnyveg) is located on the south side of Islay, in Argyll, Scotland, on the shore of Lagavulin Bay, 4 kilometres (2 1/2 miles) from Port Ellen. The castle was once a naval base of the Lord of the Isles, chiefs of Clan Donald. It was held by the chiefs of the Clan MacDonald of Dunnyveg.

== History ==
=== 12th century ===
A castle was built by Somerled, King of the Isles, on top of a fort or dún on a rocky promontory jutting into Lagavulin Bay.

=== 13th and 14th centuries ===
The castle was held by the Macdonalds, Lords of the Isles, Somerled's descendants, specifically, Angus Mor Macdonald and his sons, Alexander Og and Angus Og. They used Lagavulin Bay as an anchorage for their fleet of galleys.

=== 15th and 16th centuries ===
Forfeited in 1493, the castle passed to the MacIans of Ardnamurchan. The MacIans were descended from John Macdonald, younger brother of Angus Og Macdonald, Lord of the Isles and friend of Robert the Bruce, and suffered when that clan was punished for the 1501-1506 insurrection of Black Donald; the castle was transferred to a branch of the Campbells. In 1545, however, the MacDonald holdings in Islay and Jura were restored to them.

Mary, Queen of Scots, planned a visit to Argyll in June 1563. Lady Agnes Campbell, the wife of James MacDonald of Dunyvaig, gave the queen a "marvellous fair" costume of "Hyeland apparell". In 1598, the castle was kept by John Stewart of Arskok who was given £3000 Scots yearly for the expenses.

=== 17th century ===
Angus MacDonald, 8th of Dunnyveg, surrendered the castle by negotiation to the King's lieutenant, the 3rd Lord Ochiltree, and The Rt. Rev. Andrew Knox, Bishop of the Isles, who brought a royal naval force with 1,000 men on 2 August 1608. On 5 August, Angus MacDonald and others came aboard the Advantage to celebrate Gowrie day, the anniversary of the rescue of James VI of Scotland at Perth in 1600. A garrison loyal to the King was installed.

In 1614, the castle was taken by Ranald Og Macdonald; however, it was retaken by Angus Og MacDonald, who attempted to bargain the castle's surrender. Bishop Knox attempted to retake the castle in September 1614 and was defeated and compelled to retreat. Knox left his son Thomas and his nephew John Knox of Ranfurly as hostages for his good faith.

Knox wrote to the lawyer Thomas Hamilton explaining these events and his actions after accusations that his inaction and sloth had led to the capture of the castle by the MacDonalds. He said his negotiation for the castle's surrender had stalled, and he had found it difficult to hire boats to take him from Arran to Dunyvaig during the harvest time. The MacLeans and McLeods of Harris refused to serve with him, and he could raise no more than seventy men, of whom fifty were waged soldiers and twenty followers of the lairds of Ardincaple and Ranfurly. When he landed on Islay, lacking any further armed support, the Clan Donald of Islay, outmanoeuvred him and cut him off from his boats, which they looted and destroyed. The next day, Knox was told he should surrender the two hostages or all his men would be executed. Knox noted that the MacDonalds had built a new fort in the loch. Some of his men had heard Angus Og MacDonald say he was working for the Earl of Argyll, who would give him the castle and the whole lands of Islay. Thomas Hamilton wrote to Knox, who was at Brodick Castle offering the services of the Earl of Caithness and his cannon, but noting it was too late in the year.

George Graham negotiated the freedom of the two hostages or "gentlemen prisoners" although he lacked official support except a verbal promise from the Chancellor, the 1st Earl of Dunfermline, of a cash reward. On 6 January 1615, Sir John Campbell of Calder, with the assistance of Sir Oliver Lambart who brought artillery and men in the Phoenix and retook the castle. Lambert captured 22 men while 22 others including Coll Ciotach escaped from a postern gate into a longboat.

In June 1615, Sir James MacDonald and Coll Ciotach captured the castle again, killing the captain and some of the garrison. The Privy Council of Scotland asked for a pinnace with cannon to batter the castle. Sir James MacDonald fled, and on 13 October 1615 before the guns were landed from the Charles and a barque Coll Ciotach surrendered to Argyll.

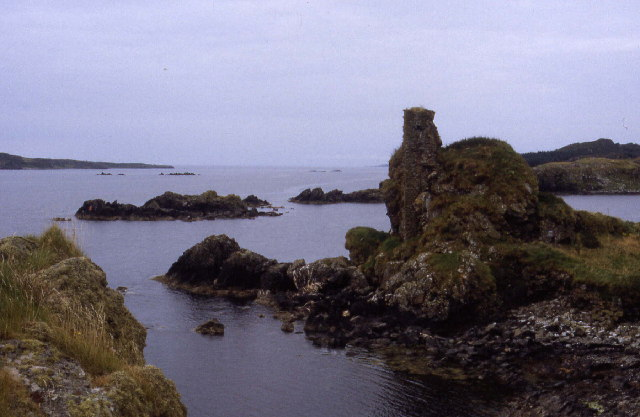
The castle ruins in 2002

The castle was seized in 1647 by the Covenanters and passed into the hands of the Campbells of Cawdor, who held it until 1677, when Sir Hugh Campbell pulled down the castle and moved to Islay House.

== Ruins ==
Today all that remains of the castle are mainly the ruins of the sixteenth-century castle, although the site includes a thirteenth-century courtyard, and a fifteenth-century keep. The site was designated as a scheduled monument in 1989.
