= Alexander Og MacDonald (disambiguation) =

Alexander Og MacDonald may refer to:

- Alexander Og MacDonald, 17th century chief of the MacDonalds of Dunnyveg
- Alasdair Óg of Islay, mediaeval chief of the MacDonalds

== See also ==
- Alexander MacDonald (disambiguation)
