= Alexander McDonald =

Alexander McDonald may refer to:

- Alexander McDonald (Royal Marines officer) (c. 1745–1821), early land owner in New South Wales
- Alexander McDonald (sculptor) (1784–1860), Scottish granite sculptor
- Alexander N. McDonald (1818–1885), businessman and political figure in Nova Scotia, Canada
- Alexander McDonald (surgeon) (1819 – c. 1848), Scottish physician on Franklin's lost expedition
- Alexander McDonald (American politician) (1832–1903), U.S. Senator from Arkansas
- A. B. McDonald (Alexander Beith McDonald, 1847–1915), Scottish architect
- Alexander McDonald (South Australian politician) (1849–1922), member of the South Australian House of Assembly
- Alexander McDonald (1845–1920), member of the Victorian Legislative Assembly
- Alec McDonald (politician), member of the Victorian Legislative Assembly
- Alexander McDonald (Canadian politician) (1876–1945), Canadian politician in the Legislative Assembly of British Columbia
- Alexander Hugh McDonald (1908–1979), New Zealand classicist and ancient historian
- Alexander Hamilton McDonald (1919–1980), Canadian politician
- Sandy McDonald (Alexander McDonald, 1937–2016), Church of Scotland minister

== See also ==
- Alexander MacDonald (disambiguation)
- Alex McDonald (disambiguation)
- Sandy McDonald (disambiguation)
