= English ship Phoenix (1613) =

History

English Navy Royal
- Name: Phoenix
- Ordered: June 1612
- Builder: Chatham Dockyard
- Launched: 1613
- Fate: Not listed after 1624

General characteristics
- Class & type: Pinnace
- Tons burthen: 184.8/246.4 tons bm
- Length: 70 ft 0 in (21.3 m) keel
- Beam: 24 ft 0 in (7.3 m)
- Depth of hold: 11 ft 0 in (3.4 m)
- Propulsion: Sail
- Sail plan: ship-rigged
- Complement: 100 (1624)
- Armament: in 1624; 12 × sakers; 4 × minions; 2 × falcons

Phoenix was described as a pinnace in the service of the English Navy Royal.

Phoenix was the second named vessel since it was used for a 20-gun ship purchased in 1545, rebuilt in 1558 and sold in 1573.

== Construction and specifications ==
She was built at Chatham Dockyard. She was ordered on June 1612 and launched on 27 February 1613. Her dimensions were 70 feet 0 inches (21.3 metres) for keel with a breadth of 24 feet 0 inches (7.3 metres) and a depth of hold of 11 feet 0 inches (3.4 metres). Her tonnage was between 184.8 and 246.4 tons.

Her gun armament was in 1624 18 guns consisting of twelve sakers, (Note: A sacar or saker was a gun of 1,400 pounds with a 3.5-inch bore firing a 5.5-pound shot with a 5.5-pound powder charge.) four minions, (Note: A minion was a gun of 1,000 pounds with a 3.5-inch bore firing a 4-pound shot with a 4-pound powder charge.) two falcons, (Note: A falcon was a gun of 660 pounds with a 2.5-inch bore firing a 2-pound shot with a 3.5-pound powder charge.) plus four fowlers. (Note: A fowler was an anti-personnel breech-loading gun that fired either stone or grape shot. the weapon weighed about 5 cwt and the breech weighed another 1 cwt.) Her manning was around 100 officers and men in 1603.

== Commissioned service ==
She was appointed to escort Princess Elizabeth, daughter of James VI and I, and Frederick V of the Palatinate sailing in The Prince Royal from Margate to Ostend in April 1613.

The Phoenix known for its action on the coast of Ireland and west coast of Scotland in 1614 and 1615, commanded by Captain Button. Sir Oliver Lambert, commander of Irish forces for James I sailed in the Phoenix with the Moon to Aulderfleit in Knockfergus to embark 150 soldiers and cannon. They sailed to Islay in preparation to besiege Dunyvaig Castle where Captain Button stayed behind during storms until 18 January 1614, uncertain if there was "safe riding" at the Isle of Texa. The Moon came under heavy fire from the castle while attempting to unload the artillery. Button continued to use the Phoenix as Admiral of the Irish coast in 1620.

== Disposition ==
Phoenix was not mentioned after 1624.
