= Smerby Castle =

Smerby Castle (Island Muller Castle)
- Kintyre, Scotland
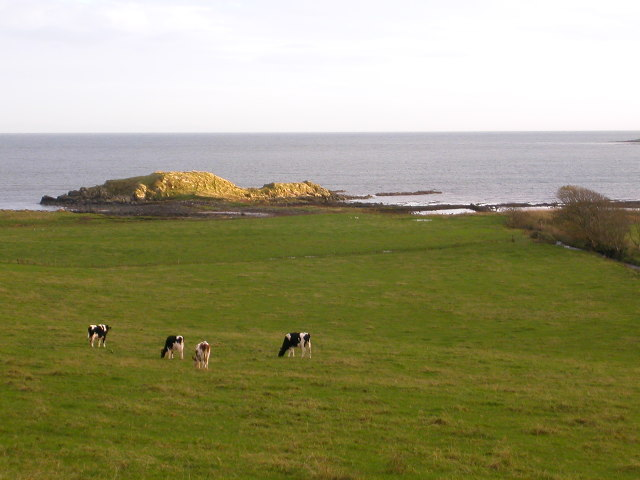
- Island Muller, Kintyre, Scotland

Site information
- Type: Fortified house
- Condition: Ruin

Location
- Location within Argyll and Bute
- Coordinates: 55.4366°N 5.5388°W

Smerby Castle, also known as Island Muller Castle, is a ruined fortified house on a promontory known as Isla Muller, Kintyre, Argyll and Bute, Scotland, north of Campbeltown. The site is protected as a scheduled monument.

== History ==
=== 16th century ===
Ranald MacDonald was granted Smerby Castle from his father James MacDonald, 6th of Dunnyveg.

Angus MacDonald, 8th of Dunnyveg was kept as a prisoner in chains at Smerby Castle in 1598 after James MacDonald was sent to seek his fathers submission to King James V of Scotland. Angus suffered burns after his Kintyre house Askomull was burnt down by his son James and was subsequently captured. The MacDonalds of Smerby were known as "MacConnell" due to the Gaelic pronunciation of Macdonald as such. In a 1594 Bond by James "Macdonald" of Smerby, signed as M'Connall and a 1597 Bond by Sir James "MacDonald" of Knockrinsay also signed as M'Connall
