= John George Adami =

English pathologist

Professor John George Adami CBE FRS FRCP FRCS FRSE
- Born: 12 January 1862; Manchester, England
- Died: 29 August 1926 (aged 64); Liverpool, England
- Education: Owens College; Christ's College; University of Cambridge
- Spouses: Mary Stuart Cantlie (m. 1894; died 1916) Marie Wilkinson (m. 1922)
- Children: 2
- Medical career
- Profession: Physician
- Field: Pathologist
- Institutions: University of Cambridge; McGill University; University of Liverpool
- Notable works: Principles of Pathology (1908)
- Awards: Fothergill Gold Medal (1914); Croonian Lecture (1917)
- Military career
- Allegiance: Canada
- Branch: Royal Canadian Army Medical Corps
- Service years: 1914–1918
- Rank: Colonel
- Conflicts: World War I

John George Adami (/əˈdæmi/; 12 January 1862 – 29 August 1926) was an English pathologist. He was the head of the pathological department of the Royal Victoria Hospital. From 1892, he was professor of pathology in McGill University, Montreal, Canada. During World War I, he was accorded a temporary commission in the Canadian Army Medical Corps to serve as the official historian for the medical branch. Starting in 1919, he was the Vice-Chancellor of the University of Liverpool.

== Life ==
He was born in the Ashton upon Mersey district of south Manchester, England, the son of John George Adami, a local hotel proprietor, and his wife, Sarah Ann Ellis Leech.

He was educated at Manchester Grammar School, Owens College in Manchester and then studied medicine at Christ's College, Cambridge, with postgraduate study in both Breslau (then in Germany, now part of Poland) and Paris. He took distinguished honours at Cambridge in natural science, was Darwin prizeman in 1885, M.R.C.S., and was appointed demonstrator of physiology at Cambridge University in 1887.

In 1888, he exposed himself to rabies, and published an account of his treatment at the Pasteur Institute's vaccination clinic. Elected fellow of Jesus College, Cambridge in 1891, he soon afterwards became head of the pathological department of the Royal Victoria Hospital. From 1892, he was Professor of Pathology in McGill University, Canada.

During World War I he held a temporary commission in the Canadian Army Medical Corps and served on the staff of the overseas Director General Medical Services, London. His principal role was as Assistant Medical Director in charge of statistics and returns. He was also appointed Medical Historical Recorder, and in this capacity charged with compiling a contemporary account of the Canadian medical service during the war, the first volume of which was published in 1918 as The War Story of the Canadian Army Medical Corps, Vol. 1. The remainder of his work on this subject remains unpublished. His wartime diary is held at the Welcome Library. From 1919, he was Vice-Chancellor of University of Liverpool.

He was the author of numerous monographs upon subjects relating to pathology in French, German, English and American medical journals, and of many papers read before medical societies. He was elected a Fellow of the Royal Society of Edinburgh in 1898, His proposers were John Batty Tuke, Diarmid Noel Paton, Thomas Richard Fraser and David Berry Hart. He was elected a Fellow of the Royal Society of Canada in 1902 and a Fellow of the Royal Society on 11 May 1905.

He died in Liverpool in 1926.

== Family ==
He married Mary Stuart Cantlie in 1894 in Montreal. They had three children, of whom 2 survived. Widowed in 1916, he married in 1922 in Liverpool Marie Wilkinson, who outlived him.

== Legacy ==
In 1903 Adami proposed two new terms that would be used to classify the neoplasms: lepidic (from λεπις, λεπιδος, meaning a rind, skin, or membrane), applied to characterise the tumors that appeared to be derived from connective tissues, and hylic (from ύΛη, meaning crude undifferentiated material) for tumors that appeared to be derived from connective tissues. In the present day the term lepidic defines the proliferation of tumor cells along the surface of intact alveolar walls without stromal or vascular invasion.

== Works ==
- Adami, John George; Nicholls, Albert George (1908). Principles of Pathology. Lea & Febiger.
- Adami, J. George (1909). Inflammation. : An introduction to the study of pathology. Being the reprint (revised and enlarged) of an article in Professor Allbutt's 'System of medicine' (4th ed.). London: Macmillan & Co., Limited.
- Adami, J. George (1918). War Story of the Canadian Army Medical Corps by J. George (John George) Adami (first and only published volume). London: Colour Ltd.; The Rolls House Publishing Co.

== Honours and awards ==
- 1898: Fellow of the Royal Society of Edinburgh
- 1905: Fellow of the Royal Society of London
- 1914: Fothergillian prize of the London Medical Society
- 1917: Croonian Lecture at the Royal College of Physicians
- 1919: awarded CBE
- 1921: 1st David Lloyd Roberts Lecture at Manchester Royal Infirmary: "Charles White of Manchester (1728-1813) and the arrest of puerperal fever"
