= David Lloyd Roberts =

British gynaecologist and bibliophile (1835–1920)

David Lloyd Roberts FRSE FRCP
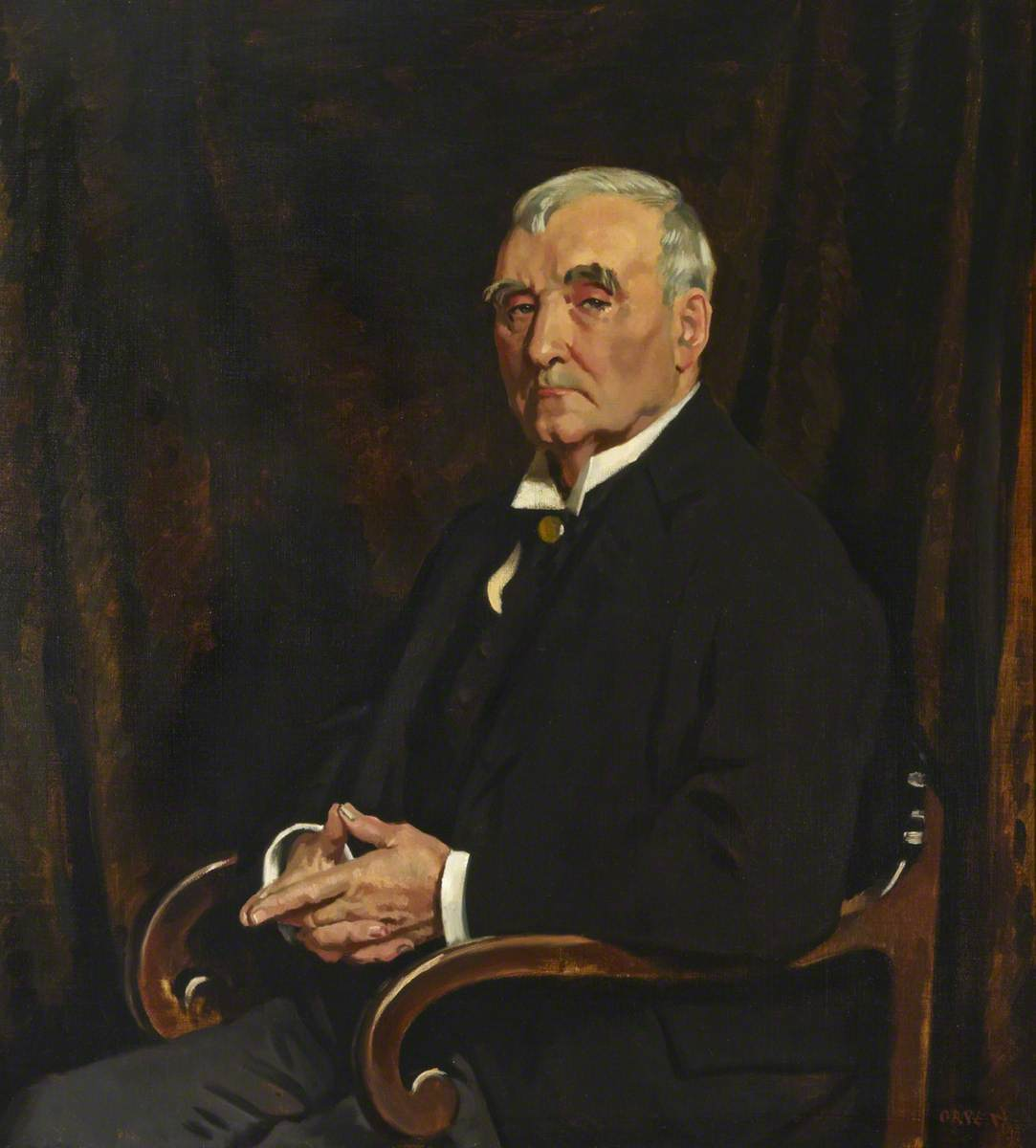

Personal details
- Born: 1835 Stockport, Cheshire, England
- Died: 1920 (aged 84–85)
- Occupation: Gynaecologist

David Lloyd Roberts (1835–1920) was a British gynaecologist and bibliophile.

== Life ==
He was born in Stockport, the son of Robert Roberts, a cotton spinner. He was first apprenticed as a chemist before more formal education at Ripponden College. He then assisted Professor William Smith in his physiology classes at Owen's College in Manchester, being allowed to study Medicine in his spare hours before winning a place at St Andrews University. He did further postgraduate studies in Paris and London. He qualified MB in 1857and MD in 1859.

In 1858, he began work as Surgeon in Ordinary at St Marys Hospital for Women and Children in Manchester.

In 1880, he was elected a Fellow of the Royal Society of Edinburgh. His proposers were James Matthews Duncan, Sir Alexander Russell Simpson, Sir Thomas Grainger Stewart, and Angus Macdonald.

In 1885, he was appointed Gynaecological Surgeon to Manchester Royal Infirmary.

He retired from surgery in 1895 and died on 29 September 1920. He bequeathed a library of over 3000 largely medical books and 53 rare incunabula to the Royal College of Physicians in London and endowed them to provide the Lloyd Roberts Lectures which ran annually from 1921 to 1953. His literary collection of over 2000 books was bequeathed to the John Rylands Library.

== Family ==
He was married to Martha Occleshaw daughter of W. H. Occleshaw. They had no children.

== Artistic recognition ==
His portrait was painted by William Orpen.

== Publications ==
- The Practice of Midwifery (1857)
- A Student's Guide to Practical Midwifery (1876)
- Sir Thomas Browne's Religio Medici (1892)
- The Scientific Knowledge of Dante (1914)
