= Donald Gorm MacDonald of Carey =

Donald Gorm MacDonald of Carey was a son of James MacDonald, 6th of Dunnyveg, and Lady Agnes Campbell, daughter of the 3rd Earl of Argyll. Donald obtained the barony of Carey in North Antrim by patent on 18 September 1584. He was killed during the battle of Ardnaree, Ireland in 1586 against the English.

Donald had issue:

- Donald Gorm Og
