= Agnes Campbell =

Lady of Dunnyveg

Lady Agnes Campbell
- Queen consort of Tír Eoghain
- Born: 1526; Inveraray Castle, Argyll, Scotland
- Died: c. 1590 - 1601
- Spouses: James MacDonald (m. 1545; died 1565); Sir Turlough Luineach O'Neill (m. 1569)
- Father: The 3rd Earl of Argyll

Lady Agnes Campbell (1526 – c. 1590) was a Scottish noblewoman and queen consort of Tír Eoghain. She was the mother of Iníon Dubh and the maternal grandmother of Red Hugh O'Donnell.

Campbell was a skilled diplomat and political leader. Her influence over the reign of her second husband, Sir Turlough Luineach O'Neill, Lord of Tír Eoghain, is noted by both contemporary and modern sources. Many, including Lord Deputy Sir Henry Sidney, viewed her as Tír Eoghain's primary leader.

== Family background ==
Agnes Campbell was born in 1526, probably at Inveraray Castle. She was the second daughter of Colin Campbell, 3rd Earl of Argyll, and his wife, Jean Gordon, daughter of The 3rd Earl of Huntly. Her sister, Elizabeth, married The 1st Earl of Moray, an illegitimate son of King James IV of Scotland. According to Connolly, she was a half-brother of the Earl of Argyll. She was raised at the Scottish royal court.

== MacDonald clan ==
Campbell married James MacDonald, the 6th Chief of Clan MacDonald of Dunnyveg and the Glens of Antrim, in 1545, forming an alliance with the MacDonalds. This was the same year he was elected Lord of the Isles, making MacDonald and Campbell significant figures in Scotland. Allegedly, she had already been married once before.

Women in early modern Scotland did not use their husband's surnames after marriage. They had six sons and one daughter - Finola O'Donnell, more famously known as Iníon Dubh, who married Sir Hugh McManus O'Donnell, a prominent Ulster chieftain, around 1569.

In June 1563, Campbell gave Mary, Queen of Scots, a "marvellous fair" Highland costume to wear on a progress to Argyll.

James MacDonald died on 5 July 1565 while being held prisoner by the Irish chieftain Shane O'Neill. At that time Shane had been supporting the English.

Now a widow, Campbell commanded the loyalty of a substantial number of Scots mercenaries, who were drawn to Ireland due to changes in Scotland. She wielded significant influence in Ulster, which she used to advance her children's interests.

== In Ireland ==
=== Marriage to Turlough O'Neill ===
Once Turlough Lynagh O'Neill succeeded Shane as Lord of Tír Eoghain, he offered an alliance to the MacDonalds. In November 1567, he asked for either Finola or Agnes' hand in marriage. Turlough hoped to use his connections to the MacDonalds' to recruit Redshank mercenaries to his own armies. By April 1568, the MacDonalds had decided that Agnes would marry Turlough, and in 1569, she moved to Ireland. They married in July 1569 on Rathlin Island.

She took with her a dowry of 1,200 Highland troops, and Gaelic tradition allowed her to lead the troops. She personally led them against occupying English forces and proved herself a formidable leader. She also helped mobilise Scottish support for the Irish, and played a major role in the Second Desmond Rebellion.

A major factor in Turlough marrying Campbell was to recruit her family's Redshanks to attack the Pale. However, she did not always comply with Turlough's wishes. Her loyalty to the MacDonald and Campbell families strained her marriage to Turlough, and rumours of a divorce spread shortly after their honeymoon. According to historian Judy Barry, it seems Turlough "settled into a subordinate role, accepting both Agnes's judgement and her superior diplomatic skills". At her request, Turlough agreed to an accord with the English government in 1571, and in June 1575, she negotiated peace terms with the 1st Earl of Essex. Campbell maintained peaceful relations with both the MacDonalds and the English authorities. She was seen as a calming influence on Turlough; she encouraged him to conform to state policy. Agnes also established a small settlement around Turlough main castle at Strabane.

=== Rivalry with Sorley Boy ===
Campbell feared that Turlough's rival Sorley Boy MacDonnell, also James MacDonald's brother, was a threat to her sons' political success. She aimed to establish her sons Angus and Donald Gorm MacDonald as rivals to Sorley Boy by claiming land for them in the Glens of Antrim. She prohibited Turlough from conferring with Lord Deputy Sidney until he would assist them. It was not until January 1577 that Sidney parleyed with Turlough and Campbell at Newry.

Campbell was finally successful when in May 1586, her and Angus were granted "Bissett's lands" - estates in the Glens of Antrim long claimed by Sorley Boy.

=== At the Scottish court ===
In February 1580, the English ambassador in Scotland, Robert Bowes, heard that Agnes Campbell intended to return to Scotland, and visit her nephew, the Earl of Argyll, at Glasgow to discuss her lands in Scotland and further the interests of her husband. She came to Scotland in May 1580 with her son Angus O'Neill.

In 1583, Campbell was suspected of intriguing with the Scottish court. She claimed her sole reason for visiting Scotland was to securing land for her eldest son Angus. That November, on behalf of herself and Sir Turlough, she swore fealty to Elizabeth I on behalf of herself and Sir Turlough.

In 1588, Angus disputed with the 7th Earl of Argyll. Once again, Lady Agnes Campbell tried to turn the Scottish court in his favour. The same year, she also entered discussions with Lord Deputy Sir John Perrot about restoring lands leased by her husband to Hugh O'Neill, Earl of Tyrone.

== Death ==
Sources conflict on Campbell's date of death - c. 1590, c. 1595 or 1601. James Balfour Paul stated that Agnes Campbell was imprisoned by Shane O'Neill and died in captivity, though this is unlikely as Shane died in 1567. It is known that Turlough sought Mabel Bagenal's hand in marriage at some point before August 1591.

== Character ==
Campbell was fluent in English and Latin, which greatly impressed the English. She was praised by Sir Henry Sidney, as "a grave, wise, well-spoken lady in Scottish, English, and French". Sir Geoffrey Fenton described her as a skilled negotiator; "eager and sharp".

== Children ==
Her children with James MacDonald include:

- Archibald MacDonald, 7th of Dunnyveg, died without issue in 1569.
- Angus MacDonald, 8th of Dunnyveg, died circa 1613.
- Ranald MacDonald of Smerby, married a daughter of Bannatyne of Kames, died 1616.
- Coll MacDonald, died at Eilean Mor Cormac.
- Donald Gorm MacDonald of Carey, killed during the Battle of Ardnaree, County Mayo, in 1586.
- Alexander Carragh MacDonald of Glenarm, also killed during the Battle of Ardnaree in 1586.
- Finola MacDonald (Iníon Dubh), married Sir Hugh McManus O'Donnell as his second wife
- Catherine MacDonald, married Shane O'Neill.

Her children with Sir Turlough Lynagh O'Neill include:

- Art O'Neill, married a daughter of Cuconnacht Maguire
