= Alex McDonald =

Alex McDonald may refer to:

- Alex McDonald (prospector) (1859–1909), prospector who made and lost a fortune in the Klondike Gold Rush
- Alex McDonald (Wisconsin politician) (1866–1936), American politician
- Alex McDonald (footballer, born 1878) (1878–1949), Scottish footballer for various English clubs
- Alex McDonald (rugby union) (1883–1967), New Zealand rugby union player, coach and administrator
- Alex McDonald (athlete) (born 1945), Jamaican middle-distance runner and sprinter
- Alex McDonald (Australian rules footballer) (born 1970), Australian rules footballer for Collingwood and Hawthorn
- Alex McDonald Shipyard on Staten Island

== See also ==
- Alex MacDonald (footballer born 1948), Scottish footballer who played for St. Johnstone, Rangers and Hearts
- Alex MacDonald (footballer born 1990), Scottish footballer currently playing for Falkirk, on loan from Burnley
- Alexander McDonald (disambiguation)
- Alexander MacDonald (disambiguation)
