= Andrew Knox (bishop) =

Scottish churchman (1559–1633)

Andrew Knox (1559 – 27 March 1633) was a Scottish churchman who was Bishop of the Isles in Scotland from 1605–1619 and Bishop of Raphoe in Ireland from 1610–1633.

== Early life ==
He was the second son of John Knox of Ranfurly in Renfrewshire. He was educated at the University of Glasgow, where he graduated M.A. in 1579. In 1581 he was ordained minister of Lochwinnoch in Renfrewshire, and in 1581 was translated to the abbey church of Paisley. On 6 March 1590 he was appointed on a commission of select clergymen to promote subscription to the confession of faith and covenant over the whole kingdom. In the 1590s, Knox intermittently received a pension from England as potential supporter of English policy in Scotland.

In December 1592 he was instrumental in arresting George Kerr on the Isle of Cumray as he was on the point of sailing for Spain, and was thereby the means of bringing to light and frustrating the conspiracy of the Earls of Huntly, Errol, and Angus. In 1597 he was appointed a commissioner with others to seek out and apprehend Catholics and others in touch with the King of Spain. He accidentally caused the death by drowning of Hew Barclay of Ladyland, who had intended to capture and fortify Ailsa Craig; he was exonerated and commended by parliament. Elizabeth I sent him a reward of £100, entrusted to Anne of Denmark's goldsmith Elias Le Tellier.

== Bishop of the Isles ==
Knox was involved in disputes with his fellow-citizens, and during the course of one of them struck an adversary, George Stewart, burgess of Paisley, in public court. He was ordered to do public penance in his church. In 1606 Knox was created Bishop of the Isles, and having obtained leave from the presbytery he immediately proceeded to his diocese. On 31 July he was commissioned along with others to meet with David, Lord Scone and hear the offers made by the inhabitants of the Isles and the Highlands on the royal rents. In January 1607 he was appointed constant moderator of the presbytery of the Isles, and on 4 June he took the oath of allegiance. His absence from his charge at Paisley meant that on 12 November 1607 he was relieved of his charge.

In accordance with King James's intention to reform the Western Isles and Highlands, Bishop Knox was on 8 March 1608 joined in commission with Andrew Stuart, 3rd Lord Ochiltree, to take the matter in hand. In May he visited the King at Greenwich, and brought back instructions for a military expedition against the Isles, of which Lord Ochiltree was to be commander, assisted by a council, of which Knox was to be the head with a salary and bodyguard of his own. The expedition sailed early in August, and the castles of Dunivaig and Lochgorme in Islay having been surrendered by Angus Macdonald, Ochiltree opened a court at the castle of Aros in Mull on 15 August. The chieftains were reluctant to come to terms; Ochiltree, acting on the advice of Knox, had them visit him on board his vessel on pretence of a dinner and a sermon from the bishop. Having succeeded in kidnapping them, Ochiltree sailed to Glasgow. On his return Knox accompanied Ochiltree to London, and was commended by the King for his zeal.

Knox was in February 1609 appointed one of a commission to negotiate with the chieftains for the purpose of devising a scheme for the religious settlement of the Western Islands. In May he was the bearer of a confidential message from his colleagues to the king. He returned in June with instructions for a fresh expedition, of which he himself was to be the head, and he conducted the business with great credit to himself. Before the end of July he met the principal chieftains at Iona, and with their consent enacted the "Statutes of Icolmkill". He returned to Edinburgh in September, but immediately proceeded to London. He seems to have been detained at court till the following July, when he returned to Edinburgh, and made formal re-delivery of the Band and Statutes of Icolmkill before the council. On 15 February 1610 he was appointed a member of the court of ecclesiastical high commission for the province of Glasgow, and on 8 May steward of the whole Western Isles, with instructions to make the castle of Dunivaig his headquarters.

== Bishop of Raphoe ==
He was nominated to the Church of Ireland bishopric of Raphoe in County Donegal on 7 May 1610 and appointed by letters patent on 26 June 1611; he continued to hold both bishoprics till 22 September 1619, when he resigned that of the Isles in favour of his eldest son, Thomas Knox. Having established a garrison in the castle of Dunivaig, he went to Ireland, and in April 1611 transmitted to Lord Salisbury a report of the state of religion in his diocese. In consequence of his report the King instructed Sir Arthur Chichester to require the Archbishop of Armagh to convene a meeting of the bishops of his province in order to consider the reformation of ecclesiastical abuses in the north of Ireland. In October Chichester reported favourably on Bishop Knox to the King. On 13 February 1612 the King authorised Dr. Knox's admission to the Scottish Privy Council; he was granted arrears and expenses, and the Isle of Barra for life.

In 1614 the castle of Dunivaig was surprised by the Macdonalds, and Knox, attempting to retake it with insufficient force, was defeated and compelled to treat. He consented to solicit a lease of the Crown lands of Isla for Angus Oig Macdonald, together with the proprietary rights in the castle of Dunivaig, and a free pardon for all crimes up to date, and to leave his son Thomas and his nephew John Knox of Ranfurly as hostages for his good faith. The council, however, refused these terms, and prepared to reduce the Macdonalds by force.

Bishop Knox then advised deceit in dealing with the Macdonalds, with a view to the plantation of their lands by men from the north of Ireland and the west of Scotland. His approach was taken up in part by the Earl of Argyll on behalf of his kinsman, John Campbell of Calder, who had undertaken their reduction on condition of succeeding to their inheritance. A John Graham managed that Thomas and John Knox were freed, and on 6 January 1616 Campbell of Calder, with the assistance of Sir Oliver Lambart, captured Dunivaig.

Knox resigned the bishopric of the Isles in 1618, but continued as Protestant Lord Bishop of Raphoe till his death on 27 March 1633. Two bells he had taken from the abbey of Icolmkill to Raphoe were by royal edict sent back by his successor, Bishop John Lesley.

== Family ==
He married a cousin Elizabeth Knox, and by her he had three sons, Thomas, James, and George, and two daughters, Margaret, who married John Cunningham of Cambuskeith, son of James Cunningham, 7th Earl of Glencairn, and another, who married John Hamilton of Woodhall. The three sons took orders in the church.
