= English ship Charles (1615) =

History

England
- Name: Charles
- In service: 1615

The Charles was a royal ship of England in the 1600s.

== History ==
The ship was used to carry guns to the siege of Dunyvaig Castle in October 1615. The Charles, captained by David Murray, was employed in 1617 to carry the baggage of James VI and I to Scotland. The Charles was again sent to Scotland on royal service in 1619. To save money in idle times, some of the artillery was to be kept on-board and some stored in Edinburgh Castle, while the ship was to be left at anchor at St Margaret's Hope at Rosyth on the River Forth.

Captain David Murray was sent with the ship to Orkney and Shetland, and to collect the assize duty of the Holland fishing fleet. It was found to be in need of extensive repairs and brought to the harbour of Leith for a refit in 1621. The work was finished in May 1622 and the Charles was sent back to England to rejoin the navy. Gunpowder was supplied to the Charles from Edinburgh Castle by James Murray.
