= Peter Benson (architect) =

- Born: c. 1570; London, England
- Died: August 24, 1642 (aged 71–72); Derry, Ireland
- Occupations: Architect, builder, bricklayer
- Years active: 1597–1642
- Children: 10
- Practice: Independent builder
- Buildings: Walls of Derry
- Projects: Layout of the town of Stranorlar

Peter Benson (c.1570–1642) was an English-born builder and architect, chiefly remembered for building the Walls of Derry.

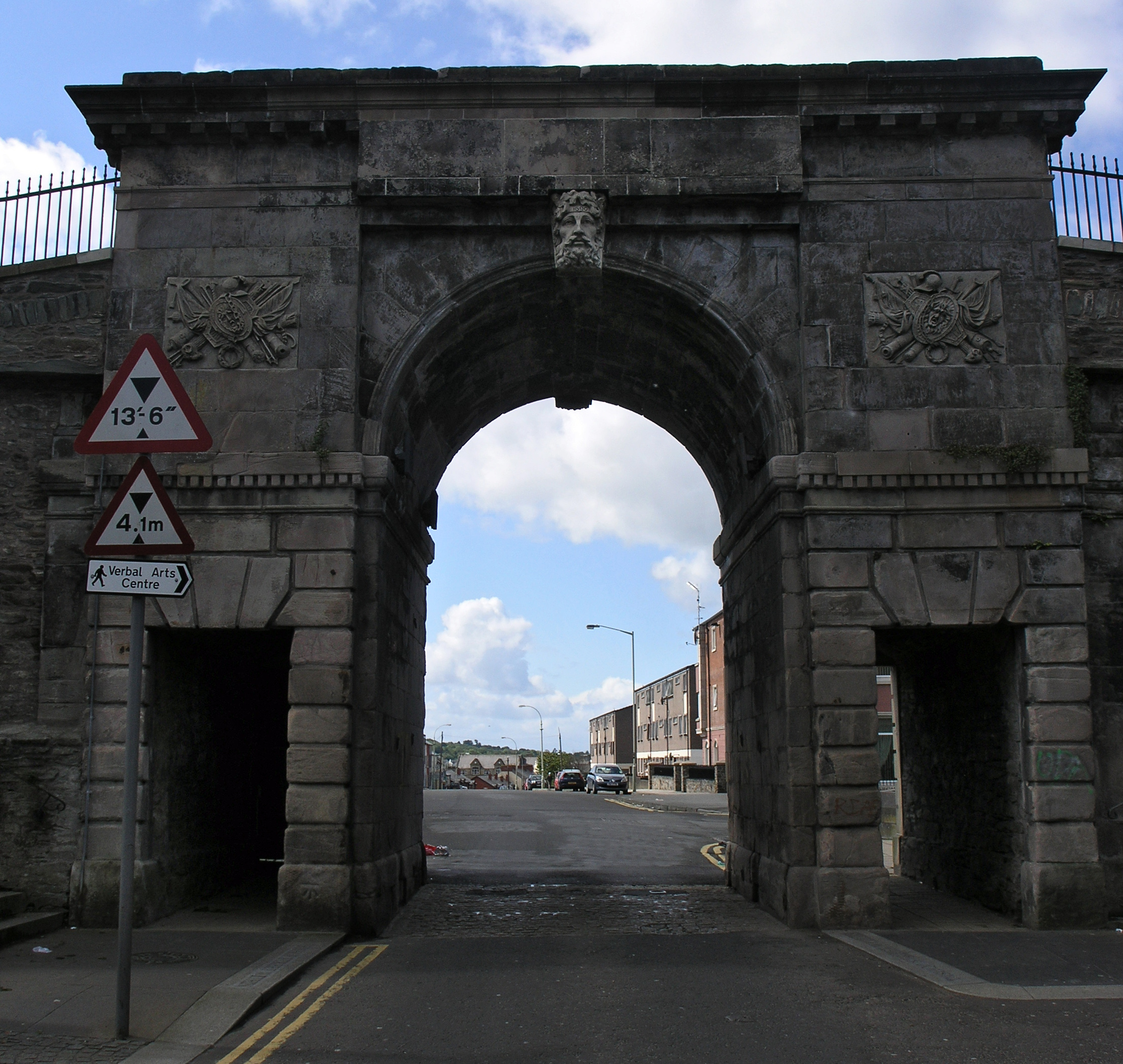
The Walls of Derry

He was born in London, one of seven children of John and Margaret Benson, and started life as a bricklayer and tiler, before gaining a reputation as an architect. He was chosen to build the Walls of Derry in 1614. The works were completed in 1619 and cost £10000; in 1624 Benson was still owed a part of his fee for the work, although this did not prevent him from amassing a considerable fortune. The walls were so well constructed that they withstood the Siege of Derry in 1689, and are still largely intact today.

Benson benefited from the Plantation of Ulster, and received several generous grants of lands, mainly at Shraghmiclar, Lifford, County Donegal, where he received 1500 acres, some of which he leased out. He also laid out the new town of Stranorlar on his estate and built a manor house there. He became a burgess of Derry in 1621 under the new charter, and was Mayor of Derry in 1639. He died in the city on 24 August 1642.

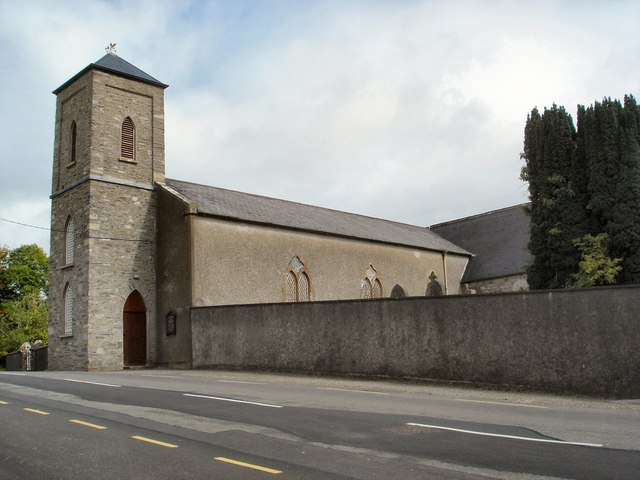
Stranorlar Church: Benson laid out the new town

He married firstly Jane Hobson at Barton-upon-Humber, Lincolnshire, in 1597; they had six children. He married secondly, in about 1608, Margaret Pateshall and had another four children; she was still living at Stranorlar in 1654.

Of his children, the best known are Richard and Prudence, who were both probably children of his first marriage. Richard inherited the family's estates at Stranorlar and at Elagh More, near Derry city. He became a military commander, and held the town of Barnstaple in Devon against the Royalists during the English Civil War. Prudence married in 1625 Thomas Knox, Bishop of the Isles, who died young only three years later, leaving a son; their descendants lived mainly in Ireland, where they married into the prominent Grogan family of Johnstown Castle, County Wexford.

Peter in his last will, drawn up the day before he died, made generous provisions for Richard, including the manor house at Stranorlar, and left legacies to Prudence and her son Thomas Knox junior. The bulk of his estate was left to his widow Margaret and their children. She and her eldest son Peter junior were named as joint executors of the estate.

== Sources ==
- Loeber, Rolf Biographical Dictionary of Architects in Ireland 1600–1720 John Murray London 1981
- Lunney, Linde "Benson, Peter" Cambridge Dictionary of Irish Biography 2009
