= Askomill House =

Castle in Argyll and Bute, Scotland

Askomill House (Askomull House)
- near Campbeltown, Kintyre, Scotland

Askomill House, also known as Askomull House, was a fortified house north east of Campbeltown, Kintyre, Argyll and Bute, Scotland.

== History ==
=== 16th century ===
Angus MacDonald, 8th of Dunnyveg, while at his Kintyre house in 1598, was surrounded by 100-200 armed men led by his son James MacDonald who had been sent by the Privy Council to seek his father's submission to King James VI of Scotland. Angus refused to come out from his house and suffered burns after his son James set fire to the house and was subsequently captured and held in irons at Smerby Castle.
