= Archibald MacDonald of Gigha =

Archibald MacDonald of Gigha, Gilleashuig Dubh, was a son of Angus MacDonald, 8th of Dunnyveg. Archibald was granted lands on Gigha for life in a charter in 1576, which were confirmed in 1582 and by the crown in 1598. Archibald was confined as a hostage for his father and brother in Dumbarton Castle and attempted an escape from the castle in 1607. He died in 1618.

== Family ==
He had issue;

- John
- Hugh
- Archibald
