= Angus Og MacDonald (d.1615) =

Angus Og MacDonald (died 8 July 1615) was a son of Angus MacDonald, 8th of Dunnyveg and Mary, daughter of Hector Og Maclean of Duart.

He retook Dunyvaig Castle which had been taken by his brother Ranald Og. He tried to negotiate a lease of crown lands on Islay, the rights to Dunyvaig Castle, and a pardon for all crimes up to date with Andrew Knox for the surrender of Dunyvaig Castle. Knox left his son Thomas and his nephew John Knox of Ranfurly as hostages for his good faith. The Privy Council, refused these terms and directed Knox to capture the castle by force.

The hostages were released on assurances from John Graham that the royal expedition would be called off. On 6 January 1615, Sir John Campbell of Calder, with the assistance of Sir Oliver Lambart, laid siege to Dunyvaig Castle and captured it and took Angus Og as a prisoner.

Angus was tried and found guilty of high treason on 3 July 1615. He was executed at Grassmarket, Edinburgh on 8 July. His wife Katherine and two boys were requested to attend the Privy Council to be tried for treason, however, Katherine fled with her boys to Holland.

== Family ==
By his wife, Katherine, daughter of Duncan Campbell of Danna, they had;

- Thomas
- Andreas
