= Ranald MacDonald of Smerby =

Ranald MacDonald of Smerby, also known as Ranald MacJames (Scottish Gaelic: Raghnall mac Séamuis) was a son of James MacDonald, 6th of Dunnyveg and Agnes Campbell, daughter of Colin Campbell, 3rd Earl of Argyll. He was granted Smerby Castle from his father. He was a hostage for the good behaviour of his family together with his nephew James held by Sir Lachlan Mor Maclean. He was in charge of the garrison of troops within Loch Gorm Castle and surrendered the castle to Sir John Campbell of Cawdor on 28 January 1615. Ranald died in 1616, and was buried at Saddell Abbey.

== Family ==
By his wife, a daughter of Bannatyne of Kames, their children were:

- Coll
- Archibald, who had issue, Coll and Archibald.
- Donald Gorm, who was a party to the surrender of Loch Gorm Castle.
- Mary, who married Ranald Macdonald of Benbecula, had issue.
