= Derry city walls =

Defensive Fortification in Derry, Northern Ireland

The original gates to the Walls of Derry

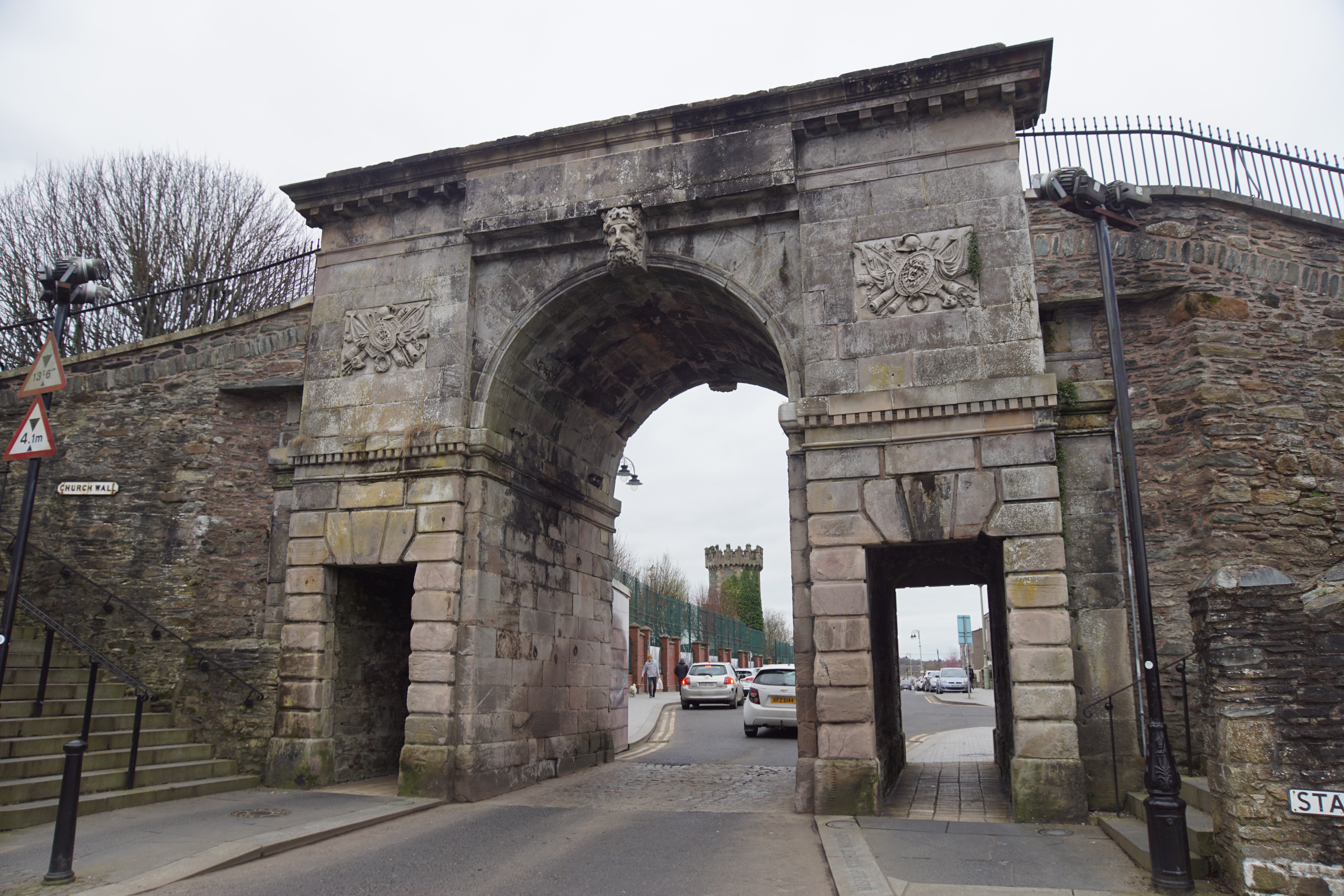
Bishop's Gate

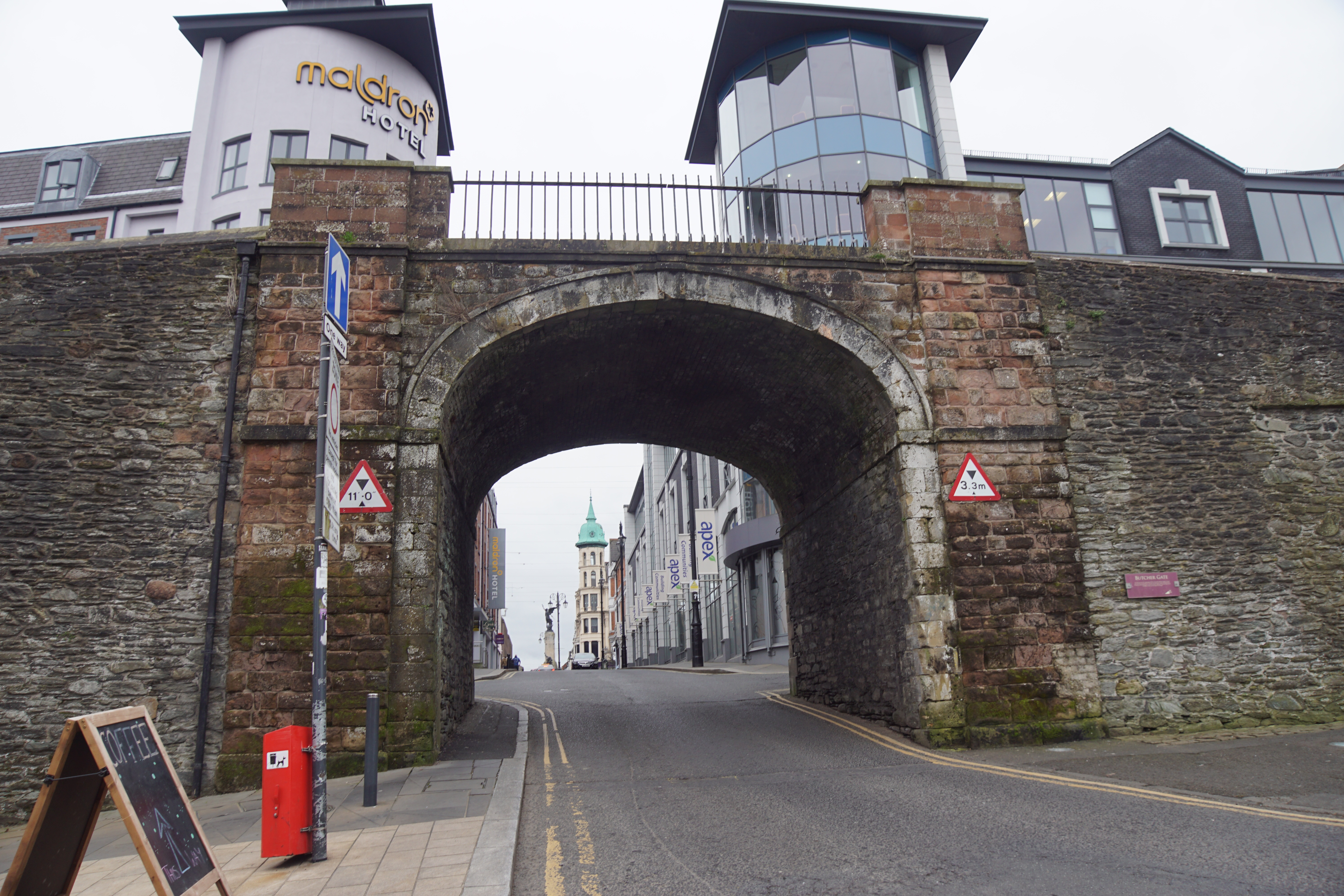
Butcher Gate

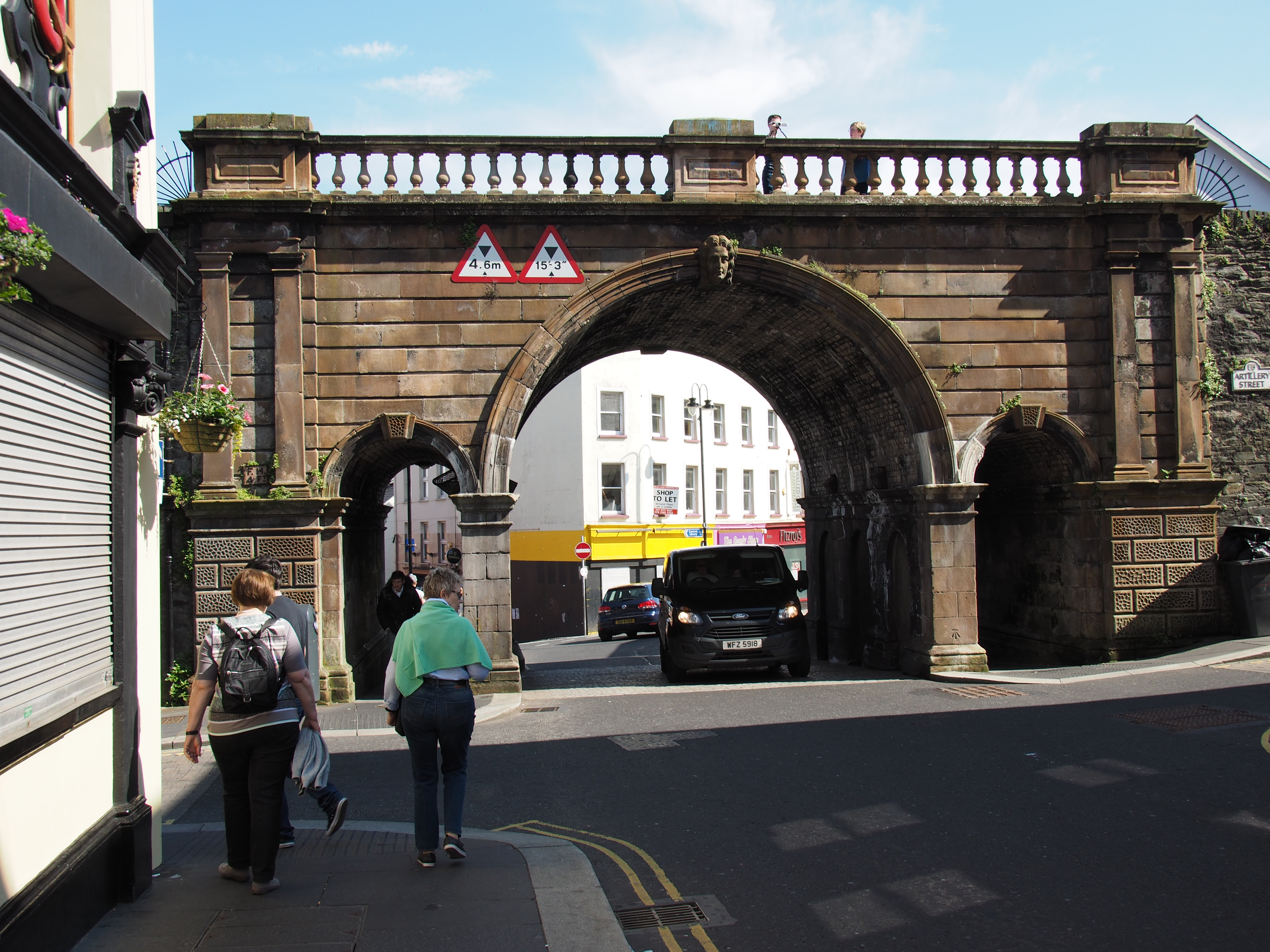
Ferryquay Gate

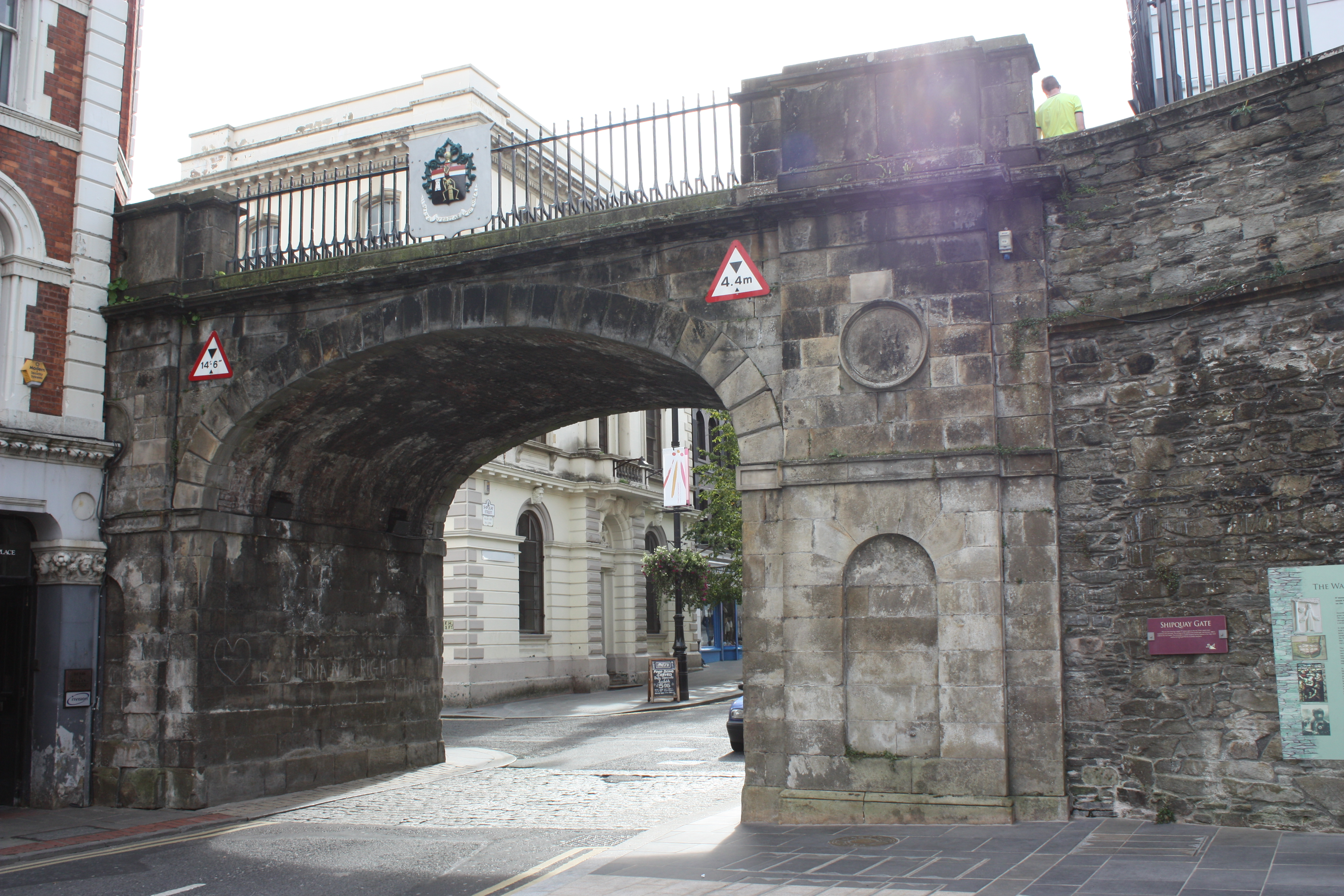
Shipquay Gate

Derry's walls, also known as the Walls of Derry, were originally built by the Irish Society between 1613 and 1619, under the supervision of the London builder and architect Peter Benson. They were built with the intention of protecting the Scottish and English planters that had moved to Ulster as part of the Plantation of Ulster that had been established by James I. It was a direct consequence of the previous settlement being destroyed by Irish chieftain Cahir O'Doherty during O'Doherty's rebellion. As a result of the building of the city's defences by the Irish Society, which was a consortium of livery companies based out of the City of London, the city was officially renamed Londonderry in the 1613 royal charter. This is what has subsequently led to the naming dispute for the city and county of Derry/Londonderry.

The walls are at the centre of the historic city of Derry and within them are a number of Derry's most important landmarks including the Apprentice Boys' Hall and St. Columb's Cathedral (the first ever purpose-built Protestant cathedral).

== History ==
=== Siege of Derry ===
The Siege of Derry was the first major conflict that occurred during the Williamite War in Ireland. It began when 13 apprentices took the keys for the city's gates and locked them against the advancing forces of the Earl of Antrim who were loyal to James II. As Antrim did not have enough men to lay siege to the city, he retreated to Coleraine.

On 18 April 1689, the siege would begin in earnest when forces loyal to the king arrived and ordered the city to surrender. Soon James himself would also arrive and ask the city to surrender, but the city refused. The siege would continue until 1 August when ships carrying food and supplies broke through the boom across the River Foyle and relieved the city.

The fact that the city's walls have never been breached gave rise to one of its nicknames; the Maiden City.

=== The Troubles ===
When the Apprentice Boys March that commemorated the closing of the gates passed through the city in August 1969, some threw pennies from the city walls towards the Catholic majority Bogside. The march was already seen as provocative to many of the city's Catholic population and, along with the tension that had already been building, rioting broke out that turned into the Battle of the Bogside.

For most of the Troubles, the walls were closed off to the general public. However, in August 1973 an IRA bomb was detonated on the walls in a successful effort to destroy the Walker Monument. The monument was a 100 ft column and statue of siege hero, Governor George Walker that had been erected in 1828. Especially given its prominence facing the Bogside, many nationalists found it an offensive symbol of Protestant ascendancy, hence why the IRA targeted it for destruction. The section of the wall that contained the monument remained closed, until it was reopened in 2010 (although the column and statue have never been rebuilt).

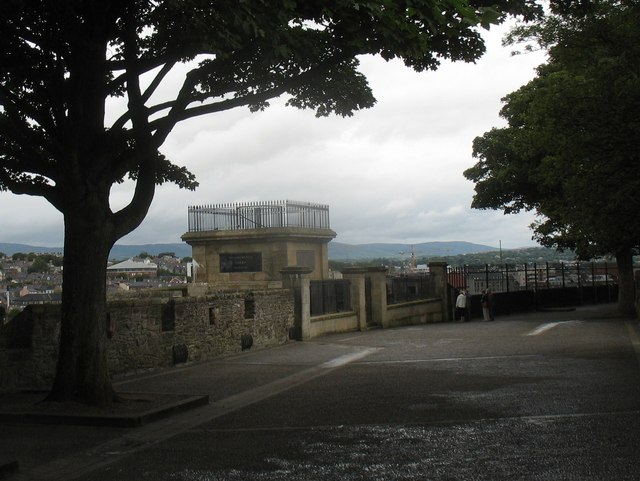
The Walker Plinth, on the Walls of Derry

== Layout ==
The walls are about 1 mile in circumference and contain many of the city's most important landmarks. The entire length of the walls is fully accessible on foot. There are seven gates in total, four of which were built at the same time as the walls themselves and three were added later.

- Ferryquay Gate is one of the original four gates and gave access to the ferry quay on the River Foyle. This was the first gate to be closed by the Apprentice Boys during the siege of Derry.
- Shipquay Gate is one of the original four gates and originally gave near-direct access to the River Foyle, before the land that became the Guildhall was reclaimed from the river.
- Bishop's Gate is one of the original four gates. The original gate was replaced with a triumphal arch in 1789.
- Butcher's Gate is one of the original four gates and was named for the street immediately inside the walls where many of the city's butchers were based.
- New Gate was built in the 1790s and reinforced during the tensions that led to the 1798 United Irish rebellion.
- Castle Gate was built between 1805 and 1808.
- Magazine Gate is the most recent gate to be added, being built in 1888 and giving access directly to the riverfront.

== Cannons ==
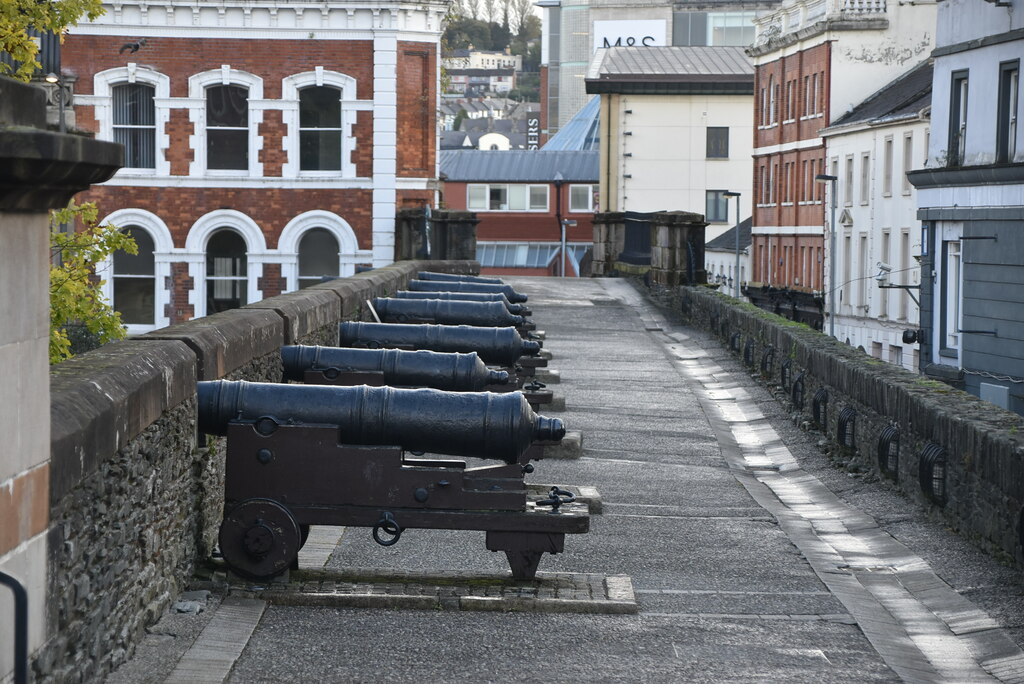
Cannons of the Walls of Derry

The walls are lined with 22 cannons from the 16th, 17th and 18th centuries; other cannons can be found displayed elsewhere in the city. Derry boasts the largest collection of cannons whose precise origins are known, with many of them being used during the Siege of Derry. In 2005, 24 of the cannons (including two displayed at Brook Hall) were restored to their former glory, with the famous 'Roaring Meg' located at the double bastion near Bishop Gate.
