= Battle of Ardnaree =

- Part of the Tudor conquest of Ireland
Date	23 September 1586
Location	near Ardnaree, County Mayo
Result	Anglo-Irish victory

Belligerents
Kingdom of Ireland	Scots Mercenaries Irish Rebels

Commanders and leaders
Sir Richard Bingham	MacDonnell of Carey †; MacDonnell of Glenarm †

Strength
?	?

Casualties and losses
?	c. 2,000

The Battle of Ardnaree took place during the Tudor conquest of Ireland at Ardnaree (now a suburb of Ballina, County Mayo (Note: In 1586, Ardnaree was in County Sligo. The River Moy was the county boundary from the shiring of Connacht in 1585 until the Local Government (Ireland) Act 1898, under which the area around Ardnaree was transferred to Mayo as part of the hinterland of Ballina.)) on 23 September 1586. The result was a victory for the English over the MacPhillips' and Burkes. The conflict was a part of the political and military struggle, involving the English and occasionally the Scots, for control of northern Ireland. Ardnaree is the anglicised version of Árd na Ríogh, which can be translated as meaning 'Height of the Kings' or 'Hill of the Kings'.

The Mac Philbins and Mayo Burkes had risen in revolt against English rule in Ireland. An Irish-Scottish mercenary army, led by Donnell Gorm MacDonnell of Carey and Alexander Carragh MacDonnell of Glenarm, sons of the deceased James MacDonald, 6th of Dunnyveg, were invited into Connacht by the Burkes to attack English settlements and forces. The mercenary army was fronted at Sligo, Coolony and Ballingafad by English forces for over fourteen days.

Sir Richard Bingham, the Governor of Connacht, followed the mercenary force to Ardnaree, where the mercenary force had camped on the east (right) bank of the River Moy. Bingham's forces surrounded the camp at night and attacked the occupants. During the battle, 1,000 mercenaries were killed, including Donnell Gorm MacDonnell of Carey and Alexander Carragh MacDonnell of Glenarm. Also slaughtered were some 1,000 men, women and children in the camp.

Sir Richard Bingham went on to hang the leaders of the Burkes, with the former lands of Mac Philbins and Mayo Burkes given to English settlers.

== See also ==
- List of Irish battles

== Sources ==
- The Oxford Companion to Irish History
- Falls, Cyril (1997). Elizabeth's Irish Wars. Syracuse University Press. pp. 158–161. ISBN 9780815604358.
