= Archibald MacDonald, 7th of Dunnyveg =

Clan Chief of Clan MacDonald of Dunnyveg

Archibald MacDonald Archibald Mac Dòmhnuill
- Title: 7th Clan Chief
- Predecessor: James MacDonald, 6th of Dunnyveg
- Successor: Angus MacDonald, 8th of Dunnyveg

Archibald MacDonald (Scottish Gaelic: Archibald Mac Dòmhnuill), 7th of Dunnyveg, was the lord of Clan MacDonald of Dunnyveg.

== Biography ==
The eldest son of Sir James MacDonald and Lady Agnes Campbell, Archibald received a charter for lands forming a part of the barony of Bar in Kintyre on 5 May 1564 from Mary, Queen of Scots. He took over the lordship after his father's death following his capture during the battle of Glentaisie and imprisoned in Ireland in May 1565.

He led an unsuccessful raid to release his uncle, Sorley Boy MacDonnell, from imprisonment. He is alleged to have died ca. 1569, without issue, for his younger brother Angus became chief of Clan MacDonald of Dunnyveg.
