= Archie P. McDonald =

American historian and author of Texan topics

- Born: Archie Philip McDonald; November 29, 1935; Beaumont, Texas, U.S.
- Died: August 16, 2012 (aged 76); Nacogdoches Medical Center, Nacogdoches, Texas

Archie Philip McDonald (November 29, 1935 – August 16, 2012) was an American historian with a focus on the history of Texas. He served as director of the East Texas Historical Association as well as editor of the East Texas Historical Journal, from 1971 until his 2008 retirement, a 37 year span. For over 40 years of his life, he was faculty at Stephen F. Austin State University, and during his tenure also served as the university's community liaison. By 1983, he had authored 16 books, largely about Texan history; that number had risen to over 20 by 2003.

== Personal life ==
Archie McDonald was married to Judy McDonald, mayor emeritus of Nacogdoches. Together they won the Ralph W. Steen Memorial East Texan of the Year Award in 2009.

Archie died on August 16, 2012, and his memorial service was held August 20.

=== Education ===
McDonald graduated from French High School in 1954, received a B.S. from Lamar University in 1958, an M.A. from Rice University in 1960, and his Ph.D. from Louisiana State University in 1965.

== Recognition ==
A speaker series, the Archie McDonald Speaker Series, was established in 2010 in honor of his impact. Other awards he received during his lifetime include the Mary Jon and J. P. Bryan Leadership in Education Award from the Texas State Historical Association (TSHA) in 2004, following a TSHA Fellowship in 1984. McDonald also served as president of TSHA from 1985 to 1986.
