= Angus MacDonald, 8th of Dunnyveg =

James MacDonald Aonghus Mac Dòmhnuill
- Title: 8th Clan Chief
- Predecessor: Archibald MacDonald, 7th of Dunnyveg
- Successor: James MacDonald, 9th of Dunnyveg

Angus MacDonald, 8th of Dunnyveg (Scottish Gaelic: Aonghus Mac Dòmhnuill, died 21 October 1614) was the Chief of Clan MacDonald of Dunnyveg.

== Life ==
MacDonald was the son of James MacDonald, 6th of Dunnyveg (died 1565) and Agnes Campbell, daughter of Colin Campbell, 3rd Earl of Argyll. He went to Islay and Kintyre to renew the conflict with Clan Maclean. In 1579, upon information of mutual hostilities committed by their followers, the king and council commanded Sir Lachlan Mor Maclean and MacDonald, to subscribe assurances of indemnity to each other, under the pain of high treason, and the quarrel was, for the time, patched up by the marriage of MacDonald with MacLean's sister Mary. In 1585, however, the feud came to a height, and after involving nearly the whole of the island clans on one side or the other, and causing its disastrous consequences to be felt throughout the whole extent of the Hebrides, by the mutual ravages of the contending parties, government interfered, and measures were at last adopted for reducing to obedience the turbulent chiefs, who had caused so much bloodshed and distress in the Isles.

In 1598, his son James, who was in dispute with his father, surrounded his father's residence Askomill House with between two or three hundred armed men. Angus refused to surrender to his son, with the house being set on fire and Angus being taken prisoner and being held captive at Smerby Castle.

Andrew Stuart, 3rd Lord Ochiltree led a royal expedition against Angus in 1608, whereupon Angus surrendered the castles of Dunnyveg and Lochgorme. In May, Angus presented himself to the privy council at Edinburgh were he committed in Blackness Castle. He was released to accompany Andrew Knox, Bishop of the Isles and was present at Iona when the Statutes of Icolmkill was consented to.

MacDonald travelled to Edinburgh for an audience with the King and gave sureties for his reappearance before the Privy Council in May 1611. He died at Rothesay on 21 October 1614, and was buried at Saddell Abbey.

== Family ==
By his wife, Mary, daughter of Hector Og Maclean of Duart, their children were:

- James, 9th of Dunnyveg, d. 1626, London, England.
- Angus Og, married Katherine, daughter of Duncan Campbell of Danna, had issue.
- Alexander Og MacDonald, married unknown, had issue, drowned on 3 October 1613.
- Mary, married Sir Donald Macdonald of Clanranald.
- Margaret, who married Ranald Macdonald of Benbecula.
- Annabella, who married Archibald Macdonald of Largie.

He also allegedly fathered three sons:

- Archibald MacDonald of Gigha
- Alexander MacDonald
- Ranald Og
