= Angus McDonald (footballer) =

Australian rules footballer

Personal information
- Full name: Angus Fraser McDonald
- Born: 26 October 1890; Stuart Mill, Victoria
- Died: 20 October 1953 (aged 62); St Arnaud, Victoria
- Original team: Port Melbourne (VFA)

Playing career^{1}
Years	Club	Games (Goals)
1914	St Kilda	2 (1)
- ^{1} Playing statistics correct to the end of 1914.

Angus Fraser McDonald (26 October 1890 – 20 October 1953) was an Australian rules footballer who played for the St Kilda Football Club in the Victorian Football League (VFL).
