= Lagavulin Bay =

Bay on the south of Islay, Scotland

Coordinates: 55.633°N 6.127°W

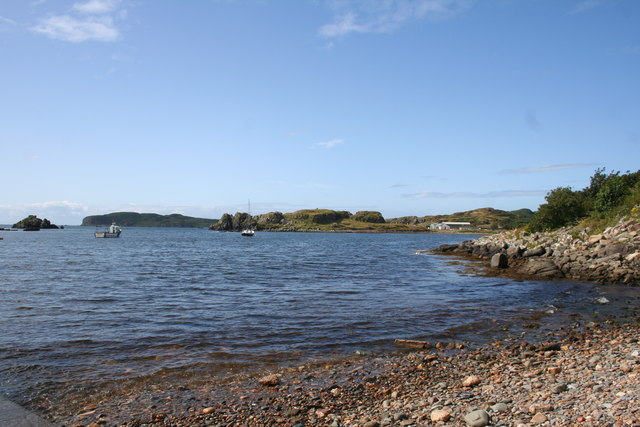
Lagavulin Bay

Lagavulin Bay is a bay on the south of Islay, Scotland.

Directly in this bay lies the Lagavulin distillery. The name Lagavulin is an anglicisation of Lag a' Mhuilinn, Scottish Gaelic for hollow of the mill.
