= Sandy MacDonald =

Sandy MacDonald or variants may refer to:

- Sandy MacDonald (sailor) (Samuel Alexander MacDonald, 1904–2003), Canadian competitive sailor
- Sandy MacDonald (rugby union) (1853–1928), Irish rugby union player
- Sandy McDonald (Alexander McDonald, 1937–2016), Scottish minister
- Sandy Macdonald (John Alexander Lindsay Macdonald, born 1954), former Australian politician

== See also ==
- Sandy (given name)
- Macdonald (name) (for surnames Macdonald, MacDonald, and McDonald)
