= Alexander Macdonald (antiquary) =

Alexander Macdonald FSA Scot (c. 1791 – 1850) was a Scottish antiquary.

== Life ==
In early life, Macdonald was employed in the Register House, Edinburgh, where he assisted Thomas Thomson in the preparation of the Acts of the Scottish Parliament and other works. In 1824 he was elected a fellow of the Society of Antiquaries of Scotland, and in 1837 joint curator of the society's museum. In 1836 he was appointed principal keeper of the register of deeds and probate writs. He died at Edinburgh on 23 December 1850, aged about 59. He had supplied material for Sir Walter Scott's notes to the Waverley Novels.

== Works ==
Macdonald is best known as editor of the publications of the Maitland Club. The volumes edited by him were:

- The Register of Ministers, Exhorters, and Readers of the Church of Scotland, 1830.
- Maitland Club Miscellany, vols. i. and ii. 1834.
- Adam Blackwood's History of Mary, Queen of Scots, 1834.
- Report on the State of certain Parishes in Scotland, 1835.
- Letters to King James the Sixth, 1835.
- Papers relative to the Royal Guard of Scottish Archers in France, 1835.
- Letters to the Argyll Family, 1839.

For the Bannatyne Club he edited Registrum Honoris de Morton, 1853.

== Notes ==
Attribution

This article incorporates text from a publication now in the public domain: Lee, Sidney, ed. (1893). "Macdonald, Alexander (1791?-1850)". Dictionary of National Biography. Vol. 35. London: Smith, Elder & Co.
