= James MacDonald, 6th of Dunnyveg =

Scottish-Gaelic lord

James MacDonald Séamus Mac Dhòmhnaill
- Born: c. 1501; Scotland
- Died: 5 July 1565 near Strabane, Tír Eoghain, Ireland
- Title: 6th Clan Chief
- Predecessor: Alexander MacDonald, 5th of Dunnyveg
- Successor: Archibald MacDonald, 7th of Dunnyveg
- Spouse: Lady Agnes Campbell

James MacDonald (Note: Also anglicised MacDonnell and MacConnel) (Scottish Gaelic: Séamus Mac Dhòmhnaill; c. 1501 – 5 July 1565), 6th Chief of Clan MacDonald of Dunnyveg, was a Scottish-Gaelic lord.

== Biography ==
MacDonald was the son of Alexander MacDonald, lord of Islay and Kintyre (Cantire), and Catherine MacDonald, daughter of the Lord of Ardnamurchan.

His wife was Lady Agnes Campbell, daughter of Colin Campbell, 3rd Earl of Argyll and his wife Lady Jean Gordon. They married in 1545, forming an alliance. The same year, he was elected Lord of the Isles, making MacDonald and Campbell significant figures in Scotland.

To further solidify the bond between the families, the Earl of Argyll granted MacDonald his "four score merklands" of Ardnamurchan, to be held by MacDonald under the Earl and his successors, and with seisin following immediately after. MacDonald had to pay 1000 merks for these lands, which was considerably under their real value.

He organised the release of his brother, Sorley Boy MacDonnell, in 1551, in exchange for George Bustsyde, a prisoner he held after a battle on the island of Reachrainn (now Rathlin Island).

In 1560, James MacDonald and the Earl of Argyll made a bond to resist any French incursions in Ireland, but MacDonald changed his position after Mary, Queen of Scots returned from France to rule Scotland in person, and his wife was received at court.

During the Battle of Glentasie on 2 May 1565, MacDonald and Sorley Boy were captured by Shane O'Neill and imprisoned. MacDonald succumbed to his wounds shortly after being captured, while being imprisoned at Castle Crocke, near Strathbane.

== Family ==
By his wife, Agnes, daughter of Colin Campbell, 3rd Earl of Argyll and Lady Jean Gordon, he was the father of:

- Archibald MacDonald, 7th of Dunnyveg, died without issue in 1569.
- Angus MacDonald, 8th of Dunnyveg, died circa 1613.
- Ranald MacDonald of Smerby, married a daughter of Bannatyne of Kames, died 1616.
- Coll MacDonald, died at Eilean Mor Cormac.
- Donald Gorm MacDonald of Carey, killed during the Battle of Ardnaree, Ireland in 1586.
- Alexander Carragh MacDonald of Glenarm, also killed during the Battle of Ardnaree, Ireland in 1586.
- Finola MacDonald, married Sir Hugh O'Donnell, Chief of Clan O'Donnell and King of Tír Chonaill. Through him she became the mother to Red Hugh O'Donnell, Rory O'Donnell, 1st Earl of Tyrconnell, and Cathbar O'Donnell.
- Catherine MacDonald, married Shane O'Neill
