= Alexander Og MacDonald =

Alexander Og MacDonald (died 3 October 1613) was a son of Angus MacDonald, 8th of Dunnyveg and Mary, daughter of Hector Og Maclean of Duart. He had a daughter Margaret to an unknown woman. Alexander drowned on 3 October 1613 in Caol Ile (Sound of Islay). Margaret married Hector MacAlister of Ardincross in 1626.
