= Angus Macdonald (obstetrician) =

Scottish physician, obstetrician and lecturer

Angus Macdonald FRSE FRCPE (18 April 1836 – 10 February 1886), was a Scottish physician, obstetrician and lecturer at the University of Edinburgh. He served as President of the Edinburgh Obstetrical Society from 1879 to 1881.

== Early life ==
Macdonald was born in Aberdeen, Aberdeenshire, Scotland, he was the son of Margaret Bremner of Newmill, Banffshire and her husband, James Macdonald of Lochmaddy, North Uist, a road contractor. His father died when he was 11, leaving a widow and five children. He went to work as a farm labourer in Grange, Banffshire; his formal education was limited to two years in the parish school as a result. However, supported by the local schoolmaster, Arthur Gerrard, and his mother, Margaret Bremner Macdonald, "a woman of character and of vigorous intellect", he won a competitive scholarship to King's College, Aberdeen at the age of 19.

Macdonald received his general degree (MA) in 1859 and was awarded the Hutton Prize. He spent a year studying theology at the University of Edinburgh before switching to study medicine, graduating with an MD in 1865. His thesis was entitled "Notes of three renal cases illustrative of vasomotor neuroses."

== Medical career ==
From 1864 he began practicing as a GP in Edinburgh and lecturing in pharmacology and midwifery at the University of Edinburgh.

In addition to starting a private medical practice, Macdonald lectured frequently and served as the Physician to the Royal Infirmary and the Physician to the Royal Maternity Hospital. He became a fellow of the Royal College of Surgeons in 1865 and a fellow of the Royal College of Physicians in 1869. He authored many articles in The Lancet. In 1866 he was elected a member of the Harveian Society of Edinburgh. In 1871 he was elected a Fellow of the Royal Society of Edinburgh his proposer being Sir William Turner.

In 1878, he published "On The Bearings of Chronic Disease of the Heart Upon Pregnancy, Parturition, and Childbed," a textbook in obstetrics in use for over 50 years. In 1879, he became President of the Obstetrics Society of Edinburgh, which he held until 1881. A group of obstetricians in the UK named their society the Macdonald Club in his honour, and in 2008 the Royal Medical Society began publishing an Obstetrics Journal dedicated in his memory.

== Death ==
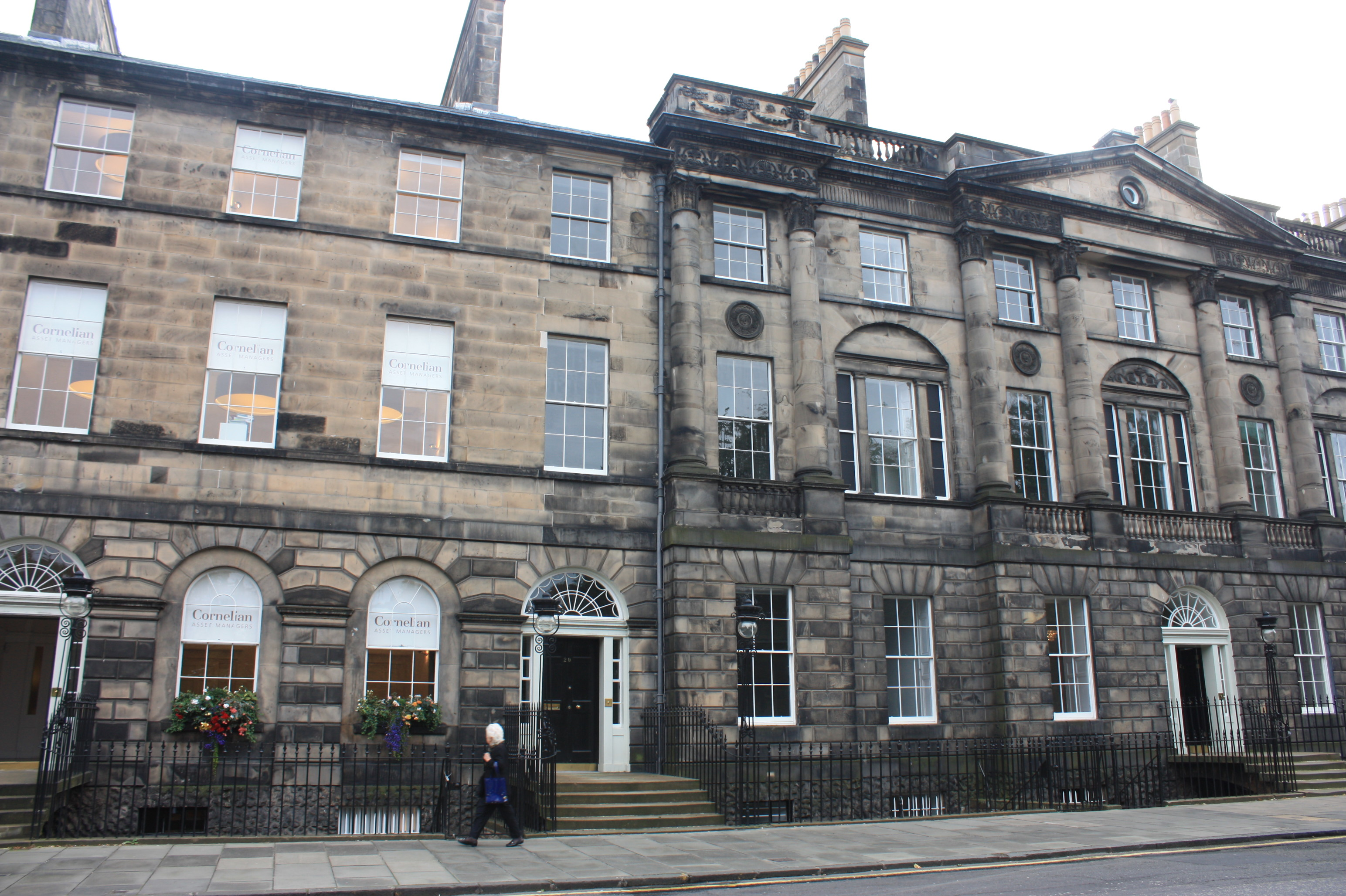
29 Charlotte Square, Edinburgh

During the last four years of his life, Macdonald had a recurrent lung infection. Advised by his physicians to reduce his commitments, he spent a year in the Riviera. He died at home, 29 Charlotte Square on 10 February 1886. After his death the house was bought and occupied by a former junior colleague, Dr David Berry Hart.
