= Loch Gorm Castle =

Ruined castle in Argyll and Bute, Scotland

Coordinates: 55.8034°N 6.4142°W

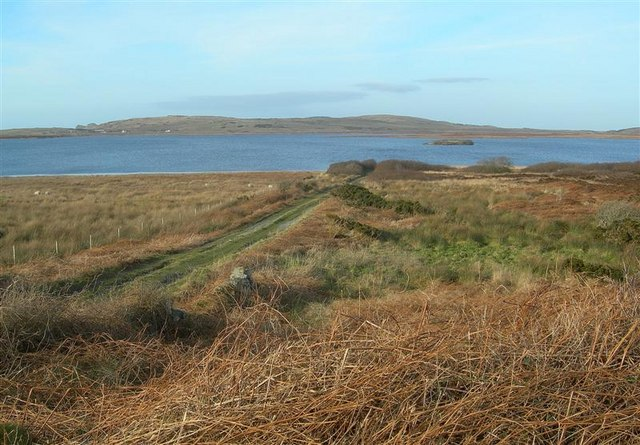
Loch Gorm Castle, on the very small island in the distance

Loch Gorm Castle is a ruined castle located on Eilean Mòr (big island) on Loch Gorm, Islay, Scotland. It was built in the early 15th century (generally dated to around the 1430s) and served as a stronghold for Clan Donald.

The castle was square, with a round bastion at each corner. The ruins, however, are heavily overgrown, and reduced to a low level, such that from the shoreline the island looks featureless.

In 1578, the castle was occupied temporarily by Sir Lachlan Mor Maclean of Duart, as part of his campaign to recover/seize the Rinns of Islay. He was ejected by the MacDonalds of Dunnyveg, with the assistance of the Colin Campbell, 6th Earl of Argyll (Lachlan's cousin). Ruinous from 1586, royal forces led by Andrew Stuart, 3rd Lord Ochiltree demolished the castle in 1608. Repaired afterwards, Ranald MacDonald of Smerby was in charge of the garrison of troops within Loch Gorm Castle and surrendered the castle to Sir John Campbell of Cawdor on 28 January 1615. Sir James MacDonald, 9th of Dunnyveg retook the island in April 1615 and left a garrison upon Eilean Mór. A private garrison was maintained upon Eilean Mór between 1639 and 1640.
