= Colin Campbell, 3rd Earl of Argyll =

Scottish nobleman

Colin Campbell
- 3rd Earl of Argyll
- Tenure: 9 September 1513 – 9 October 1529
- Predecessor: Archibald Campbell, 2nd Earl of Argyll
- Successor: Archibald Campbell, 4th Earl of Argyll
- Born: ca. 1486; Glen Orchy, Argyll, Scotland
- Died: 9 October 1529; Lochgoilhead, Argyll, Scotland
- Buried: Kilmun Parish Church, Cowal, Scotland
- Residence: Castle Campbell
- Noble family: Campbell
- Spouse: Lady Jean Gordon
- Issue: Archibald Campbell, 4th Earl of Argyll; John Campbell, 1st of Lochnell; Elizabeth Campbell, Countess of Moray; Agnes Campbell, Lady of Dunnyveg
- Parents: Archibald Campbell, 2nd Earl of Argyll; Lady Elizabeth Stuart

Colin Campbell, 3rd Earl of Argyll (c. 1486 – 9 October 1529) was a Scottish nobleman and soldier. He was also known as "Cailen Malloch".

== Life ==
Colin Campbell was the son of Archibald Campbell, 2nd Earl of Argyll and Lady Elizabeth Stewart, daughter of John Stewart, 1st Earl of Lennox. In 1506/07, he married Lady Jean Gordon, the eldest daughter of Alexander Gordon, 3rd Earl of Huntly by his first wife, Lady Jean Stewart. He succeeded as Earl of Argyll upon the death of his father on 9 September 1513.

Campbell led an army against the insurrection of various Highland chieftains; a few years later, he joined the court of King James V of Scotland. He was given the position of Lord Warden of the Marches, and in 1528, Lord Justice General of Scotland. He died on 9 October 1529, and was buried at Kilmun Parish Church on the Cowal Peninsula, west of Scotland.

Colin Campbell was succeeded by his son, Archibald Campbell. The Campbell family resided at Castle Campbell, near Dollar, Clackmannanshire, Scotland.

== Family ==
Children of Colin Campbell, 3rd Earl of Argyll and Lady Jean Gordon:

- Archibald Campbell, 4th Earl of Argyll (d. bt 21 August 1558 – 2 December 1558), married three times.
- John Campbell, 1st of Lochnell (d. 13 May 1568), was killed at the Battle of Langside.
- Lady Elizabeth Campbell (d. c. 1548), married: firstly, James Stewart, 1st Earl of Moray, an illegitimate son of King James IV of Scotland; secondly, John Gordon, 11th Earl of Sutherland
- Lady Agnes Campbell (b. 1526, d. 1601), married: firstly, James MacDonald, 6th of Dunnyveg; secondly, Sir Turlough Luineach O'Neill of Tír Eoghain, Ireland.

Campbell's sister, Lady Catherine Campbell, survived a murder attempt by her husband, Lachlan Maclean of Duart, in 1527. Maclean rowed out to Lady's Rock in the Firth of Lorne one night at low tide and left his wife stranded.

== Ancestry ==
Ancestors of Colin Campbell, 3rd Earl of Argyll

Archibald Campbell, Master of Campbell
Colin Campbell, 1st Earl of Argyll
Elizabeth Somerville
Archibald Campbell, 2nd Earl of Argyll
John Stewart, 2nd Lord Lorn
Isabel Stewart
Colin Campbell, 3rd Earl of Argyll
Alan Stewart of Darnley
John Stewart, 1st Earl of Lennox
Catherine Seton
Elizabeth Stewart
Alexander Montgomerie
Margaret Montgomerie
Elizabeth Hepburn

== See also ==
- Agnes Campbell

Legal offices
Preceded by ?	Lord Justice General; 1528–1529	Succeeded by The Earl of Argyll
Peerage of Scotland
Preceded by Archibald Campbell	Earl of Argyll; 1513–1529	Succeeded by Archibald Campbell
