= MacDonnell of Antrim =

Irish branch of Clan Donald

Arms of McDonnell of Antrim.

The MacDonnells of Antrim (Gaelic: Mac Domhnaill), also known as the MacDonnells of the Glens, are a branch in Ireland of the Scottish-based Clan Donald. Initially part of Clan MacDonald of Dunnyveg (Clan Donald South), the MacDonnells of Antrim became their own branch in 1558 when Somhairle Buidhe MacDonnell obtained the lordship of the territory in Ireland from James MacDonald, 6th chief of the Clan MacDonald of Dunnyveg.

The MacDonnells of Antrim were a sept of the Clan Donald of the royal Clann Somhairle, that the English crown had attempted to cultivate since the early 14th century in its efforts to influence the course of politics in Scotland. The MacDonnells established a growing presence in Ireland throughout the 15th and 16th centuries, and played a crucial role in the politics of 17th century Ireland. The MacDonnell's achieved much success in Ireland largely to cultural and familial connections to the Gaelic nobility of Ireland.

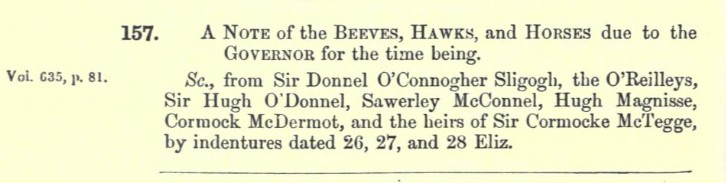
Tribute being paid by Sorley Boy using the common spelling of the MacDonnell name due to its Gaelic pronunciation as Sawerley McConnel.

Today the surname is predominantly spelled McDonnell in Ireland and abroad, although many McConnells are also of the same family, as that is the Gaelic pronunciation of the Mac Domhnaill. Most of the leadership of the Clan wrote their name as a variant of McConnell up until the 17th century, including Sorley Boy MacDonnell himself. Many of the present-day McDonnells have a common descent from Sorley Boy MacDonnell.

== History ==
=== Origins ===
The MacDonnells of Antrim are descended from John Mor MacDonald, chief of the Clan MacDonald of Dunnyveg. John Mor MacDonald was the second son of Good John of Islay, Lord of the Isles, 6th chief of Clan Donald, through John of Islays second marriage to Princess Margaret Stewart, daughter of King Robert II of Scotland.

John Mor MacDonald married Margery Byset, daughter of the Mac Eoin Bissett, Lord of the Glens of Antrim. Although the MacDonnells would a century and a half later claim that her dowry included the lordship itself, this is false because the Mac Eoin Bissetts remained in possession of it into the early or mid 16th century. However following the death in battle, in support of his friends and kinsmen the O'Neills against the O'Donnells, of the last known Mac Eoin Bissett in 1522, the recently arrived MacDonnells appear to have started making their own gains in the region and eventually used the earlier marriage to claim they had rights to the Bissett lordship. The MacDonnells already possessed Dunnyvaig Castle on the Isle of Islay and lands in Kintyre, Scotland.

The MacDonnells of Antrim were originally part of Clan MacDonald of Dunnyveg and did not become a separate branch of until 1558, when Somhairle Buidhe MacDonnell obtained the lordship of the territory in Ireland from James MacDonald, 6th of Dunnyveg.

=== 15th century ===
John Mor was assassinated by James Campbell in 1427. John's son Donald Balloch MacDonald, the second chief, led the clan when they fought and won at the first Battle of Inverlochy (1431). This was in support of their cousin Alexander of Islay, Earl of Ross, 3rd Lord of the Isles and 8th chief of Clan Donald. The MacDonalds were supported by the Clan Cameron. They fought against the Royal forces of the Earl of Mar who was supported by the Clan MacKintosh.

The third Chief, Sir John Mor, with his heir John Cathanach and three grandsons, were apprehended through the treachery of the Macdonald of Ardnamurchan and were executed in Edinburgh for treason. One of his sons, Alexander, fled to Ireland. MacIain of Ardnamurchan, who had also betrayed Alexander MacDonald of Lochalsh, was himself killed in 1518 by those who he had betrayed.

=== 16th century ===
On the death of James MacDonald, the sixth chief of the Clan MacDonald of Dunnyveg and Antrim, the Antrim Glens were seized by one of his younger brothers, Sorley Boy MacDonnell (Somhairle Buidh, "Somhairle of the yellow hair"). Sorley Boy is best known for establishing the MacDonnell clan in Antrim and resisting the campaign of Shane O'Neill and the English crown to expel it from Ireland.

In 1565, under Sorley Boy MacDonnell, it fought the Battle of Glentasie against Shane O'Neill. In April 1583 the MacDonnells, again led by Sorley Boy, who had been fighting in the McQuillan-O'Cahan feud on the side of the Clan McQuillan, decided to betray their allies. Edward McQuillan was killed in the ensuing Battle of Aura, bringing about the end of McQuillan rule over The Route and their seat of Dunluce Castle.

Alaster, the eldest son of Sorley Boy, was killed in 1585, and his head was placed on a spike at Dublin.

=== 17th century ===
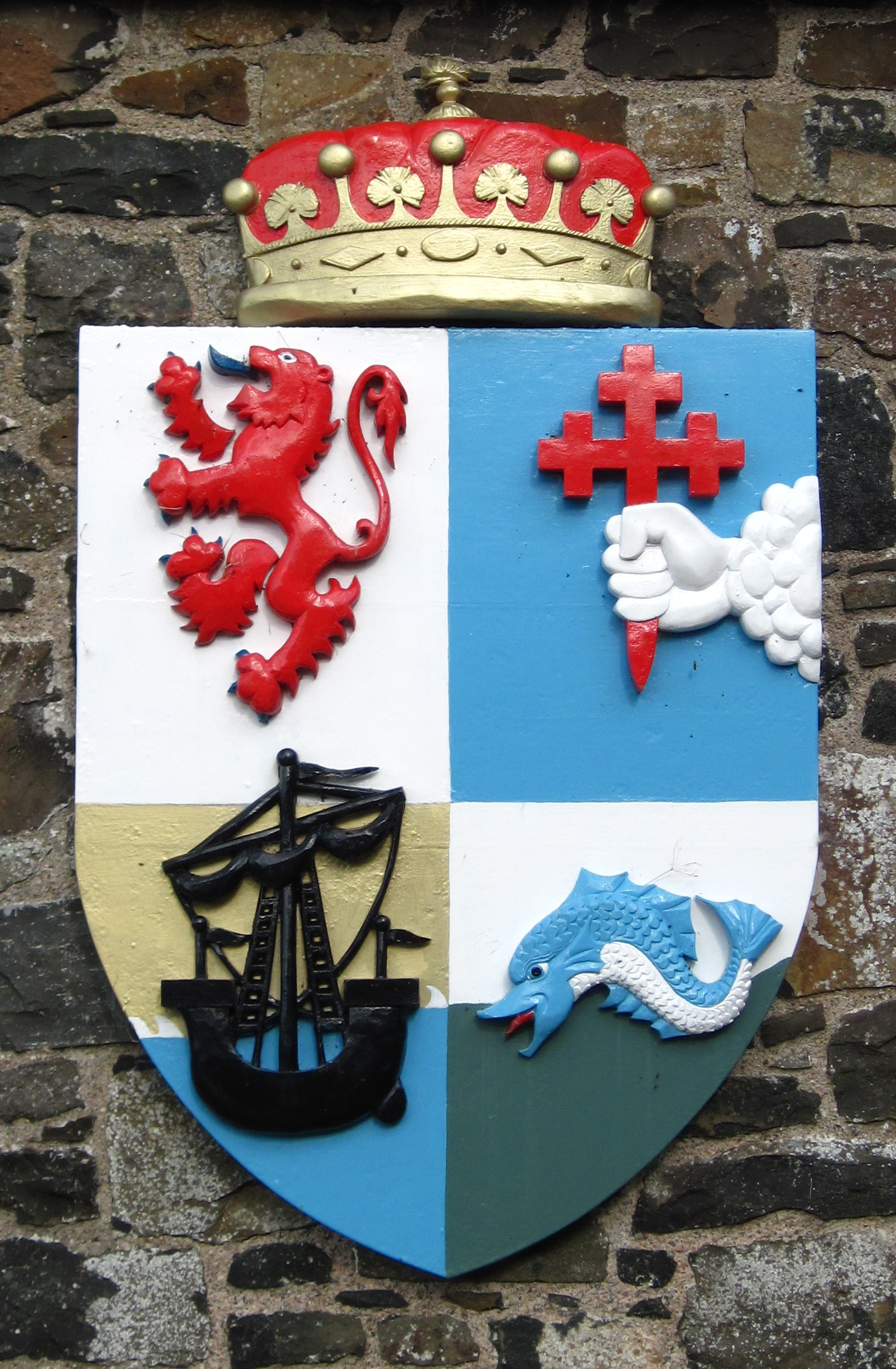
The arms of the MacDonnells of Antrim, as displayed at Dunluce Castle.

Randal MacDonnell was a personal friend and courtier of King Charles I of England. Upon the commencement of the Bishops' Wars between Charles and the Scottish Covenanters, he offered to lead a seaborne expedition against the Covenanter regime on behalf of Charles. This request was granted, but in the end the plans were frustrated by the antipathy of Thomas Wentworth and the success of the Covenanters against the king.

By 1645, however, the Covenanters had broken their truce with Charles by intervening in the English Civil War on the side of Parliament. Randall MacDonnell once again requested to assist the king by orchestrating an expedition from Ireland. This had the aim of both weakening the Covenanters and reclaiming lands from Clan Campbell. The Catholic MacDonnells were pitted against their Campbell foes, who were at the forefront of the puritanical Protestant Covenanter regime. This time, the plans for an expedition came to fruition, with Alasdair MacColla (also known as Alexander MacDonnell) leading a force from Waterford to Scotland. Rallying his Clan Donald kinsmen and joining with the Marquess of Montrose, they inflicted a series of crushing defeats on larger enemy forces.

Perhaps their crowning achievement was when, in a daring winter campaign, the Clan Donald forces undertook a surprise march through the snow-covered mountains into the Campbell heartlands of Argyll, which were considered impregnable. They then scored an overwhelming victory against the Campbell force that was arrayed against them at the Battle of Inverlochy, with chief Archibald Campbell ignominiously fleeing for his life on a barge as the men of his clan were being slaughtered in battle. Alasdair MacColla then occupied Argyll, and chief Randall MacDonnell arrived to join him, but the successes of the Scottish campaign were to be undone by the defeat of the royalists in England. Many MacDonnell troops fell back to Ireland, where they opposed the Cromwellian invasion.

MacDonnell forces supported King James II of England in the Williamite War in Ireland.

== Castles ==
- Dunluce Castle was the seat of MacDonald Earl of Antrim, in Ireland.
- Dunanynie Castle
- Kinbane Castle
- Red Bay Castle
- Dunnyvaig Castle was the Earl of Antrim's seat in Scotland where he headed the Clan MacDonald of Dunnyveg

== Family tree ==
Clan MacDonnell of Antrim family tree including: Marquess of Antrim and Earls of Antrim

Domhnall mac Raghnaill
Aonghus Mór d. c. 1293; Lord of Islay
Aonghus Óg Mac Domhnaill d. 1314 or 1318 or c. 1330; Lord of Islay
John of Islay c. 1320–1386; Lord of the Isles; Chief of Clan Donald
John Mór Tanister MacDonald d. 1427; 1st of Dunnyveg; Founder of Clan MacDonald of Dunnyveg	Margery Byset
Donald Balloch MacDonald d. c. 1476; 2nd of Dunnyveg
John Mor MacDonald fl. 1499; 3rd of Dunnyveg
John Cathanach MacDonald d. 1499; 4th of Dunnyveg
Alexander Carragh MacDonnell c. 1480–1538; 5th of Dunnyveg
Sorley Boy MacDonnell c. 1505–1590; Founder of Clan MacDonnell of Antrim	Hugh O'Neill c. 1550–1610; Earl of Tyrone
Viscount Dunluce, 1618; Earl of Antrim, 1620
Randal MacSorley MacDonnell; 1769–1636; 1st Earl of Antrim, etc.	Ellis (Alice) O'Neill; 1583–1665
Marquess of Antrim (1st creation), 1645
Randal MacSorley MacDonnell; 1609–1682; Marquess of Antrim, 2nd Earl of Antrim, etc.	Alexander MacDonnell; 1615–1699; 3rd Earl of Antrim, etc.
Marquessate of Antrim extinct, 1682
Randal MacDonnell; 1680–1721; 4th Earl of Antrim, etc.
Earl of Antrim (2nd creation) and Viscount Dunluce (2nd creation), 1785; Marquess of Antrim (2nd creation), 1789
Randal William MacDonnell; 1749–1791; Marquess of Antrim, 5th Earl of Antrim, etc., 1st Earl of Antrim, etc.	William Kerr; 1737–1815; Marquess of Lothian
Marquessate of Antrim (2nd creation), Earldom of Antrim (1st creation), and Viscountcy Dunluce (1st creation) extinct, 1721
Henry Vane-Tempest; 1771–1813; 2nd Baronet	Anne Catherine MacDonnell; 1775–1834; 2nd Countess of Antrim, etc.	Charlotte Kerr; 1779–1835; 3rd Countess of Antrim, etc.	Mark Kerr; 1776–1840
Frances Vane; 1800–1865; Marchioness of Londonderry	Hugh Seymour (Kerr) McDonnell; 1812–1855; 4th Earl of Antrim, etc.	Mark (Kerr) McDonnell; 1814–1869; 5th Earl of Antrim, etc.
William Randal McDonnell; 1851–1918; 6th Earl of Antrim, etc.	Louisa Grey; 1855–1945
Randal Mark Kerr McDonnell; 1878–1933; 7th Earl of Antrim, etc.	Angus McDonnell; 1881–1966
Angela Sykes; 1911–1984	Randal John Somerled McDonnell; 1911–1977; 8th Earl of Antrim, etc.
Alexander Randal Mark McDonnell; 1935–2021; 9th Earl of Antrim, etc.	Hector McDonnell b. 1947
Flora McDonnell b. 1963	Randal Alexander McDonnell b. 1967; 10th Earl of Antrim, etc.
Alexander David Somerled McDonnell b. 2006 styled Viscount Dunluce
Heir apparent to the Antrim earldom

== See also ==
- Irish nobility
- Lord of the Isles

== Sources ==
- http://www.clandonald-heritage.com
- MacDonald Family Tree
