= Red Bay Castle =

Castle in Northern Ireland

- north of Glenariff, County Antrim, Northern Ireland
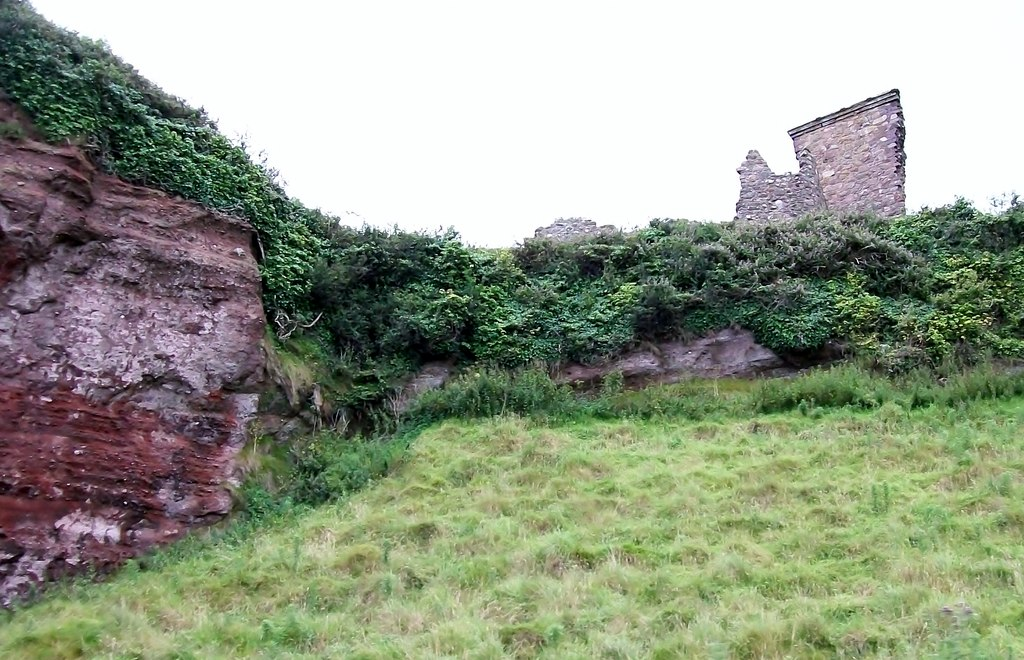
- Castle ruins (2011)

Site information
- Condition: Ruin

Location
- Coordinates: 55.0675°N 6.055833°W

Red Bay Castle (Irish: Caislen Camus Rhuaidh) is situated in County Antrim, Northern Ireland, on a headland projecting into the sea north of Glenariff situated on the road to Cushendall.

== History ==
It was built by the Bissett family in the 13th century on the site of an earlier motte-and-bailey outpost of the Kingdom of Dál Riata. The Bissett family were forfeited of their lands in Scotland and fled for their lives to Ireland after Walter de Bisset was accused of the murder of Patrick, Earl of Atholl, at Haddington, East Lothian in 1242. King Henry III of England granted Bisset large possessions in the Barony of Glenarm, Ireland.

John Mor MacDonald 1st of Dunnyveg married Margery Bissett of the Glens of Antrim, and acquired as a result the castle of Red Bay. His descendants known as the MacDonnells of Antrim extended and rebuilt the castle in the 16th century. In 1565, the castle was burned to the ground by Shane O'Neill, chief of the O'Neills of Tyrone; it was rebuilt by Sorley Boy MacDonnell, however later fell into disrepair.

In 1604 the castle was restored and was later destroyed by Oliver Cromwell in 1652 during the Cromwellian conquest of Ireland.
