= Mac Eoin Bissett family =

Irish family

Mac Eoin Bissett
- Parent house: Bissett family
- Country: Gaelic Ireland
- Founded: 13th century
- Founder: John Byset the Elder
- Titles: MacEoin Bissett; Lord of the Glens; Baron Bissett; Lord of Rathlin
- Dissolution: 16th century

The history of the Bissett family in Ireland can be studied independently from that of the originally identical family in Scotland, because of their unique experience following their arrival in Ulster in the early or mid-13th century. Here, while still remaining involved in Scottish affairs, the Bissetts would establish themselves as the Lords of the Glens of Antrim and quickly become equally, then eventually more involved in the politics of the Irish province, becoming among the most Gaelicised of all the so-called Anglo-Norman families in Ireland. The heads of the leading branch of the family soon adopted the Gaelic lineage style Mac Eoin Bissett (of the Glens), by which they are known in the Irish annals, and which translates as "Son/Descendant of John Byset", after a prominent ancestor born in Scotland. In a number of English and Anglo-Norman sources the same head of the family is referred to as the Baron Bissett, also with variants.

This family style or title eventually split, in a manner, to provide both the modern County Antrim surname Mac Eoin, anglicised McKeon/McKeown, and the surname Bissett itself (in Ireland), the latter not easily distinguishable from the typically Scottish Bisset, for which the doubling of the final -t-, the typical practice in Ireland from the 16th century, has become more common in modern times. In the Irish language Bissett is usually written Bised (Biseid).

== From Scotland to Ulster ==
Precisely when John Byset arrived with his family from Scotland is unknown, but he appears in the (surviving) English documents relating to Ireland in 1245, when Henry III of England orders 50 marks to be given out of the treasury to him as a gift. Byset's activities from then on can only be guessed from the short description of his career in Ireland offered by the terse Annals of Ulster, reporting his death twelve years later in 1257. This entry at least proves that he had established himself prominently in the region with fire and sword:

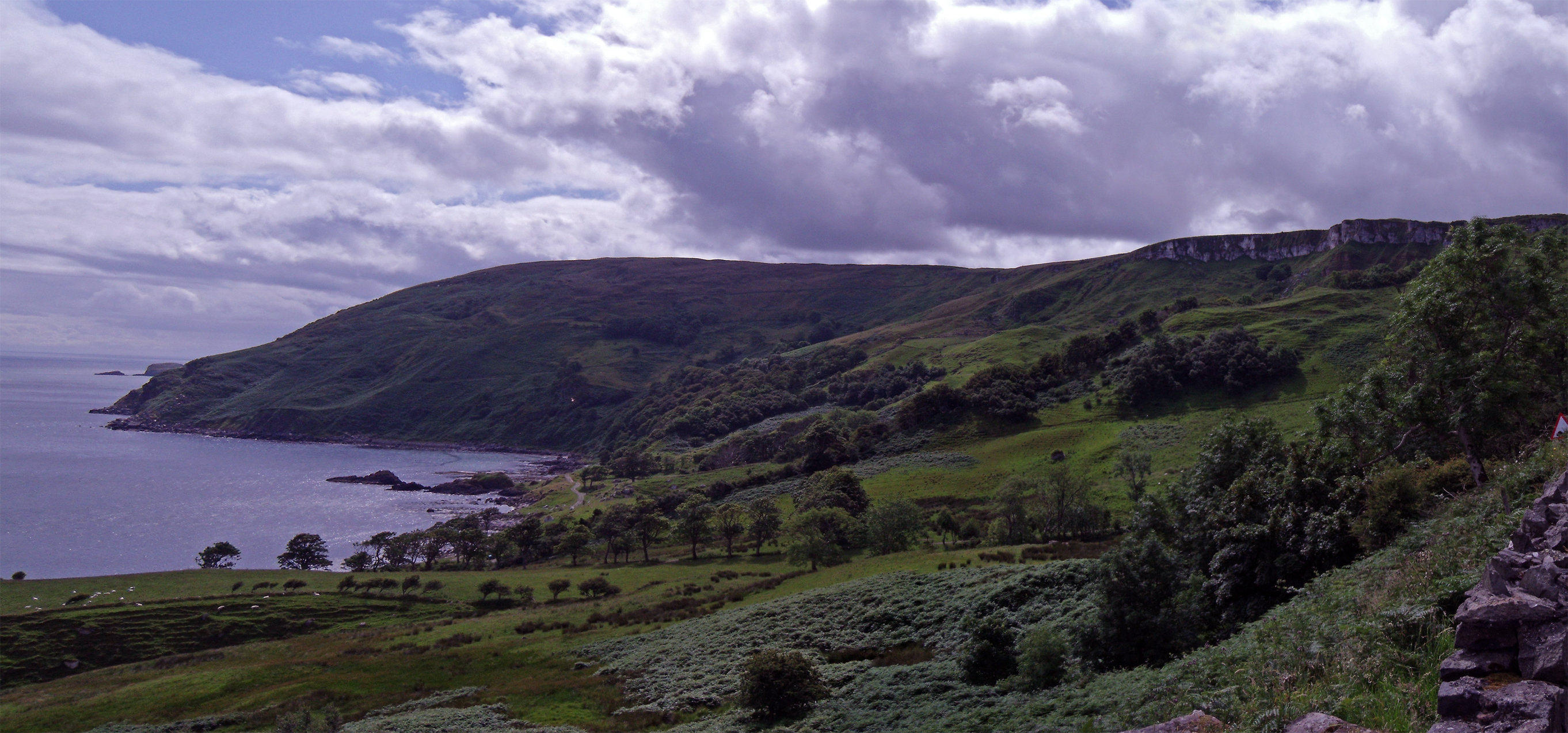
Murlough Bay, exemplary of the rugged coastal lordship of the Bissetts

AU1257.1(col. 2): John Bisset, destroyer of churches and of Gaidhil, perished by the sudden death.

The Gaidhil in this context are the Gaelic Irish of Ulster and perhaps beyond. Whether he purchased his lands himself (one tradition) or was granted them by the English Crown (another) is also unknown, and his relationship with the leading English and other Scottish magnates of the region was probably complex. The first Earl of Ulster (1st creation), Hugh de Lacy, was dead by 1242/3 and his authority, namely the Earldom of Ulster, over the eastern quarter of the modern province of Ulster, this region being then called Ulidia, was incomplete. It is possible that the Bissetts aided de Lacy against his Scottish rival Donnchad, Earl of Carrick and received some of the latter's lands for their assistance, but while attractive no account of such a thing is preserved. Following de Lacy's death, Brian Ua Néill rose to become the most powerful king in all the north of Ireland and in the 1250s was busy smashing the young earldom to pieces, killing many of the English (presumably Scots also) and destroying their castles, and the Bissetts may have been among the sufferers. However, the report of John Byset's death in 1257 shows that the family were viable and may have found themselves possibly even the most prominent British family remaining in Ulidia for a period, since no others are mentioned in the annals. O'Neill was elected High King of Ireland in 1258 by the O'Conors and O'Briens but his death only two years later in the Battle of Druim Dearg came too soon for a major Gaelic overlordship to be established and Walter de Burgh, the Lord of Connacht, was created Earl of Ulster four years after the conflict to preserve England's interests there. Possibly the Bissetts were forced to become his subordinates, but it has been argued that theirs was understood to be, in any case, a palatine lordship from its creation, whenever that may have been.

== Bruce Wars ==
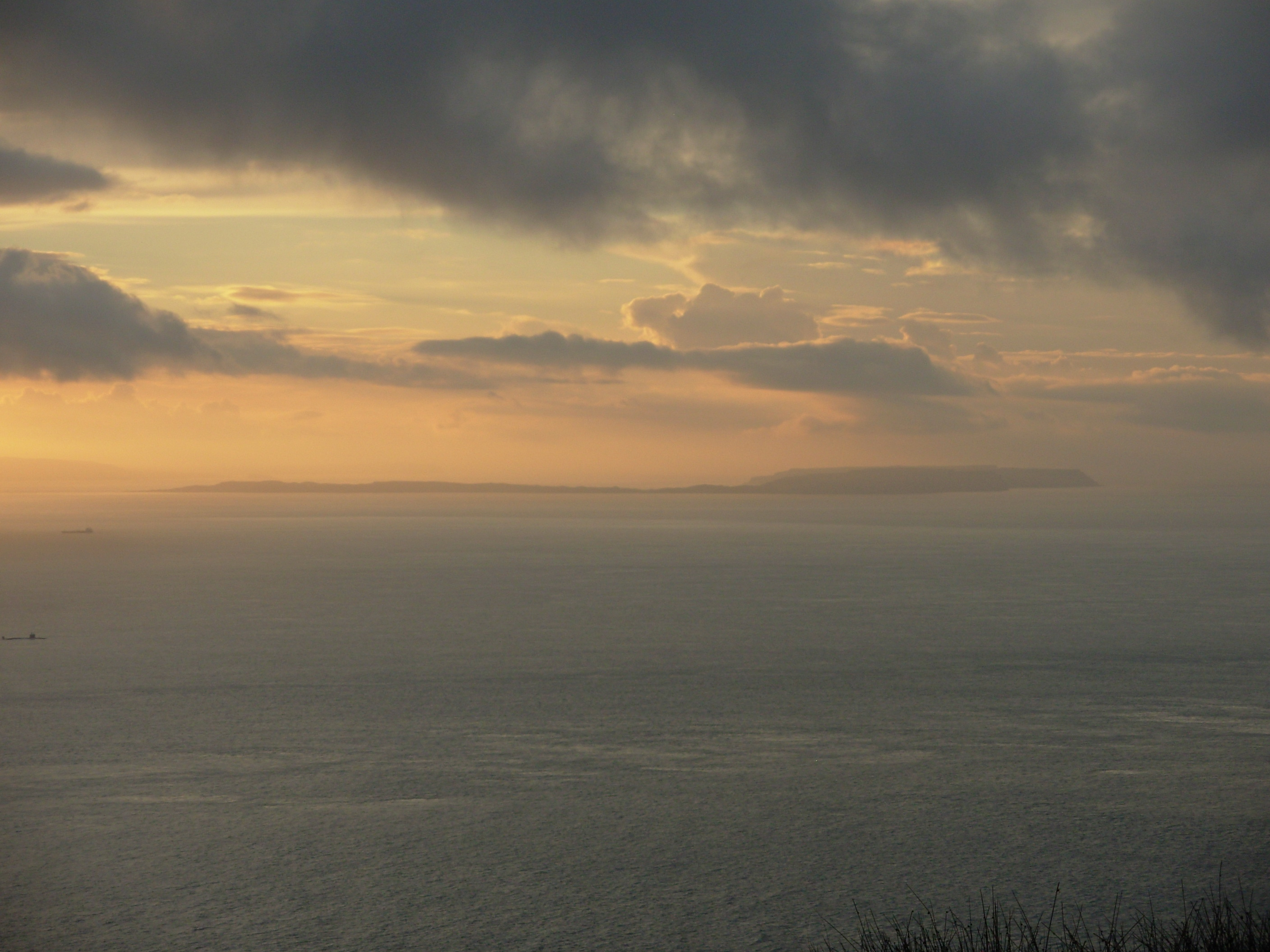
Rathlin Island from the Mull of Kintyre

The historian Archie Duncan has suggested that Edward Bruce may have spent some time as a youth with the Bissetts, and it was to Rathlin Castle that Robert the Bruce and his followers retired in 1305/6 after suffering losses in Scotland. Despite the decrees of Edward I of England, they were reportedly welcomed by the owner Sir Hugh Byset, usually presumed to be a son of the Mac Eoin, and at this time Rathlin Island belonged to the Lordship of the Glens. It was also here that Robert Bruce may have begun planning to re-conquer Scotland, and later Sir Hugh's manor of Glenarm is where his brother Edward arrived after their victory in the Battle of Bannockburn. Parliament sent summonses to a total of five Byset magnates when hearing news of the invasion, their names being John, Hubert, William, and two named Hugh, one presumably Sir Hugh Byset, and the John Byset possibly being the Mac Eoin gone into rebellion to fight on the side of the Scots (for whom see below). The 19th century scholar Herbert Hore suggested the Bysets may actually have inspired Edward Bruce to later invade Ireland.

Since no pedigree of the Irish Bissetts survives, precise relationships can only be guessed and the politics in and of the lordship are unclear. However, Hugh Byset was among the most prominent magnates in the greater region because Aonghus Óg of Islay mentions him in a 1301 letter to Edward I as his compatriot, the pair "awaiting the royal commands." MacDonald's personal loyalty in practice to the English king is uncertain, perhaps complicating the matter, but Byset's is much more clearly established, because he is recorded a number of times, from the late 1290s, in the Anglo-Norman documents, being commanded to fight against the English king's enemies in Scotland, most notably Robert Bruce, the treasury (Crown) paying Byset's expenses for mustering his forces and equipping fleets to go against the Scots, and also sending supplies.

When Edward Bruce invaded Ireland in 1315, Hugh Byset and the heads of several other families, Norman and Gaelic, joined Sir Thomas de Mandeville in opposing him. In fact where Bruce landed, Olderfleet Castle, was quite possibly owned by the Bissett family, but no account is preserved of what if anything this may, if true, have had to do with strategic decisions made by either side. In any event, their mixed Norman-Irish force, importantly lacking the immediate support of the otherwise occupied Earl of Ulster, Richard Óg de Burgh (who was mustering an army from his domains in Connacht), was defeated by one led by Thomas Randolph, Earl of Moray, and the Scottish army then proceeded south to Carrickfergus. The engagement is recalled by John Barbour, who greatly exaggerates the size of the Irish army to be defeated, in his famous epic poem The Brus:

In twa battelis [two battles] thai [Bruce's army] tuk the way
Toward Cragfergus, it to se.
Bot the lordis of that cuntre [country],
Mavndwell, Byset, and Logane,
Thar men assemblit euirilkane [assembled every one of their men];
De Sawagiss wes alsua thair.
And, quhen [when] thai all assemblit war,
Thai war weill neir tuenty thousand.

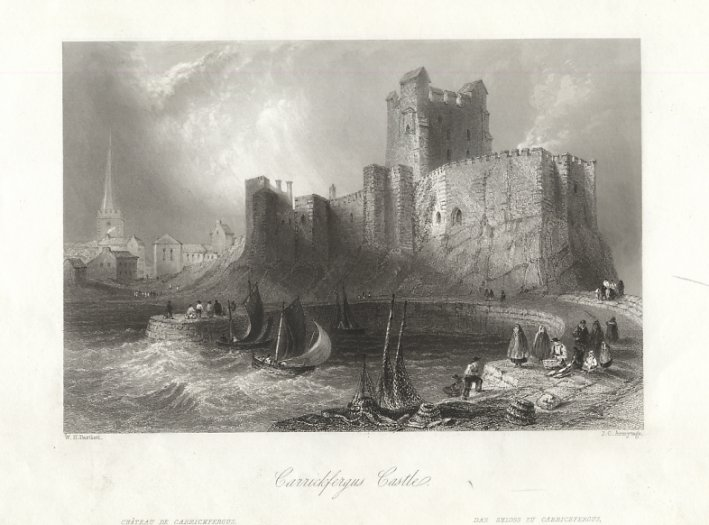
A drawing of Carrickfergus Castle, built in 1177 by John de Courcy

There were, however, members of the family on both sides. A Johannes Bisset, who may very well have been the Mac Eoin gone to Scotland in rebellion and now returning, is listed in Pembridge's Annals and Grace's Annals, both Latin compilations, as one of the eight Scottish lords accompanying Bruce in the invasion of Ulster. According to these Johannes/John Bisset was a leader in the force defeating de Mandeville and his kinsman Hugh Byset, Logan and the Savages above, was evidently with the Scots when later opposed by the armies of Richard Óg de Burgh and Edmund Butler, and was still with Bruce when victorious against Roger Mortimer in the Battle of Kells. Bisset then appears to have died in February the next year (1316), the cause and exact date now unknown.

Hugh Byset was still active fighting for the other side. On All Saints' Day (1 November, the Irish Samhain) in 1316 John Logan and he inflicted a defeat on an army of Scots, killing one hundred in heavy armour and two hundred in regular. In The Brus, John Barbour reports the Bissetts, presumably led by Sir Hugh, again with de Mandeville, Logan, the Savages, altogether with the de Clares, FitzGeralds, Butlers and others, in an alliance defeated by Bruce's army, but the account is confused, location unspecified, and receives no support from the annals and other reliable sources, making it unlikely to have occurred as reported by the poet if such an encounter took place at all.

Despite his support of the English Crown Hugh Byset's lands, Glenarm and Rathlin Island, were declared forfeit by the same government. Why is uncertain, but a (perhaps confused) report made to Edward II in September 1315 that "Bisset-men and Logans" had aided Bruce's arrival may have contributed, as might any report of his earlier welcome of Robert Bruce to Rathlin, and the role in the conflict of Sir Hugh's relation John. Whether anything was carried out is unknown, and in any event the collapse of the Earldom of Ulster less than two decades later in 1333 was the beginning of the end of direct English authority in the region for a long period, leaving the Bissetts surrounded by several increasingly influential Gaelic powers. But five years later in 1338 the situation remained uncertain, and to Byset's aid came his powerful friend John of Islay, the Lord of the Isles, who in May of that year petitioned Edward III to restore to Byset certain lands in "Glynarvie" which had come into the king's possession from the forfeiture of Richard de Mandeville, with Edward III agreeing to grant them to Byset, taking into account either his or John of Islay's previous service in driving out the Crown's enemies (the language of the document leaving it unclear which). Notably John of Islay describes Sir Hugh as his kinsman, as he also may be described less than two weeks later at the beginning of June, when the Crown grants a certain "John Byset of Rachryn" protection out of regard for his kinsman the Lord of the Isles.

== Mac Eoin and the O'Neills ==
The first certain contact of the Bissetts with the O'Neill dynasty is recorded in 1287, when Richard Óg de Burgh involved the short-lived Earldom of Ulster, to which the Bissetts still belonged at this time, in an O'Neill succession dispute. But since this is also the earliest known occurrence of the Gaelic lineage or princely style Mac Eoin, only a few decades after the arrival of the family in Ulster, the Bissetts have already culturally assimilated to a notable degree:

AU1287.2: A host was led by Richard de Burgh namely by the Earl of Ulster (that is, the Red Earl) into Tir-Eogain, whereby he deposed Domnall, son of Brian Ua Neill and Niall Culanach O'Neill was made king by him. And when the Earl left the country, Niall Culanach was killed by Domnall Ua Neill. And the son of Aedh Ua Neill the Tawny (namely, Brian, son of Aedh the Tawny) was made king, with the assent of the same Earl, by Mac Martin and by Mac Eoin. And Domnall left the country.

There are no surviving mentions of the Mac Eoin Bissetts in the Irish sources for nearly another century. The Earldom of Ulster, already weakened by the Bruce invasion, collapsed following the assassination of William Donn de Burgh in 1333. It is unknown what role the Bissetts might have played in this, but half a century later in 1383 they are found probably allied with the O'Neills against the remnants of the earldom, which were led by the Savage family. In that year Niall Mór Ó Néill, King of Ulster launched a massive assault against the remaining English in the north of Ireland, burning their towns and laying waste their territories, and following one engagement Seinicin Finn Bissett, a son of the Mac Eoin, is found dispatching the wounded Raibilin Savage, opponent of Aodh Óg Ó Néill in the battle. Bissett is himself slain by Savage's people in revenge for this.

That the Bissetts were now formally allied to the O'Neills may be supported by several notices in 1387 of the death of one Sabia O'Neill (Sadhbh inghen Aodha Uí Néill), wife of the Mac Eoin Bissett, in which she is praised as "the choice woman of the descendants of Niall of the Nine Hostages in her time" and "a lady that far surpassed all the ladies of the Clanna Neill, in all good parts requisite for the character of a noble matron". All entries describe her as the daughter of one Aodh Ó Néill but who this might be is uncertain. The 19th century genealogist John O'Hart preserved the tradition that Aodh Reamhar Ó Néill, King of Ulster and King of Tyrone (died 1364), also called Aodh Mór, and the father Niall Mór above, also had four daughters but does not give their names nor whom they married.

Further evidence of Bissett support for the Ulster Gaels against the English has possibly been found. A certain "MacGion" reported on the Gaelic side in a conflict in 1403 is suggested by the historian Kenneth Nicholls to be "none other than [the] Mac Eoin Bisset".

== Englyshe rebelles ==
The following belongs to a section of the preliminary list created in 1515, before the Tudor conquest of Ireland, for Henry VIII of England of the leading families of Ireland, both of Gaelic and other lineage, who were not under English control. These were the strongest families of whom his officials had knowledge. First the Gaelic families are listed, and then the Norman families who have gone Gaelic:

... Also, ther is more than 30 greate captaines of thEnglyshe [Anglo-Norman] noble folke, that folowyth the same Iryshe ordre, and kepeith the same rule, and every of them makeith warre and pease for hymself, without any lycence of the King, or of any other temperall person, saive to hym that is strongeyst, and of suche that maye subdue them by the swerde. Ther names folowyth immedyat: (They are listed by Irish province. Reaching Ulster, the Bissetts are one of the only three listed.) ... Here folowyth the names of the great Englyshe rebelles of Wolster. Syr Rowland Savage, of Lecchahyll, Knight. Fitzhowlyn, of Tuscarde. Fitz John Byssede, of the Glynnes.

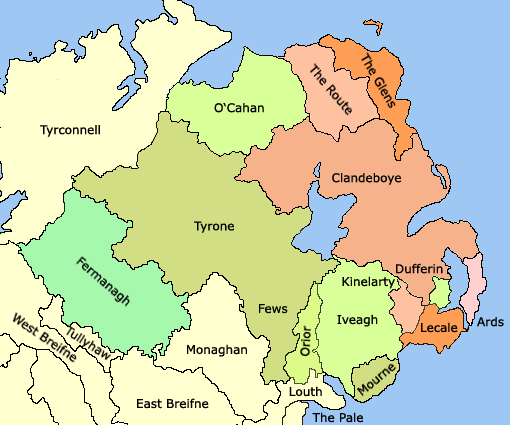
Early 16th century Ulster

Later on in the same document Ulster is discussed again. This time there are four Anglo-Norman families mentioned:

... Hereafter folowyth the names of the thEnglyshe rebelles, dwelleing within the sayd countye of Wolster. Syr Roland Savage, and his kynnesmen. The Baron Russell, and his kynnesmen. Fytzjohn, Lorde of Glynnes, and his kynnesmen. Fythhowlyn, Lord of Tuscarde, and his kynnesmen. Also, that the Deputye, and the sayd captayne, Sir Rowland Savage, and his kennesmen in the baronye of Mawlyn, and in all the landes marcheing with the sayd baronye of Tuscard, and with the baroyne of the Glynnes, and to ayde and succourre them.

A similar list, of contemporary or slightly later date, made itself into the circa 1540 compilation known as the Book of Howth. The editors of the manuscript note that the list is in a different hand from the surrounding text:

... Those English noble and worshipful captains was degenerate from the English laws: (again they are listed by province) ... Wlster: Savadge of Lekayle, Knight, FitzOwlyn of Twskard, Bysetes of the Glyns.

The reference in both to Captains is very important. This was the English term for those families who enjoyed effectively total sovereignty within their territories, even if these might not be extensive. In describing the Gaelic Captains in the beginning of the first document, the officials report that "... some callyth themselffes Kynges, some Kynges Peyres, in their langage, some Prynceis (Flatha), some Dukes, some Archedukes... and obeyeth to no other temperall person... and hath imperiall jurysdyction in his rome [realm]..." Gaelic Ireland is described as a patchwork of various overkingdoms, petty kingdoms, and other territories with limited to no national overlordship, although some might be practised at the provincial level, for example by the O'Neills in the case of Ulster. The Bissetts and these other "English" families were those who had become like the Gaelic Irish, adopting their concepts of sovereignty, manners and styles. This was sometimes referred to as becoming more Irish than the Irish themselves, although the extent of Gaelicization varied by family. Some families were later brought back, and others not. We never get to find out in the case of the Bissetts because they have apparently gone under by the time the Kingdom of Ireland is proclaimed and Henry begins receiving the submission of the princes.

== Lordship lost ==
The Battle of Knockavoe in 1522 as described in the Annals of Connacht:

AC1522.7: ... But as for O Domnaill and the Cenel Conaill, since they had not warriors enough or a force to give battle to either of those two armies, he and his nobles determined to make a night attack on O Neill and his host. They dismounted their horsemen and added them to their battalions [of foot] and, O Neill being encamped at Knockavoe, the Cenel Conaill attacked them of one accord, without help of neighbour or friend. O Neill was defeated that night and many of his followers, both Scotch and Irish, were killed, more especially the Galls and the Leinster gallowglasses. Mac Eoin of the Glens and many other Scots and a great number of the Clann Domnaill Galloclaech and of the Clann Sithig were killed there, and O Neill went away as a defeated man after the slaughter of his followers.

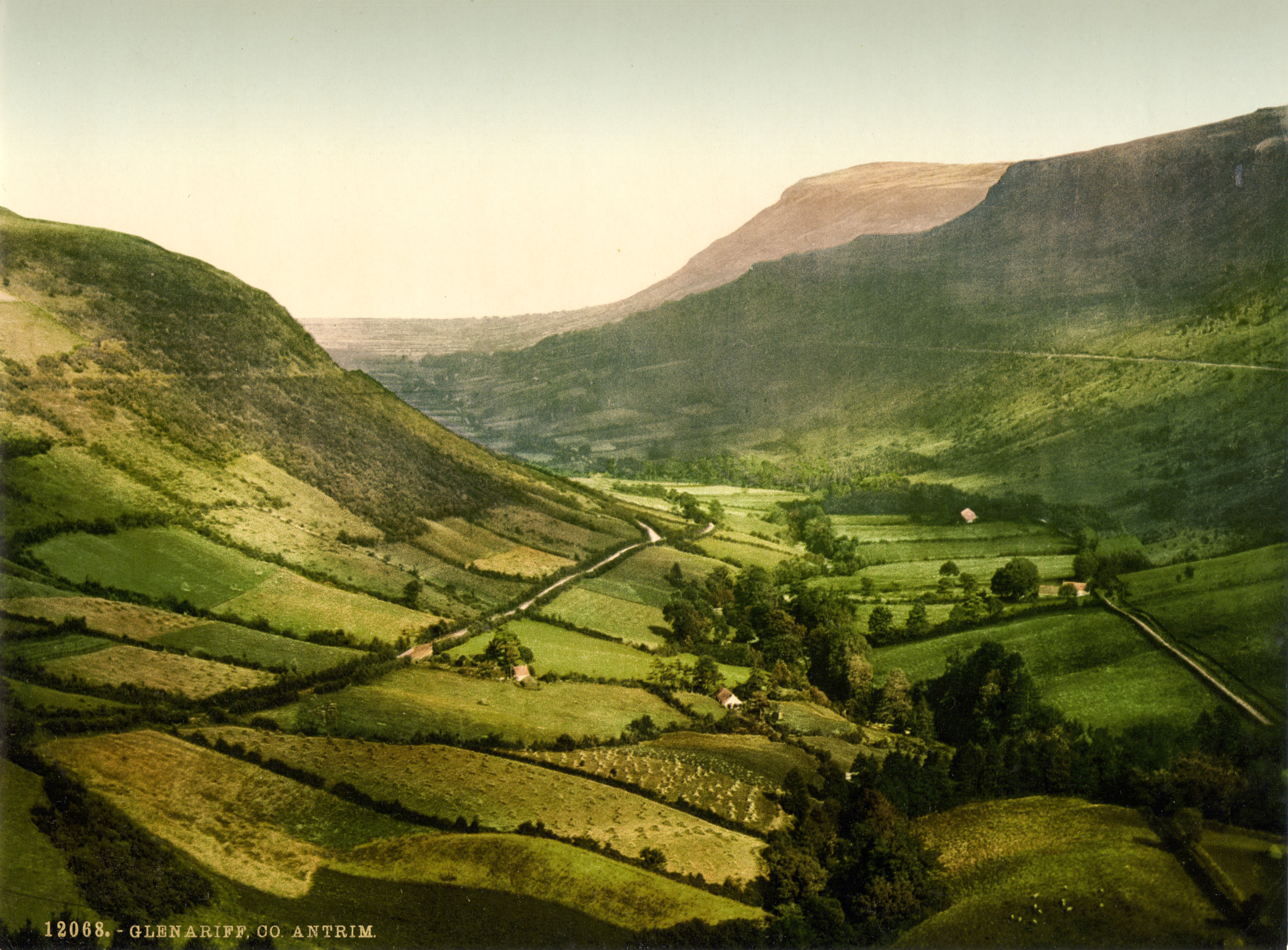
Glenariff, the 'Queen of the Glens'

Above is the final report of an activity of the Mac Eoin Bissett family in the Irish and English sources, and it is assumed that not long after, the MacDonnells, newly of Antrim and the former friends and allies of the Bissetts, somehow managed to dispossess them of the Lordship of the Glens.

Only ten years previously the Bissett lordship was weakened by the invasion of Gerald Mór FitzGerald into the region, who after entering the O'Neill Clandeboye lordship and taking the castle of Belfast marched through into Bissett territory, where he destroyed the Mac Eoin's castle and plundered much of the Glens and surrounding countryside. This misfortune was itself preceded by another, although not of the same magnitude, in 1495, when the O'Donnells of Tyrconnell to the west, the leading rivals of the O'Neills, made a small stealthy raid on the Mac Eoin's personal estates, and according to the Annals of the Four Masters succeeded in capturing him, his praiseworthy wife, steeds and hound, who were all considered to be the finest in the area, as well as an amount of his personal fortune. This not always completely reliable compilation, being the work of biased Tyrconnell scholars, claims this was caused by the Mac Eoin's refusal to give up his fine steed to Conn O'Donnell after it has been requested. The actual extent of the damage is uncertain and the event is reported in no other source. In the annals it is clear that FitzGerald's invasion seventeen years later involved far greater forces.

=== Margery Byset and the MacDonnells ===
The MacDonnell claim to the Glens of Antrim dated from the marriage of Margery Byset, a daughter of the Mac Eoin, to John Mór MacDonnell, the second son of John of Islay, Lord of the Isles, in the 1390s. From the date of this marriage, or soon after, he and their descendants, the Clan MacDonald of Dunnyveg, considered the Lordship of the Glens to be theirs and styled themselves lords of "Dunnyveg and the Glens", first found being styled so in a document dating to 1403. However the male line of the Bissetts was certainly "far from extinct," and whatever gains made by the MacDonnells are uncertain. Bissett hostility to the MacDonnells may in fact have produced an alliance between the latter and the Savage family, and the war-making, on the side of the Ulster Gaels, against the English of Ulster, including the Savages, by a certain MacGion, likely the Mac Eoin Bissett, in 1403 may be associated with MacDonnell's new style as recognised by Henry IV. Also notable is that a member of the Savage family, the seneschal of Ulster Richard Savage, had the wardship of Margery, as well as her sister Elizabeth, following the late Mac Eoin's death, and this included some control over whatever for certain their actual inheritances may have been, but it is unknown what exactly this may have had to do with the marriage to MacDonnell or if any possible alliance may have been influential.

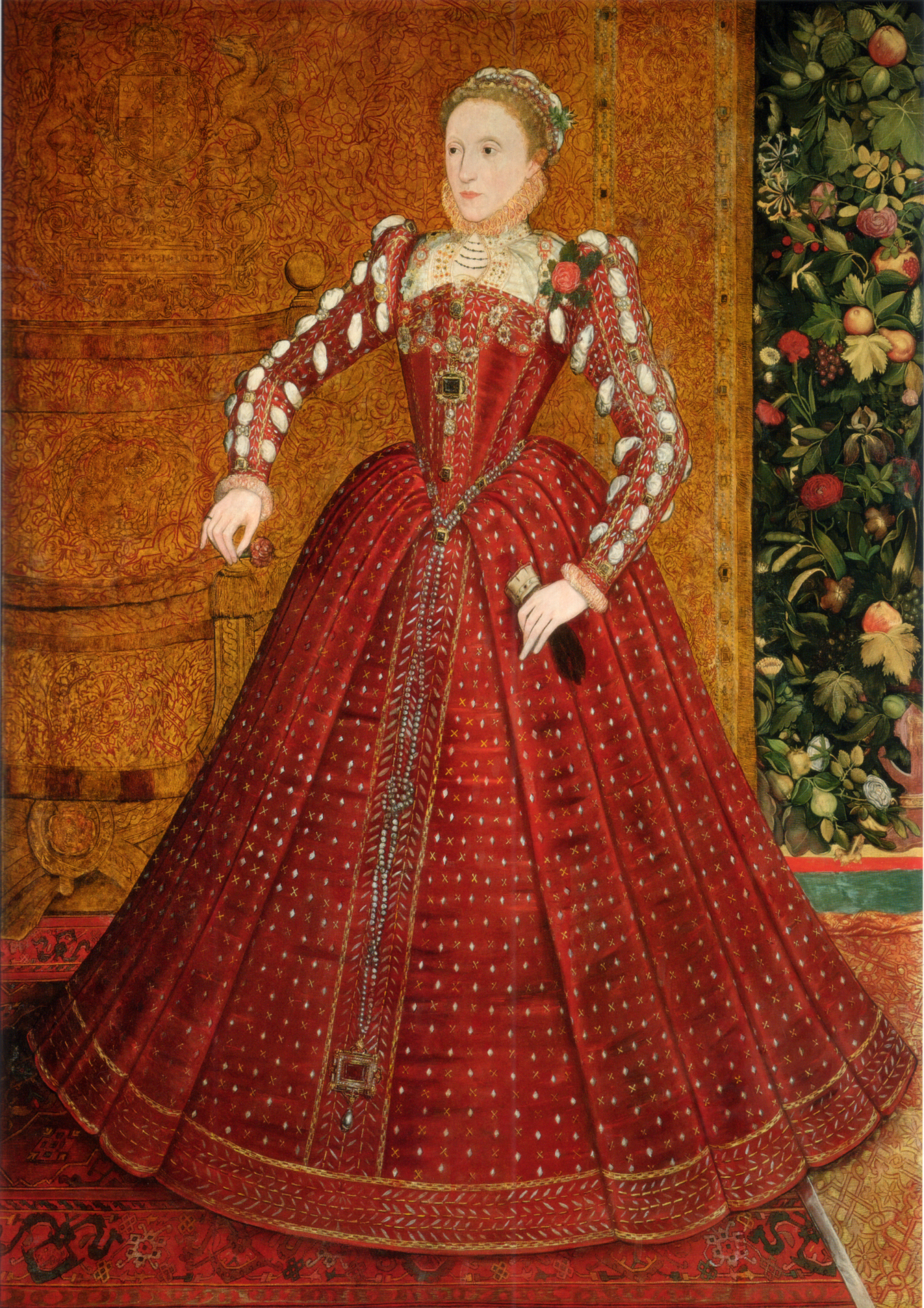
The "Hampden" portrait of Elizabeth I, by Steven van der Meulen, c. 1563

In the opinion of W. F. T. Butler the MacDonnell claim was of doubtful legality, while according to George Hill they did not establish a permanent (or any) presence in the Glens until Alexander Carragh in the early 16th century, who is noticed campaigning in the Irish annals in the 1520s. He was a strong leader with a large following, and it is in this decade the Bissetts appear to lose control of their lordship following the Battle of Knockavoe. One of Alexander Carragh's sons, the celebrated Sorley Boy, was finally allowed by Elizabeth I in 1560 to be a tenant of the lands he claimed "by inheritance," but the MacDonnells continued to struggle to gain a foothold because of Ulster's leading prince, Shane O'Neill, who continually harassed them. In 1573, six years after O'Neill's death, Sorley Boy (re-)petitioned, and this time for "a portion of the Glynns claimed by him by inheritance from the M[B]issetts", with the government thinking it a good idea to grant because they could use him against the Irish who were still refusing to submit. However, he himself soon became involved in a major conflict with the English, and ended up settling in The Route, the old MacQuillan lordship to the west of the Glens, while a younger brother, Donnell Gorme MacDonnell, swore fealty to Elizabeth in 1584 for "so much of the Glynns in Ulster as were the lands of Myssett, otherwise Bissett", agreeing to pay what yearly rents the Lord Deputy Henry Sidney decided, this being 60 beeves (cattle). Uncertain is the actual extent of the territory being granted at this moment and the size of the lordship certainly varied over time. But less than two years later, and shortly before Elizabeth and James VI of Scotland agreed in the 1586 Treaty of Berwick that the MacDonnells would finally have the right to stay in Ireland, the Lord Deputy granted the lordship, the yearly rents again being 60 beeves, to Angus MacDonnell of Dunnyveg, another relative of Sorley Boy, with all its castles and "Myssett alias Byssett's lands" save Olderfleet Castle (by this time of uncertain origin to the parties involved), this to become the property of the Queen.

=== 1586 description ===
This same year Sir Henry Bagenal, in his Description and Present State of Ulster, describes the Glynns as they were understood then as being:

... so called because it is [they are] full of rockie and woodie dalles [dales], it [they] stretchethe in lengthe 24 miles (on the one side beinge backed with a very steepe and bogie [boggy] mounteyne and on th' other parte with the sea) on whiche side there are many small creekes betwene rockes and thickets, where the Scottish gallies [galleys] do commonlie land; at either end are very narrowe entries and passages into this countrey, which lieth directlie opposite to Cantire in Scotland, from which it is 18 miles distant.

The Glynns contain seven baronies, these being Larn, Park, Glenarm (the seat of the lordship), Redbaye, Lade, Cary, and Mowbray, with Rathlin Island counted as an additional half barony, and they were understood to be:

... some tyme th' enheritance of the Baron Myssett, from whom it discended to a daughter who was married to one of the Clandonells in Scotland, by whom the Scotts now make their clayme to the whole, and did quietlie possesse the same for many yeares, till now of late (beinge spoyled of their goodes), they were totalie banished into Scotland...

Uncertain is whether Irish and English attempts to drive out the MacDonnells in the 16th century are meant, or if their "quiet possession" of the territory refers to the period of over a century before this when the lordship or most of it remained in the possession of the Bissett family.

=== Alternative view ===
In the minority is the scholar Simon Kingston, who has recently argued, using an absence of evidence is not evidence of absence approach, that the MacDonnells did in fact gain the upper hand to become dominant in the Glens following the marriage of Margery Byset to John Mór MacDonnell. His approach disregards the lack of a MacDonnell presence in the Irish sources and English ones covering Irish affairs in favour of assuming the accuracy of the MacDonnell claims and styles prior to the 1520s. What is unknown is whether the Bissetts ever recognised the nominal overlordship of the much more powerful Scottish dynasty still based in the Western Isles, a different species of submission from giving up their lordship itself. If so then the MacDonnell claims could be understood differently, but remain unverifiable. Kenneth Nicholls finds Bissett acceptance of the MacDonnell intrusion unlikely and military retaliation probable.

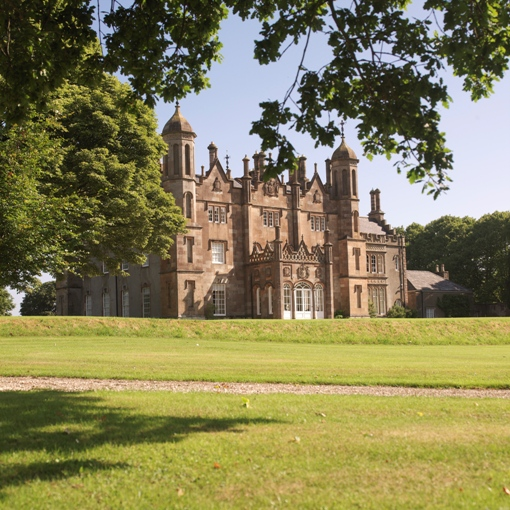
Glenarm Castle, near the site of the old Bissett manor of Glenarm

=== Earldom of Antrim ===
The MacDonnells were still pressing their claim based on their "inheritance" and descent from Margery and the Baron (Mac Eoin) Bissett into the 17th century. After Randal MacDonnell, a son of Sorley Boy, received a grant for both the Glynns and the Route in 1603, he was created Viscount Dunluce in 1618 and soon after that 1st Earl of Antrim in 1620. In the 11th year of Elizabeth's reign an Act of Parliament officially vested the "Baron Bissett's land" in the Crown of England, and in 1617–8 the MacDonnells' claim to it as "heirs unto Bissett" remained of importance, with the new Viscount Dunluce's pedigree even provided for the record:

... Eoin More or Eoin the Great, whose mother was Margaret Stuard, daughter to Robert King of Scotland, and whose wife was Mary Bised that was heir of the seven troohes of Glinnes, whereof Rachroin was parcel. This Donell Ballagh died seized of the seven troohes or cantreds of the Glinnes, in the year 1476, & c.

Domhnall Ballach, the son of John Mór and Margery, spent some time under the protection of the O'Neills in Ireland after fleeing Scotland following conflicts with James I, but he returned to his seat on Islay in 1437 and is not recorded in possession of any part of the Glens from that time or at his death in 1476 in contemporary Irish or English sources. His son John Mor (II) MacDonnell (executed 1499), the 3rd Lord of Dunnyveg, also lived his life in Scotland, but his son was the Alexander Carragh already discussed, evidently responsible for completely ousting the Bissetts in the Glens in the 1520s or not long after.

=== Descendants ===
The Earldom of Antrim, although much reduced, still exists today and in the possession of descendants, the Earls of Antrim and Viscounts Dunluce, of the Lady Margery and the Mac Eoin Bissetts. Their Gaelic title has also been revived in a fashion recently by another MacDonnell descendant, who styles himself MacDonnell of the Glens and received recognition from the Irish government (until courtesy recognition of Chiefs of the Name was ceased in 2003).

A certain ghost by the name of Ann Bissett was in the 19th century and may still be known to inhabit Glenarm Castle and its grounds, where she will not appear to MacDonnells, only to others, because of the bitter later history of their families.

== A Greek family? ==
While a pedigree of the Irish Bissetts probably does not survive, Duald Mac Firbis, in his Leabhar na nGenealach, tells us in his pedigree of the MacDonnells the following:

Eoin [Mac Donnell], who is also called Eoin a Hile and Eoin Mor, the second son of Eoin, son of Aongus Oge, had to wife Maria Bised, daughter of Mac Eoin Bised, (a Greek family which came in with the conquest of William the Conqueror;) and it was by her that the seven lordships of the Glenns came to the Mac Donnells...

The passage goes on to state incorrectly that the MacDonnells had by 1649 been in possession of the Glens of Antrim for 227 years, but above we are provided with our only surviving mention of what was a tradition current in Ireland some period of time before the mid-17th century. Duald Mac Firbis reported pedigrees and traditions as he found them and so it is not his own speculation. Without offering an opinion on this claim of Greek origins, John O'Donovan wondered if this should really mean (to Scotland with) William the Lion, it being the well known case that the Scottish king brought a number of Norman families with him to Scotland, from 1174, following his captivity in England. In fact the first known Byset in Scotland, Henricus Byset, witnessed a charter by William circa 1198. But this is not of the most importance, as the family are typically classed as Norman in any case, even if their origins beyond that grouping are uncertain. Edmund Chisholm-Batten took the Irish tradition seriously and offered some possibilities, first noting the similarity of the arms of the Byzantine Greek family named Dassiotes to those of the Bissetts. Alternatively, noting an instance of the name being spelled Buset in 1294, he suggests the family name Βυσσητòς, from the word for "fine linen", Βυσσoς.

== See also ==
- Clan Bissett
- Bissett (surname)
