= Alistair Carragh Macdonald =

Alastair Carragh MacDonald (Alexander the Strong) (d. c.1440) was a son of John of Islay, Lord of the Isles and Margaret Stewart, daughter of King Robert II of Scotland and Elizabeth Mure. He is the eponymous ancestor of Clan MacDonald of Keppoch.

He fought alongside his brother, Donald of the Isles, at the Battle of Harlaw in 1411, supporting Donald's claim to the Earldom of Ross. For his involvement in the 1431 insurrection of Donald Balloch and the Battle of Inverlochy, Alistair had a large portion of his lands confiscated, with those lands transferred to the Malcolm Beg Mackintosh, Chief of Clan MacKintosh. However, Alistair never gave up his lands but held them by his sword.

After Alastair Carragh's death in 1440, his fellow clansmen and kinsmen would later identify themselves as the "race of Alastair" for the next 300 years.

== Family ==
By his wife Mary (b. 1365), daughter of Malcolm, Earl of Lennox, they had the following known issue:

- Angus, d. c.1484, married a daughter of MacPhee of Glenpean.
- Alexander MacAlastair, b. 1400, d. 1465
