= Clan MacDonald of Dunnyveg =

Scottish clan

- Motto: Toujours Prêt (Always Prepared)

Profile
- Region: Highlands and Islands
- District: Islay, Kintyre and Antrim
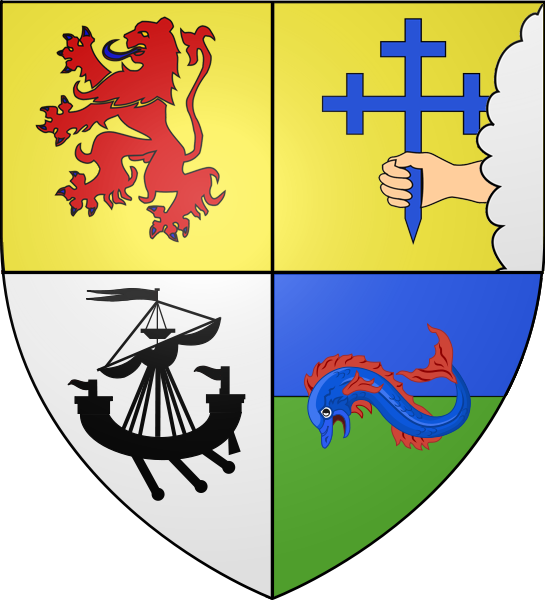
- Clan MacDonald of Dunnyveg no longer has a chief, and is an armigerous clan
- Historic seat: Dunyvaig Castle
Clan branches
Clan MacDonnell of Antrim
Clan MacDonald of Largie
Allied clans
Clan Cameron
Clan MacNeill
Rival clans
Clan MacLean
Clan Campbell of Cawdor

Clan MacDonald of Dunnyveg, also known as Clan Donald South, Clan Iain Mor, Clan MacDonald of Islay and Kintyre, MacDonalds of the Glens (Antrim) and sometimes referred to as MacDonnells, is a Scottish clan and a branch of Clan Donald. The founder of the MacDonalds of Dunnyveg is Eòin Mòr Tànaiste Mac Dhòmhnaill, a son of Iain Mic Dhòmhnaill (John of Islay, Lord of the Isles) and Margaret Stewart of Scotland, daughter of King Robert II. Members of the clan actually pronounced and spelled their name M'Connall due to the Gaelic pronunciation of the name Mac Domhnuill thus giving rise to the surname McConnell and its variants. While historically recognised as a clan by the Court of the Lord Lyon, it is now an armigerous clan as it no longer has a chief. The last chief was Sir James MacDonald, 9th of the Clan MacDonald of Dunnyveg or Clan Donald South, who died in London in 1626.

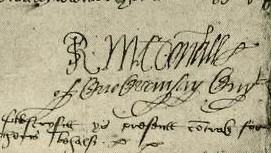
1597 Bond by Sir James "MacDonald" of Knockrinsay signs his signature as M'Connall. He is listed below as Seamus, 9th of Dunnyveg

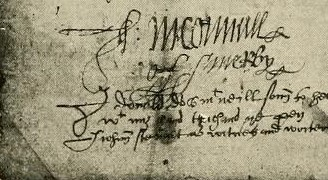
1594 Bond by James "Macdonald" of Smerby, signed as M'Connall

== History ==
=== Origins of the clan ===
The founder of Clan Donald of Dunnyveg and the Glens was Eòin Mòr Tànaiste Mac Dhòmhnaill who was the second son of John MacDonald also known as Good John of Islay, Lord of the Isles, 6th chief of Clan Donald and 1st Lord of the Isles through his marriage to Margaret Stewart. Eòin Mòr Tànaiste Mac Dhòmhnaill married Margaret Bissett of the Glens of Antrim. From his marriage he claimed, but did not possess, this territory in Ireland, along with those he already possessed in Islay and Kintyre in Scotland. He and his descendants became known as Lords of Dunnyvaig and the Glens, although they did not possess the latter until the 16th century. Their seat in Dunnyvaig was on the Island of Islay and in the Glens they were seated at Dunluce Castle on the north Antrim coast.

=== Council of the Isles ===
The Lords of the Isles and the Council of the Isles met on Islay (pronounced Eye’ la) at Finlaggan Gaelic for white hollow. Finlaggan loch has two small islands. Upon the larger was the residence of the Lord of the Isles. The smaller of the isles was called Eilean nan Comhairle, meaning ‘council island’. The Council of the Isles met on the smaller island. The Lordship of the Isles was not governed anything like later feudal Lords governed; It was more like the Celtic kingdoms of Ireland and the Dalriadic Kingdom from which it evolved. Local chiefs elected by their clan made up the Council of the Isles. They acted as judges to settle disputes in their own clan. They were the chiefs of Clan Donald branches Dunnyveg, Clanranald, Keppoch, and Ardnamurchan and the clans of ancient Dalriada including MacKinnon, MacMillan, Magee, MacNicoll, Maceachern, MacKay, and MacGillivray. Several clan chiefs of the MacLeods and MacLeans were on the Council.

=== 15th, 16th and 17th centuries ===
Eòin Mòr Tànaiste was assassinated by James Campbell in 1427 (on the authority of King James I). His son Donald Balloch MacDonald the 2nd chief led Clan Donald at age 18 when they fought and won at the first Battle of Inverlochy (1431). This was in support of their cousin Alexander of Islay, Earl of Ross and chief of Clan Donald, 3rd Lord of the Isles, who was then imprisoned at Tantallon Castle by James I.

The third Chief, Sir John Mor with his heir John Cathanach and three grandsons were apprehended through the treachery of MacIain of Ardnamurchan and were executed in Edinburgh for treason. However, MacIain of Ardnamurchan, who had also betrayed Alexander MacDonald of Lochalsh, was himself killed in 1518 by those whom he had betrayed.

On the death of James MacDonald, 6th of Dunnyveg and Antrim, the Antrim Glens were seized by one of his younger brothers called Somerled or Sorley Boy MacDonnell known also as Sorley Buy. In 1565 under Sorley Boy MacDonnell, Clan Donald of Antrim and Dunnyveg fought the Battle of Glentasie against Shane O'Neill in Ireland. Sorley Buy swore allegiance to James IV of Scotland and his fourth son Ranald was made Randal MacDonnell, 1st Earl of Antrim by Queen Elizabeth.

Much quarreling took place between Angus MacDonald, 8th of Dunnyveg and his eldest son, Sir James MacDonald, 9th of Dunnyveg this was largely due to the intrigues of the Clan Campbell. Sir James MacDonald led the clan who fought and won the Battle of Gruinart Strand on the Isle of Islay in 1598 against an invasion force of the Clan MacLean who were led by Sir Lachlan Mor Maclean of Duart Castle who was killed.

Further intrigue by the Clan Campbell brought the downfall of the Clan Donald of Dunnyveg and by 1620 Sir James MacDonald had lost control of Islay and Kintyre. However, during the Civil War the lands were back in the hands of the MacDonalds briefly when they were supporters of James Graham, 1st Marquess of Montrose. A notable member of the Clan MacDonald of Dunnyveg is Alasdair Mac Colla who is famed for his victories with the Royalist James Graham, 1st Marquess of Montrose during Scottish Civil War of the 1640s.

The last chief, Sir James MacDonald, 9th of the Clan MacDonald of Dunnyveg or Clan Donald South died in London in 1626. This meant that the chiefs of the Clan MacDonald of Dunnyveg and the Glens were extinct and left the MacDonnell, Earls of Antrim as the representatives of their branch of the Clan Donald in Ulster.

==== Baron of Bar ====
Baron of Bar (extinct) was a title of nobility in the Baronage of Scotland for the holder of the barony with its caput baronium at an unknown location in North Kintyre, Scotland. The MacDonalds of Dunnyveg held the barony in the 16th century.

=== 21st century ===
A petition was lodged on 18 May 2012 with The Court of Lord Lyon by John Gerald McDonnell seeking confirmation of the Arms of the Clan Donald South, Clan Ian Mor and a grant of Supporters and Standard befitting the rank of degree of Chief of Ian Mor. The petition was dismissed on 10 November 2014 by Lord Lyon, Dr. Joseph J. Morrow.

== Lords ==
- Eòin Mòr Tànaiste Mac Dhòmhnaill killed 1427
- Dòmhnall Ballach Mac Dhòmhnaill died 1476
- Seán Mór Mac Dhòmhnaill, 3rd of Dunnyveg executed 1499
- Seán Cathanach Mac Dhòmhnaill, 4th of Dunnyveg executed 1499
- Alexander Carragh Mac Dhòmhnaill, 5th of Dunnyveg died 1538
- Séamus Mac Dhòmhnaill, 6th of Dunnyveg died 5 July 1565
- Archibald Mac Dòmhnuill, 7th of Dunnyveg died circa 1569
- Aonghus mac Séamus Mac Dòmhnuill, 8th of Dunnyveg died 21 October 1614
- Sir Séamus Mac Dòmhnuill, 9th of Dunnyveg died 1626

== Castles ==
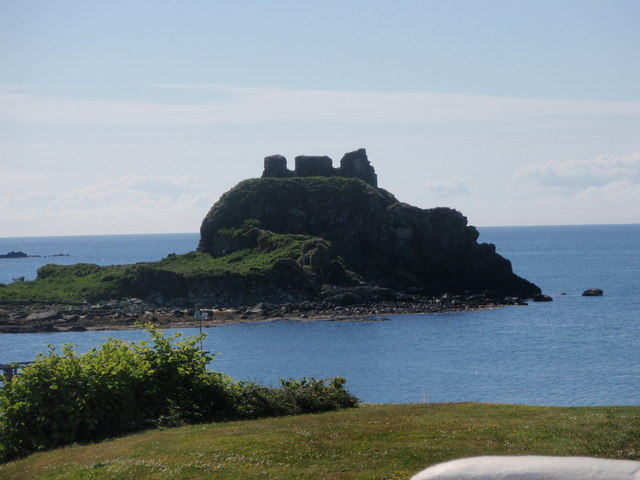
The ruins of Dunyvaig Castle, historic seat of the chiefs of the Clan MacDonald of Dunnyveg

- Dunyvaig Castle, three miles east of Port Ellen on the south of the Isle of Islay was the seat of the chief of the Clan MacDonald of Dunnyveg. There are now only ruins of what was a strong castle. There was a small tower or keep that was surrounded by an inner and outer courtyard. The last MacDonald of Dunnvaig defeated the Clan MacLean at the Battle of Traigh Ghruinneart, but MacDonald was however ordered to surrender the castle and was forfeited in 1608. The castle was then put under the stewardship of the Bishop of the Isles for the king, but Alasdair Colkitto MacDonald retook it in 1612. In 1615 the castle passed to the Clan Campbell of Cawdor and while Alasdair Colkitto MacDonald escaped, many of his men were killed. It was re-taken by Alasdair Colkitto MacDonald in 1647, but after a siege by David Leslie, 1st Lord Newark, the castle was forced to surrender when the water supply failed and Alasdair Colkitto MacDonald was finally hanged from the walls. The castle was held by the Campbells of Cawdor until 1677 and the island remained with branches of the Clan Campbell. The castle has mostly crumbled away but the ruins have been consolidated and can be visited.

== See also ==
- Irish nobility
- Scottish clan
- MacDonnell (surname)
