= Ranald Bane MacDonald, 1st of Largie =

Scottish clansmen

Ranald Bane MacDonald (dates of birth and death unknown, alive in 1431) was the illegitimate son of John Mór Tanister (died 1427) and a daughter of a concubine of Finguine MacKinnon (the Green Abbot). He is the founder of Clan MacDonald of Largie. He was given a charter for lands in Kintyre around Largie, for his services at the Battle of Inverlochy.

== Family ==
He is known to have fathered:

- Donald MacDonald, 2nd of Largie
- Alexander MacDonald, 3rd of Largie
- John MacDonald
- Marion of Cortynvale
