= Olderfleet Castle =

Coordinates: 54.84280°N 5.80080°W

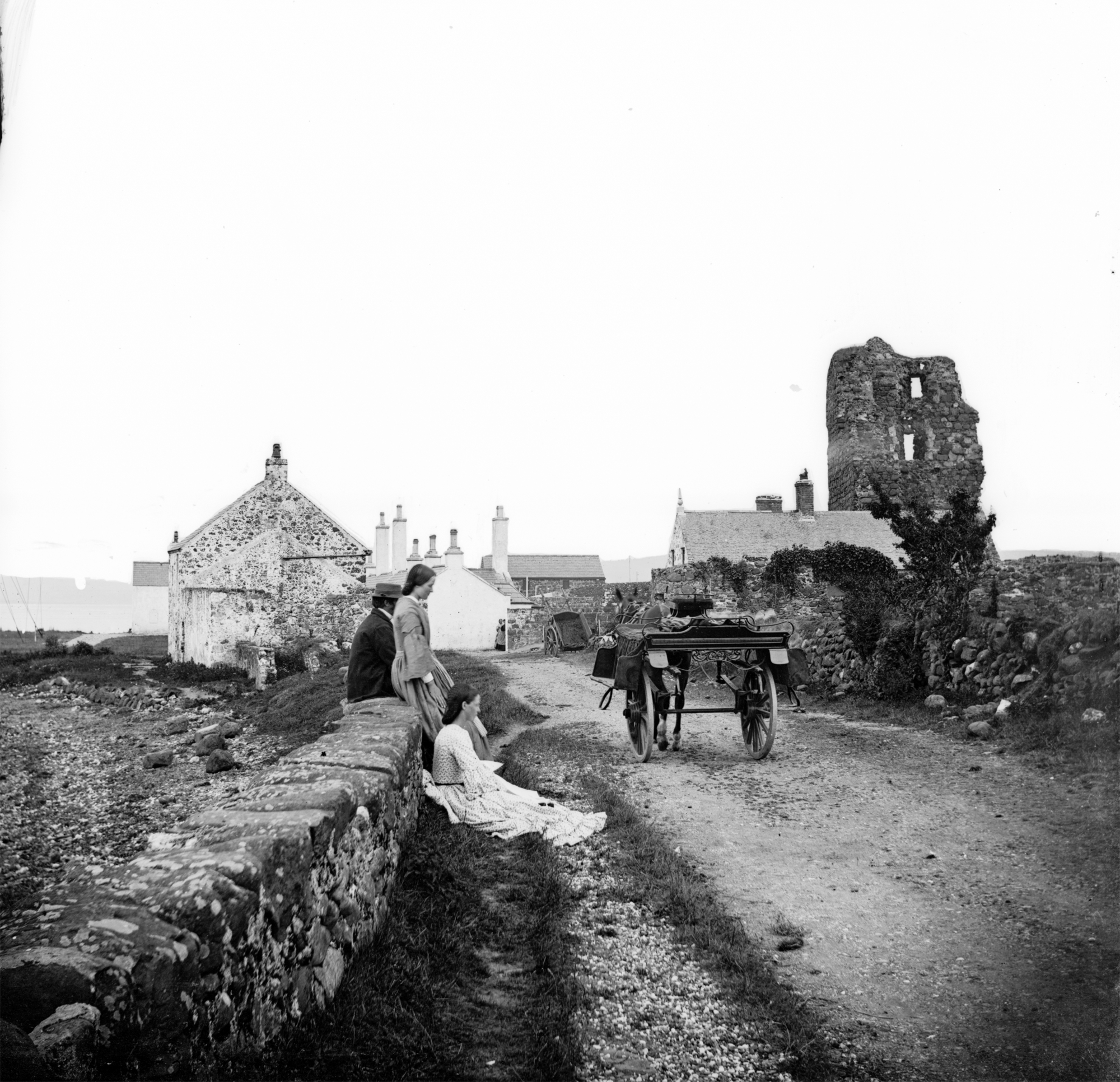
Ruins of what is now known as Olderfleet Castle (circa 1860-1883). This structure may have been originally known as Curran Castle.

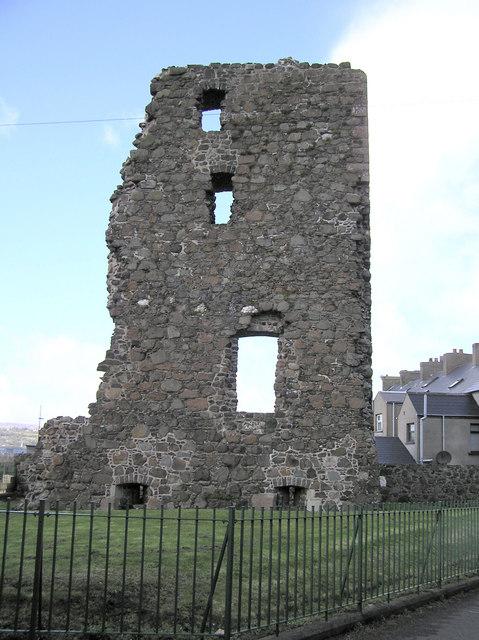
Olderfleet Castle in 2006

Olderfleet Castle is a four-storey towerhouse, the remains of which stand on Curran Point to the south of Larne Harbour in Larne, County Antrim, Northern Ireland. The place name of Olderfleet may be a corruption of Ulfrecksfiord (or Ulfried's Fjord), the Viking name for Larne Lough.

Olderfleet Castle is a State Care Historic Monument in the townland of Curran and Drumaliss, in the former Larne Borough Council area, at grid ref: D4133 0166.

== History ==
The original towerhouse was possibly built by the Scoto-Irish Bissett family of Glenarm around 1250, although these remains are actually thought to be those of Curran Castle, a towerhouse built in the sixteenth century. On a 1610 map it was called Coraine Castle.

In 1315 Edward Bruce landed here with his 6000 strong army en route to conquer Ireland, with a welcome from the Bissetts. Queen Elizabeth I considered the castle of such strategic importance that it was seized for the crown and Sir Moyses Hill appointed its governor in 1569. In 1597 the castle was claimed by the MacDonnells and in 1598 it was dismantled.

The present castle was probably built about 1612. In 1621 it was granted to Sir Arthur Chichester and remained in that family until leased to William Agnew in 1823. James Chaine purchased the lease in 1865. In 1938 it was taken into State Care.

== Features ==
What remains of the four-storey towerhouse is part of the tower with pairs of gun loops in the basement. The square remains show that it only had 1 metre thick walls and it is without visible domestic features, which means that it could have been built as a fortified warehouse and watchtower.

== See also ==
- Castles in Northern Ireland
