= Rathlin Castle =

Castle on Rathlin Island, Northern Ireland

- Rathlin Island, Northern Ireland
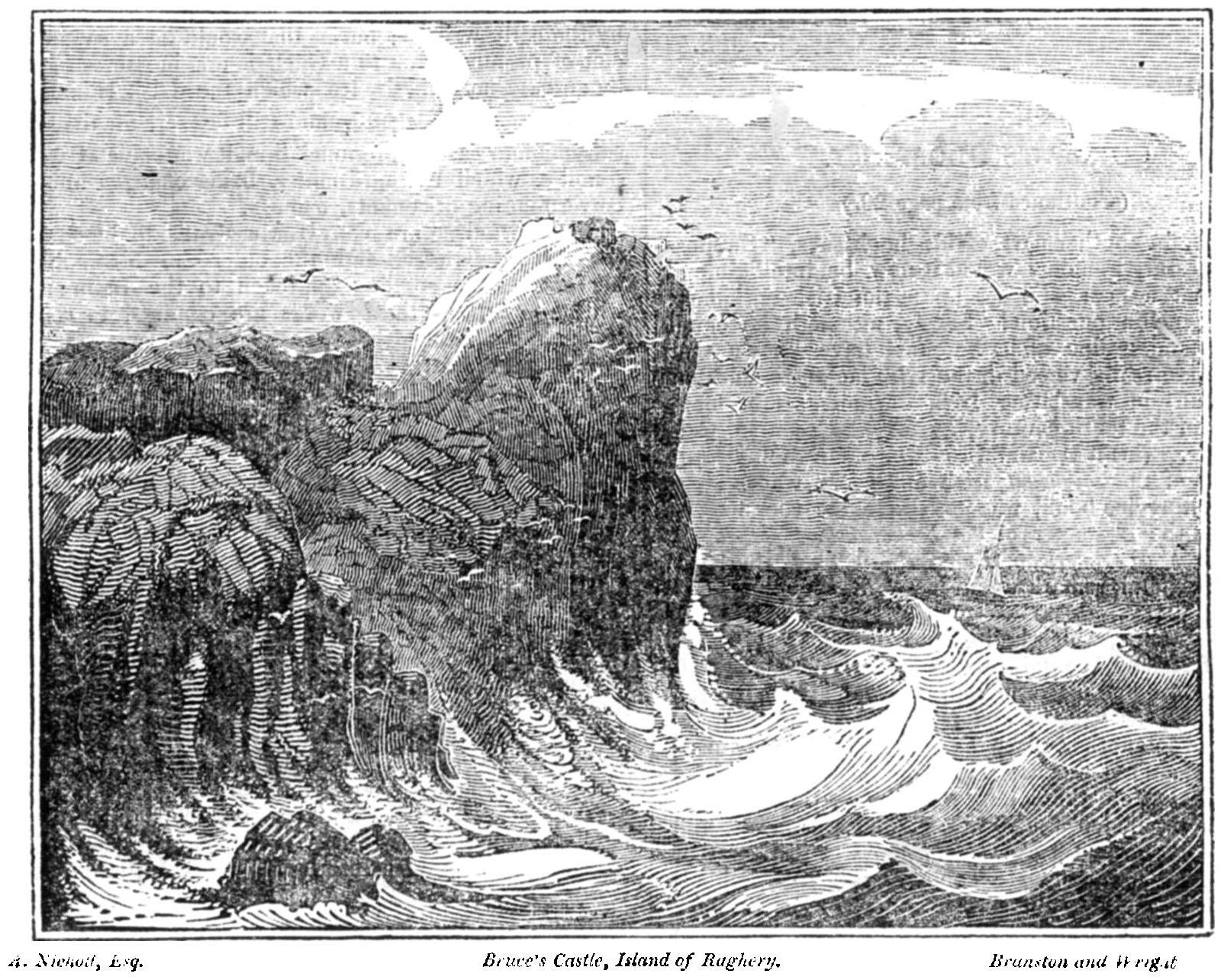
- Bruce's Castle, Island of Raghery, 1833, sketched by Andrew Nicholl for the Dublin Penny Journal

Site information
- Condition: Ruin

Location
- Coordinates: 55.297222°N 6.169167°W

Rathlin Castle, also known as Bruce's Castle, was a castle on Rathlin Island off the coast of County Antrim in Northern Ireland.

== History ==
Rathlin Castle was probably built for Sir John de Courcy in the early thirteenth century. In 1213, it was granted to Donnchad mac Gilla Brigte, and passed into the possession of the de Lacys two years later. Later in the century, it passed into the possession of the Bissets.

In 1306, after being defeated by Sir Aymer de Valence at the Battle of Methven, and then by the Lord of Lorne at the Battle of Strathfillan, King Robert I of Scotland retired to Rathlin Castle for the winter with a small following of his most faithful men, including James Douglas, Lord of Douglas, Bruce's brothers Thomas, Alexander and Edward, as well as Sir Neil Campbell and Malcolm II, the Earl of Lennox. Angus Og Macdonald, friend to Robert Bruce, had brought them there in his galleys from Dunaverty on Kintyre with three hundred of his men. They were welcomed by the owners of the island and castle, the Scoto-Irish Bissett family, Lords of the Glens of Antrim, who were kin to the Macdonalds. Later, the Bissetts were dispossessed of the castle by the English for this reason.

In July 1575, English forces led by Francis Drake and John Norreys attacked the castle with cannons and upon the surrender of the garrison of some MacDonnells of Antrim, the defenders, except for some prisoners, and the island's residents were put to the sword; the event is known as the Rathlin Island Massacre. The main army of MacDonnells of Antrim, led by Sorley Boy MacDonnell and stationed at Ballycastle, had witnessed the event taking place on Rathlin Island, where their families and valuables had been lodged for safety. Sorley Boy led his army in a successful retaliatory raid on Carrickfergus, from where the Rathlin Island raid had left.
