= Rathlin Island =

Island of County Antrim, Northern Ireland

Coordinates: 55°17′42″N 06°11′51″W

Rathlin Island: Irish: Reachlainn; Scots: Racherie
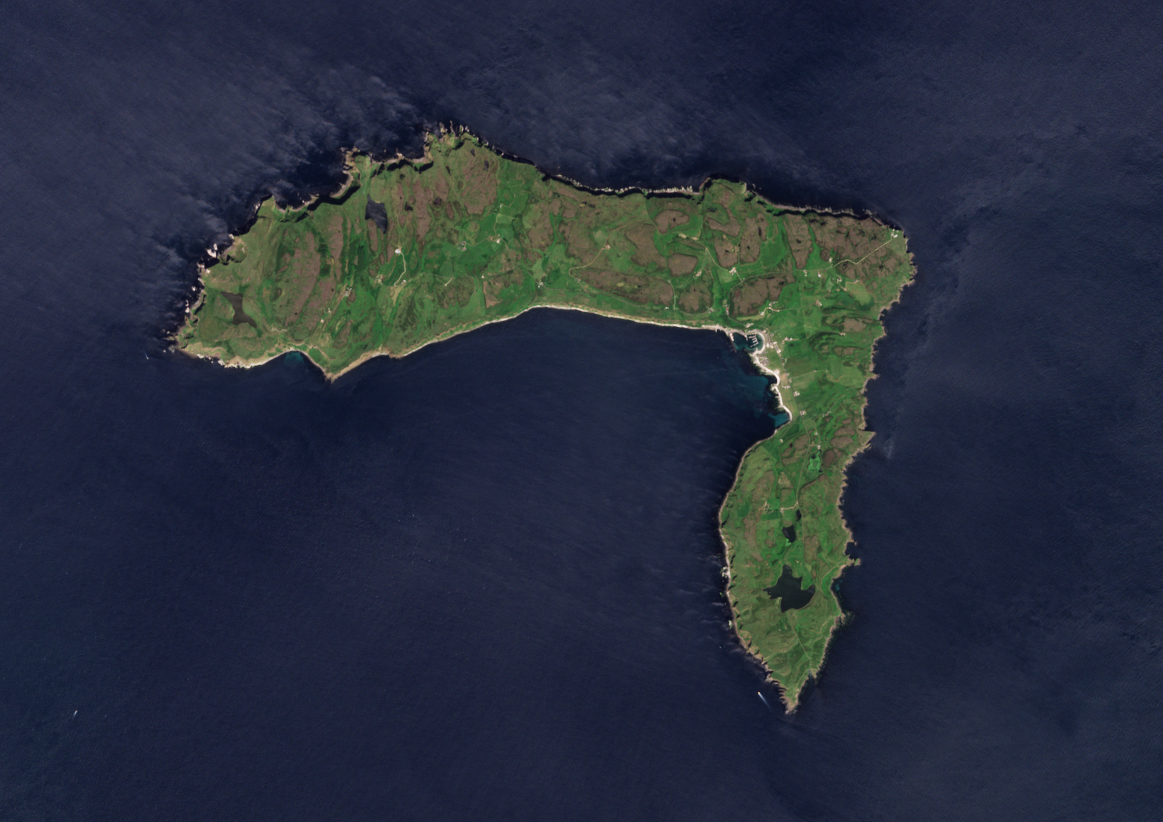
- True-color ESA Sentinel-2 image of Rathlin Island

- Location within Northern Ireland
- Population: 141 (2021 Census)
- Irish grid reference: D134518
  - Belfast: 47 mi (76 km)
- District: Causeway Coast and Glens Borough Council
- County: County Antrim
- Country: Northern Ireland
- Sovereign state: United Kingdom
- Post town: Ballycastle
- Postcode district: BT54
- Dialling code: 028
- Police: Northern Ireland
- Fire: Northern Ireland
- Ambulance: Northern Ireland
- UK Parliament: North Antrim
- Website: Rathlin Development & Community Association's official website

Rathlin Island (Irish: Reachlainn, pronounced [ˈɾˠaxlən̠ʲ]; Local Irish dialect: Reachraidh, Irish pronunciation: [ˈɾˠaxɾˠi]; Scots: Racherie) is an island and civil parish off the coast of Northern Ireland. It is part of County Antrim and is Northern Ireland's northernmost point. As of the 2021 Census there were 141 people living on the island.

== Geography ==
Rathlin is the only inhabited offshore island of Northern Ireland, with a population of approximately 150 people, and is the most northerly inhabited island off the coast of Northern Ireland. The reverse L-shaped Rathlin Island is four miles (six kilometres) from east to west, and 2 1/2 miles (4 kilometres) from north to south.

The highest point on the island is Slieveard, 134 metres (440 feet) above sea level. Rathlin is 15 1/2 nautical miles (29 kilometres) from the Mull of Kintyre, the southern tip of Scotland's Kintyre peninsula. It is part of the Causeway Coast and Glens council area, and is represented by the Rathlin Development & Community Association.

=== Townlands ===
Rathlin is part of the traditional barony of Cary (around the town of Ballycastle), and of Causeway Coast and Glens Borough Council. The island constitutes a civil parish and is subdivided into 22 townlands:

Rathlin with subdivision into townlands

Townland	Area acres	Population
Ballycarry	298	...
Ballyconagan	168	...
Ballygill Middle	244	...
Ballygill North	149	...
Ballygill South	145	...
Ballynagard	161	...
Ballynoe	80	...
Carravinally (Corravina Beg)	116	...
Carravindoon (Corravindoon)	188	...
Church Quarter	51	...
Cleggan (Clagan)	202	...
Craigmacagan (Craigmacogan)	153	...
Demesne	67	...
Glebe	24	...
Kebble	269	...
Kilpatrick	169	...
Kinkeel	131	...
Kinramer North	167	...
Kinramer South (Kinramer)	173	...
Knockans	257	...
Mullindross (Mullindress)	46	...
Roonivoolin	130	...
Rathlin	3388 (1371 ha)	...

== Demography ==
=== 2021 Census ===
Rathlin Island is labelled as The_Glens_B1 Data Zone by the Northern Ireland Statistics and Research Agency (NISRA). As of the 2021 Census it is the smallest of the agency's data zones. On Census day (21 March 2021) there were 141 people living in Rathlin Island

- 57.5% (81) of the islanders belonged to, or were brought up in, the Catholic religion, 19.9% (28) belonged to or were brought up in a Protestant or other Christian denomination, 17.7% (25) had no religious background and 5.0% (7) came from other religious backgrounds.
- 38.3% had an Irish national identity, 39.0% had a Northern Irish national identity and 22.0% indicated that they had a British national identity (Respondents could select more than one nationality).
- 31.91% claim to have some knowledge of the Irish language, whilst 8.51% claim to be able to speak, read, write and understand spoken Irish. 4.26% claim to use Irish daily. 0.00% claim that Irish is their main language.
- 21.28% claim to have some knowledge of Ulster Scots, whilst 2.84% claim to be able to speak, read, write and understand spoken Ulster Scots. 2.13% claim to use Ulster Scots daily.

== Irish language ==
The Irish language (Irish: Gaelca pronounced [ˈge̱:lkə]) was spoken on Rathlin Island for most of the last 2,500 years, prior to being gradually replaced within the community by English through a process of language shift that started in the 17th century. It is not known if the 1722 parish church of the established Church of Ireland preached locally in Irish, English or both, although the Church of Ireland had already translated the Bible and the Book of Common Prayer into Irish, which were used in Ireland and Scotland. Initially English was confined to trading with outsiders and amongst a small but growing number of newcomers during the 18th century, most islanders continued to speak Irish. Nevertheless knowledge and use of English increased and expanded on Rathlin until English eventually replaced Irish as the common community language probably some time in the middle of the 19th century. Irish persisted for a few decades as a family language amongst some islanders until they too switched to English. The last native Irish speakers on the island died in the 1950s and 1960s.

The local dialect shows many features typical for Scottish Gaelic and not found in other dialects of Ireland, e.g. forming plurals with -(e)an Irish pronunciation: [ənˠ], use of the interrogative có (standard Irish cé), it uses the object pronouns e, i for subjects of finite verbs, etc. It is nevertheless mutually intelligible with dialects of the Irish mainland in the Glens of Antrim. The features shared with Irish dialects are typically retentions that were lost in Scotland between the 17th and 20th century rather than innovations common with Irish, e.g. retention of eclipsis of p, t, c, f (but not b, d, g) after some words ending in a consonant (eg. nar bpeacaidh 'our sins', nar bpiúr 'our sister', seacht bpont 'seven pounds').

== Transport ==
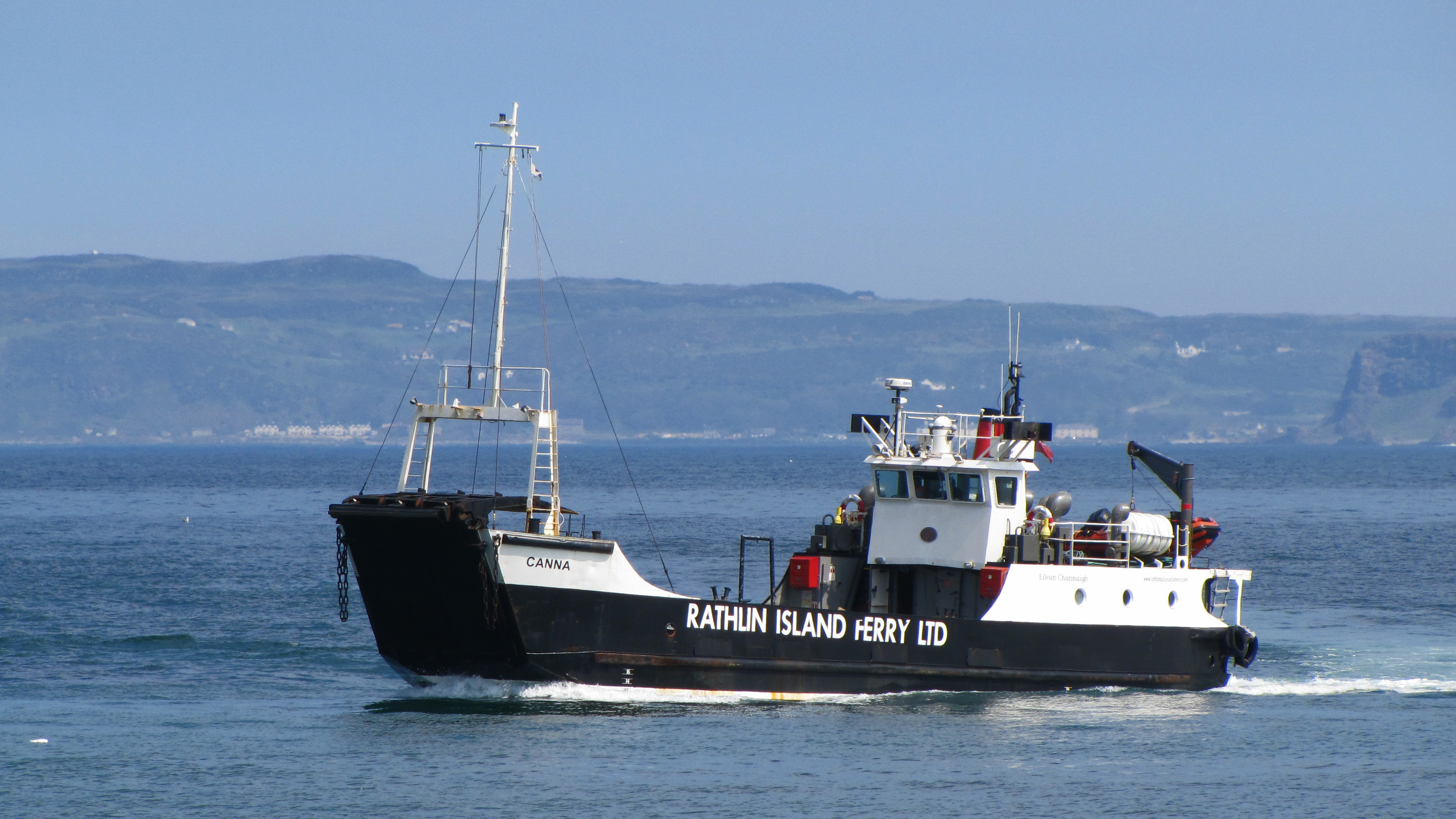
The old Rathlin Island Ferry

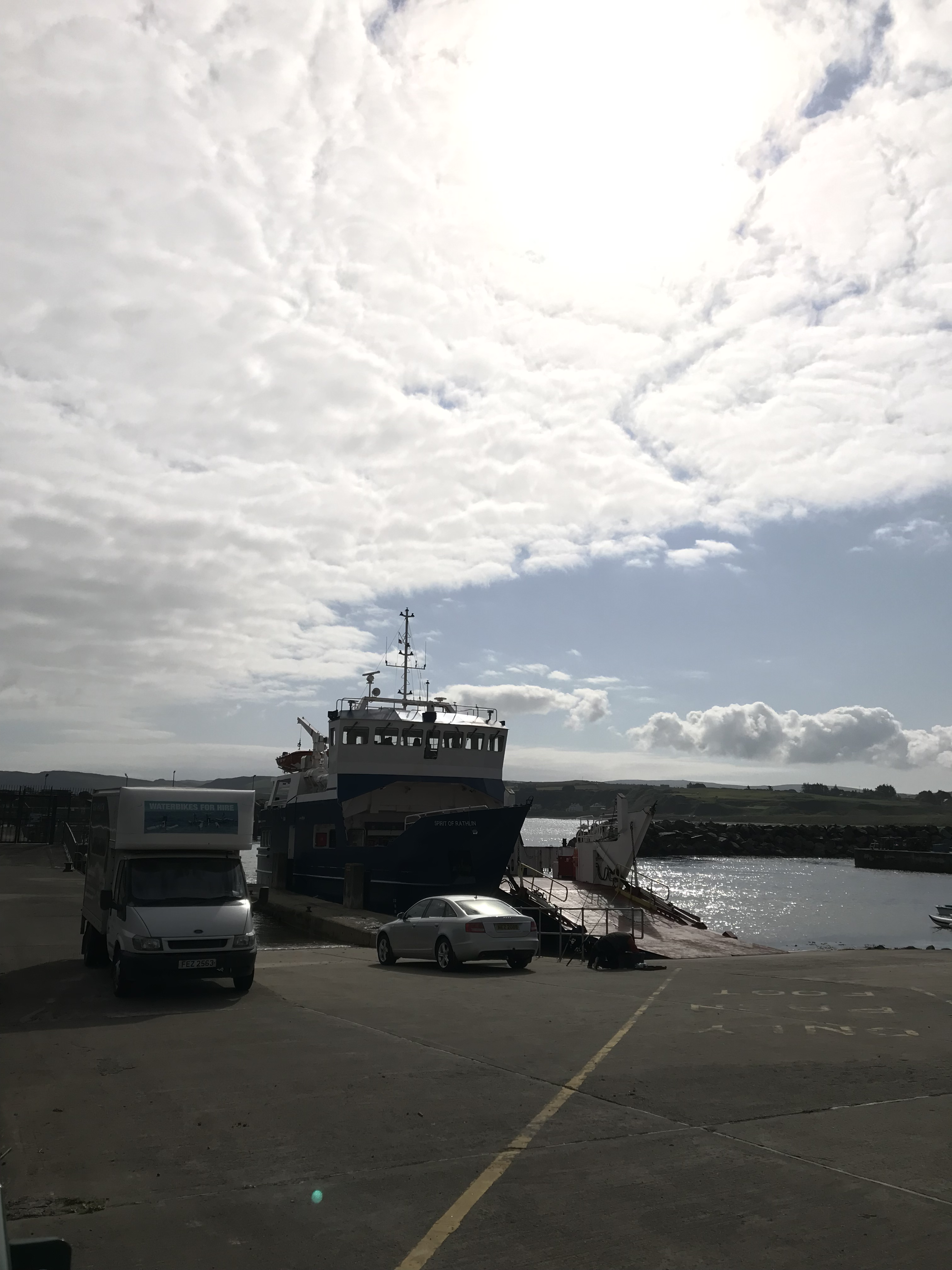
Spirit of Rathlin Ferry 2019

A ferry operated by Rathlin Island Ferry Ltd connects the main port of the island, Church Bay, with the mainland at Ballycastle, six nautical miles (eleven kilometres) away. Two ferries operate on the route – the fast foot-passenger-only catamaran ferry Rathlin Express and a purpose-built larger ferry, commissioned in May 2017, Spirit of Rathlin, which carries both foot passengers and a small number of vehicles, weather permitting. Rathlin Island Ferry Ltd won a six-year contract for the service in 2008 providing it as a subsidised "lifeline" service. There is an ongoing investigation on how the transfer was handled between the Environment Minister and the new owners.

== Natural history ==
Rathlin is mostly of prehistoric volcanic origin sitting on a foundation of marine sedimentary rocks. The lowermost rocks on Rathlin are the Cretaceous-aged Ulster White Limestone, correlative with the Chalk that forms the White Cliffs of Dover. The limestone contains fossils of belemnites. Overlying an unconformity, the bulk of the island's rock are basalt of the Lower Basalt series, with a weathered horizon of bright red laterite paleosols separating the lavas from the overlying Causeway Basalts. The Causeway series show well-developed columnar jointing, and are named for the exposures at the Giant's Causeway in mainland Northern Ireland. Both packages of lava are part of the British Tertiary Volcanic Province.

The island was owned by Rev Robert Gage who was also the island's rector. He had two daughters, Adelaide in 1832 and Dorothea in 1835. Adelaide was a botanist who wrote a book concerning the island's flora and fauna. She visited Dorothea in Germany after she married his Serene Highness Prince Albrecht zu Waldeck und Pyrmont. Adelaide was buried in Ramoan Churchyard in Ballycastle in 1920 and her book on Rathlin is now lost.

Rathlin is one of 43 Special Areas of Conservation in Northern Ireland. It is home to tens of thousands of seabirds, including common guillemots, kittiwakes, puffins and razorbills – about thirty bird families in total. It is visited by birdwatchers, with a Royal Society for the Protection of Birds (RSPB) nature reserve that has views of Rathlin's bird colony. The RSPB first purchased parts of the island's North Cliffs during the 1970s, then other areas, and has successfully managed natural habitat to facilitate the return of the red-billed chough. Northern Ireland's only breeding pair of choughs can be seen during the summer months. Bird breeding has also benefitted from projects to eliminate invasive ferret and rat populations, which preyed on the predominantly ground-nesting birds.

The cliffs on this relatively bare island stand 70 metres (230 ft) tall. Bruce's Cave is named after Robert the Bruce, also known as Robert I of Scotland: it was here that he was said to have seen the legendary spider which is described as inspiring Bruce to continue his fight for Scottish independence. The island is also the northernmost point of the Antrim Coast and Glens Area of Outstanding Natural Beauty.

In 2008-09, the Maritime and Coastguard Agency of the United Kingdom and the Marine Institute Ireland undertook bathymetric survey work north of Antrim, updating Admiralty charts (Joint Irish Bathymetric Survey Project). In doing so a number of interesting submarine geological features were identified around Rathlin Island, including a submerged crater or lake on a plateau with clear evidence of water courses feeding it. This suggests the events leading to inundation – subsidence of land or rising water levels – were extremely quick.

Marine investigations in the area have also identified new species of sea anemone, rediscovered the fan mussel (the UK's largest and rarest bivalve mollusc – thought to be found only in Plymouth Sound and a few sites off the west of Scotland) and a number of shipwreck sites, including HMS Drake, which was torpedoed and sank just off the island in 1917.

=== Algae ===
Species of algae recorded from Rathlin, such as Hypoglossum hypoglossoides (Stackh.) Coll. et Harv., Apoglossum ruscifolium (Turn.) J.Ag., Radicilingua thysanorhizans (Holm.) Papenf. and Haraldiophyllum bonnemaisonii (Kylin) Zinova, were noted by Osborne Morton in 1994. Maps showing the distribution of algae all around the British Isles, including Rathlin Island, are to be found in Harvey and Guiry 2003.

=== Flowering plants ===
Details and notes of the flowering plants are to be found in Hackney.

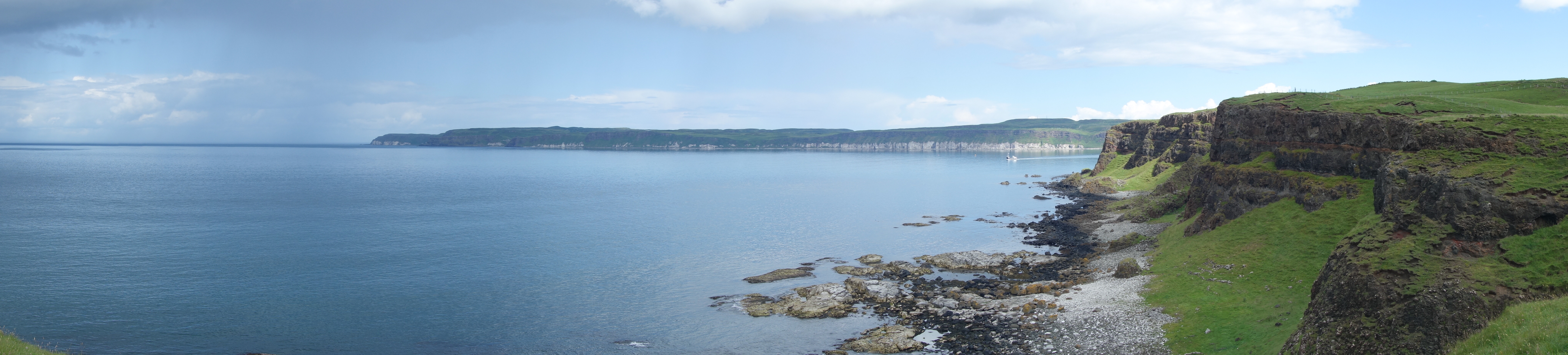
Panorama of Rathlin Island

== Archaeology ==
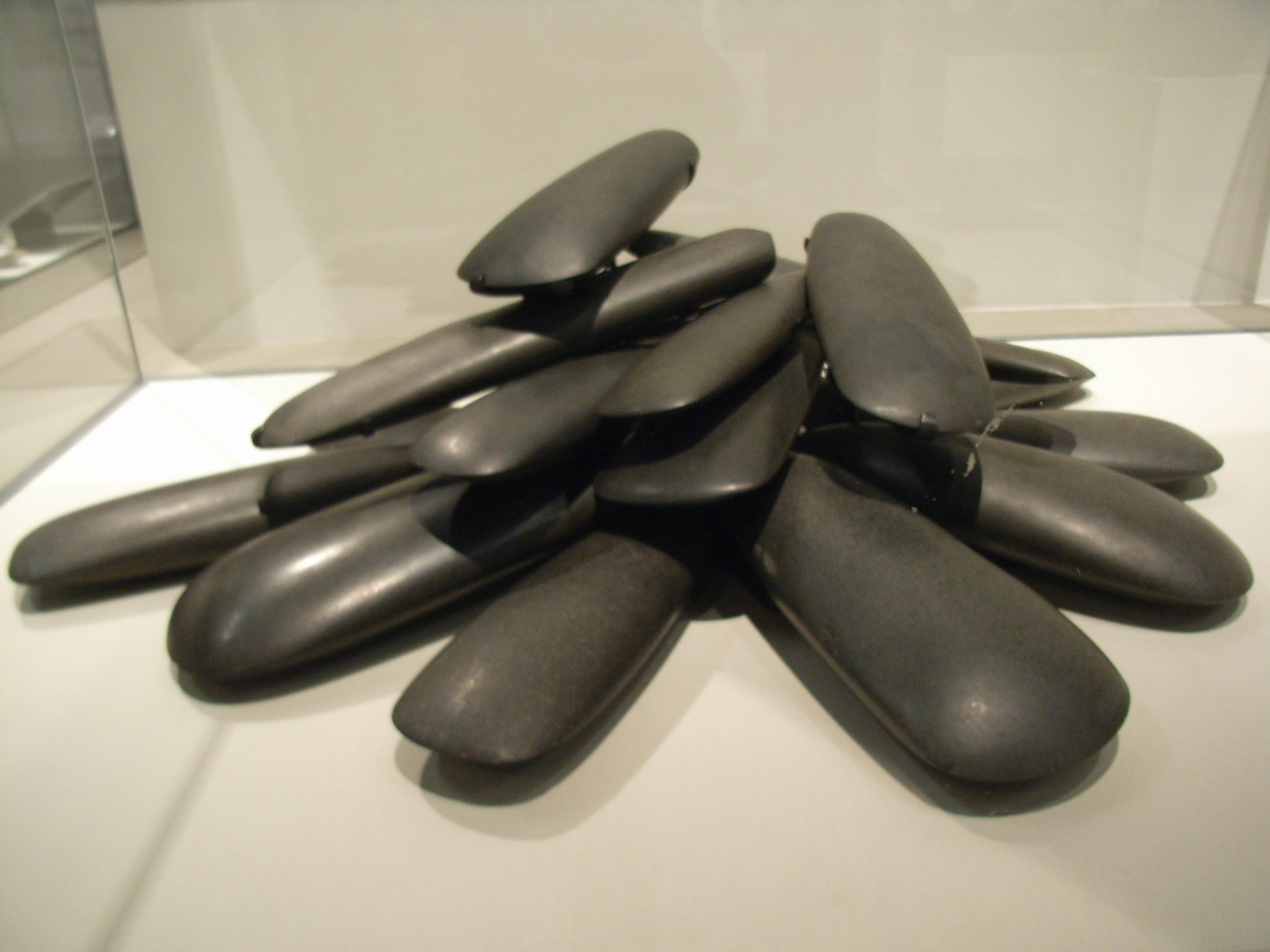
Malone hoard of polished axes made from material from Tievebulliagh

The island has been settled at least as far back as the Mesolithic period. A Neolithic stone axe factory featuring porcellanite stone is to be found in Brockley, a cluster of houses within the townland of Ballygill Middle. It is similar to a stone axe factory found at Tievebulliagh mountain on the nearby mainland coast. The products of these two axe factories, which cannot be reliably distinguished from each other, were traded across Ireland; these were the most important Irish stone axe sources of their time.

In 2006, an ancient burial was discovered when a driveway was being expanded by the island's only pub, dating back to the early Bronze Age, c. 2000 BC. Genomic analysis of DNA from the bodies showed a strong continuity with the genetics of the modern Irish population and established that the continuity of Irish population dates back at least 1000 years longer than had previously been understood.

There is also an unexcavated Viking vessel in a mound formation.

== History ==
Rathlin was probably known to the Romans, Pliny referring to "Reginia" and Ptolemy to "Rhicina" or "Eggarikenna". In the 7th century, Adomnán mentions "Rechru" and "Rechrea insula", which may also have been early names for Rathlin. The 11th century Irish version of the Historia Brittonum states that the Fir Bolg "took possession of Man and of other islands besides – Arran, Islay and 'Racha'" – another possible early variant.

Rathlin was the site of the first Viking raid on Ireland, according to the Annals of Ulster. The pillaging of the island's church and burning of its buildings took place in 795.

In 1306, Robert the Bruce sought refuge upon Rathlin, owned by the Irish Bissett family. He stayed in Rathlin Castle, originally belonging to their lordship the Glens of Antrim. The Bissetts were dispossessed of Rathlin by the English, who were in control of the Earldom of Ulster, for welcoming Bruce. In the 16th century, the island came into the possession of the MacDonnells of Antrim.

Rathlin has been the site of a number of massacres. On an expedition in 1557, Sir Henry Sidney devastated the island. In July 1575, the Earl of Essex sent Francis Drake and John Norreys to confront Scottish refugees on the island, and in the ensuing massacre, hundreds of men, women and children of Clan MacDonnell were killed. Sorley Boy MacDonnell sacked Carrickfergus in revenge for the English massacre of clan dependents on Rathlin Island. Also in 1642, Covenanter Campbell soldiers of the Argyll's Foot were encouraged by their commanding officer Sir Duncan Campbell of Auchinbreck to kill the local Catholic MacDonalds, near relatives of their arch clan enemy in the Scottish Highlands Clan MacDonald. They threw scores of MacDonald women over cliffs to their deaths on rocks below. The number of victims of this massacre has been put as low as 100 and as high as 3,000.

On 2 October 1917, the armoured cruiser HMS Drake was torpedoed off the northern Irish coast by German submarine U-79. She steamed into Church Bay on Rathlin Island, where, after her crew was taken off, she capsized and sank. On 27 January 1918, the RMS Andania was hit amidships by a torpedo from German submarine U-46 captained by Leo Hillebrand. The ship immediately took a list to starboard and began to sink. Attempts were made to tow the ship but it sank after a few hours. The passengers were saved, but Andania's sinking killed seven crew members. The wreck is lying at a depth of between 175 and 189 metres (574 and 620 ft).

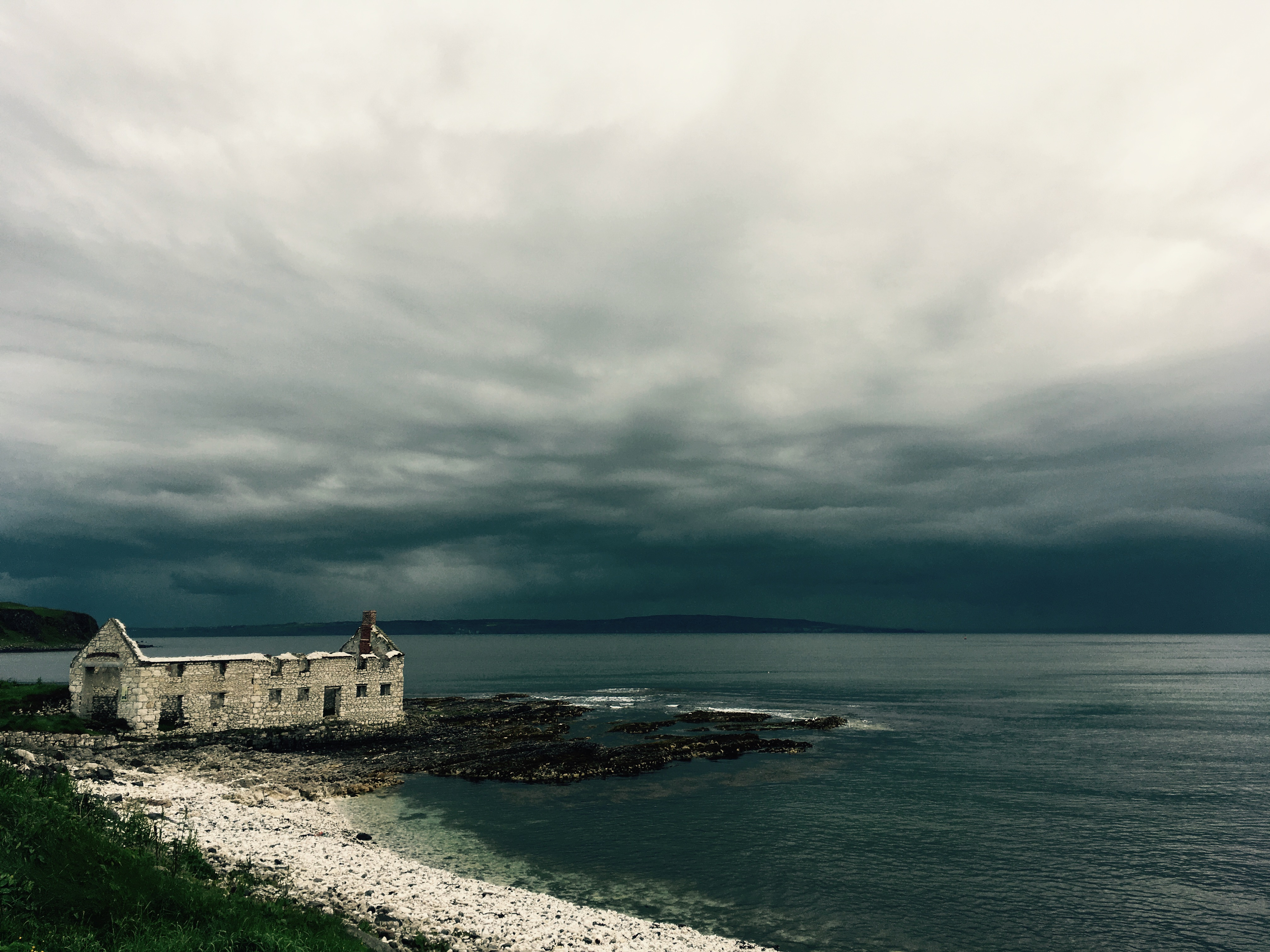
Old derelict kelp store

The island has been represented on the Islands Forum by the Rathlin Development and Community Association since 2022.

=== Ownership dispute and political status ===
Historically it was unclear whether Rathlin Island was part of the Kingdom of Ireland or the Kingdom of Scotland. In 1604, the island was included in a land grant made out to Randal MacDonnell, 1st Earl of Antrim, granted by George Carey as Lord Deputy of Ireland on the instructions of King James VI and I. However, the validity of Antrim's grant was disputed in 1617 by a Scotsman, George Crawford, laird of Leiffnoris in Ayrshire. Crawford claimed that King James IV of Scotland had granted his family the island in 1500. Lord Chichester ruled that Rathlin was part of Ireland, as it had been considered part of County Antrim since its creation. MacDonnell compiled significant historical evidence as part of his defence, including calling on Irish chronicler Cú Choigríche Ó Duibhgeannáin to attend the hearing. However, the case became best known for MacDonnell's submission that Rathlin "neither breeds nor nourishes any living thing venomous, but is clear of them as Ireland", in line with the legendary role of Saint Patrick in banishing snakes from Ireland.

Following the 2016 United Kingdom European Union membership referendum, a group of island residents established Rathlin Scotland, an organisation seeking to transfer the island to Scotland in anticipation of a second Scottish independence referendum that would allow Rathlin to remain in the European Union.

== Commerce ==
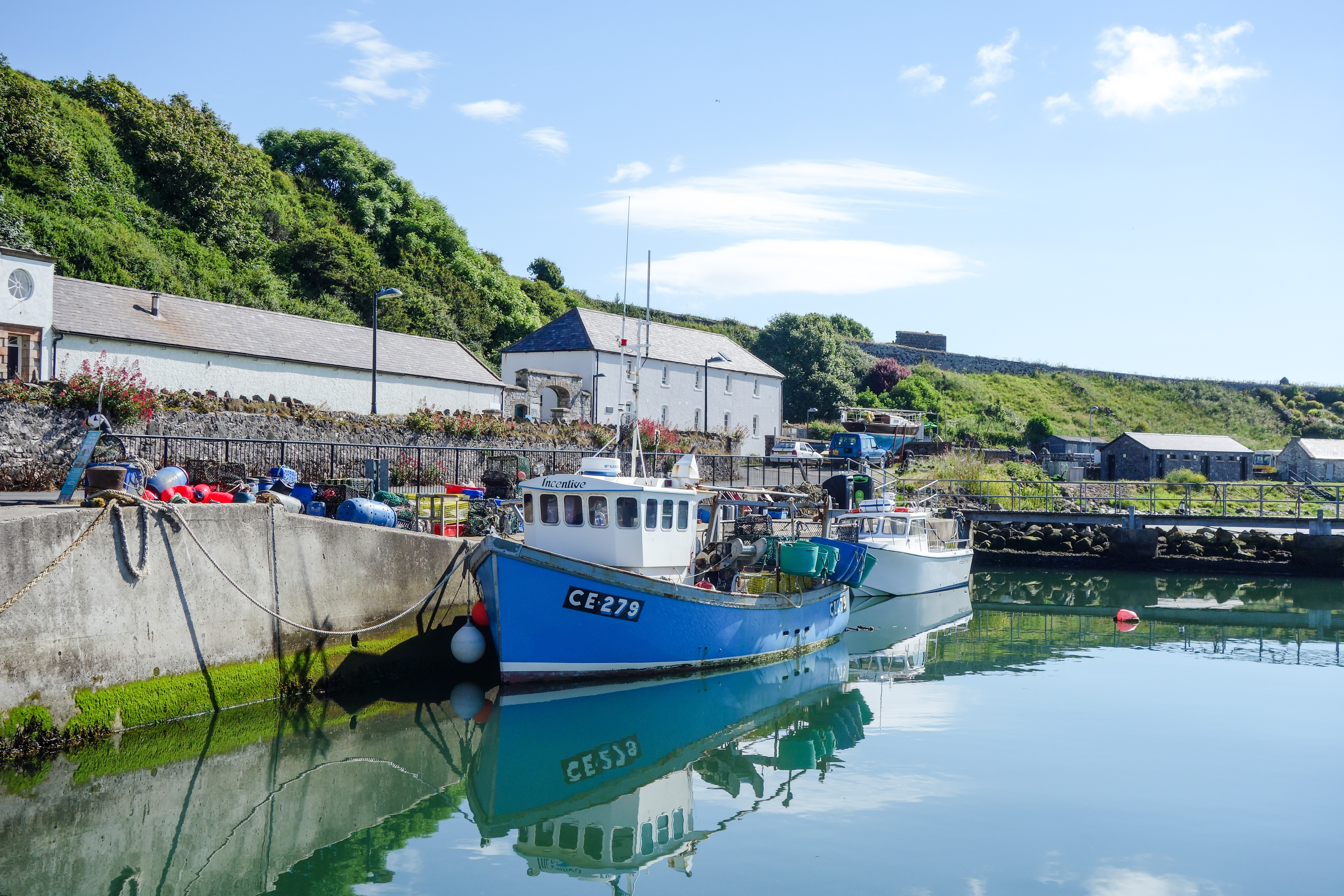
Rathlin Island harbour

In 1746, the island was purchased by the Reverend John Gage. Rathlin was an important producer of kelp in the 18th century.

A 19th-century British visitor to the island found that they had an unusual form of government where they elected a judge who sat on a "throne of turf". In fact, Robert Gage was the "proprietor of the island" until his death in 1891. Gage held a master's degree from Trinity College, Dublin, but he spent his life on the island creating his book "The Birds of Rathlin Island".

Tourism is now a commercial activity. The island had a population of over one thousand in the 19th century. Its current permanent population is around 125. This is swollen by visitors in the summer, with most coming to view the cliffs and their huge seabird populations. Many visitors come for the day, and the island has around 30 beds for overnight visitors. The Boathouse Visitors' Centre at Church Bay is open seven days a week from April to September, with minibus tours and bicycle hire also available. The island is also popular with scuba divers, who come to explore the many wrecked ships in the surrounding waters.

Richard Branson's hot air balloon crashed near Rathlin Island in 1987.

On 29 January 2008, the RNLI Portrush lifeboat Katie Hannan grounded after a swell hit its stern on breakwater rocks just outside the harbour on Rathlin while trying to refloat an islander's RIB. The lifeboat was declared beyond economical repair and handed over to a salvage company.

== Communications ==
The world's first commercial wireless telegraphy link was established by employees of Guglielmo Marconi between East Lighthouse on Rathlin and Kenmara House in Ballycastle on 6 July 1898.

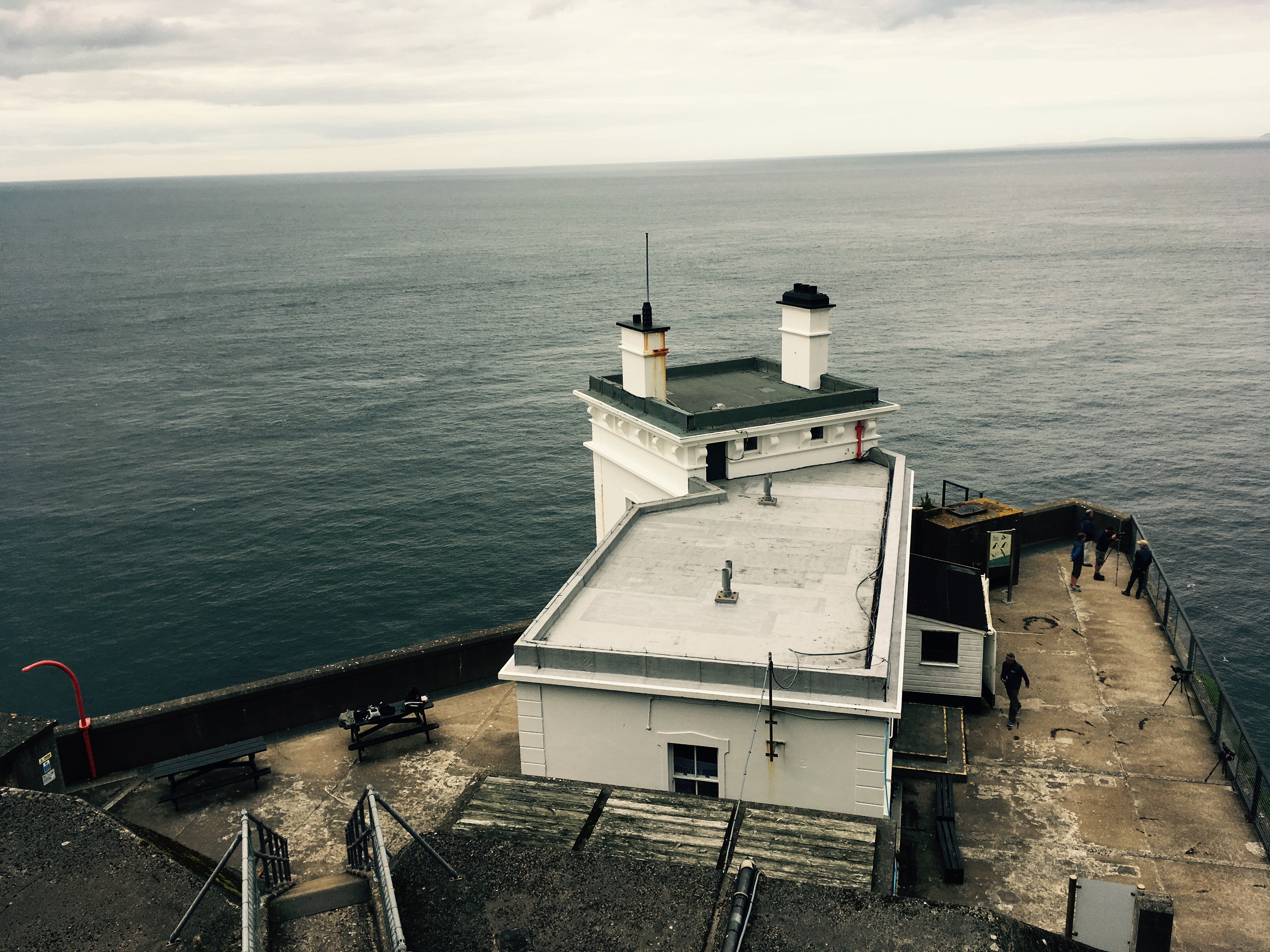
West Lighthouse

In July 2013, BT installed a high-speed wireless broadband pilot project to a number of premises, the first deployment of its kind anywhere in the UK, 'Wireless to the cabinet' (WTTC) to deliver 80 Mb/s to users.

== Notable people ==
- Catherine Gage (1815–1892), botanical and ornithological illustrator
- Alexander Smyth (1765–1830), lawyer, soldier, and politician in Virginia
