= John Cathanach MacDonald, 4th of Dunnyveg =

John Cathanach MacDonald Seán Cathanach Mac Dhòmhnaill
- Title: 4th Clan Chief (styled)
- Predecessor: John Mor MacDonald, 3rd of Dunnyveg
- Successor: Alexander MacDonald, 5th of Dunnyveg

John Cathanach MacDonald, 4th of Dunnyveg (Scottish Gaelic: Seán Cathanach Mac Dhòmhnaill), Scottish-Gaelic lord, killed 1499.

== Biography ==
MacDonald was a son of John Mor MacDonald, 3rd of Dunnyveg and Sabina, daughter of Felim O'Neill of Clandeboy. John Mor was charged with treason and refused to surrender to King James IV of Scotland. With his father and three sons they were captured through the treachery of their kinsman, John MacIan of Ardnamurchan. MacDonald and his sons (John Mor, John Og, and Donald Balloch) were tried, convicted of treason and hung on the Boroughmuir (now Burgh Muir) in 1499. (A fourth son, Alexander, had fled to Ireland and thus became the next head of the lineage.)

== Family ==
By his wife, Cecelia, daughter of Robert Savage, Lord of the Ardes, they had the following children:

- Alexander, fled to Ireland, married Catherine, daughter of John Macdonald of Ardnamurchan, died in 1538 at Stirling, Scotland
- John Mor, executed in 1499 with his father.
- John Og, executed in 1499 with his father.
- Donald Balloch, executed in 1499 with his father.
- Angus Ileach, fled to Ireland.
- Agnes, who firstly married Donald Gallach MacDonald, 3rd of Sleat, had issue; and secondly married Torquil MacLeod of Lewes, had issue.
