= John Mór Tanister =

John Mór Tanister MacDonald Eòin Mòr Tànaiste Mac Dhòmhnaill
- Title: Clan Chief: MacDonald of Dunnyveg
- Successor: Donald Balloch MacDonald

John Mór Tanister MacDonald (Scottish Gaelic: Eòin Mòr Tànaiste Mac Dhòmhnaill, aka Iain Mac Dhòmhnaill), Scottish-Gaelic lord, died 1427.

== Biography ==
MacDonald was the second son of John of Islay, Lord of the Isles and Princess Margaret Stewart of Scotland, daughter of King Robert II. He is the founder of Clan MacDonald of Dunnyveg.

MacDonald was granted 120 merklands in Kintyre, with the castles of Dunaverty, Skipness and Airds and 60 merklands on Islay with the castle of Dunyvaig upon his father's death. Not being satisfied with his inheritance, he led a revolt against his brother Donald of Islay, Lord of the Isles as MacDonald was recognized as the heir-apparent (tanistry). The rebellion started in 1387 and went on into the 1390s, and MacDonald obtained the support of the powerful Clan MacLean kindred. However, MacDonald and the MacLeans were eventually forced to submit to Dómhnall, and by 1395 MacDonald had been forced to flee into Ireland. There he entered the service of King Richard II of England in Antrim and later King Henry IV.

Through his marriage with Margery Byset, a daughter of the MacEoin Bisset, Lord of the Glens, according to MacDonald shanachies he received as the dowry the Glens and Rathlin Island in Ireland, then becoming known as Lord of Dunnyvaig and the Glens. Though he may have used this title, the MacEoin Bissets continued to hold the Glens of Antrim until as late as 1522, when the last known died in battle.

MacDonald successfully led the reserve at the Battle of Harlaw just north of Inverurie in Aberdeenshire on 24 July 1411, and later fought against Robert Stewart, Regent Albany who had forayed into Argyll to try and defeat Donald of Islay. Albany was driven back by John Mor.

MacDonald was attacked and murdered by James Campbell, agent for King James, after a scheduled meeting at Ard-du, Islay in 1427. He was buried on the Isle of Iona in Reilig Odhrain (St. Oran's cemetery) where the "great men of the royal blood of Clan Donald" were buried per Dean Munro, 1549, on the Council of the Isles.

== Children ==
- Donald Balloch MacDonald (d. 1476), married Johanna, daughter of Conn O'Neill of Edenduffcarrick
- Ranald Bane MacDonald, 1st of Largie, illegitimate son of John Mór Tanister MacDonald and a daughter of Finguine MacKinnon, ("the Green Abbot").
