= John Mor MacDonald, 3rd of Dunnyveg =

John Mor MacDonald Seán Mór Mac Dhòmhnaill
- Title: 3rd Clan Chief
- Predecessor: Donald Balloch MacDonald
- Successor: Alexander MacDonald, 5th of Dunnyveg

John Mor MacDonald (Scottish Gaelic: Seán Mór Mac Dhòmhnaill), fl. 1499, was third lord of Clan Donald.

== Biography ==
John Mor was a son of Donald Balloch MacDonald and Johanna, daughter of Conn O'Neill of Edenduffcarrick. He was the third chief of Clan MacDonald of Dunnyveg, also called Clan Donald South.

With his father, he signed the Treaty of Ardtornish in October 1461, which proposed that Scotland be divided between King Edward IV of England and James Douglas, 9th Earl of Douglas. He succeeded to the chieftainship of the clan after his father died at Islay in 1476.

In 1493, with John of Islay being required to forfeit his title of Lord of the Isles and pay homage to King James IV of Scotland, the King garrisoned and provisioned Tarbert and Dunaverty Castle with royal forces in 1494. Sir John MacDonald, whom the king had recently knighted and to whom John had rendered homage, retook Dunaverty Castle just as the King was sailing for Stirling. The dead body of the castle's governor was hung over the castle walls in sight of the King and his departing entourage. The King, infuriated by Sir John's actions, declared Sir John a traitor and summoned him to Edinburgh for treason..

Sir John Macdonald ignored the summons and continued to reside at Islay. He and his sons were captured through the treachery of his kinsman John MacIan of Ardnamurchan. Sir John, his son John Cathanach and John Cathanach's sons John Mor, John Og and Donald Balloch were tried, convicted of treason and hung on the Burgh Muir in 1499. John Cathanach's remaining son, Alexander Carragh, fled to Ireland and became the next chief of the clan and 5th earl of Dunnyveg.

== Family ==
By his wife Sabina (Sarah), daughter of Felim O'Neill of Clandeboy, they had;

- John Cathanach, married Sheela (Cecelia) Savage, daughter of Robert Savage, Lord of the Ardes in Ireland. Executed in 1499.
- Alistair Carragh
