= Donald Balloch MacDonald =

Scottish clan chief and peer

Donald Balloch MacDonald Dòmhnall Ballach Mac Dhòmhnaill
- Title: 2nd Clan Chief
- Predecessor: John Mór Tanister
- Successor: John Mor MacDonald, 3rd of Dunnyveg

Donald Balloch MacDonald (Scottish Gaelic: Dòmhnall Ballach Mac Dhòmhnaill) was a Scottish-Gaelic lord who died about 1476.

== Biography ==
Donald Balloch MacDonald was a son of John Mór Tanister and Margery Byset, daughter of MacEoin Bisset, Lord of The Glens. He was the second lord of Clan MacDonald of Dunnyveg, also known as Lord of Dunyvaig and the Glens.

He succeeded to the lordship after his father was murdered by James Campbell (the agent of James I of Scotland) after a scheduled meeting called at the king's request on the Isle of Islay in 1427. King James had James Campbell executed, but Campbell protested that it was done under the orders of the king.

Known as a military leader, at 18 years of age, Donald Balloch was chosen to lead Clan Donald in their revenge for the King's treachery and the humiliation of their chief, Alexander Macdonald, Lord of the Isles, aka Alexander of Islay, Earl of Ross when he surrendered to the king at Holyrood in 1429. The whole strength of Clan Donald was mustered under Donald Balloch. The royal army was encamped in Lochaber at Inverlochy Castle under the Earls of Mar and Caithness.

The resulting Battle of Inverlochy was a resounding victory for Clan Donald. Thus, once more, Alexander Stewart, Earl of Mar, had underestimated the might of Clan Donald, and the result was a complete rout and a great slaughter. Mar escaped wounded but Caithness was killed.

Subsequently, Donald Balloch returned with his booty to the Isles and from there to his lands in Antrim in Ireland.

In response, King James demanded of Hugh Buy O'Neill, an Irish chief in Ulster, that Donald be captured and sent dead or alive to the king. Instead, a pickled head was presented by Odo, Prince of Connaught to King James. But it was not that of Donald, who lived many years beyond this, a great hero. While Donald did not lose his head, he did lose his heart to O'Neill's daughter whom he afterwards married. After the death of King James I, he returned to Dunnyveg on Islay in 1437.

He died on an islet upon Loch Gruinart, Islay about 1476.

== Family ==
By his first wife Johanna, daughter of Conn O'Neill of Eden-duff-carrick Edenduffcarrick, prince of the Clandeboye O'Neills in Antrim. They had;

- John Mor MacDonald, m. Sabina O'Neill, daughter of Phelim Bacagh O'Neill
- Margaret, b. c. 1414 married Ruari MacDonald, 3rd of Clan Ranald.

By his second wife Joan, daughter of O'Donnell, Lord of Tyrconnell, they had;

- Agnes, who married Thomas Bannatyne of Knraes.
