= John of Islay, Lord of the Isles =

Lord of the Isles

John of Islay
- Lord of the Isles (1336–1386)
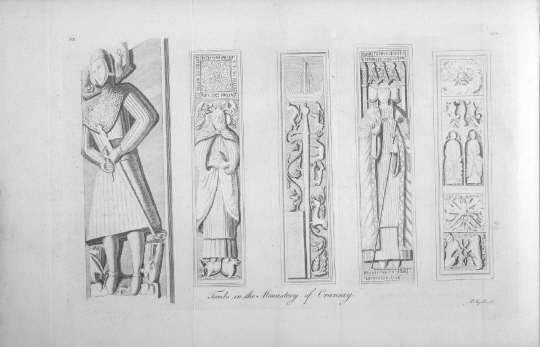
- 18th century illustration of some of the tombs of Oronsay Priory, founded by John of Islay sometime before 1358
- Successor: Donald of Islay, Lord of the Isles
- Born: c. 1320; Scotland
- Died: 1386; Ardtornish Castle, Morvern, Scotland
- Noble family: Clan Donald
- Spouses: Amie (sister of Ruairidh Mac Ruairidh, Lord of Garmoran); Margaret Stewart (daughter of Robert II of Scotland)
- Issue Among others: Ranald; Domhnall of Islay, Lord of the Isles; John Mór Tanister; Alastair Carrach
- Parents: Aonghus Óg of Islay; Áine Ní Chatháin

John of Islay (or John MacDonald) (Scottish Gaelic: Eòin Mac Dòmhnuill or Scottish Gaelic: Iain mac Aonghais Mac Dhòmhnuill) (died 1386) was the lord of the Isles (1336–1386) and chief of Clan Donald. In 1336, he styled himself Dominus Insularum ('Lord of the Isles'), although this was not the first ever recorded instance of the title in use. Some modern historians nevertheless count John as the first of the later medieval lords of the Isles, although this rather broad Latin style corresponds roughly with the older Gaelic title Rí Innse Gall ('King of the Isles'), in use since the Viking Age. For instance, the even more similar Latin title dominus de Inchegal ('Lord of the Hebrides'), applied to Raghnall Mac Somhairle in the mid-12th century. In fact John is actually styled Rí Innsi Gall or King of the Isles shortly after his death in a contemporary entry in the Irish Annals of Ulster. Clan Donald considers the title "Lord of the Isles" to have been in use at least since Angus Mor Macdonald, who died in 1293, and the title "King of the Isles" in use since Somerled, the Norse-Gael who forged the Kingdom of the Isles in the 12th century.

== Biography ==
John was the son of Aonghus Óg Mac Domhnaill, an Islay-based nobleman who had benefited from King Robert I of Scotland's attacks on the MacDougall (Mac Dhùghaill) rulers of Argyll and their Comyn allies, and had been given Ardnamurchan, Lochaber, Duror and Glencoe, turning the MacDonalds from the Hebridean "poor relations" into the most powerful kindred of the north-western seaboard. The loyalty of Aonghas to Robert, however, did not mean that John's loyalty to Robert's son and successor David II would follow suit. After Edward Balliol's coup against the Bruce regime in 1333, Edward attempted to court John. In 1336, Edward confirmed the territories which the Islay lords had acquired in the days of Robert I; and additionally, Edward awarded John the lands of Kintyre, Knapdale, Gigha, Colonsay, Mull, Skye, Lewis, and Morvern, held by magnates still loyal to the Bruces. John, however, never provided Edward with real assistance. Although Balliol's deposition by the supporters of David made the grants made to John void, John's pre-1336 possessions were confirmed by King David in 1343. Moreover, in 1346, John inherited the great Lordship of Garmoran through his marriage to Amie mac Ruari after the death of her brother Raghnall Mac Ruaidhrí. This meant that John's dominions now included all of the Hebrides except Skye, and all of the western seaboard from Morvern to Loch Hourn.

John continued to build his power base by allying himself with Robert II of Scotland, another West Highland magnate who was the designated heir of King David. After David went into English custody in 1346, Robert acted as the de facto ruler of Scotland north of the River Forth. In 1350, John was given Robert's daughter Margaret Stewart in marriage, and received Knapdale and Kintyre as dowry. However, Robert was the senior partner, and John had to divorce his first wife Amie; his sons Godfrey, John and Ranald by Amie were to be passed over in the succession in favour of any children by the marriage with Margaret. After the capture of the king and death of John Randolph at the Battle of Neville's Cross in 1346, John and Robert worked together taking control of the huge earldom of Moray, bringing MacDonald power into Lochaber and Stewart power into Badenoch.

David returned to Scotland in 1357, and resented these incursions into an earldom which David regarded as within his rights of disposal; the terms of the original grant of Moray to Thomas Randolph in 1312 stipulated that the earldom would revert to the Crown upon lack of issue. By 1368, King David had decided that an aggressive policy was needed in the north. In 1369, he marched to Inverness, where John submitted to his authority. John's submission, though, was followed swiftly by David's death on 22 February 1371. David was succeeded by John's close ally Robert. David had wished either to retain control of the earldom or to grant the earldom to either John or George Dunbar, the sons of Isabella Randolph, sister of the last earl. However, King Robert made sure that Badenoch remained within his own control and that John kept Lochaber. When the earldom was granted to John Dunbar by a parliament held at Scone in early 1372, the grant consisted only of the lowland part around Inverness. Robert also ensured that John's control of the Mac Ruairidh inheritance was legally recognised by charter, and in 1376 issued charters confirming John's control of Colonsay, Kintyre and Knapdale, and granted Lochaber to John and his Stewart wife together.

Soon after 1376, John's heir Domhnall may have been the de facto ruler. John lived until 1386, when he died at Ardtornish Castle in Morvern. He was buried in Iona. John's power had been built on both the loosening of royal authority in north-western Scotland after the First War of Scottish Independence and, more importantly, on allying with the right people at the right time. The success of John was so great that his successors could maintain a distance from the Crown that outlived the weak monarchy of the 14th century.

John was also a great cultural and religious patron. Although the Bishop of the Isles, based at Snizort on Skye, was outside his control and to some extent acted as a political rival, John did control Iona, the spiritual homeland of Scottish Christianity. The monastic establishment of Iona was run with John's approval by the MacKinnon (Mac Fhionnghuin) kindred. John also founded an Augustinian priory at Oronsay, an act unique in the period.

== Marriage and issue ==
By his first wife Amie, he had the following:

- Ranald, d. 1386, married a daughter of Walter Stewart, Earl of Atholl.
- Marjorie m. Andrew Finlay, Sheriff of Perth
- John, married Ellen, daughter of Gillespic Campbell.
- Godfrey

By his second wife Margaret, he had the following:

- Domhnall of Islay, Lord of the Isles, d. 1423, married Mariota Leslie, daughter of Sir Walter Leslie.
- John Mór Tanister, d. 1427, married Margery Bisset, daughter of Sir Hugh Bisset. Became Lord of Dunyvaig and the Glens.
- Alastair Carrach, d. c. 1440, married Mary, daughter of Malcolm, Earl of Lennox.
- Agnes, married Sir John Montgomerie of Ardrossan. They had a son, Alexander Montgomerie, 1st Lord Montgomerie.
- Hugh. Thane of Glentilt.
- Marcus
- Mary, married Lachlan Maclean of Duart. She may have been a daughter of John of Islay's first marriage.
- Elizabeth, also known as Margaret, married Angus Du Mackay, 7th of Strathnaver.
- A daughter, Christina, married Robert Savage, brother of Edmund, seneschal of Ulster in 1387.

== Notes ==
=== References ===
- Boardman, Stephen (1996). The Early Stewart Kings: Robert II and Robert III, 1371–1406. East Linton: Tuckwell Press. ISBN 1-898410-43-7.
- Brown, Michael (2004). The Wars of Scotland 1214–1371. The New Edinburgh History of Scotland. Vol. 4. Edinburgh: Edinburgh University Press. ISBN 0-7486-1238-6.
- McDonald, R. Andrew (1997). The Kingdom of the Isles: Scotland's Western Seaboard, c. 1100–c. 1336. East Linton: Tuckwell Press. ISBN 1-898410-85-2.
- Oram, Richard (2004). "The Lordship of the Isles, 1336–1545". In Donald Omand (ed.). The Argyll Book. Edinburgh: Birlinn. pp. 123–139. ISBN 1-84158-253-0.
- Sellar, W. D. H. (2000). "Hebridean Sea-Kings: the Successors of Somerled, 1164–1316". In Edward J. Cowan & R. Andrew McDonald (ed.). Alba: Celtic Scotland in the Medieval Era. East Linton: Tuckwell Press. pp. 187–218. ISBN 1-86232-151-5.

Preceded by Aonghas Óg	Lord of Islay; 1299–1318	Succeeded by Domhnall
Preceded by New Creation	Lord of the Isles; 1336–1386	Succeeded by Domhnall
Preceded by Raghnall MacRuaridh	Lord of Garmoran; 1346–1386	Succeeded by Raghnall MacDonald
Preceded by Vacant*; *Last held by John Randolph as Earl of Moray	Lord of Lochaber; 1376–1386	Succeeded by Alexander MacDonald
