= Margery Byset =

Scots-Irish woman

- Born: 14th century Glens of Antrim
- Died: 15th century Islay
- Family: Bissett; MacDonnell
- Father: Mac Eoin Bissett
- Mother: Sabia O'Neill

Margery Byset (Bisset, Bissett; also Marjery, Margaret, Marie) was an Irish noblewoman belonging to the Bissett family whose marriage to John Mór Tanister MacDonnell in 1399 laid the basis for the Clan Donald claim to the Glens of Antrim, the lordship of which her family had established in the 13th century. She is the ancestress of the Clan MacDonald of Dunnyveg.

== Parentage ==
Margery appears to have been the daughter of the Mac Eoin Bissett, Lord of the Glens, and Sabia O'Neill (died 1387), a princess of the O'Neill dynasty. This is all that is relatively certain, however, because no medieval Bissett pedigree has survived, the family falling from power in the Glens of Antrim in or not long after 1522, following the Battle of Knockavoe, and not being recorded by Duald Mac Firbis in the mid-17th century except in reference to their maternal kin the MacDonnells, who replaced them. Mac Firbis uniquely describes the Bissetts as being of Greek origin, first arriving in England with William the Conqueror. As far as Margery's likely mother Sabia it is possible she was one of the four daughters of Aodh Reamhar Ó Néill, King of Ulster, whose names were unknown to the 19th century genealogist John O'Hart, the O'Neill pedigrees themselves being imperfectly preserved.

== Life ==
Possibly some time before, or around the time of her marriage to John Mór Tanister, Margery met Richard II of England when he was in Ireland, either during his 1394–1395 campaign to receive the submission of a number of the Irish princes, or later in 1399, the year in which he was deposed. She was "no doubt presented to him, as the daughter of a great northern lord", and retained a memory of his face. After she had come to reside with John in the Isles, the contemporary Scottish poet Andrew of Wyntoun tells of her recognition of a man whom she believed to be the deposed king travelling [dressed] as a poor man. Although Richard is widely believed to have starved to death in captivity in Pontefract Castle in early 1400, there are stories of his having escaped to Scotland where the Lord of the Isles, who had met Richard II in London, took him to safety. Margery vouched for the man, whether Richard II or not, and the Scots believed her. He was naturally dismissed as an impostor by Henry IV, but had a kind of career as an anti-Lancastrian figurehead anyway and died in 1419.

== Issue ==
- Donald Balloch MacDonald
- possibly Ranald Bane MacDonald
