= Battle of Inverlochy (1431) =

Battle in Highland, Scotland

Coordinates: 56°49′53″N 5°5′6″W

- Part of the Scottish clan wars
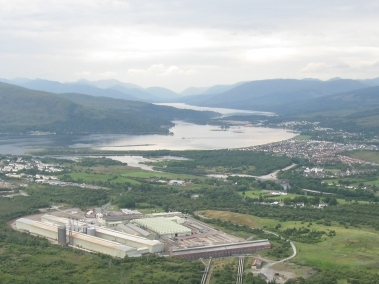
- Battlefield is the green field above the squareish central building of the aluminium factory
Date	September 1431
Location	Fort William, Scotland grid reference NN126750
Result	Lordship victory

Belligerents
Lordship of the Isles	Kingdom of Scotland

Commanders and leaders
Donald Balloch; Alasdair Carrach.	Alexander Stewart, Earl of Mar; Alan Stewart, 4th Earl of Caithness

Strength
Unknown	Unknown

Casualties and losses
30 killed	900 killed

Registered battlefield
- Official name: Battle of Inverlochy I
- Designated: 14 December 2012
- Reference no.: BTL34

The Battle of Inverlochy (1431) (Scottish Gaelic: Blàr Inbhir Lòchaidh) was fought after Alexander of Islay (Alasdair Ìle, Rìgh Innse Gall), Lord of the Isles and Earl of Ross, had been imprisoned by King James I. A force of Highlanders led by Donald Balloch, Alexander's cousin, defeated Royalist forces led by the Earls of Mar and Caithness at Inverlochy, near present-day Fort William. Over 1000 men were supposedly killed, among them the Earl of Caithness. Balloch then went on to ravage the country of Clan Cameron and Clan Chattan, clans who had been disloyal to Alexander. King James himself soon after led an army into the Highlands, and Highland forces left off.

Alexander was liberated by King James in October 1431, it is said as a part of a royal amnesty granted to several upon the birth of the king's son James II. but the timing for that doesn't fit. When King James finally set Alexander free, he was the only magnate who could offer security in the Highlands. Upon the king's murder in 1437, Alexander was again recognized as the Earl of Ross, and not only received control of Dingwall, but Inverness, too, which he would hold until at least 1447.

The pibroch The End of the Great Bridge is traditionally held to have been composed during the battle and Piobaireachd Domhnull Dubh, named for clan chief Donald Dubh Cameron, commemorates the battle.

By January 1437 Alexander was styling himself "Earl of Ross" in his charters, and this style was acknowledged in royal documents by 1439. Finally, in February 1439, Alexander was appointed Justiciar of Scotia, an office which made him the chief legal official in the Kingdom of Scotland.

== See also ==
- Battle of Lochaber (1429)
- Battle of Inverlochy (1645)

== Notes and references ==
- Bower, Walter, Scotichronicon, 1987–96.
- Brown, M., James I, 1994.
- MacDonald, Hugh, History of the MacDonalds, in Highland Papers, vol. I, 1914.
