= Alexander Carragh MacDonnell, 5th of Dunnyveg =

Scottish clan chief

Alexander Carragh MacDonnell, also spelt MacDonald, was the 5th lord of Dunnyveg, Scotland, alive c. 1480–1538.

He was the son of John Cathanach MacDonald, 4th of Dunnyveg and Cecillia Savage, daughter of the Lord of the Ardes.

After his father and brothers were executed on the Boroughmuir (now Burgh Muir) in 1499, Alexander fled to Ireland. In 1532 Alexander and a force of gallowglass fought the English in Ireland. Alexander died at Stirling while on a visit to King James V of Scotland in 1538 and is buried there.

== Family ==
By his wife, Catherine, daughter of John Macdonald of Ardnamurchan and Helen Campbell, their children were:

- Donald MacDonnell, born blind.
- James MacDonald, 6th of Dunnyveg, married Agnes, daughter of Colin Campbell, 3rd Earl of Argyll, died 5 July 1565, while imprisoned at Castle Crocke, near Strathbane, Ireland.
- Angus MacDonnell, killed during the battle of Glentasie on 2 May 1565.
- Colla MacDonnell, married Evelyn MacQuillan and died in 1558 at Kinbane Castle.
- Sorley Boy MacDonnell, died in 1590 at Dunanynie Castle, Ballycastle.
- Alistair Og MacDonnell, killed in 1566.
- Donald Gorm MacDonnell
- Brian Carrach MacDonnell, killed in 1568.
- Ranold Og MacDonnell
- Meve MacDonnell, who married Hector Maclean of Coll.
- Mary MacDonnell, who married Hector Mor Maclean of Duart.
