= Battle of Aura =

16th century Irish clan battle

Coordinates: 55°5′N 6°13′W

- Part of the Irish clan wars
Date	At some date between 11–29 April 1583
Location	Slieve-na-Aura, near Loughguile, Ireland D1327
Result	MacDonnell victory

Belligerents
MacDonnells of Antrim; MacAuleys of the Glens	MacQuillans of the Route; O'Neills of Clandeboy

Commanders and leaders
Sorley Boy MacDonnell	Rory Oge McQuillan †; Hugh MacFelim O'Neill †

Strength
Unknown	Unknown

Casualties and losses
Unknown	Unknown

The Battle of Aura (Battle of Slieve-na-Aura), was fought in the late sixteenth century between the MacDonnells, led by Sorley Boy MacDonnell, against the McQuillans and O'Neills, in which the McQuillans and O'Neills were defeated. Translated, Slieve-an-Aura means Hill of Battle – the modern spelling is Slieveanorra.

== 'Traditional' account ==
Edward McQuillan mounted an attack against the camp of Sorley Boy near Bonamargy on 4 July 1559, however, his attack was repulsed with heavy losses, including his brother Roderick McQuillan, his second in charge. The McQuillans retreated and Sorley Boy pursued them to their camp on the banks of Glenshesk River which he attacked on 5-6 July and, both forces suffered heavy losses, including McQuillan's other brother Charles McQuillan. The McQuillans retreated further and set up camp near Slieve-na-Aura. Hugh MacFelim O'Neill, Prince of the O'Neills of Clandeboy, arrived at the camp of the McQuillans with reinforcements.

During the night of 13 July 1559, the MacDonnells cut and spread rushes over the boggy terrain, to make a path across the swampy land. In the morning, a party was sent to the camp of the O'Neills. The O'Neill chief then ordered his cavalry to pursue the MacDonnells, who fled towards their own camp by way of their path. The pursuing cavalry were soon bogged down in the wet terrain and attempted a retreat, but were cut off by Sorley Boy, Hugh MacIlveal and his men. Hugh McFelim O'Neill is said to have offered MacIlveal "all the young horses, and all the fair damsels of Claneboy", as his ransom, to which MacIlveal replied, "If all the horses in Ireland were Sorley Boys, I would rather go on foot," before killing Hugh McFelim O'Neill.

The chiefs of Clan MacAuley and Clan MacPhoil, along with their forces, who were to fight on the side of the McQuillans and O'Neills, arrived during the middle of battle and became spectators. Sorley Boy MacDonnell then rode out to the chiefs of the MacAuleys and MacPhoils and persuaded them to join his ranks, to which they agreed. Their combined force then drove the McQuillans and the O'Neills to the banks of the river Aura, where they were finally defeated. Edward McQuillan also fell during the battle.

The dead were left all over Glenshesk. After the battle the MacDonnells withdrew to the mountain of Trostan, which overlooks Cushendall, and Sorley Boy MacDonnell was entertained by MacAuley, Lord of the Glens. A cairn was then erected to commemorate the place of festivities. Near the summit of the 1,530-foot (470 m) Slieve-na-Aura, two cairns were said to have marked the burying place of O'Neill and his men.

== Historical account ==
In April 1583, taking advantage of Sorley's perceived weakness through the absence of a significant number of MacDonnell warriors, who had been hired by Turlough Luineach O'Neill for a campaign in the west, the MacQuillans made their last great attempt to decisively defeat the MacDonnells and recover the Route. In alliance with Sir Hugh MacFelim "Bacach" O'Niall of Edenduffcarrig (Shane's Castle, Randalstown) and accompanied by two companies of English shot "sent from the pale" and commanded by the newly appointed Senechel of Clandeboye, Captain Thomas Chatterton, the MacQuillans launched a devastating raid on the northern glens "to follow their revenge upon the Scots".

Sorley assembled a small force which threatened the main camp of the raiders sited on a broad ridge near Slieve na Orra. The cavalry and heavy Galloglass infantry of the raiders were tricked into charging the small, apparently vulnerable, MacDonnell host across what they believed to be sound ground but which was in fact a deep bog, where they were incapacitated and decisively defeated by the lightly armed MacDonnell swordsmen and bowmen. Hugh MacFelim and Chatterton fled, but were hunted down and killed near the summit of Orra while the third commander of the raid, Rory Oge MacQuillan, sought refuge on a crannog at Loughgile, "but was pursued by one Owen Gar Magee, who swam to the island and slew him."

== Controversy over the dating of the battle ==
This action is called the battle of Slieve-an-aura in a number of accounts written since the nineteenth century and has been inaccurately dated to 1559 by a number of sources used by the "traditional" account given above, following a date popularised in Rev. George Hill's history, The MacDonnells of Antrim. The accurate date of the Battle of Orra has been preserved in the State Papers for Ireland, which, unfortunately, Hill failed to consult. A dispatch from the Lords Justice Ireland, to the Privy Council, dated 29 April 1583, records Hugh McFelim's death on a raid, "slain by the Scots".

The primary source for many of the quotes given in the traditional account is the MacDuffee Manuscript, a history compiled by a man called McDuffee, circa 1714.

== See also ==
- History of Ireland
