= Battle of Glentaisie =

Irish battle fought in the north of Ulster on 2 May 1565

Coordinates: 55°11′N 6°16′W

Battle of Glentasie
- Part of Irish Clan Wars and Scottish Clan Wars
Date	2 May 1565
Location	near Ballycastle, Ireland D0938
Result	O'Neill victory

Belligerents
Clan O'Neill of Tyrone	Clan MacDonnell of Antrim; Clan MacDonald of Dunnyveg; Clan MacLean

Commanders and leaders
Shane O'Neill	James MacDonald (DOW); Sorley Boy MacDonnell; Angus MacDonnell †

Strength
High	High

Casualties and losses
?	c. 300–400 killed

The Battle of Glentaisie, was an Irish battle fought in the north of Ulster on 2 May 1565. The result was a victory for Shane O'Neill over the Clan MacDonald of Dunnyveg. The conflict was a part of the political and military struggle, involving the English and occasionally the Scots, for control of northern Ireland. Although the MacDonalds were a Scottish family, based principally on the island of Islay in the Hebrides, they had long been associated with the Gaelic polity rather than the Kingdom of Scotland.

== Background ==
The settlement of the Glynnes of Antrim and the north coast of Antrim by the MacDonnells of Dunnyveg and affiliated families had been worrying the English authorities since the later years of King Henry VIII of England as the primary allegiance of the MacDonnells was to the Scottish crown. Shane's O'Neill's alliance with the MacDonnells had provided him with the army of redshanks that permitted him to challenge his father Conn Bacach, Earl of Tyrone during the 1550s.

Lord Deputy Thomas Radclyffe, Earl of Sussex had led a well equipped expedition by land and sea to destroy the MacDonnell settlements in 1558. Sussex's conspicuous lack of success had encouraged the English to make an uneasy truce with the MacDonnells in 1560 in order to detach them from their alliance with Shane. During this truce an increased sense of security in their new territories encouraged the MacDonnells to undertake a number of building projects such as the rebuilding of James MacDonnell of Dunnyveg's castle of Red Bay which commanded the strategically important landing beach at Glenariffe (Waterfoot).

During 1564–5 the expansion of MacDonnell influence to Lecale threatened to bring much of the eastern coastline of Ulster directly under their control. Much of the province of Ulster had now come under Shane's authority in the period following his return from his visit to London. The reduction of MacDonnell power would remove a growing threat that the English had already begun to exploit against him before his London visit. It would also serve to underline the failure of Sussex in his undertaking of the same task seven years earlier, and dramatically display to Queen Elizabeth I of England just how useful her recognition of Shane's hegemony in Ulster could be to her.

== Campaign ==
Shane assembled his host for the attack on the MacDonnells at the tower house of Feadan, at Fathom Mountain, near Newry. Traditionally, he "kept Easter" at Feadan, and an assembly of his clan would be unremarked until its size drew notice. The final size of his army was about 2,000 men. Its composition probably followed the numbers he fielded the following year:

- 200 horse with 200 horse boys (squires)
- 300 shot (Culvers)
- 120 longbow men Scots (led by Brian Carrach MacDonnell, a younger brother of James MacDonald, 6th of Dunnyveg and Sorley Boy)
- 40 Scots 'Redshank' swordsmen (led by Brian Carragh MacDonnell)
- 250 Galloglass
- 550 Kernagh armed with short throwing darts and short swords or dirks.
- 290 heavy infantry contact foot soldiers (100/200)
- 200 cavalry (100/200)

The Macdonnells could expect Shane's sizeable host to take some weeks to cross from south down into their territory on the Antrim coast. The lord of Dunnyveg, and of the Route and Glynnes, James MacDonald, 6th of Dunnyveg, and his brothers started gathering as many warriors in the Highlands and Islands as they could muster. However, Shane advanced with unprecedented speed, cutting a road '6 marching men wide' in a single week through the dense woodland of the forest of Killultagh, "Coil Ultagh, the great wood of Ulster," situated along the shores of Lough Neigh between modern Lurgan and Aldergrove. Within a week the hosting arrived at Edenduffcarrick, the principal castle of the Clandeboye O'Neills (modern Shane's Castle near Antrim town) where Shane fortified an old rath at Gallanagh while awaiting the hosting of the Clandeboye O'Neills.

Sorley Boy MacDonnell gathered a small holding force at a forward base at 'Cloughdonaghy" (modern Clough, in Antrim). He attempted to stop Shane's advancing army at Knockboy, a wooded pass in the hills above Broughshane. Sorley was attempting to gain time for his brothers to gather a sizeable hosting from amongst their kindred and supporters in the Highlands and Islands, and to transport the host into the Glens by sea.

Shane swept Sorley's ambush away, took Clough and sent a force of cavalry to seize James of Dunnyveg's recently constructed Castle at Red Bay. They surprised the garrison of Red Bay Castle, set it alight and 'brake it down to the ground' before James MacDonald, 6th of Dunnyveg's host could land at the adjacent beach at Waterfoot. With the landing beaches at Waterfoot and by Cushendall now controlled by Shane's army, the first few hundreds of MacDonnells and their MacLean allies under James and Angus MacDonnell were compelled to land further north. They landed at Ballycastle beach to await the locally raised MacDonnnell host that Sorley Boy now led over the Cary Mountains, traditionally by the old MacDonnell road, an early road that runs to the west of the modern Cushendun/Ballycastle road. Their plan was to await the arrival of their brother Alexander, the MacDonnell seneschal of Cantyre, who was assembling a second host composed from late comers to James of Dunnyveg's hosting.

== Battle ==
Shane O'Neill did not permit the MacDonnells any time for their reinforcement to arrive. His advance guard continued to press the retreating MacDonnell host, who fell back from the beach through Ballycastle. They were driven past the area of the modern Diamond and well away from the river Tow, denying them the necessary water supply for a sizeable host.

Both armies set up camp for the night. Shane's army occupied land at the centre of modern Ballycastle, between the modern Diamond and the river Tow, giving them full access to water. The combined MacDonnell army of around five hundred men occupied the exposed higher ground at Ramon, (the ridge at the head of modern Castle Street, Ballycastle, where the Presbyterian Church now stands) with only a small well for their needs.

At very first light, about 3:30-4:00am, Shane attacked uphill with a sudden onslaught led by his heavy Galloglass infantry. By forgoing the customary exchange of spears, darts, and arrows by the light infantry kernagh and Scots archers that customarily preceded the usually decisive deployment of the Galloglass corrughadh, or battalions, Shane surprised the MacDonnell host. The MacDonnell leaders tried to rally their men, but after a violent interlude of some confusion, they broke and fled over Knocklayd mountain in the direction of Glenshesk, heading back towards the beach at Cushendun. James of Dunnyveg was seriously wounded in the early fighting and his brother Angus MacDonnell killed, reputedly later in the rout while attempting a holding action at a standing stone sited just below modern Breen wood.

Shane's secretary, Gerrot Flemming writes in the battle's aftermath:

"We advanced upon them drawen up in battle array, and the fight was furiously maintained on both sides, but God, best and greatest of his mere grace, gave us victory against them. James and Somerlaide were taken prisoners, and Angus, the contentious slain. John Roe slain, together with two Scots chiefs, namely the son of MacLeod (sisters son to James & Sorley) and the son of the laird of Carrick–na skaith (Mac Neill of Carsay in Kantire) Great numbers killed, amounting to 6/700, few escaped who were not taken or slain."

Traditionally, the attempt to flee by the old mountain road between Greenan and Ballypatrick Forest in an attempt to reach a possible landing place for their Birlins at Cushendun beach was finally stopped at a hollow at Legacapple. Sorley Boy and James were both taken prisoner. James died of his wounds two months later at Castle Crocke, near Strabane. Their brother Alistair Og MacDonnell, had landed at Rathlin, with the final levies raised in the Highlands and Islands, reputed to be nine hundred men. However, in the immediate aftermath of Shane's decisive victory, Alistair could achieve nothing without a base on the mainland. Shane marched on along the north coast to mop up the MacDonnell garrisons and deny Alistair any foothold from which to launch a MacDonnell recovery. Dunseverick and Dunluce fell within a few days, and Alistair returned to Scotland.

== Aftermath ==
Brian Carrach MacDonnell, the younger brother of James and Sorley, gained from the eclipse of his older brothers in the year following Glentaisie. His alliance with Shane made him the most powerful MacDonnell in the Glens and Route until Shane's assassination by his nephews in 1567, and his own death the following year. The death of James of Dunnyveg in captivity at Castle Crocke on 5 July 1565, within months of the battle, left the lordship of the Glens nominally in the hands of his sons Archibald MacDonald, 7th of Dunnyveg and Angus MacDonald, later 8th of Dunnyveg, Sorley's nephews. Sorley Boy, previously simply James's Seneschal of the Glynnes and Route, acquired considerable authority as the last remaining MacDonnell of his generation still resident in Antrim in the years after 1567. After leading a protracted twenty-year struggle to defend the Glens and Route against the O’Neills of Clandeboye, the MacQuillans and the English, Sorley had his authority confirmed with an unexpectedly decisive victory at the battle of Orra in 1583. Shane O'Neill's defeat of the MacDonnells at Glentaisie had cleared the way for the elevation of Sorley and his descendants by removing his eldest brother James of Dunnyveg, proper inheritor of the lordship of the Glynnes and Route and claimant to the prestigious lost title of "Lord of the Isles."

Sorley Boy successfully followed Shane's political example and rejected questionable English overtures until he was successful enough to press his demands his own terms. His nephews, James of Dunnyveg's received recognition of Lordship of the Glens from the Lord Deputy, Sir John Perrot, in 1584. Sorley Boy held out longer and received recognition for his claim to Ballycastle and the Route in 1586.

== See also ==
- List of Irish battles

== Bibliography ==
- Brady, C., The Killing of Shane O'Neill: Some new Evidence, in The Irish Sword, vol. 15, 1982–3.
- Breathnach, C., The Murder of Shane O'Neill, in Eriu vol. 53 1992.
- Hill, G., Shane O'Neill's Expedition against the Antrim Scots, 1565, in The Ulster Journal of Archaeology, vol. 9, 1861.
- Hill, G., An Historical Account of the MacDonnells of Antrim, 1873.
- Hill, J. M., Shane O'Neill's Campaign against the Macdonnells of Antrim, 1564-5, in The Irish Sword. vol. 18, 1991.
- Hill, J. M., Fire and Sword. Sorley Boy MacDonnell and the Rise of Clan Iain Mor, 1993.
- Webb, M., The Clan MacQuillin of Antrim, in the Ulster Journal of Archaeology, vol. 8, 1860.
