= Clan MacAuley of the Glens =

Clan MacAuley of the Glens was a small Irish clan that descend from south-western Scotland, who originally come over to Ulster to serve as galloglass mercenaries. They held lands in the Glens of Antrim in modern County Antrim and the chief was at one time known as Lord of the Glens. In 1559, the clan participated in the Battle of Aura, in which the McQuillans were defeated by the MacDonnells. The MacAuleys and MacPhoils arrived midway through the battle, and had planned on siding with the McQuillans and O'Neills, but the chief of the clan was persuaded by Sorley Boy MacDonnell to join forces with the MacDonnells.
