= Ould Lammas Fair =

Traditional annual fair held in Ballycastle in Northern Ireland

Coordinates: 55.201°N 6.252°W

Lammas Fair Office in Ballycastle Museum

The Ould Lammas Fair is a traditional fair held in Ballycastle, County Antrim, Northern Ireland, every year on the last Monday and Tuesday of August. It is associated with the Lammas harvest festival.

The fair has been running for nearly 400 years, with records dating back to the 17th century but having origins possibly much older. Traditionally most of the crowds attending the fair would have been traders from throughout Ireland and from Kintyre, Islay, Jura and elsewhere along the Scottish coast. It is widely considered to be the oldest fair in Ireland.

Various goods are traditionally sold at the fair. These include livestock and traditional foods such as yellowman, which is a local variant of honeycomb, and dulse, which is a type of edible seaweed.

A ballad, The Ould Lammas Fair in Ballycastle O, was written by local shopkeeper and bog oak carver John Henry MacAuley and enhanced the local fame of the fair. MacAuley was also a well known fiddler, but died in 1937 before his song became famous.

== History ==
=== Origins ===
Widely considered to be one of the oldest annual fairs in Ireland, The Ould Lammas Fair has been running for over 400 years with records dating back to the 17th century. However the origins of the festival may go back further. The ruined fortress of Dunaneeny Castle which overlooks the harbour is said to be where the fair first began. In 1571 the local chieftain Sorley Boy MacDonnell ordered the celebration of public games for the coming of age of his nephew Gillaspick MacDonnell. The Lammas Fair can trace its origins to these games and the sheep markets held in the area. The Irish language name of the castle, Dún an Aonaigh translates as "fort of the assembly" or "fort of the fair" - further alluding to the origins of Ballycastle's Ould Lammas Fair.

In 1606 Randall MacDonnell obtained a charter entitling him to hold six fairs annually at Dunaneeny Castle, one of which was to be the last Tuesday in August - which coincides with the modern date of The Ould Lammas Fair. Following the decline of Dunaneeny Castle and the MacDonnells of Antrim moving their primary base to Dunluce Castle and eventually Glenarm Castle, its likely that this is when the fair moved to its more traditional location of being centred around The Diamond as well as along Castle Street, Ann Street and Quay Road.

Its possible that the fair can trace its origins back even further to the ancient Celtic festival of Lughnasadh, which celebrates the beginning of the harvest season.

=== The Troubles ===
On 28 August 2001 a Royal Ulster Constabulary officer discovered a large incendiary bomb in the centre of Ballycastle whilst the fair was running. After the area was cleared British Army bomb disposal experts defused the device. The attempted attack was initially claimed by the Red Hand Defenders. However, the RUC later suggested that it was carried out by the Ulster Volunteer Force.

=== COVID-19 pandemic ===
The 2020 and 2021 editions of The Ould Lammas Fair were cancelled due to the COVID-19 pandemic. The fair had been held without interruption for nearly four centuries, including through both world wars.

== "The Ould Lammas Fair" song ==
One of the most famous songs hailing from the local area is "The Ould Lammas Fair" written by John Henry MacAulay, a shopkeeper in the town and a well known fiddler who died in 1937 before his song gained the fame that it has today. A line in his song; “There’s a neat little cabin on the slopes of fair Knocklayde” is thought to refer to the cottage he grew up in.

Lyrics:

Verse

At the Ould Lammas Fair in Ballycastle long ago, I met a pretty colleen who set me heart a-glow, She was smiling at her daddy buying lambs from Paddy Roe, At the Ould Lammas Fair in Ballycastle-O. Sure I seen her home that night, When the moon was shining bright, From the ould Lammas Fair in Ballycastle-O.

Chorus

At the ould Lammas Fair, boys were you ever there? Were you ever at the Fair In Ballycastle-O? Did you treat your Mary Ann to some Dulse and Yellow Man? At the ould Lammas Fair in Ballycastle-O.

Verse

In Flander’s fields afar while resting from the War, We drank Bon Sante to the Flemish lassies O. But the scene that haunts my memory is kissing Mary Ann, Her pouting lips all sticky from eating Yellow Man, As we passed the silver Margy and we strolled along the strand, From the ould Lammas Fair in Ballycastle-O.

Chorus

Verse

There’s a neat little cabin on the slopes of fair Knocklayde, It’s lit by love and sunshine where the heather honey’s made, With the bees ever humming and the children’s joyous call, Resounds across the valley as the shadows fall. Sure I take my fiddle down and my Mary smiling there, Brings back a happy mem’ry of the Lammas Fair.

Chorus

== Association with the Puck Fair ==
Another fair which contends for the title of the oldest annually held fair in Ireland is The Puck Fair which is held in Killorglin, County Kerry. One of the traditions of the Puck Fair is the crowning of King Puck, a wild goat typically captured from MacGillycuddy's Reeks and brought back to the town to be crowned. In 1979 King Puck was flown to Belfast in order to attend the Ould Lammas Fair in Ballycastle.

Previously in the 1960s a delegation from Ballycastle made the journey to Killorglin as guests of the fair committee there and Killorglin people reciprocated later in the month. The delegation from Ballycastle brought gifts of yellow man and a recording of the iconic song about the Ould Lammas Fair, with the Killorglin delegation reciprocating by bringing King Puck to Ballycastle. According to local story the plan was for the goat to lead a parade and then be freed at Murlough Bay or nearby Fair Head, where lots of mountain goats roam. However when the delegation stopped at a pub in Ballyvoy, on the road to Fair Head, King Puck escaped with locals saying he became a menace causing damage throughout the area around Ballyvoy village. The story goes that no one could catch him, though someone tried to shoot him, leaving a bullet mark on one of his horns.
