= Dunaneeny Castle =

Ruin in County Antrim, Northern Ireland

- Dún an Aonaigh
- near Ballycastle, County Antrim, Northern Ireland

Site information
- Condition: Ruin

Location
- Coordinates: 55.211389°N 6.250278°W

Dunaneeny Castle (or Dunineny Castle, Irish Dún an Aonaigh) is a ruined castle on the outskirts of Ballycastle in County Antrim, Northern Ireland. The castle was home to the chiefs of Clan MacDonald of Dunnyveg and later the MacDonnells of Antrim. The castle is purported to be the birthplace of Gaelic chief Sorley Boy MacDonnell.

== History ==
Established by Alexander MacDonnell, Dunaneeny held a commanding position overlooking Port Brittas (Ballycastle Bay) in which galleys brought over from Kintyre and the Isles would shelter. Local tradition suggests that a castle may have been first built on the site by the O'Carrol's, an old Irish family who previously lived in the area before the MacDonnell's. Excavations of the site have revealed a much more complex history to the site pre-dating the castle, with evidence to suggest that it may have been inhabited as a late prehistoric or protohistoric promontory fort.

Ballycastle's famous Ould Lammas Fair is said to have started in the grounds around Dunaneeny Castle, now known as Castle Head. In 1571 Sorley Boy MacDonnell ordered the celebration of public games for the coming of age of his nephew Gillaspick MacDonnell. Bullfighting was one of the events in which Gillaspick tried but was fatally wounded after being gored by the bull. The Lammas Fair can trace its origins to these games and the sheep markets held in the area. The Irish language name of the castle, Dún an Aonaigh translates as "fort of the assembly" or "fort of the fair" - further alluding to the origins of Ballycastle's Ould Lammas Fair.

According to letters written by the Earl of Essex to Queen Elizabeth I's secretary and spymaster Francis Walsingham, it was from the cliffs at Dunaneeny Castle on the Irish mainland that Sorley Boy MacDonnell helplessly watched the Rathlin Island massacre. According to the Earl of Essex he boasted that Sorley Boy watched helplessly from the mainland and was "like to run mad from sorrow".

Sorley Boy MacDonnell later died at the castle in 1590, with tradition telling stories of a funeral procession carrying the chieftain from Dunaneeny, through the town to his final resting place at Bonamargy Friary.

Shortly after 1600, Sorley Boy's son Randall MacDonnell rebuilt parts of the castle along with substantial structures inside the walls that were built in the fashionable English timber-frame technique of the period.

== Present Day ==
Dunaneeny Castle is currently listed as a scheduled protected monument by the Northern Ireland Department for Communities. The remains of the castle is located on the cliffs overlooking Ballycastle Bay, behind a caravan park, on an almost triangular headland enclosed by a deep rock-cut ditch. There are remains of the gatehouse along with sections of surviving walls, roughly 2 metres high and 1 metre thick in places, with traces of two other structures within the interior of the site.
