= Corkey =

Village in County Antrim, Northern Ireland

Coordinates: 55.061°N 6.306°W

Corkey: Irish: Corcaigh
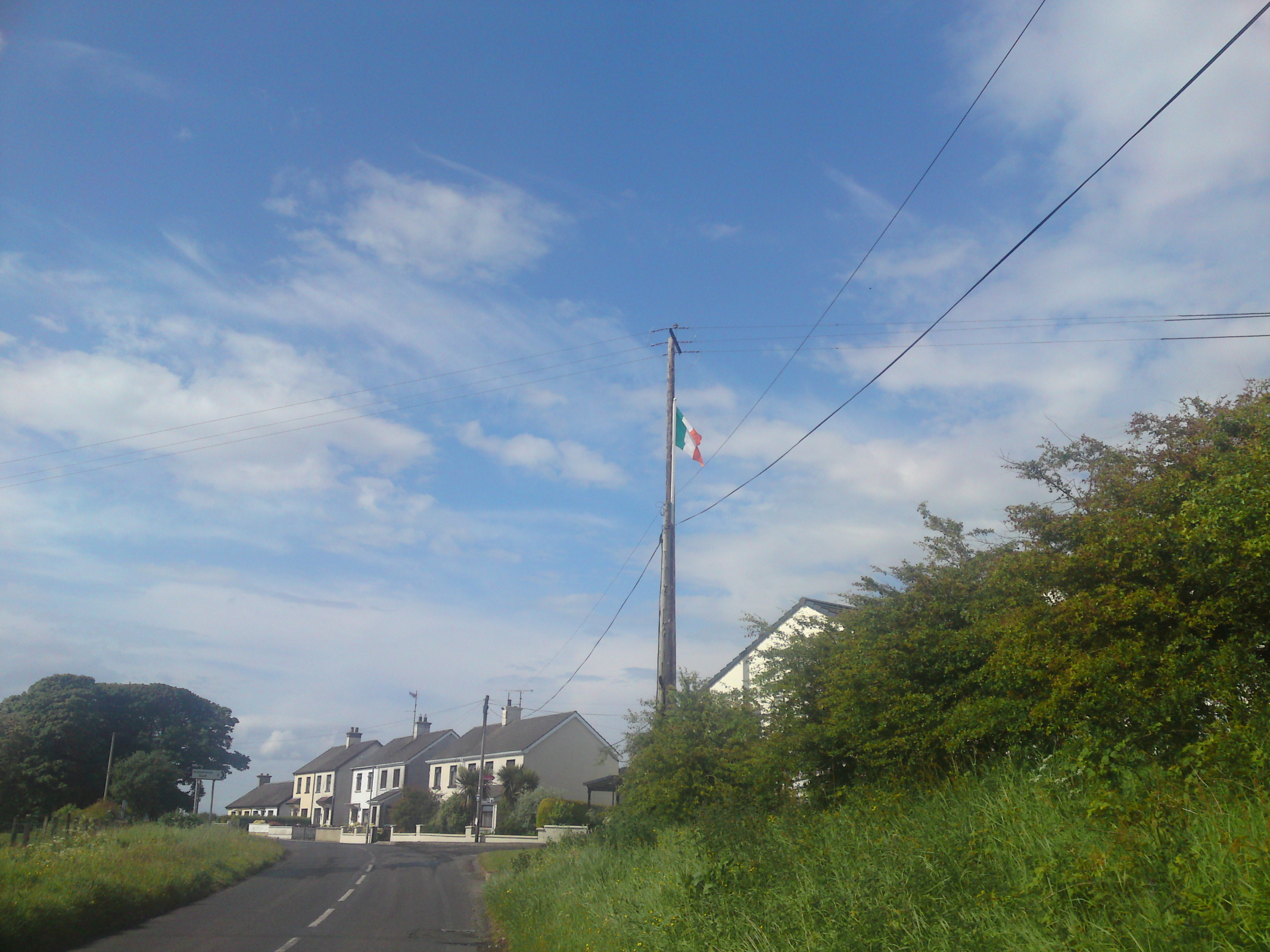
- Corkey

- Location within Northern Ireland
- Population: 162 (2021 census)
- Irish grid reference: D082250
  - Belfast: 43 mi (69 km)
- District: Ballymoney
- County: County Antrim
- Country: Northern Ireland
- Sovereign state: United Kingdom
- Post town: BALLYMENA
- Postcode district: BT44
- Dialling code: 028, +44 28
- UK Parliament: North Antrim
- NI Assembly: North Antrim

Corkey or Corky is a small village in County Antrim, Northern Ireland. Located 11 miles east of Ballymoney, it is within the Ballymoney Borough Council area, and is at the edge of the Glens of Antrim. The villages of Loughguile and Cloughmills are nearby. It had a population of 162 people in the 2021 census.

The Scottish renewable energy company Scottish Power Renewables operate a ten-windmill wind farm in Corkey. The wind farm is on Slievenahanagh mountain. Local company W & J Taggart own and run Corkey quarry, supplying stones to local building contractors.

Altnahinch Dam and Slieveanorra Forest are outside Corkey.

The local school is St Anne's Primary School.

== See also ==
- List of towns and villages in Northern Ireland
