= Yellowman (candy) =

Bagged chewy confectionary from Northern Ireland

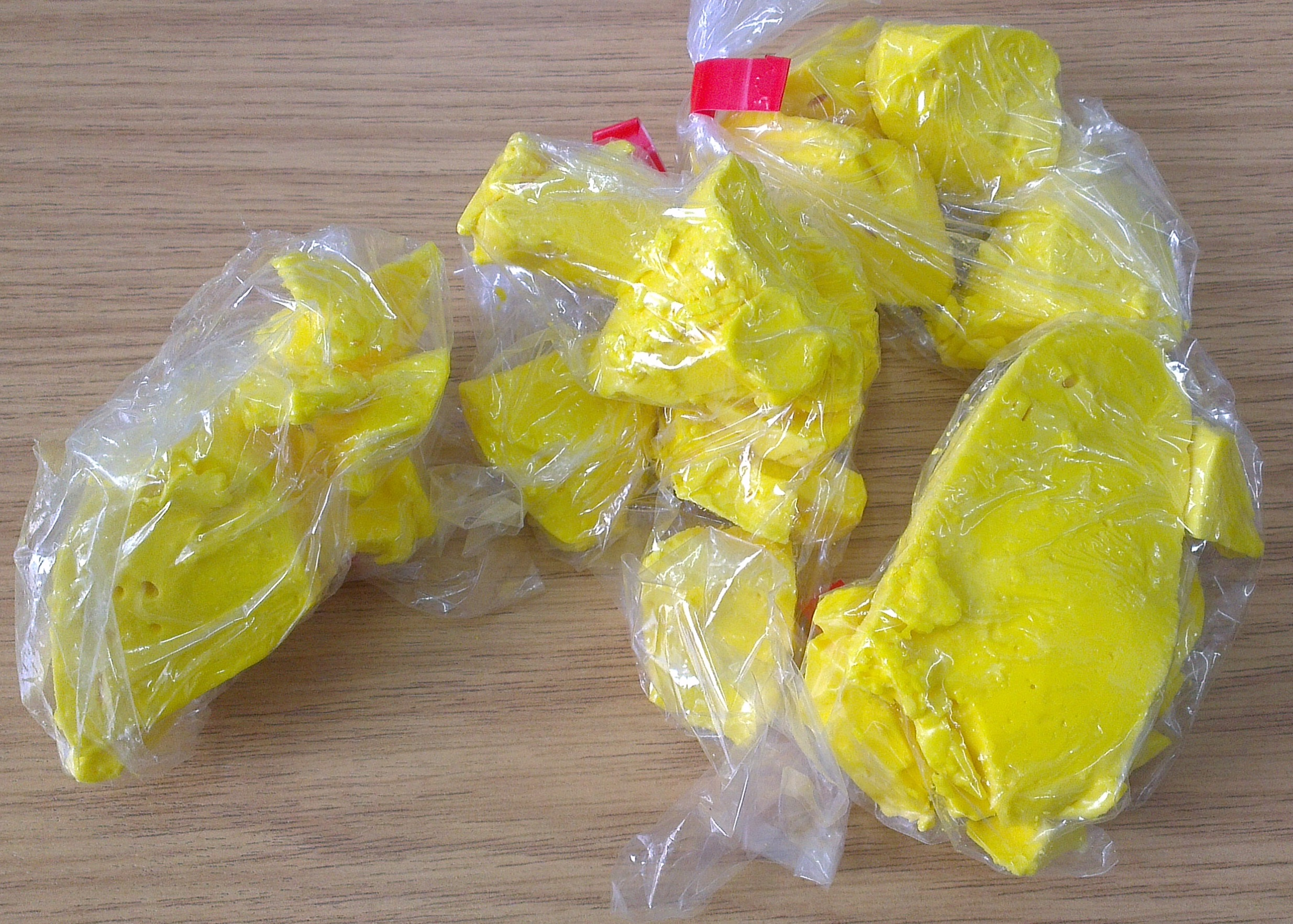
Small bagged portions of Yellowman.

Yellowman or yellaman is a chewy, toffee-textured confectionery produced in Northern Ireland. Yellowman is similar to honeycomb toffee, except that the more solid 'rind' usually consists of at least half the quantity. The rind is hard, having a similar consistency to rock.

Yellowman needs to be heated to high temperatures to get the golden syrup and sugar mixture to reach the ‘hard-crack’ (149 °C/300 °F), the temperature at which boiled sugar becomes brittle when cooled. It will also only acquire its bubbly and crunchy consistency when a reaction occurs between the vinegar and the baking soda, which vigorously adds carbon dioxide gas throughout the mixture.

Yellowman is sold in non-standard blocks and chips and is particularly associated with the Ould Lammas Fair in Ballycastle, County Antrim, where it is sold along with other confectionery and, often, dulse.

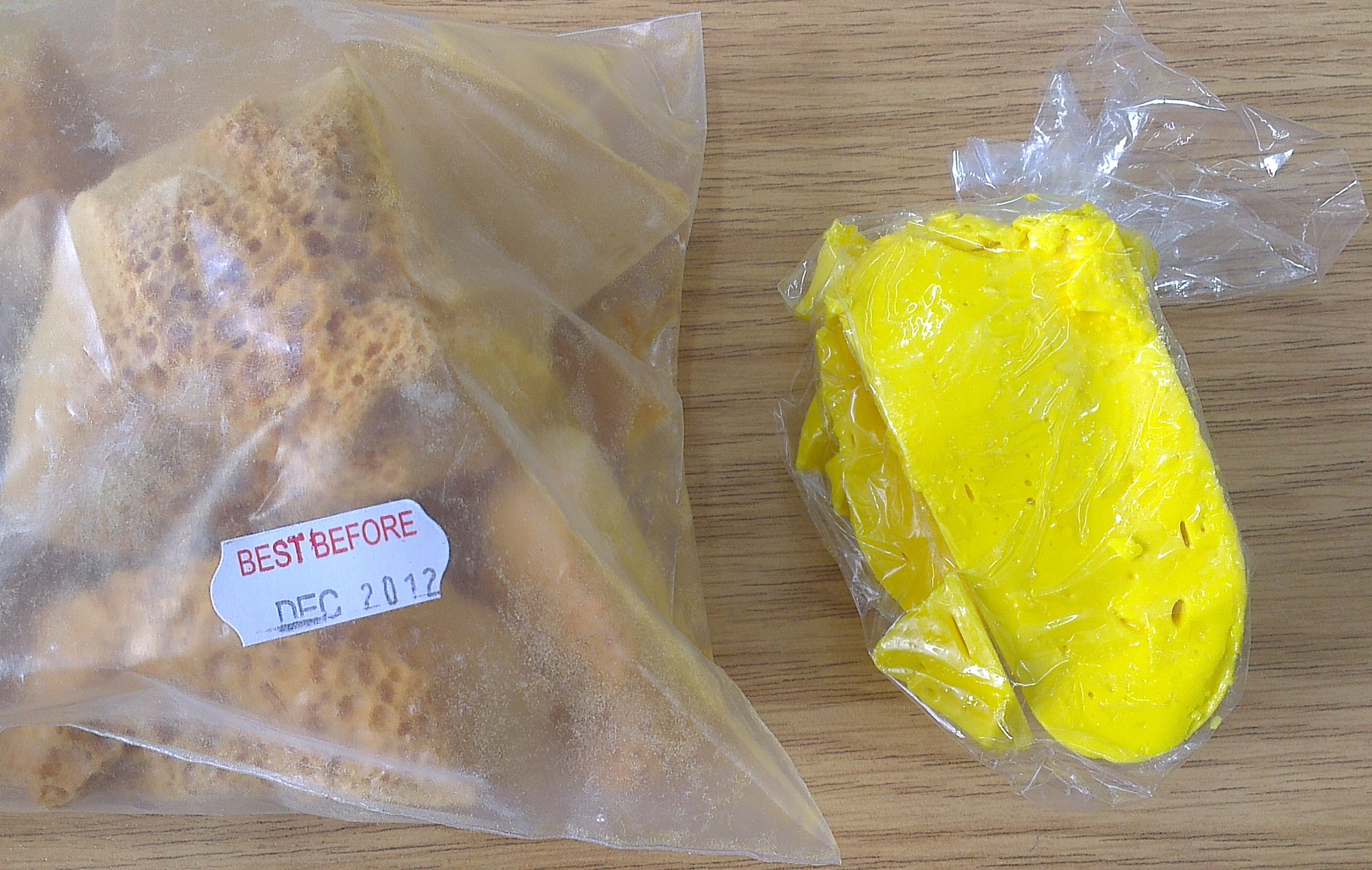
A comparative shot of yellowman and traditional honeycomb (left), both purchased at Lammas Fair, 2012.

== See also ==
- Northern Irish cuisine
