= Kinbane Castle =

Castle in County Antrim, Northern Ireland

- County Antrim, Northern Ireland
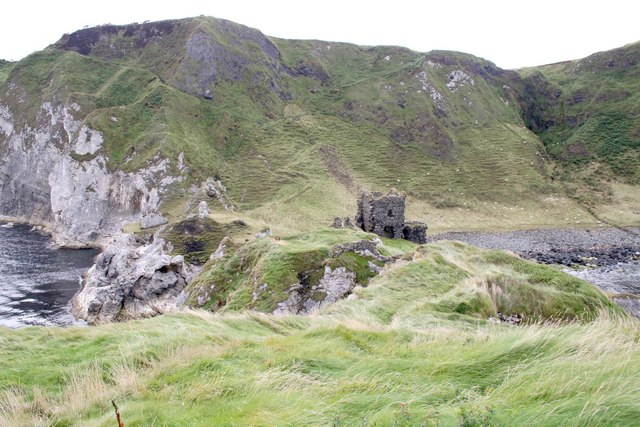

Site information
- Condition: Ruin

Location
- Coordinates: 55.229167°N 6.291389°W

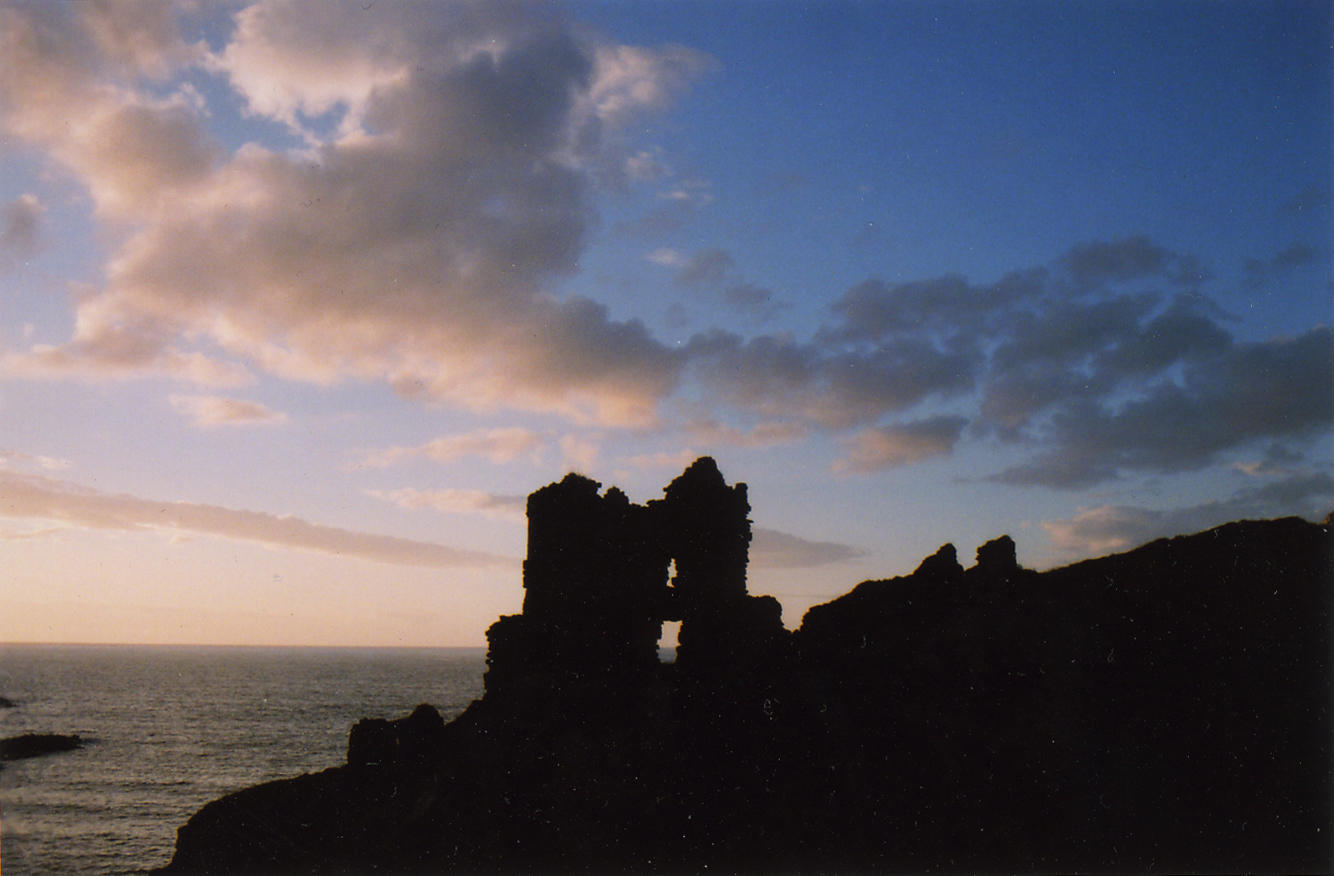
Kinbane Castle (dusk)

Kinbane Castle (Caisleán Ceinn Bán, White Head Castle, Kenbane/Kenbaan Castle) is located in County Antrim, Northern Ireland, on a headland between Ballycastle and Ballintoy. The name comes from the Irish for "white head", referring to the limestone of the promontory. Nowadays, the castle is largely destroyed. Kinbane Castle is a State Care Historic Monument sited in the townland of Cregganboy, in Moyle District Council area, at grid ref: D0876 4383. The area surrounding Kinbane Castle is a Scheduled Historic Monument, grid ref: D0879 4381. The site also has views of Rathlin Island and Dunagregor Iron Age fort.

== History ==
In 1547, a two-storey castle was built at the headland by Colla MacDonnell. The castle was damaged and partly destroyed due to English sieges under Sir James Croft in the 1550s and rebuilt afterwards. Colla MacDonnell died at the castle in 1558, and his son Gillaspick MacDonnell subsequently inherited it.

The hollow below the castle is known as Lag na Sassenach (Hollow of the English) and it is alleged that a troop of English soldiers besieging the castle were surrounded and killed there during the 16th century.

Sorley Boy MacDonnell, brother of Colla, later acquired the castle when trading property with Gillaspick. He later handed it to the MacAlisters because of their loyalty. The castle remained in the possession of the descendants of the MacAlisters of Kenbane until the 18th century.

== See also ==
- Castles in Northern Ireland
