= Altnahinch Dam =

Dam in County Antrim, Northern Ireland

Coordinates: 55.04499°N 6.24521°W

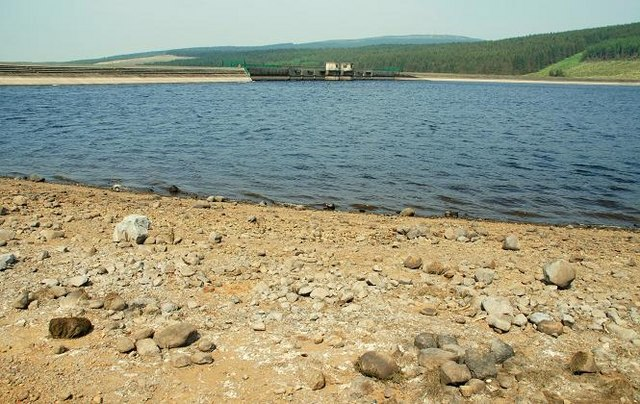
- Interactive map of Altnahinch Dam
- Country: Northern Ireland
- Location: Loughguile, County Antrim

Altnahinch Dam is a large dam located near Loughguile, County Antrim, Northern Ireland. It is situated on the edge of Slieveanorra Forest in the southern uplands of Glenbush and was constructed in 1967 using stone quarried from the newly founded Corkey Quarry almost 3 miles away. The reservoir is fed from a number of tributaries in the greater Glenbush area, Altnahinch Burn and more famously the River Bush itself which flows from the top of Glenbush, through the reservoir and eventually into the sea at Portballintrae.

A little known fact is that there are 15 road Bridge crossings over the River Bush from it birthplace in Glenbush above the Altnahinch Reservoir and the point where it meets the sea in Bushmills.

== Angling ==
Altnahinch Dam is also known locally as an excellent fishing location as the reservoir is stocked with native brown trout and rainbow trout.

== Incidents ==
In 2012 it was reported that lamb and cattle carcasses were being dumped close to the dam.
