= Slieveanorra Forest =

Natural area in Northern Ireland

Coordinates: 55°02′33″N 6°12′42″W

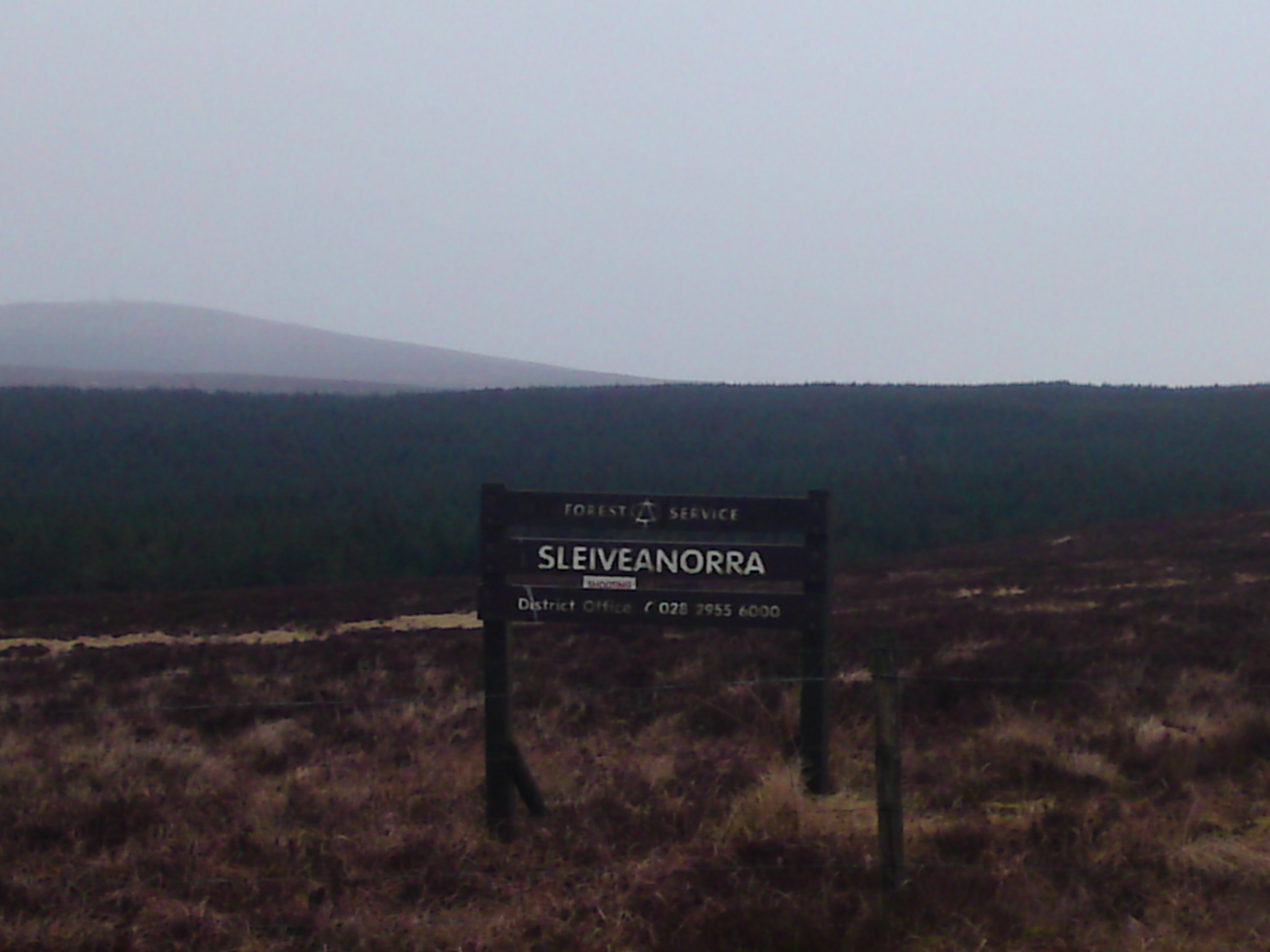

Slieveanorra Forest is situated in the rural north of County Antrim, Northern Ireland, near the villages of Corkey and Newtown Crommelin. The forest is a vast conifer forest, and the summit of Orra Mountain offers panoramic views. The forest is a working forest, and there are many types of plant and wildlife in the area. The forest has a memorial at the site of a 1942 airplane crash that killed ten people.

== Forest ==
Slieveanorra Forest is a vast conifer forest and offers panoramic views. Altnahinch Dam is located on the edge of the forest and many tourists visit the area during the summer. Many types of animal and plant life reside in the area, including crossbills, frogs, foxes and a variety of damselflies and dragonflies. The forest is named after Slieveanorra [Sliabh an Earra, 'mountain of the tail/ridge']. The Battle of Aura took place on the surrounding mountain Slieve-na-Aura.

From the forest, walkers can access the summit of Orra Mountain, which affords panoramic views of the area, and on a clear day the Hebrides off the Scottish coast and the Mourne Mountains in south Down are both visible. The forest includes a designated area of special scientific interest (ASSI).

== Access ==
The forest is accessed from the Glenaan Road, off the A2 coastal route from Cushendall town. There is very limited parking at the entranceways, provided by two laybys.

== 1942 airplane crash ==
In October 1942, a U.S. Air Force B17 Flying Fortress bomber crashed into a mountain beside the forest. The crash killed eight of the ten personnel on board. A memorial board records the event.

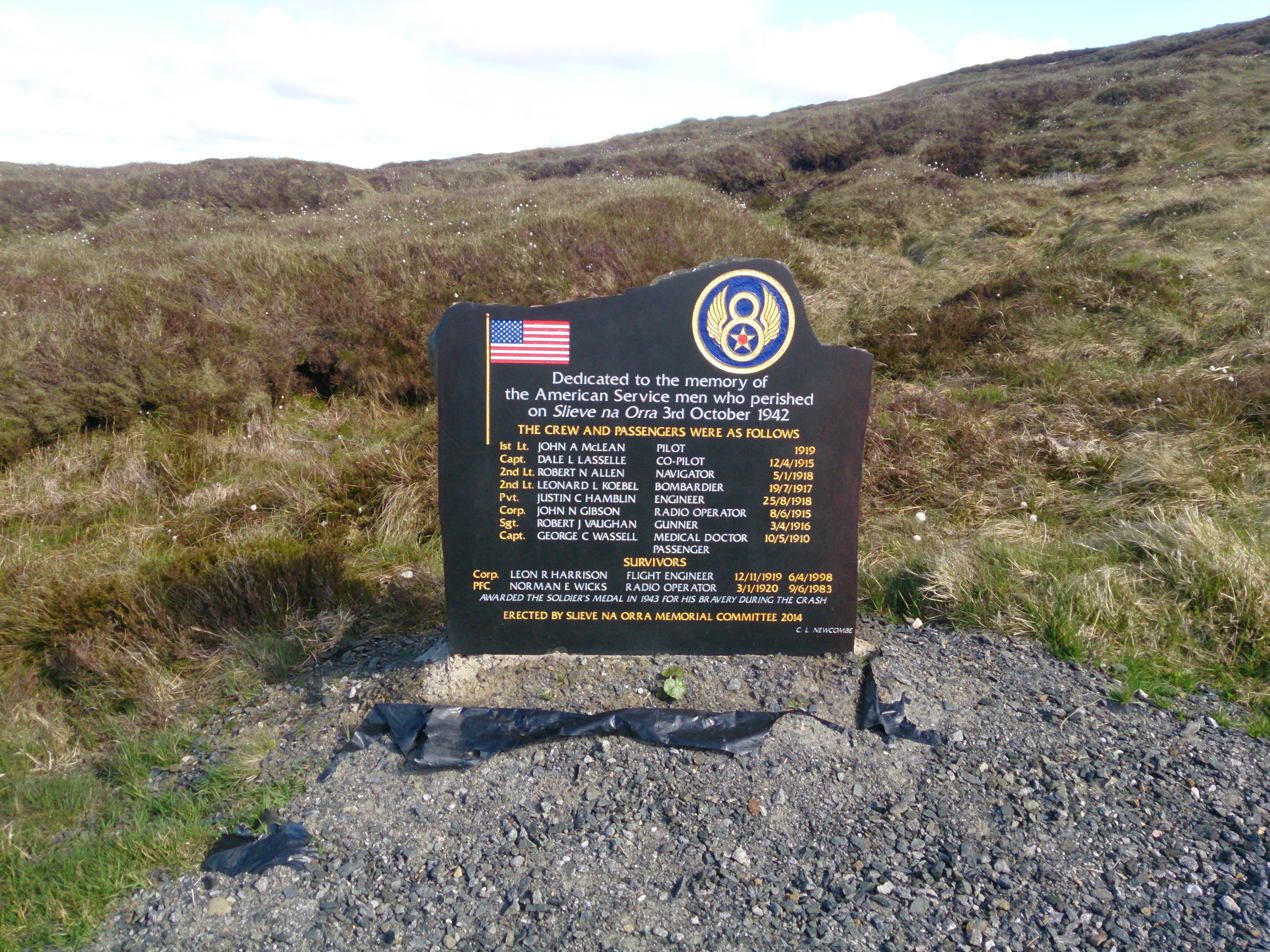
Memorial to the American servicemen
