= Loughlynch =

- townland
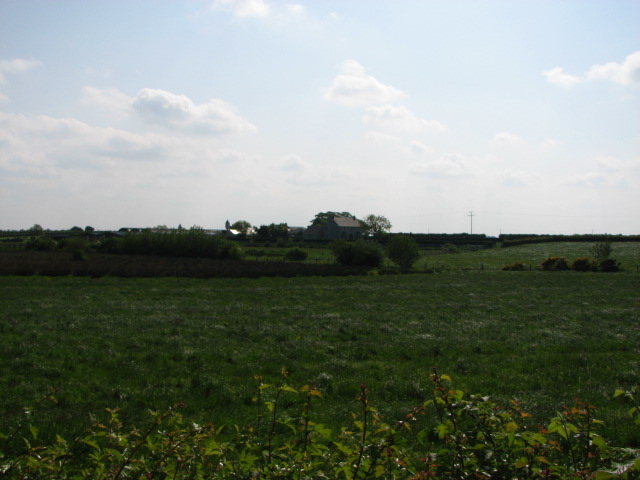
- Farm in Loughlynch

- Location within the United Kingdom
- Coordinates: 55°10′00″N 6°26′33″W

Loughlynch or Lough Lynch is a townland in the parish of Billy, County Antrim, Northern Ireland. It lies about 3½ miles south-east of Bushmills and was once the site of a lake.

Gillaspick MacDonnell's widow, according to tradition, gave birth to Coll MacGillaspick (Coll Ciotach) upon Glasineerin Island on Lough Lynch.
