= Ballycastle Castle =

Former castle in County Antrim, Northern Ireland

Ballycastle Castle was a castle located at Ballycastle in County Antrim in Northern Ireland.

== History ==
The castle existed during the time of John Mór Tanister, who died in 1427, and was rebuilt by Sorley Boy MacDonnell in 1564. In 1565, the castle was occupied by Shane O'Neill. The castle was removed by Sir Randal MacDonnell, 1st Earl of Antrim in the 17th century. Another castle was erected in 1625 by Sir Randal McDonnell, Earl of Antrim.

During the Irish Confederate Wars, the castle was seized by Scottish troops in 1642 and later occupied by Cromwellian forces. The castle was returned to Alexander MacDonnell, 3rd Earl of Antrim in 1665. However, the castle fell into ruins and was removed in 1856 by Charles Kirkpatrick, of Whitehall.
