= Angus MacDonnell =

Angus MacDonnell (Irish: Aonghas Uaimhreach, English: Angus the Haughty) was a Scottish-Gaelic lord. He died in 1565.

He was a son of Alexander MacDonnell, Lord of Islay and Kintyre (Cantire), and Catherine, daughter of the Lord of Ardnamurchan. He was killed during the battle of Glentasie on 2 May 1565.

He had the following:

- Ranald, died in 1595 at the Route, Ireland, and was buried at Bonamargy Friary.
- Alexander, who had a son, Ranald Og, who fought with Alasdair Mac Colla during the War of the Three Kingdoms.
