= Christopher Fleming, 17th Baron Slane =

Irish peer

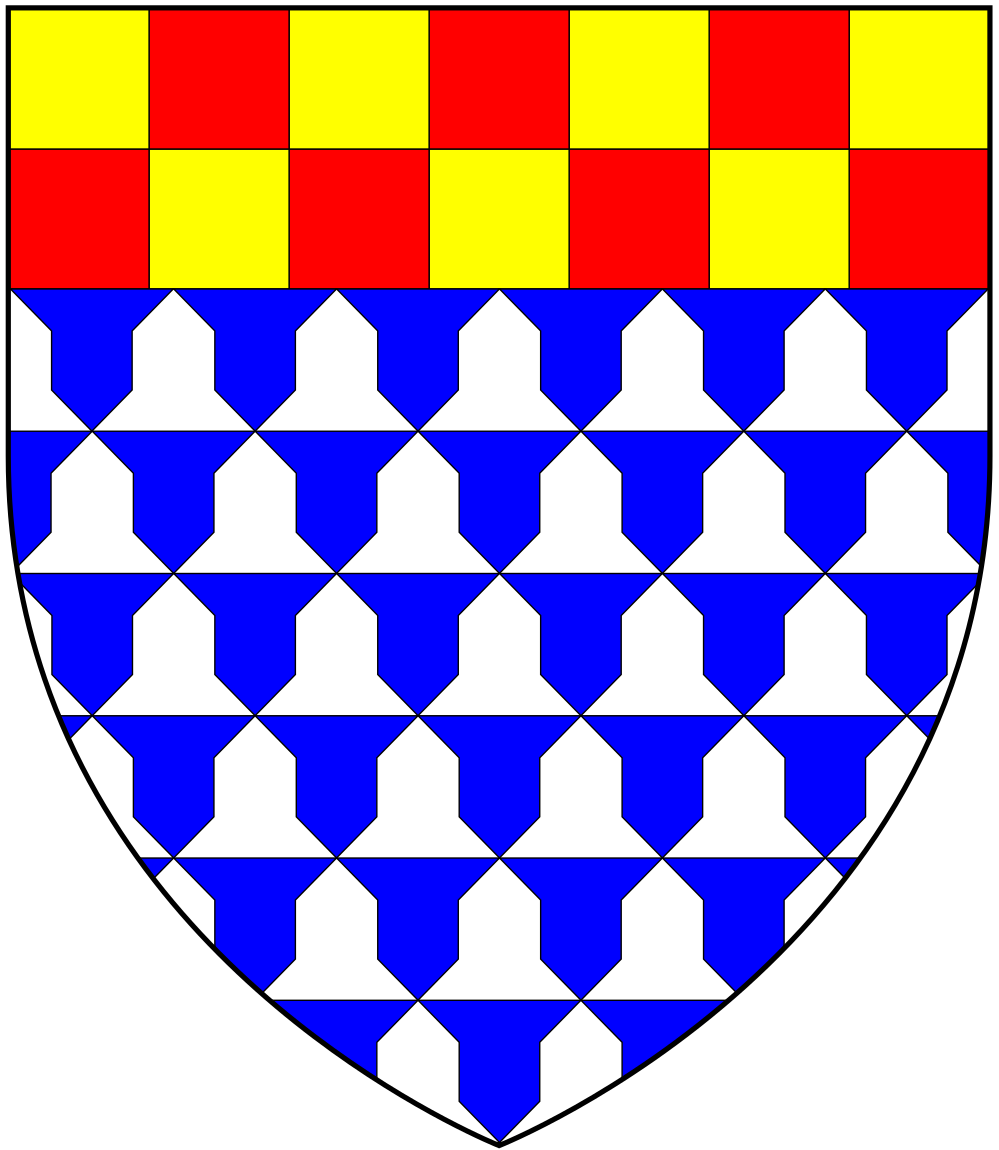
Arms of Fleming, Baron Slane: Vair, a chief chequy or and gules, as shown on the Powell Roll of Arms (c. 1350), Bodleian Library, Oxford. These are the arms of Fleming of Bratton Fleming in Devon, which held that manor after the Norman Conquest

Christopher Fleming, 1st Viscount Longford and 17th Baron Slane (1669–1726), was an Irish peer and a member of the Irish parliament of 1689.

== Career ==
Lord Slane was a Roman Catholic who had been educated in France at University of Douai. He was the only son of Randall Fleming, 16th Baron Slane and his second wife Penelope Moore, daughter of Henry Moore, 1st Earl of Drogheda and Alice Spencer. His father died when he was only seven years old and he was placed in the guardianship of his grandmother, the dowager Lady Drogheda, who petitioned the Crown to restore to him all lands forfeited by the family during the political troubles of the 1640s and 50s.

He served as a colonel in the forces of James II during the 1689–1691 war in Ireland. He fought in such engagements as the Battle of Boyne and Battle of Aughrim, at the latter of which he was taken prisoner. After being released he went abroad and served as a colonel in the French army. By 1704 he had joined the Portuguese army, where he served as a lieutenant general. Through this service he was reconciled to the British Crown; in 1709, his attainder was reversed by the House of Lords. In 1713 he received a royal patent from Queen Anne naming him The 1st Viscount Longford.

== Death and burial ==
Lord Longford (as he then was) died at Fleming Hall, Anticur, in 1726 and was buried in the MacDonnell family vault in Bonamargy Friary at Ballycastle, the burial place of the Earls of Antrim.

== Children and succession ==
He left only one child, a daughter, Helen Fleming, who lived and died in Paris on 7 August 1748. She was unmarried and left no children. The heir to Fleming Hall and the barony was his nephew William Fleming, 23rd Baron Slane. He was the son of Thomas Fleming of Gillanstown in County Meath. William had a son Christopher Fleming, 24th and last Baron Slane, who lived at Fleming Hall and died there in 1771. He left as his sole heiress his daughter who married Felix O’Connor of County Donegal. Following her husband's death, she sold Fleming Hall and moved to Craigs, Finvoy, and then to America.

== Fleming Hall ==
Fleming Hall was purchased by the Leslie family, and was sold by them in 1847 to the Richards family, from whom it descended to the present owners in 2012, the Wallace family.

== Sources ==
- G. E. C., ed. Geoffrey F. White. The Complete Peerage. (London: St. Catherine Press, 1953) Vol. XII, Part 1, p. 19-21.
