= Coll Ciotach =

Scottish adventurer and mercenary

Coll Ciotach Mac Domhnaill (English: Left-handed Coll MacDonald) (1570–1647) was a Scottish adventurer and mercenary of the Clan MacDonald of Dunnyveg branch of Clan Donald, who became Laird of Colonsay in 1623, by treachery. His name, which means "Coll the left-handed" or "the crafty", was anglicised as Colkitto. However he only used the nickname Ciotach late in his life in 1629 when it appeared in a Latin translation of a Gaelic letter where Coll refers to himself as "Ego Collatius Kiotach Macdonnell".

In Gaelic he was referred to as Coll Mac Gilleasbuig ("Coll the son of Archibald"). However in English he was normally known as "Coll Macgilespik" or a variant of this, or as "Coll MacDonald". Some English speakers concluded that "Coll" must be his military rank and that "Ciotach" was a surname. So he was also referred to as: Colonell Kittoghie, Col. Kittack, Collonell McGillespick, Colonel Coill McDonnell alias McGillespick, Col. Killa and Colonel Macdonald. Others took "Coll" or "Coll Ciotach" as places, and so they introduced "MacDonald of Coll" and "MacDonald of Kolkitto".

Coll died aged 77 at Dunyvaig Castle, being executed after he was captured by Clan Campbell opponents.

== Family ==
The Colonsay branch of Clan Macdonald of Dunnyveg was descended from Colla Maol Dubh (d.1558), a notable cavalryman who was the fourth son of Alexander, 5th chief of the Macdonalds of Dunnyveg. Coll was a posthumous son of Colla Maol Dubh's eldest son, Archibald. He was born in Ireland; his birthplace is given as Loughlynch, which is in the parish of Billy, County Antrim, and his mother's name as a local O'Quinn or O'Cahan (O'Kane). Coll is sometimes stated to be a convert from Protestantism to the Catholic church, but seems to have joined it long before the first Catholic mission arrived in 1623, and was noted for his encouragement and support of Catholic interests in the region. The Colonsay branch of the family, although based in the Hebrides, were particularly closely involved with their kinsmen's interests in Antrim.

He married Mary MacDonald of Sanda; those MacDonalds, another cadet branch of the Macdonalds of Dunnyveg, were also caught up in the Wars of the Three Kingdoms, and lost their position as a result of the Dunaverty Massacre. His son, Alasdair Mac Colla, was heavily involved in the wars, fighting both in Ireland and in Scotland.

From his marriage with Mary MacDonald of Sanda, they had issue:

- Gilleasbuig (Archibald), killed at Dunaverty Castle in 1647.
- Aonghus (Angus), killed at Dunaverty Castle in 1647.
- Alasdair (Alexander), married Elizabeth MacAlister, died at Battle of Knocknanauss in 1647.
- Seamus (James)

This family is alluded to in a sonnet of John Milton (Sonnet XI) which has a line referring to three generations:

[...]Colkitto or Macdonnel or Galasp.

Galasp stands in for Gillespie (anglicised name).
