= Slieve-na-Aura =

Mountain in County Antrim, Northern Ireland

Highest point
- Elevation: 511 m (1,677 ft)

Geography
- Location: Loughguile, County Antrim, Northern Ireland

Slieve-na-Aura, also known as Slieveanorra, (from Irish Sliabh an Earra 'mountain of the tail/ridge') is a 1,676-foot-high (511 m) mountain in County Antrim, Northern Ireland. Situated near the village of Loughguile, the mountain sits above Slieveanorra Forest.

The mountain is part of the Slieveanorra Nature Reserve, which features a diverse array of peatland habitats. This area is of special scientific interest due to its peatland flora and associated fauna. The reserve includes several plots of peat bog that showcase different stages in the formation and erosion of peat, supporting various plant species such as heather, sphagnum moss, and cotton grass.
