= Glenshesk =

Glen in County Antrim, Northern Ireland

Coordinates: 55°10′18″N 6°12′58″W

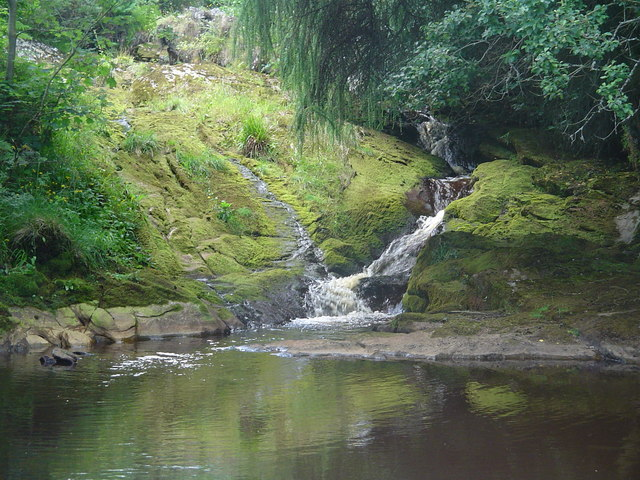
The Glenshesk River

Glenshesk (Irish: Gleann Seisce, English: the sedgy glen) is one of the nine Glens of Antrim in County Antrim, Northern Ireland. It was shaped by glacial erosion. The glen lies on the eastern side of Knocklayd mountain and flows out to the sea at Ballycastle.

At the bottom of Glenshesk lies the Glenshesk river, initially a steep-sided meltwater channel.

At the foot of the glen is the ruins of the Franciscan Friary of Bunamargy, built in 1485. A number of battles occurred in the valleys of the glen and a number of standing stones mark the burial places of people killed in battle.
