= Glenshesk River =

River in County Antrim, Northern Ireland

Coordinates: 55°12′N 6°14′W

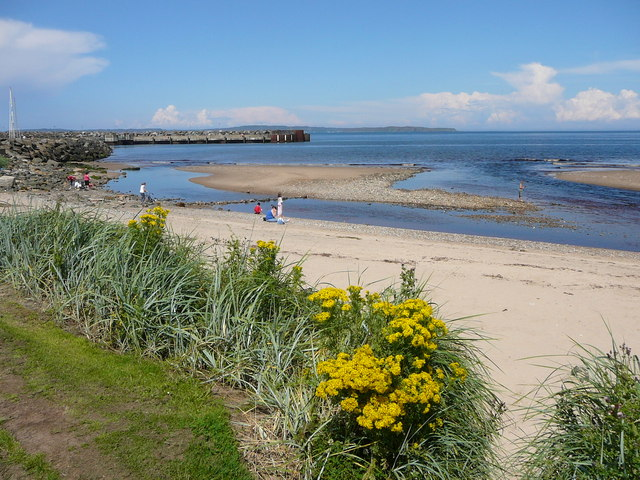
The mouth of the Glenshesk

The Glenshesk River is a river in County Antrim, Northern Ireland. It runs through the Glenshesk valley, one of the Glens of Antrim, and enters the sea at Ballycastle.
