= Gillaspick MacDonnell =

17th-century Irish noble killed in accident

Gillaspick MacDonnell (Giolla Easpuig MacDomhnaill) was a son of Colla MacDonnell, Captain of the Route and Evelyn MacQuillan. He was killed accidentally in 1571 at Ballycastle.

== Biography ==
Upon the death of his father in 1558 at Kinbane Castle, his uncle Sorley Boy MacDonnell, organised to exchange the castle with another property at Colonsay. The castle was then presented to Owen MacIan Dubh MacAllister, 2nd of Loup, Chief of Clan MacAlister as a reward for their service and loyalty to the MacDonnell clan.

His uncle Sorley Boy ordered the celebration of public games at Ballycastle to celebrate the coming of age of his nephew in 1571. Bullfighting was amongst the events that Gillaspick tried and he was gored by the bull and was killed.

Gillaspick left behind a wife and a baby son, Col Ciotach Mac Giolla Easpuig Mac Domhnaill.
