= Fathom Castle =

Former castle in County Down, Northern Ireland

Fathom Castle, also known as Feedom Castle, was a castle in Fathom (sometimes 'Fidun') County Armagh near Newry, County Down, Northern Ireland.

== History ==
A stronghold of the O'Neill's, the castle was taken by the English during the Nine Years War and was then demolished in 1730 for the development of a canal. Originally, it was a holding of Hugh DeLacy, as there is reference to an 'old castle' being there, before Shane O'Neill built his structure c. 1550s and used it as a primary residence.

It appears on a number of old maps one of which can be found on the British Library site here: Link to page displaying map from 1602

Being on the western approach to the settlement at Carlingford, where King John's Castle was being built c. 1180–1200, it most probably was a fortified structure occupied by a knight in the service of DeLacy. There is definite mention of Sir Robert Marmion being at a prest of knights before King John in Dublin in 1210. It would appear that this Sir Robert was the knight responsible for Fidun/Fathom Castle. He entered Ireland with Strongbow and other Normans in 1169–1172 as documented, and there is mention of other Marmions, presumably his descendants being 'of Fidun', i.e. Sir Gilbert in 1290 and a William as late as 1305.

With the Gaelic resurgence, the 'Fidun' location (also referred to as 'the fort in the Forest') was abandoned and the Marmion family relocated to nearby fortified Carlingford (strongly defended by troops of King John's Castle.) The Marmions were prominent in the governance of Carlingford until 1655 when they were dispossessed for rebellion, losing their large holdings including a castle which was possibly the structure now referred to as 'The Mint'.
