= Colla MacDonnell =

Colla MacDonnell was a son of Alexander MacDonnell, Lord of Islay and Kintyre (Cantire), and Catherine, daughter of the Lord of Ardnamurchan. He died at Kinbane Castle in 1558.

== Biography ==
After the death of his father Alexander MacDonnell in 1539, his older brother James MacDonnell, inherited the title of Lord of Dunnyveg and Antrim Glynns, however James decided to return to Scotland, accompanied by his wife Agnus Campbell. Colla was appointed Captain of the Route to rule the Glynns in his absence.

Colla's marriage to Evelyn MacQuillan, brought a tentative peace between the previous opposing clans.

Attempts were made by Thomas Radclyffe, 3rd Earl of Sussex, Lord Lieutenant of Ireland, to expel the MacDonnells back to Scotland. Colla built a two storey castle, known as Kinbane Castle in 1547, with a large courtyard with traces of other buildings, probably constructed out of wood.

In 1551 the castle was besieged by English forces under the command of the Lord Deputy of Ireland, Sir James Croft, in the course of an expedition against the MacDonnell's. Another siege in 1555 was by English forces; the castle was partly destroyed by cannon fire and rebuilt afterwards by Colla.

Colla MacDonnell died at Kinbane Castle in 1558. James MacDonnell then offered the Captain of the Route to his brothers Alasdair MacDonnell and Angus MacDonnell in turn, with both refusing. This was a difficult frontier posting, subject to hostility from the English and risings from the displaced MacQuillin's, and upon offering to the youngest brother Sorley Boy MacDonnell, he accepted.

== Family ==
By his wife, Evelyn MacQuillan, they had:

- Gillaspick, died in 1571 at Ballycastle.
- Randal

== Bibliography ==
- Hill, G., An Historical Account of the MacDonnells of Antrim, 1873.
