= Clan McQuillan =

Irish clan

Clan McQuillan (Irish: Mac Uighilín) is an Irish clan that descends from the north coast of County Antrim in Ulster in the north-east of Ireland. Still a popular name throughout County Antrim, the McQuillans are known mostly for their association with Dunluce Castle and for their battles with the Scottish McDonnell clan.

== Origin of name ==
The name McQuillan is of disputed origin, as the full ancient genealogy of the McQuillan was lost in the 1760s by Ephraim MacQuillan, with two prevailing theories:

- The most commonly accepted theory is that they descended from Hugh de Mandeville, a member of the Cambro-Norman de Mandeville dynasty, with McQuillan deriving from Mac Uighilín meaning son of Uighilín, the Gaelic version of Hugelin, itself the diminutive of Norman name Hugh (Aodh in modern Irish).
- They descend from Fiacha MacUillin, youngest son of Niall of the Nine Hostages.

Spelling variations for the name include: McQuillan, McQuillen, McQuillian, McQuillin, McQuillon, McCailin, McAilin, MacQuillian, MacQuillon, MacCaillion, MacQuillin, MacQuillan, McKillan, McKellen, McQuilland, McAiland, McAylin, McCaillion, McKillion, McKillin, McKillon, MacKillan, MacQuilland, MacAyland, MacAilan, Quillan and many more.

== History ==
In 1442, according to the Annals of Ulster, the MacQuillan-O'Cahan feud started.

By the 1460s, with the earldom of Ulster near its end, the surviving de Mandevilles of north Antrim deserted their manors in Twescard and sold their interests to the McQuillans who were already established there. The McQuillans would rename Twescard, the Route, after their "rout", a common term then for a private army. Their principal residence in the Route was at Dunluce Castle, near the mouth of the River Bush.

The end of the McQuillan-O'Cahan feud came in 1559, when their allies, the MacDonnells of the Glens turned upon them. Sorley Boy MacDonnell, with the aid of levies from Scotland, launched a mass assault on the Route against the McQuillans. The final battle of this assault was at Aura, and saw the end of the McQuillans and the conquest of the Route by the MacDonnells.

== See also ==
- Twescard
- Earldom of Ulster
