= Bonamargy Friary =

Friary in Northern Ireland

Coordinates: 55°12′07″N 6°13′51″W

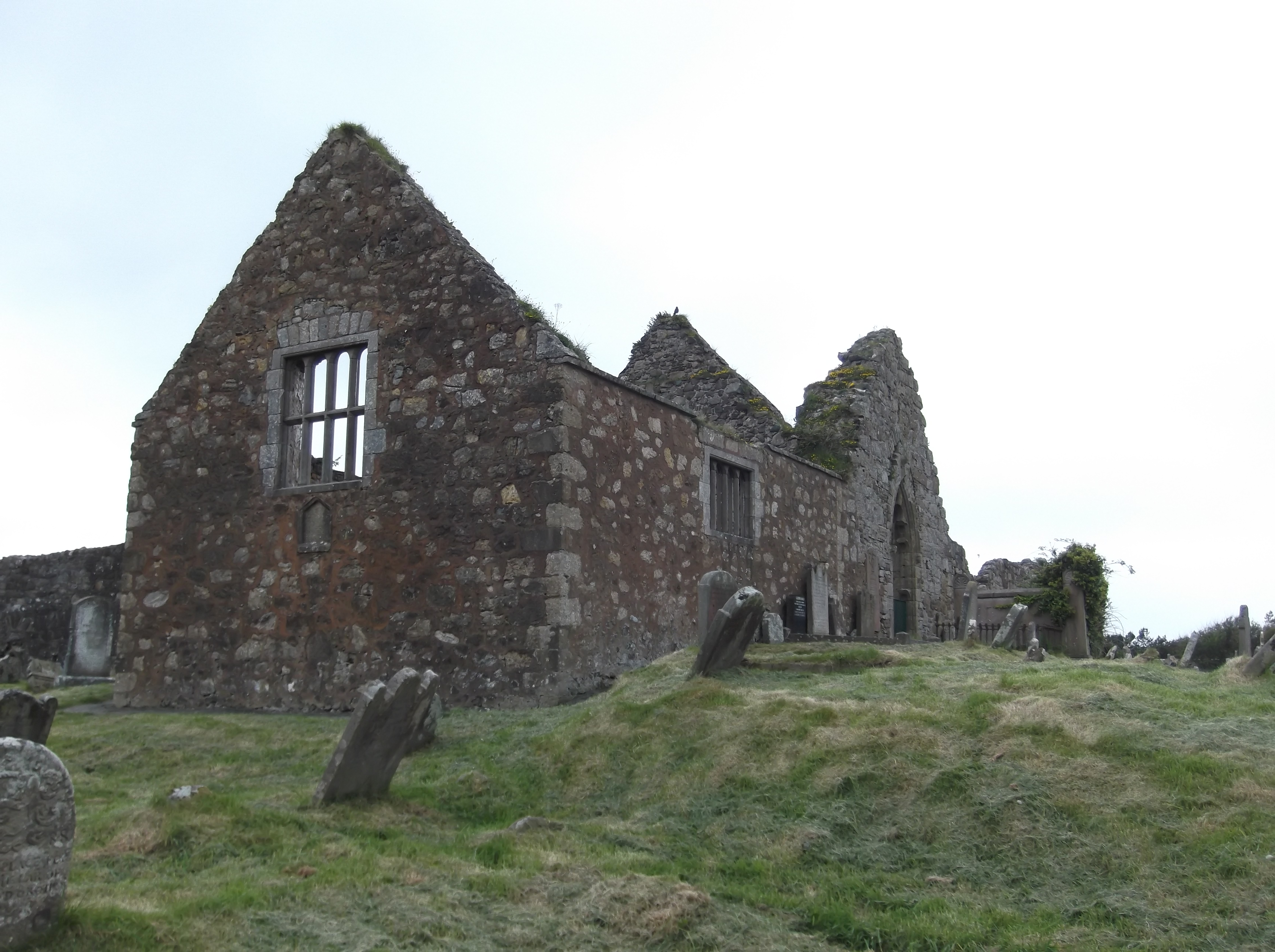
Bonamargy Friary

Bonamargy Friary is situated in County Antrim, Northern Ireland, off the Cushendall Road on the approach to Ballycastle. The name Bonamargy means ‘foot of the Margy River’, the river formed by the joining of the Cary River and Shesk Rivers.

It is a late Franciscan foundation established in 1485 by Rory MacQuillan. It is said that the first battle between the warring MacDonnell and MacQuillan clans was fought on nearby land. At the main entrance to the friary is a small two-storey gatehouse which opens into a store and workroom. Well worn steps lead directly to the dormitory above. Traces of an altar can still be found in the adjoining church, and the locked vaults hold the remains of the celebrated chieftain, Sorley Boy MacDonnell, and several of the Earls of Antrim. His grandson Randall, 1st Marquess of Antrim, noted for his role in the War of the Three Kingdoms, is also buried there.

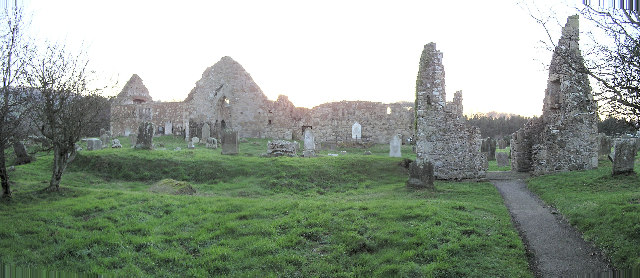
Bonamargy Friary

Perhaps the friary's most famous resident was the 17th century prophet and recluse Julia MacQuillen. Known as "The Black Nun", MacQuillen wished to be buried at the entrance of the chapel so that she might be trodden under the feet of those who entered as a token of her humility. MacQuillen also reportedly asked that she not be buried in her coffin and that it be used by the next poor person had need of it. A worn Celtic cross (rounded with a hole in the centre) marks her grave at the west end of the main church. Legend says that she now haunts the site. It is said that those who do the black nun spy, on that very day will die.

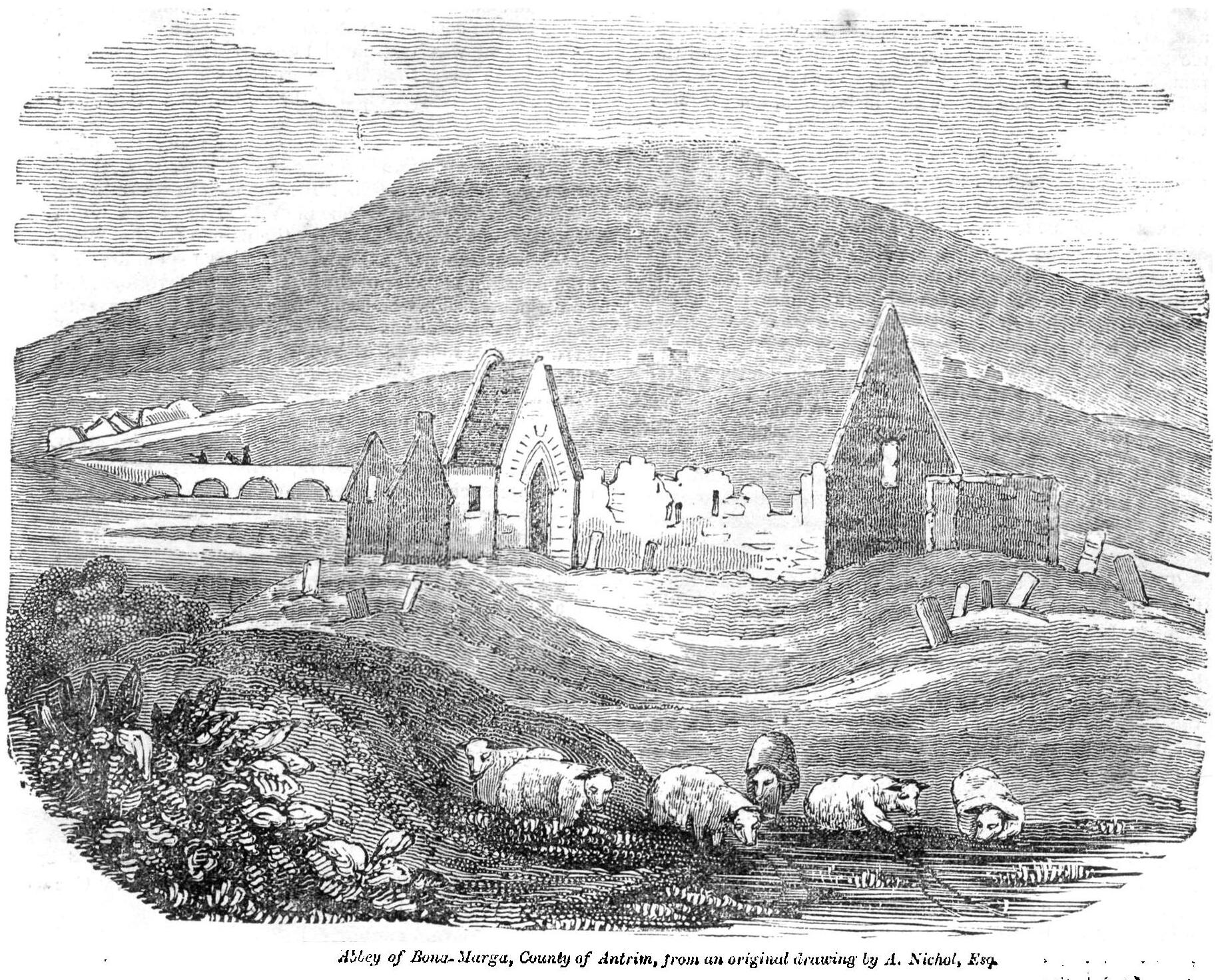
Abbey of Bona-Marga, 1833, sketched by Andrew Nicholl, for the Dublin Penny Journal

Around 1822 four manuscripts were found in an old oaken chest in the ruins of Bonamargy Friary. One of these manuscripts is described as "Saint Bonaventures Life of Christ" and/or "A History of the Blessed Scriptures". Another manuscript contained a large portion of one of the principal theological works of Saint Thomas Aquinas, written on vellum, in very contracted Latin and extending to about 600 quarto pages. The earliest date appearing on it is 1338 and the latest 1380. It originally belonged to the Monastery of Saint Anthony, of Amiens in France.

Bonamargy Franciscan Friary is a State Care Historic Monument in the townland of Bonamargy, in Moyle District Council area, at grid ref: D1268 4086. The area surrounding the state care monument of Bonamargy Friary is a Scheduled Historic Monument, at grid ref: D1268 4087.

== See also ==
- Abbeys and priories in Northern Ireland (County Antrim)
