= Sorley Boy MacDonnell =

Scoto-Irish chief

Somhairle Buíodh MacDomhnaill Sorley Boy Mac Donnell
- Born: 1505
- Died: 1590 (aged 84–85); Dunanynie Castle, Ballycastle, Kingdom of Ireland
- Resting place: Bonamargy Friary
- Predecessor: Colla MacDonnell (brother)
- Successor: Randal MacDonnell (fourth son)
- Spouse(s): 1. Mary, dau. of Conn O'Neill; 2. Unknown, a dau. of Turlough O'Neill
- Children: 4 sons, 5 daughters.

Somhairle Buíodh MacDonnell (Scottish Gaelic: Somhairle Buidhe Mac Domhnaill), known as Sorley Boy MacDonnell, whose last name was also given as MacDonald (c. 1505 – 1590), was a Gaelic chief, the son of Alexander Carragh MacDonnell, 5th of Dunnyveg, of Dunyvaig Castle, lord of Islay and Cantire, and Catherine, daughter of the Lord of Ardnamurchan, both in Scotland. MacDonnell is best known for establishing the MacDonnell clan in Antrim, Ireland, and resisting the campaign of Shane O'Neill and the English crown to expel the clan from Ireland. Sorley Boy's connection to other Irish Roman Catholic lords was complicated, but also culturally and familiarly strong: for example, he married Mary O'Neill, the daughter of Conn O'Neill. He is also known in English as Somerled and Somerled of the yellow hair.

== Clan MacDonnell ==
The MacDonnells of Antrim were a sept of the powerful Clan Donald of the royal Clann Somhairle, (see Lords of the Isles), that the English crown had attempted to cultivate since the early 14th century in its efforts to influence the course of politics in Scotland. At the end of that century an ancestor of Sorley's, John Mór Tanister, had married Margaret Bisset, of the lordship on the Antrim coast known as the Glynns or Glens, which union would eventually lay the basis for Sorley Boy's claim to the lordship of that territory in Ireland. MacDonnell migration to the Glynns and Rathlin Island increased in the early 16th century (by way of swift galleys propelled by oar and sail), after the clan had rejected overtures from an increasingly powerful James IV, King of Scotland. However, the last known lord of the Mac Eoin Bissetts, a supporter of the O'Neills, was slain in battle in 1522, and it is only after this that the MacDonnells somehow emerge as claimants to the lordship. The precise circumstances of this transfer or encroachment have been lost to history, but the English authorities, themselves preparing to claim overlordship in Ulster and the rest of Ireland, still recognised the Bissetts as the lords of the Glynns as late as 1515.

The English feared the formation of a fifth column, with the Ulster clans of O'Neill and O'Donnell, which might lay the foundation of a Bruce-style invasion of Ireland, and the clan did spread into the adjacent territories of Clandeboy and the Route. This migration from Scotland was cemented when the king's successor, James V, chose to maintain favourable relations with the rival Clan Campbell, although he did swing around to favour the MacDonnells in the 1530s, restoring certain lands to them in Kintyre and Islay while encouraging their expansion in Ireland. This period of royal favour ended with the defeat in 1539 at the Battle of Belahoe of a combined Irish force (including the MacDonnells) by an English army: Scottish plans for an invasion of Ireland were then put off, while the French invasion of England that King Henry VIII had feared failed to occur.

== Military leader ==
Once the invasion crisis had passed, the MacDonnells resisted efforts by the English and Scots governments to drive them from their lands in the Western Isles of Scotland and Ulster in Ireland.

Sorley Boy was born at Dunanynie Castle near Ballycastle, County Antrim in Ireland, and came to prominence during the mid-to-late 16th century, when the Dublin administration waged periodic campaigns in the Route. During the first campaign in 1550, Sorley Boy was taken prisoner and confined in Dublin Castle for twelve months, and was finally released in exchange for certain prisoners held by his brother, James, who was leader of the clan.

After his release, Sorley Boy received a large ransom upon seizing the constable of Carrickfergus Castle, and went on to subjugate the MacQuillans. This clan was the immediate rival of the MacDonnells in Ireland, dominating the northern portion of Antrim – the Route – with their stronghold at Dunluce Castle, near the mouth of the River Bush. In 1558, the MacDonnell chieftain committed to him the lordship of the Route upon the death of his brother Colla, and Sorley Boy promptly raised a force of troops on the Scottish coast to confront the MacQuillans, former allies of the MacDonell clan. He landed at Marketon Bay in July 1559, where the MacQuillans were strongly posted at the foot of Glenshesk, his camp at Bonamargy was attacked with both suffering heavy losses. Sorley then attacked them at Beal a Faula, driving them south with heavy losses. Several bloody encounters followed, where the MacQuillans were defeated and driven from the Route.

Sorley Boy was now too powerful and turbulent to be neglected by Queen Elizabeth and her ministers, who were also being troubled by his great contemporary, Shane O'Neill. For the next twenty years, the history of Ulster consists for the most part of alternating conflict and alliance between MacDonnells and O'Neills, and attempts on the part of the English government to subdue them both. With this object Elizabeth aimed at fomenting the rivalry between the two clans; she came to terms sometimes with one and sometimes with the other. One event that simplified the situation for the queen was the success in 1560 of the Protestant revolution in Scotland, which largely removed the threat of invasion her father had suffered in 1539. But complications were never wanting in Ulster, owing to the criss-cross of dynastic and political allegiances and betrayals. At this time Shane O'Neill was allied by marriage with the Campbells, the MacDonnell clan's chief rival in Scotland; yet Sorley Boy's wife was a half-sister of the same Shane.

== Clan chief ==
Upon Elizabeth's accession in 1559 Sorley Boy had submitted to her authority under Thomas Radclyffe, 3rd Earl of Sussex, then Lord-Lieutenant of Ireland, and in return was confirmed in his Irish possessions. In 1562 Shane O'Neill paid his celebrated visit to London, where he obtained recognition by Elizabeth of his claims as head of the O'Neills. But in 1563, Sussex mounted a campaign against O'Neill, in which Sorley Boy played his part. Sussex retired in frustration, and O'Neill entered into a sustained offensive against the MacDonnells, ostensibly in the interests of ridding the English of Scottish interference in Ireland: he defeated Sorley Boy near Coleraine in the summer of 1564, laying waste his territory; in 1565 he invaded the Glynns, destroying all Scottish settlements there, and at the Battle of Glentasie he won a decisive victory, in which James MacDonnell and Sorley Boy were taken prisoner and Dunluce Castle fell into O'Neill's hands.

James died soon afterwards, but Sorley Boy remained O'Neill's captive until 1567, during which period he seems to have won his captor's confidence. After his unexpected defeat by the O'Donnells in the battle of Farsetmore, O'Neill turned to the MacDonnells for assistance and attended a feast laid on by them at Cushendun, bringing with him out of captivity Sorley Boy and his late brother's widow, Agnes, to secure an alliance with the Scots. In an event which seems to have had the approbation of the lord deputy of Ireland, Henry Sidney, O'Neill was stabbed and murdered by his hosts. Sorley Boy visited Scotland immediately and returned to Marketon Bay with 600 redshanks, in whose presence he swore never to leave Ireland.

In 1569, an alliance between the O'Neills and MacDonnells was secured upon the marriage on Rathlin Island of Shane's successor, Turlough Lynagh O'Neill, to the widow Agnes. Sorley Boy spent the next few years striving to frustrate the schemes of Sir Thomas Smith, and later of the Earl of Essex, for colonising Ulster with English settlers. (See Plantations of Ireland for details). He was willing to come to terms with the government provided his claims to the lands were allowed, but Essex determined to reduce him to unconditional submission. After a retreat into Scotland, Sorley Boy returned and made an unsuccessful attempt on the crown garrison at Carrickfergus. In time, he did come to terms with Smith, who supported his claims to title in the Route on condition that he take up the reformed religion. In 1573, letters of denization were addressed to Sorley Boy from the crown, but Essex frustrated these with the renewal of his plantation scheme; still, Sorley Boy managed to hold his position, when Essex failed in his negotiation with the Scottish regent and the Earl of Argyll of a withdrawal of the Scots from Ulster.

Essex then switched tack, having struck a deal with Turlough Lynagh, and defeated Sorley Boy around Castle Toome, where the Bann flows out of Lough Neagh. Essex had to withdraw to Carrickfergus for lack of provisions, but he then ordered a follow-up operation, with the intention of driving the Scots from Ulster. Under the commands of John Norris and Francis Drake an amphibious strike force proceeded by sea from Carrickfergus to Rathlin Island, where Sorley Boy's children and valuables, together with the families of his principal retainers, had been lodged for safety; and while the chieftain was himself at Ballycastle, within sight of the island, its garrison along with civilians hiding on it were massacred by Norris' troops. Sorley Boy retaliated with a successful raid on Carrickfergus, in which the garrison broke before a highland charge, and managed to partly re-establish his power in the Glynns and the Route.

In 1583, taking advantage of Sorley's perceived weakness through the absence of a significant number of MacDonnell warriors, who had been hired by Turlough Lynagh for a campaign in the west, the Mac Quillans made their last great attempt to decisively defeat the MacDonnells and recover the Route. In alliance with Sir Hugh MacPhelim Bacagh O'Neill of Edenduffcarrick (Shane's Castle, Randalstown) and accompanied by two companies of English musketeers 'sent from the pale' and commanded by the newly appointed Senechel of Clandeboye, Captain Chatterton, the Mac Quillans launched a devastating raid on the northern glens. Sorley assembled a small force which threatened the main camp of the raiders sited on a broad ridge near Slieve na Orra. The cavalry and heavy infantry of the raiders were tricked into charging the small, apparently vulnerable, MacDonnell host across what they believed to be sound ground but what was in fact a deep bog, where they were incapacitated and decisively defeated by the MacDonnells. Hugh Mac Phelim and Chatterton fled, but were hunted down and killed near the summit of Orra while Rory Oge MacQuillan sought refuge on a crannog at Loughgile, where he was killed by a pursuer. This action is called the battle of Slieve-an-aura and has been inaccurately dated to 1559 by a number of sources, following Rev. George Hill's history, The MacDonnells of Antrim. The accurate date has been preserved in the State Papers for Ireland.

On surveying the results, Lord Deputy Sidney agreed to a ceasefire, although he supported the claims of the MacQuillans to the Route, and of Sorley Boy's nephews (sons of the widow Agnes) to possession of the Glens – a typical Campbell manoeuvre, effected through their alliance with Turlough Lynagh. At the same time, Sidney forwarded to London Sorley Boy's petition for title, although it sat there without response for years. With fortitude, the MacDonnells managed to strengthen their position through an alliance with Turlough Lynagh, and by a formidable immigration of followers from the Scottish Isles following their decisive victory at Aura.

== Ambition achieved ==
For some years the politics of eastern Ulster were maintained in a balance. But in 1584 the recently arrived lord deputy of Ireland, Sir John Perrot, led his army into the province in a determined effort to dislodge the Scots. Following an expedition to Scotland in search of reinforcements, Sorley Boy landed at Cushendun in January 1585 with a substantial army, but after initial successes, he was driven back to Scotland, where he offered to accept the terms formerly put to him by Sidney; Perrot declined, whereupon Sorley Boy returned and regained possession of Dunluce Castle. Perrot reluctantly opened negotiations with Sorley Boy, sending as his emissary Sir William Warren, whose father Humphrey had been on good terms with Sorley during Sussex's Deputyship. Warren persuaded Sorley to come to terms, and in the summer of 1586, he repaired to Dublin and made submission to Elizabeth's representative. When shown the severed head of his son, which had been nailed above the gate of Dublin Castle, Sorley Boy gave the memorable response, "My son hath many heads". Below is a transcription of the submission to Sir John Perrot.

1586- SORLIE MCCONNELL'S SUBMISSION

DEPUTY PERROT

Most honorable Governor, it is and maybe truly said that there is no unhappiness comparable to his that may say he hath been once in good Estate, and is fallen from it through his own folly ; amongst many others in that case, I may and do reckon myself for none of the least, for being a man born out of this realm, and gotten large possessions in the same, whereupon I lived, though I might claim none by inheritance, I have very inconsiderately presumed to think I might as well hold it as I got it, by strong hand : carried on with this imagination, as one ignorant of Her Majesty's might and force, (and withal ill persuaded by others) I unhappily refused to come in to your Lordship, as the rest of Ulster did, now almost two years past, thinking it might suffice for me upon you- Lordship's repair into those parts to write a letter of some kind of observance unto you, with an offer after a sort to come myself. Also upon such capitulations (as now to my smart I find,) were unmeet for me to make. But your Lordship having no mind as it hath we appeared, to take advantage of my rash oversight, vouchsafed to license the Earl of Tyrone and Sir Edward Moore to send unto me such gracious conditions, as I grieve to think that I refused them, and wish the unadvised letters I wrote to your: Lordship, the haughty words I uttered, and the indiscreet means I then made (to- have men of far better sort than myself to be in pledge for me) were buried up in forgetfulness. I condemn my folly in leaving such men in the Castle of Dunluce, within this Her Highness' land as should say they kept it in the name, or to the use of the King of Scots, a Prince that honom'eth Her Majesty and embraceth her favour. I sorrow for my perseverance in that purpose, whereby I have justly drawn Her Majesty's force, and whet Her Majesty's sword against me, which hath slain my son and most of my people, spoiled me of my goods, and left me with a few distressed, being no way able to stand against Her Majesty's force, wherefore I do prostrate myself here at the foot of Her Majesty's clemency submitting myself wholly thereto, and most humbly praying to be restored, only thereby through your noble favour, that is accustomed as well to pity the humble as to suppress the proud and obstinate. And I do most faithfully promise to depend for ever upon Her Majestv's gracious goodness, according to such conditions as it shall please your most honourable Lordship to afford me on the behalf of Her Highness, whom I pray God long- to preserve. Amen.

Your Honour's most humble suppliant,

SORLE McCONELL (his signature)

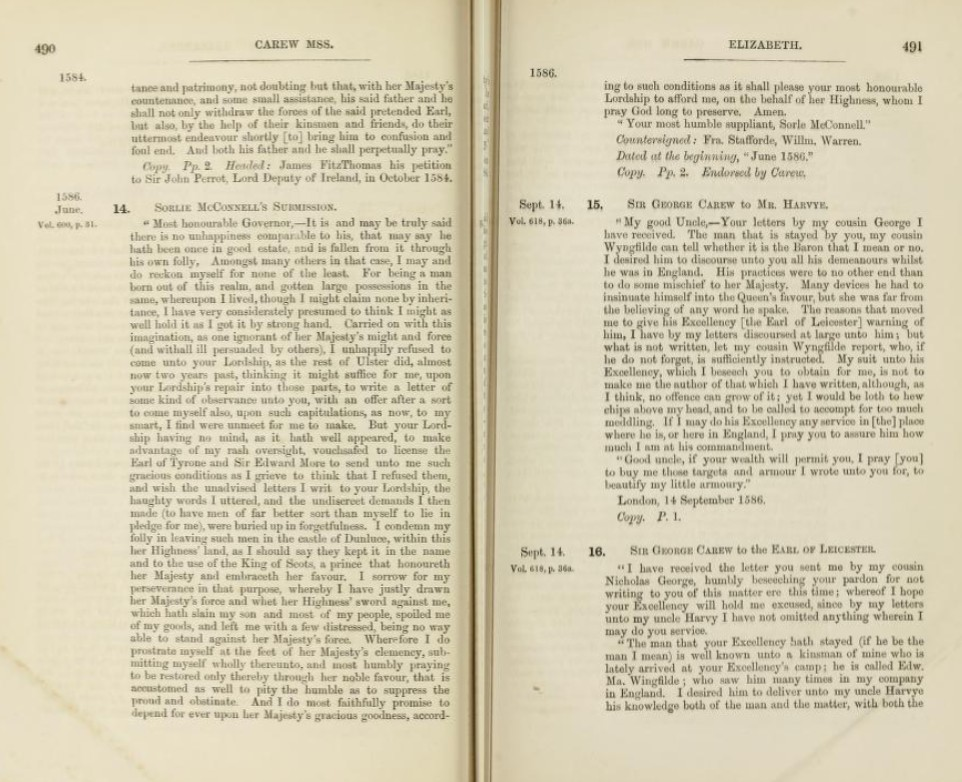
Full text of Sorley Boy McDonnell's submission to Sir John Perrott, Lord General of Ireland, and the Council as Sorle McConell using the Gaelic pronunciation and common spelling of his name.

The name Sorley uses above is akin to the modern surname "McConnell" being the Gaelic pronunciation of the name Mac Domhnaill. Having made his submission, Sorley Boy at last obtained a grant to himself and his heirs of the greater part of the Route country, between the rivers Bann and Bush (an area then called the Boys), with certain other lands to the east, and was made constable of Dunluce Castle. A month beforehand, Sorley Boy's nephew had received a grant in similar terms of the greater part of the Glynns. At the same time, in the Treaty of Berwick, a clause was inserted recognizing the right of the Clan MacDonnell to remain in Ireland.

Sorley Boy gave no further trouble to the English government, although he did assist survivors of the Spanish Armada to escape Ireland in 1588 (see Girona). He died in 1590 at the place of his birth, the Castle of Dunanynie, and was buried in the traditional place of the MacDonnells, Bonamargy Friary at Ballycastle.

== Legacy ==
Prior to the Plantation of Ulster in 1610, Sorley Boy had been the most powerful of the province's Scoto-Irish. Owing to his efforts, successive Tudor and Stuart administrations in England and Scotland were presented with ongoing strategic difficulties in the region of east Ulster and southwest Scotland. During the previous forty years, he had played those difficulties with courage, skill and deception, to the point that MacDonnell's claims were largely accepted and the clan's fortunes secured.

== Family ==
With his first wife, Mary, daughter of Conn O'Neill, 1st Earl of Tyrone, their children were:

- Alaster MacDonnell, Killed in battle in 1585
- Donnell MacDonnell
- James MacDonnell, died on 13 April 1601 at Dunluce Castle
- Randal MacDonnell, 1st Earl of Antrim died 10 December 1636
- Angus MacDonnell
- Ludar MacDonnell
- unknown daughter married a chief of Clan Macnaghten
- unknown daughter married a chief of Clan McQuillan
- unknown daughter married Cormack O'Neill
- unknown daughter married Magennis, Lord of Iveagh
- unknown daughter married Shane O'Neill of Clandeboye

In 1588, when he was past the age of eighty years, his second wife was a daughter of Turlough Luineach O'Neill, a kinswoman of his first wife.

Two of his five daughters married members of the O'Neill family. By his first marriage Sorley Boy had several sons (known as the MacSorleys): two were killed, and Randal, who was created earl of Antrim, is the ancestor of the present holder of that title. It was to Randal that King James I renewed the grants of the Route and the Glynns.
