= Loughguile =

Village in County Antrim, Northern Ireland

Coordinates: 55.061°N 6.306°W

Loughguile: Irish: Loch gCaol
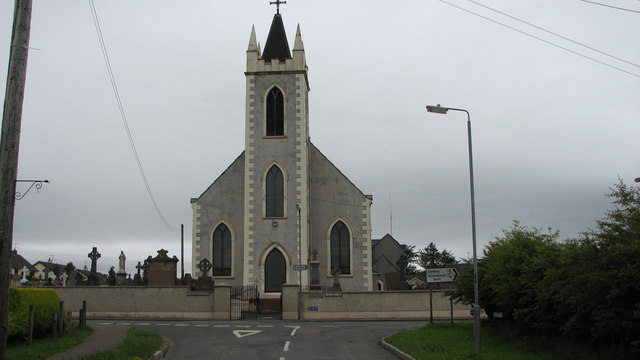
- St Patrick's Catholic church

- Location within Northern Ireland
- Population: 396 (2011 census)
- Irish grid reference: D082250
  - Belfast: 46 mi (74 km)
  - Dublin: 118 mi (190 km)
- District: Causeway Coast and Glens
- County: County Antrim
- Country: Northern Ireland
- Sovereign state: United Kingdom
- Post town: BALLYMENA
- Postcode district: BT44
- Dialling code: 028
- UK Parliament: North Antrim
- NI Assembly: North Antrim

Loughguile (/lɒxˈɡiːl/ lokh-GEEL; from Irish Loch gCaol, meaning 'lake of the narrow'), also spelt as Loughgiel, is a village and civil parish in County Antrim, Northern Ireland. Situated 8 miles east of Ballymoney, it is within the Causeway Coast and Glens Council area, and is at the edge of the Glens of Antrim. The village had a population of 396 people (128 households) in the 2011 census.

== Education ==
The local schools are St. Patrick's Primary School and St. Anne's Primary School.

== Sports ==
The hurling team, Loughgiel Shamrocks, is the only team in Ulster to have won the All-Ireland Senior Club Hurling Championship, doing so in 1983 and 2012. The club also currently has the highest number of county titles in Antrim (20).

== Notable people ==
- George Macartney, 1st Earl Macartney (14 May 1737 – 31 May 1806), British statesman, colonial administrator and diplomat.
- Henry Henry (1846–1908), Bishop of Down and Connor, was from Loughguile.
- Cahal Daly (1917–2009), Lord Primate of All Ireland and Archbishop of Armagh, was a native of the parish. Daly had previously served as Bishop of Down and Connor.

== See also ==
- List of civil parishes of County Antrim
- List of towns and villages in Northern Ireland
