= Ballycastle, County Antrim =

Seaside town in County Antrim, Northern Ireland

Ballycastle: Irish: Baile an Chaistil; Scots: Ballykessel or Bellycaissle
- Ballycastle harbour

- Location within Northern Ireland
- Population: 5,628 (2021 census)
- Irish grid reference: D115407
  - Belfast: 55 miles (89 km)
- District: Causeway Coast and Glens
- County: County Antrim
- Country: Northern Ireland
- Sovereign state: United Kingdom
- Post town: BALLYCASTLE
- Postcode district: BT54
- Dialling code: 028
- Police: Northern Ireland
- Fire: Northern Ireland
- Ambulance: Northern Ireland
- UK Parliament: North Antrim
- NI Assembly: North Antrim

Ballycastle (from Irish Baile an Chaistil, meaning 'town of the castle') is a small seaside town in County Antrim, Northern Ireland. It is on the north-easternmost coastal tip of Ireland, in the Antrim Coast and Glens Area of Outstanding Natural Beauty.

Ballycastle lies at roughly the midpoint of the Causeway Coastal Route and is a gateway to both the Glens of Antrim and the North Coast. With a number of attractions on the town's doorstep such as the Giant's Causeway, Carrick-a-Rede Rope Bridge and the Dark Hedges it is a popular destination and stopping point for tourists. The town also benefits from a sweeping bay and beach on its eastern side, with views to Fair Head and Knocklayde mountain dominating the landscape.

The town has been recognised on a number of occasions by The Sunday Times on their "Best Places To Live" list, and has been previously crowned the overall regional winner for Northern Ireland.

The harbour hosts the ferry to Rathlin Island and a smaller passenger and charter service to Campbeltown and Port Ellen in Scotland, with both Rathlin Island and Scotland's Kintyre peninsula able to be seen from the coast. The Ould Lammas Fair is held each year in Ballycastle on the last Monday and Tuesday of August. Ballycastle is the home of the Corrymeela Community.

Ballycastle had a population of 5,628 at the 2021 census. It was the seat and main settlement of the former Moyle District Council.

== History ==
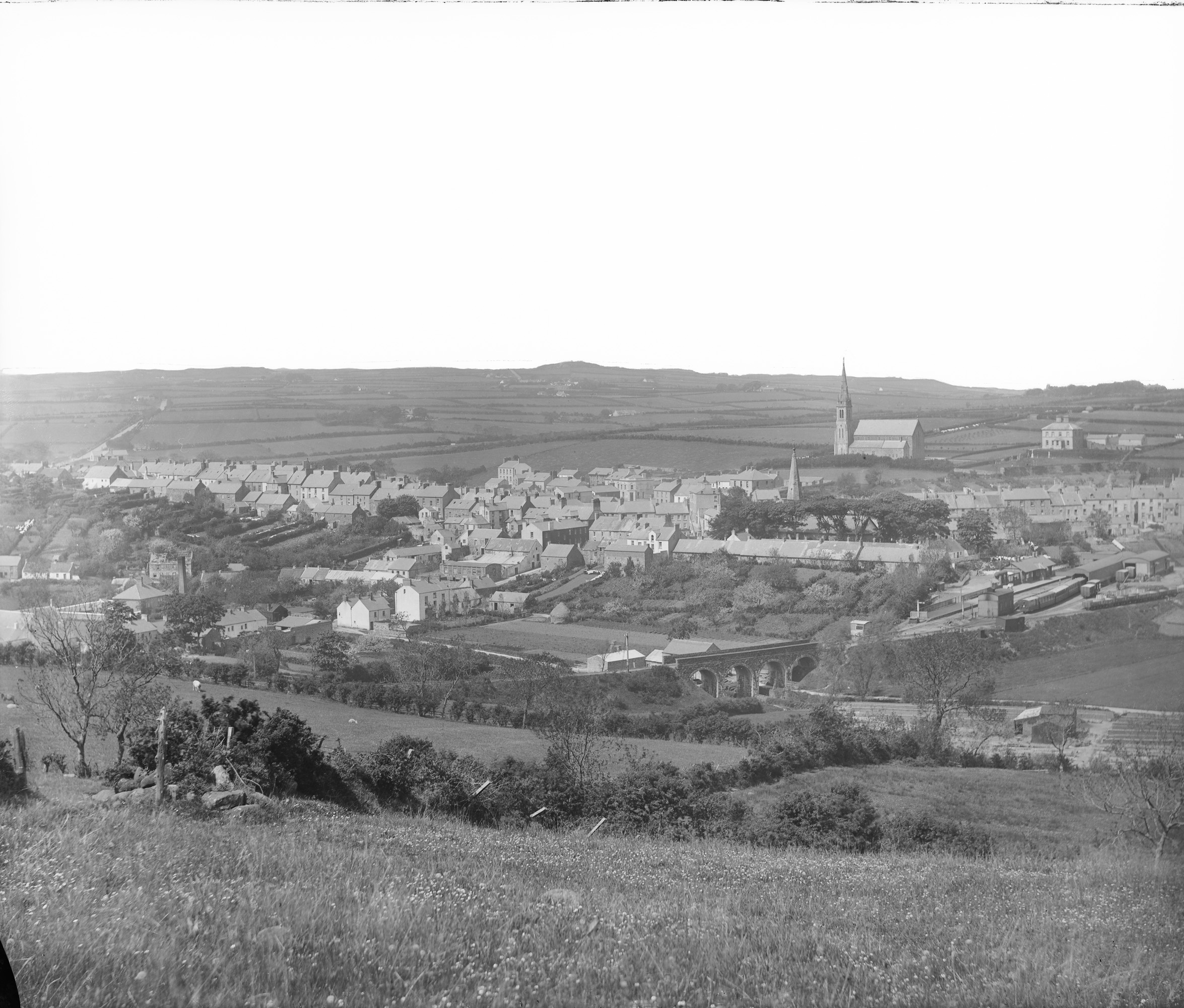
A view of Ballycastle c. 1914

=== Early history ===
Ballycastle can trace its history back to the founding of a settlement around Port Brittas, the old name for Ballycastle Bay. It is from here that it has been suggested that Fergus Mór mac Eirc, a purported king of Dalriada, sailed to Scotland and founded a large colony in Argyll.

From the late 14th century the area was at the centre of the territory controlled by the MacDonnells of Antrim. Descended from Clan MacDonald of Dunnyveg, it was through the marriage of John Mór MacDonald and Margery Byset in 1399 that the clan laid the basis of their claim to the Glens of Antrim. However it wasn't until the 16th century when the celebrated chieftain Sorley Boy MacDonnell of Dunaneeny Castle established the clan in both the Glens and The Route.

The settlement around Dunaneeny Castle, along with the settlements at Bonamargy Friary and the castle in the area of the Diamond merged to become the present day town. It is from this castle, that stood on the site of Holy Trinity Church, which the town derived its name. Ballycastle Castle which had been in the possession of the MacDonnell's, before being seized by both Scottish and later Cromwellian troops, fell into disrepair with the last remaining walls being removed in the 19th century.

Around the year 1786 Hugh Boyd, the son of the rector of Ramoan parish church, obtained a lease and permission from parliament to build a new harbour and pier to protect shipping. He is known for establishing coal shafts, potteries, a glass factory and a number of industries which under his care saw Ballycastle become a flourishing town. Hugh Boyd is credited for the construction or establishment of a number of buildings that still stand in the town today.

=== The Troubles in Ballycastle ===
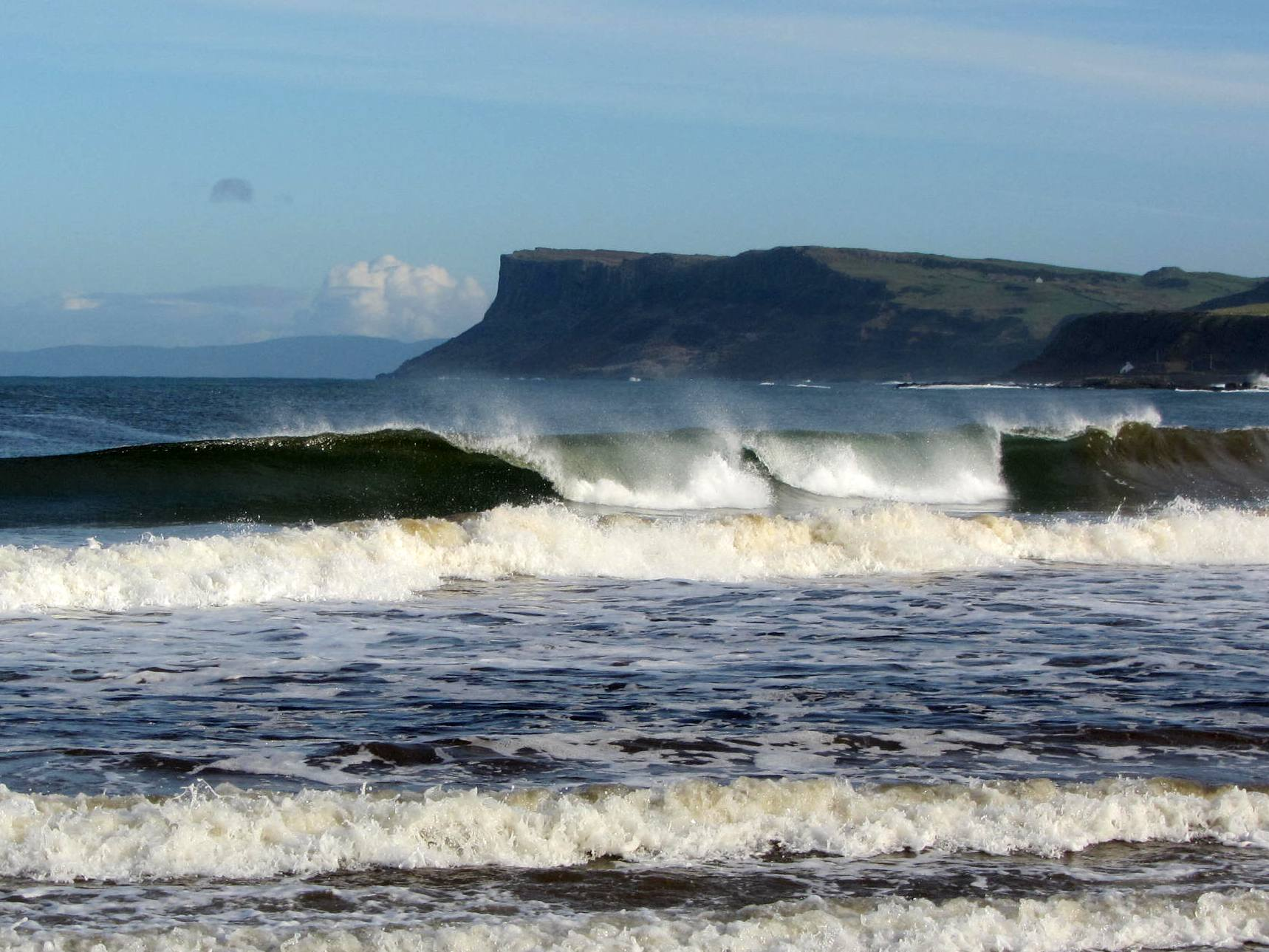
Waves in Ballycastle; Scotland can be seen in the background

There were several incidents during what came to be known as the Troubles in Northern Ireland, including:

- Loyalist paramilitaries left a car bomb outside the Roman Catholic church (St. Patrick's & St. Brigid's) in the town on 26 August 1973. It was timed to explode as massgoers left the church, but the service ran late, and the bomb detonated when the congregation were still inside the church, avoiding large-scale loss of life. 50 people were injured, 3 of them seriously.
- On 19 June 1979 the Irish Republican Army bombed five hotels in different seaside towns in Northern Ireland, including Ballycastle's Marine Hotel. William Whitten, a 65-year-old Protestant hotel guest, was seriously injured in the blast; he died three weeks later.
- Spence McGarry (46), an off-duty member of the Royal Ulster Constabulary (RUC), was killed when a Provisional Irish Republican Army booby trap bomb attached to his car exploded in Castle Street car park on 6 April 1991. Gerard Butler was convicted in 1993 for the attack, and sentenced to 22 years in prison.
- In 2001, there was an attempt at mass murder by the Red Hand Defenders when a car bomb was left in Castle Street during the annual Lammas Fair.

=== Parade disputes ===
In the past, there has been unrest during Orange Order parades in the town. In 2001, there was serious public disorder at the 12 July parade. As a result of this, the Silver Plains flute band, from nearby Moyarget, was banned from marching in the town due to allegations of sectarian conduct and paramilitary trappings.

== Demographics ==
National Identity of Ballycastle residents (2021)
Nationality	Per cent
Irish	51.2%
Northern Irish	30.1%
British	23.9%

=== 2021 census ===
At the time of the 2021 census the population of Ballycastle was 5,628. Of these:

- 75.5% were from a Catholic and 18.3% were from a Protestant or other Christian background.

=== 2011 census ===
At the time of the 2011 UK census the population of Ballycastle was 5,237. Of these:

- 20.2% were aged under 16 years and 17.5% were aged 65 and over
- 47.5% of the population were male and 52.5% were female
- 77.1% were from a Catholic and 19.0% were from a Protestant or other Christian background
- 7.1% of people aged 16–74 were unemployed

== Governance ==
The town is located within The Glens district electoral area (DEA) of the Causeway Coast and Glens Borough Council. In the 2019 Causeway Coast and Glens Borough Council election, the residents of this DEA elected 2 Sinn Féin, 1 SDLP, 1 UUP and 1 Independent representatives to the council.

== Places of interest ==
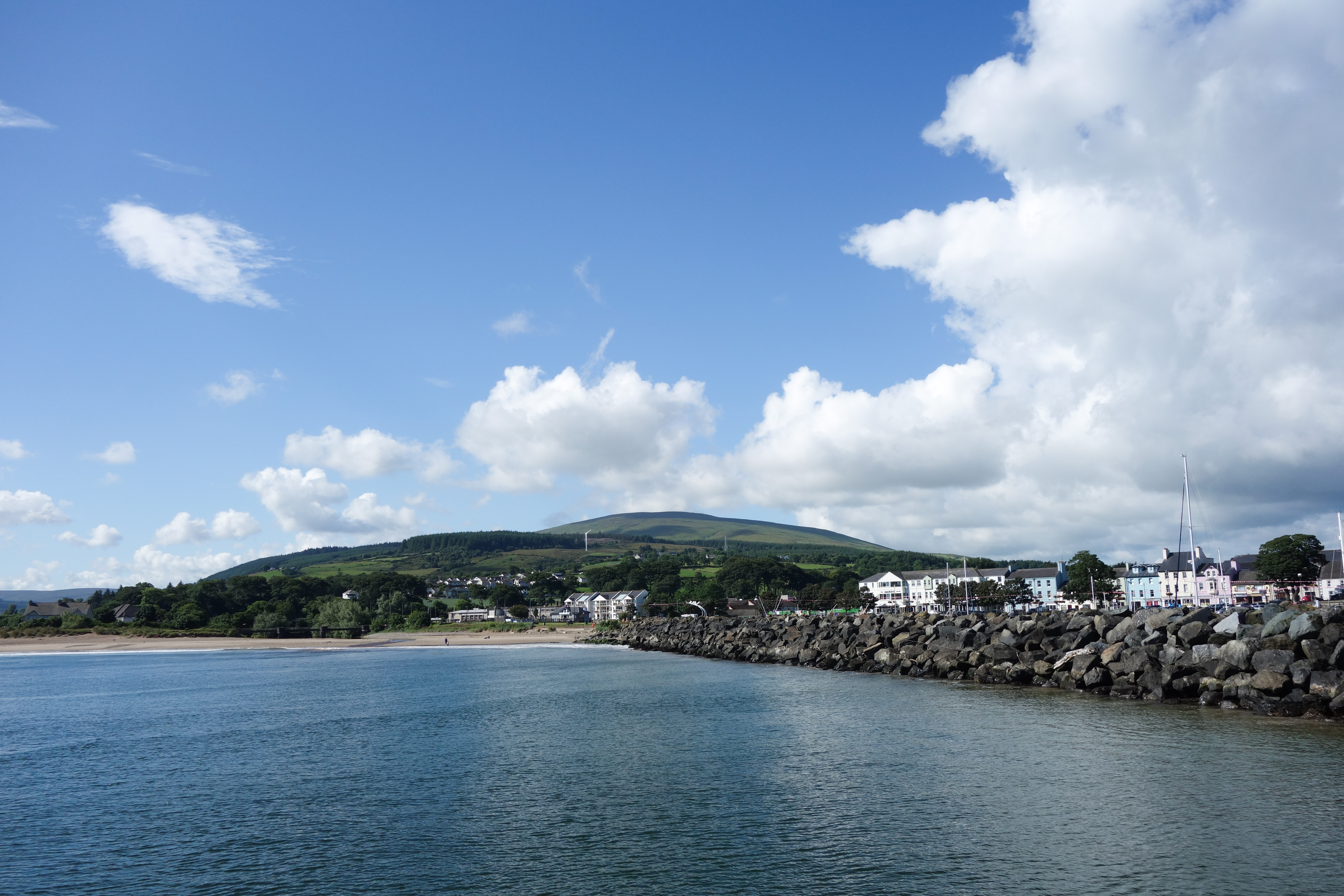
View from the Rathlin boat

The Ould Lammas Fair, historically a lamb sale, has now become a street get together with market stalls, busking and street performers, attracting upwards of sixty thousand people each year. The fair is normally held Bank holiday Monday and Tuesday at end of August based on the fact that fairs were always held on last Tuesday of the month. (When the bank holiday is the last day of August the fair occurs a week earlier.)

- Fair Head is a headland near Ballycastle that rises 196 metres (643 ft) out of the bay. There is a man-made Iron Age crannóg in the middle of a large lake at the top.
- Knocklayde, a heather-covered mountain with a height of 1,685 feet (514 m), is crowned by Carn na Truagh (the Cairn of Sorrow), and has views over Ballycastle, Rathlin Island, Fair Head, and Scotland.
- Glentaisie, the most northerly of the nine Glens of Antrim ('the Glynns'), lies at the foot of Knocklayde mountain. It is named after the Princess Taisie, the daughter of King Dorm of Rathlin Island. According to legend, Taisie, renowned for her great beauty, was betrothed to Congal, heir to the Kingdom of Ireland. The King of Norway also sought her hand in marriage, and when he arrived to claim his bride, her wedding celebrations to Congal had begun. The king and his army tried to capture Taisie, but in the subsequent battle he was killed, and his army fled leaderless and empty-handed.
- The Carey, Glenshesk and Tow Rivers flow down from the Glens into the Margy River. It then flows into the Moyle Sea at the start of the Strand.
- The Strand's Ballycastle Beach is designated a Blue Flag beach.
- Pans Rocks, which are the remains of an iron salt pan lying at the far end of Ballycastle Beach, jut out into the sea and are a popular spot for fishing.

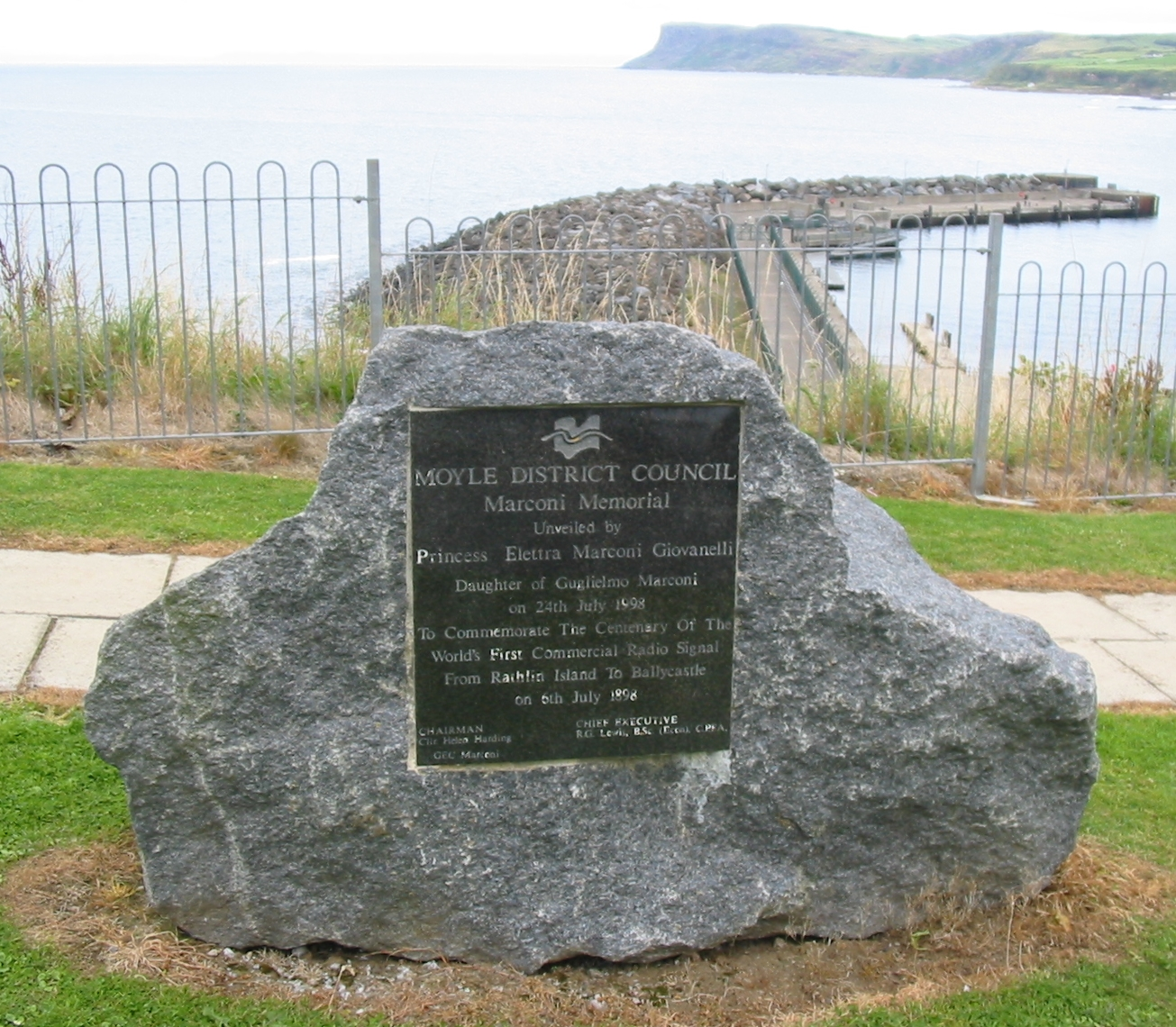
The Marconi memorial

- The Devils Churn, lying just beyond Pans Rocks, has steps carved into the stone leading to an underwater tunnel.
- Clare Park on Clare Road, was an estate owned by the then-local landed gentry, the McGildownys. The 17th-century house has been pulled down but it was set in a site high up on the Antrim coast.
- The Corrymeela Community (a Christian organisation promoting peace and reconciliation, founded in 1965) is based at Corrymeela, just outside Ballycastle.
- Overlooking the harbour, there is a monument to Guglielmo, 1st Marchese Marconi, whose employees made the world's first commercial wireless telegraph transmission between Ballycastle and the East Lighthouse on Rathlin Island. Marconi was created a Marchese by King Vittorio Emanuele III of Italy in 1929.
- Close to the beach, there is a sculpture of the Children of Lir. According to the legend, the children were cursed to spend 300 years on the Sea of Moyle, upon which Ballycastle is a coastal town.

== Buildings of note ==
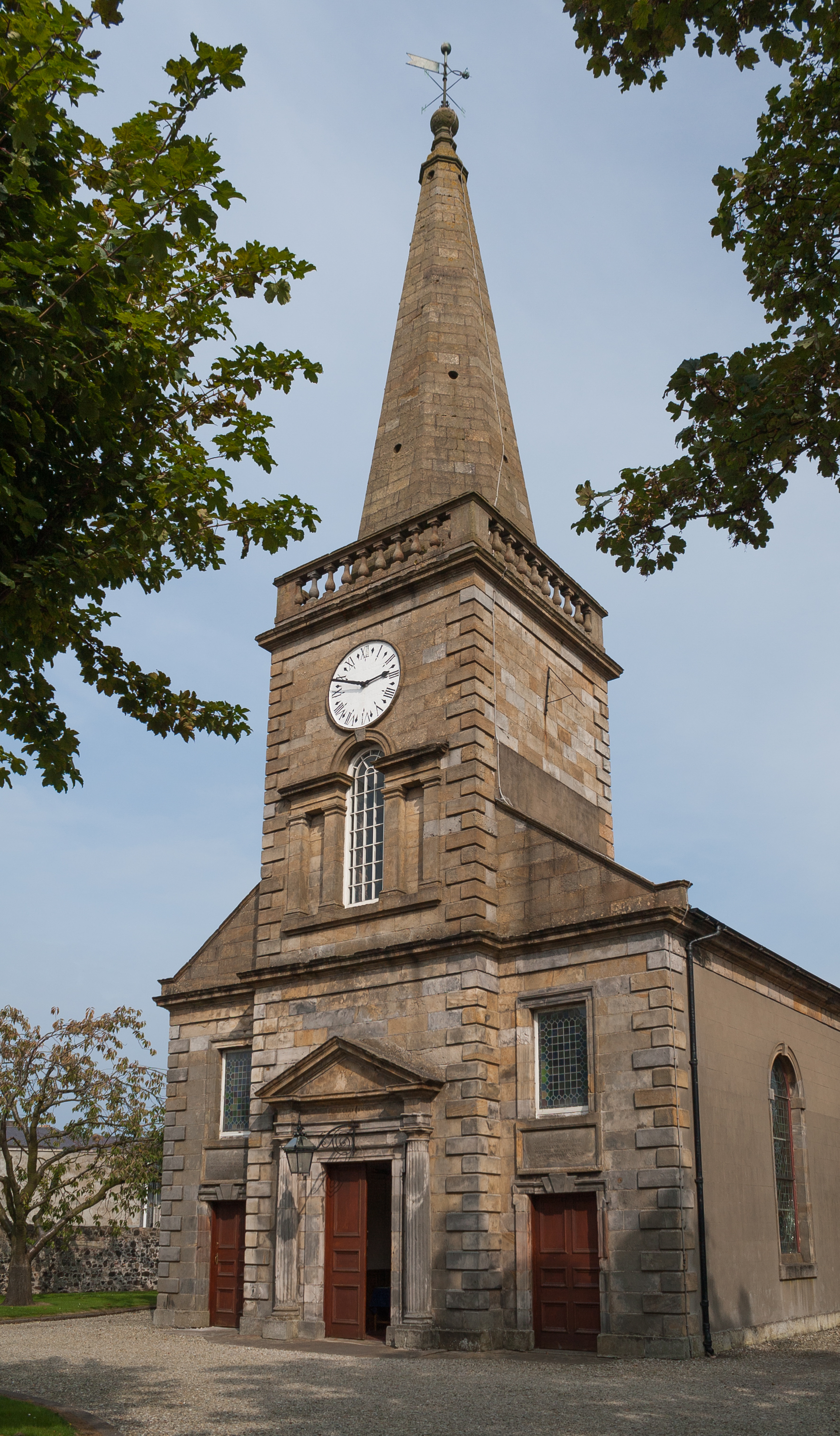
Church of the Holy Trinity

- St Patrick's and St Brigid's Church is a Catholic church located on Moyle Road. Known locally as 'the Chapel', it was initially designed by Fr. Jeremiah McAuley who also designed St. Peter's Cathedral in Belfast. It was erected in 1870. An octagonal spire was added in 1898 and there were further alterations in 1993. The spire was used as a mast by Marconi to send the first radio broadcast to Rathlin Island in 1898.
- Holy Trinity Parish Church is a Church of Ireland church in The Diamond, Ballycastle's main square. Like the rest of The Diamond, the church is Grade 'A' listed. Built by Colonel Hugh Boyd, who bore the total cost, the church was completed in 1756 and is popularly known as Boyd's Church. It was built in Graeco-Italian style with an apse-shaped chancel, and an octagonal spire about 100 feet (30 m) high. It was effectively a chapel for the Boyd family and its estate for many years. The remains of many Boyd descendants are in the vaults below – although it was always subject to Episcopal jurisdiction. It was given to the Church of Ireland in about 1950. The church is open every day from 9am-5pm.
- Bonamargy Friary is off the Cushendall Road on the approach to Ballycastle and is a late Franciscan foundation established in 1485 by Rory MacQuillan. Locked vaults hold the remains of the celebrated chieftain, Sorley Boy MacDonnell, and several of the Earls of Antrim.
- Dunaneeny Castle is a ruined castle located on the cliffs overlooking Ballycastle Bay. Built by Alexander MacDonnell, the castle was also the birthplace of Sorley Boy MacDonnell.
- Kinbane Castle is on a headland projecting into the sea, about 3 miles (5 km) from Ballycastle on the road to Ballintoy. Originally a two-storey building, it was built in 1547 by Colla MacDonnell, who died within its walls in 1558.
- The Ballycastle Presbyterian Church located in Castle Street has a distinctive round tower.

== Transport ==
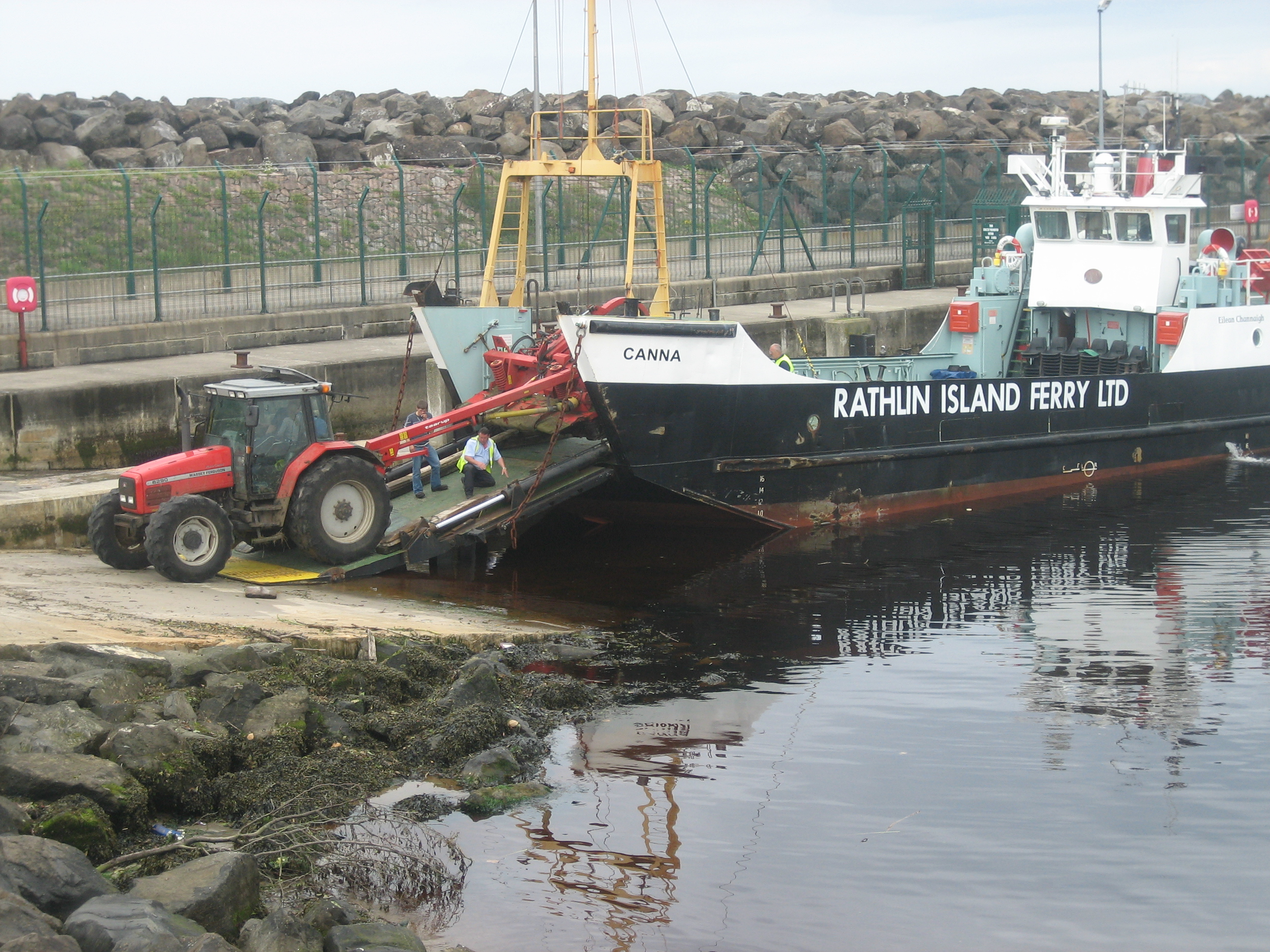
Rathlin Island Ferry, Ballycastle Harbour

Bus services in Ballycastle are operated by Translink.

A ferry runs between the town and Rathlin Island as part of a lifeline service. Since 2008 this ferry has been operated by the Rathlin Island Ferry Ltd but previously it had been operated by Caledonian MacBrayne beginning in 1996.

A passenger ferry service to Campbeltown on Scotland's Kintyre peninsula, and Port Ellen on Islay, operated by Kintyre Express, runs seven days during summer months and only on Mondays and Fridays during winter months. Sea Containers Ltd previously ran a ferry from Ballycastle to Campbeltown from 1997 to June 2002.

Ballycastle railway station opened on 18 October 1880 on the Ballycastle Railway, a narrow-gauge railway which ran for 17 miles (27 km). The railway ran from Ballycastle to Ballymoney station, a station on the Belfast and Northern Counties Railway (BNCR), later Northern Counties Committee (NCC) and now part of Northern Ireland Railways.

== Climate ==
As with the rest of Northern Ireland, Ballycastle experiences a maritime climate with cool summers and mild winters. The nearest official Met Office weather station for which online records are available is at Ballypatrick Forest, about 4 miles (6.4 km) east-southeast of Ballypatrick.

Climate data for Ballypatrick Forest WMO ID: 03916; coordinates 55°10′50″N 6°09′16″W; elevation: 156 m (512 ft); 1991–2020 normals, extremes 1961–present
Month	Jan	Feb	Mar	Apr	May	Jun	Jul	Aug	Sep	Oct	Nov	Dec	Year
Record high °C (°F)	13.8 (56.8)	14.9 (58.8)	18.9 (66.0)	20.2 (68.4)	23.5 (74.3)	26.6 (79.9)	28.4 (83.1)	25.8 (78.4)	23.1 (73.6)	21.1 (70.0)	16.1 (61.0)	14.4 (57.9)	28.4 (83.1)
Mean daily maximum °C (°F)	6.9 (44.4)	7.2 (45.0)	8.6 (47.5)	10.6 (51.1)	13.3 (55.9)	15.6 (60.1)	17.0 (62.6)	16.9 (62.4)	15.3 (59.5)	12.2 (54.0)	9.2 (48.6)	7.3 (45.1)	11.7 (53.1)
Daily mean °C (°F)	4.6 (40.3)	4.7 (40.5)	5.8 (42.4)	7.5 (45.5)	9.9 (49.8)	12.3 (54.1)	13.9 (57.0)	13.9 (57.0)	12.4 (54.3)	9.7 (49.5)	6.9 (44.4)	5.1 (41.2)	8.9 (48.0)
Mean daily minimum °C (°F)	2.4 (36.3)	2.3 (36.1)	3.0 (37.4)	4.4 (39.9)	6.4 (43.5)	9.0 (48.2)	10.8 (51.4)	10.9 (51.6)	9.5 (49.1)	7.2 (45.0)	4.6 (40.3)	2.8 (37.0)	6.1 (43.0)
Record low °C (°F)	−11.8 (10.8)	−8.2 (17.2)	−8.8 (16.2)	−4.6 (23.7)	−3.6 (25.5)	−0.4 (31.3)	0.1 (32.2)	1.1 (34.0)	−1.0 (30.2)	−1.8 (28.8)	−6.3 (20.7)	−9.8 (14.4)	−11.8 (10.8)
Average precipitation mm (inches)	131.6 (5.18)	106.4 (4.19)	97.2 (3.83)	80.3 (3.16)	80.0 (3.15)	85.8 (3.38)	97.6 (3.84)	109.1 (4.30)	99.5 (3.92)	142.9 (5.63)	149.5 (5.89)	145.9 (5.74)	1,325.7 (52.19)
Average precipitation days (≥ 1.0 mm)	18.8	16.2	16.2	13.9	13.5	13.8	15.7	15.9	15.3	17.8	19.5	18.8	195.5
Mean monthly sunshine hours	42.5	70.4	98.8	165.4	202.5	162.5	146.5	146.5	112.2	90.8	50.7	31.7	1,320.3
Source: Met Office

== Sport ==
Sports of local interest include tennis, bowling (Mary Street), hurling, camogie, Gaelic football, (Whitehall/Leyland Road), soccer, golf, quidditch and skateboarding.There is additionally a local pool league between the various pubs in the town.

=== Golf ===
Ballycastle Golf Club offers an 18-hole championship course open year-round to both members and non-members. The course is one of the four courses played each June in the world-renowned Causeway Coast Golf Tournament.

=== Tennis ===
During the summer, the town hosts two tennis tournaments, one of which is run by the Moyle District Council.

=== Association Football ===
Ballycastle United Football Club combined with Moyle FC in 2011, and the team now competes in the Coleraine and District morning league.

=== Bowls ===
Ballycastle Bowling Club has a scenic outdoors setting that is a feature of the town's sea-front.

== Notable people ==
=== 1500s ===
- Sorley Boy MacDonnell (c.1505–1590) – Scottish-Irish prince, born at Dunanynie Castle near Ballycastle
- Gillaspick MacDonnell (c.1550–1571) – nephew of Sorley Boy MacDonnell, killed accidentally in 1571 at Ballycastle.

=== 1600s ===
- The 1st Viscount Longford and 17th Baron Slane (1669–1726) – politician. Lord Longford, known for much of his life as Lord Slane, is buried in the MacDonnell family vault in Bonamargy Friary, Ballycastle, the burial place of the Earls of Antrim.

=== 1700s ===
- Hugh Boyd (1746–1794) – writer
- John Surman Carden (1771–1858) – officer of the British Royal Navy, died in Ballycastle
- Hugh M'Neile (1795–1879) – controversial anti-Roman Catholic preacher

=== 1800s ===
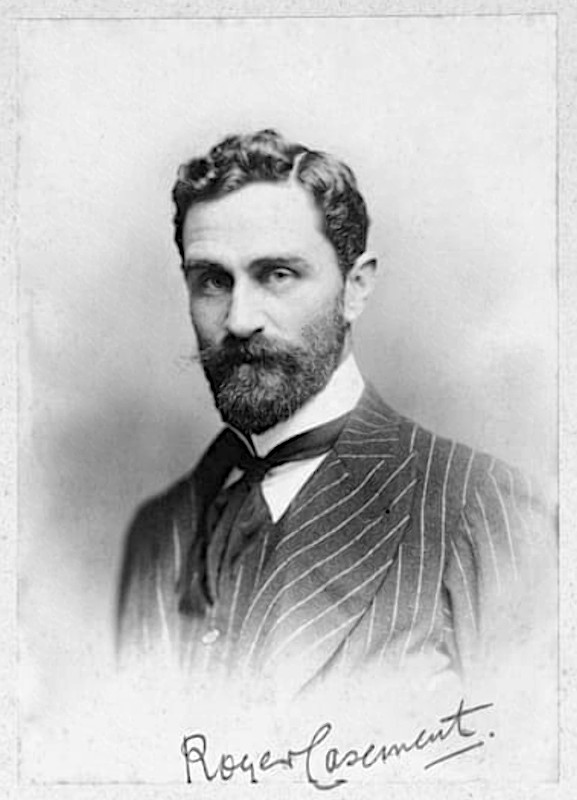
Sir Roger Casement

- John Samuel Bewley Monsell (1811–1875) – clergyman and hymnwriter
- Thomas Witherow (1824–1890) – Presbyterian minister and historian.
- Sir Roger Casement (1864–1916) – writer and Irish Republican revolutionary who was born and raised in Dublin to a father from Ballycastle.
- Dame Louise McIlroy (1874–1968) – medical doctor, born near Ballymena, father was a general practitioner in Ballycastle
- Robert Quigg 1885–1955) – soldier and recipient of the Victoria Cross

=== 1900s ===
- Helen Megaw (1907–2002) – crystallographer
- Donal Lamont (1911–2003) – Bishop of Mutare, Zimbabwe, nominated for the Nobel Peace Prize in 1978
- Michael Dallat (1925–2000) – Titular Bishop of Thala, Tunisia and Auxiliary Bishop of Diocese of Down and Connor
- Keith Cardinal O'Brien (1938–2018) – he served as Archbishop of St Andrews and Edinburgh, 1985–2013. Cardinal O'Brien was effectively the head of the Catholic Church in Scotland from the death of Thomas Cardinal Winning, Archbishop of Glasgow, in June 2001 until his own resignation as Archbishop of St Andrews and Edinburgh in February 2013. He was created a Cardinal in October 2003.
- David McWilliams (1945–2002) – folksinger and musician
- Conleth Hill (b. 1964) – actor

== See also ==
- Market houses in Northern Ireland
- List of localities in Northern Ireland by population
