= Randal MacDonnell =

Randal MacDonnell or McDonnell may refer to:

- Randal MacSorley MacDonnell (d. 1636), 1st Earl of Antrim, son of Sorley Boy MacDonnell
- Randal MacSorley MacDonnell (1609–1683), Marquess of Antrim, 2nd Earl of Antrim, and son of the 1st Earl of Antrim
- Randal MacDonnell (1680–1721), 4th Earl of Antrim and nephew of the Marquess of Antrim
- Randal William MacDonnell (1749–1791), Marquess of Antrim, 5th and 1st Earl of Antrim, and son of the 4th Earl of Antrim
- Randal John Somerled McDonnell (1911–1977), 8th Earl of Antrim, diplomat, activist, soldier, administrator from Northern Ireland, and great-great grandson of the 5th and 1st Earl of Antrim
- Randal Alexander McDonnell, 10th Earl of Antrim (b. 1967), Scottish landowner and grandson of the 8th Earl of Antrim
