= Alexander MacDonnell, 3rd Earl of Antrim =

Irish earl (1615–1699)

Alexander MacDonnell
- Earl of Antrim
- Tenure: 1683–1699
- Predecessor: Randal, 1st Marquess
- Successor: Randal, 4th Earl
- Born: 1615
- Died: June 1699 (aged 83–84)
- Buried: Holywell, Flintshire, Wales
- Spouses: 1. Elizabeth Annesley; 2. Helena Burke
- Issue Detail: Randal & Mary
- Father: Randal MacDonnell, 1st Earl
- Mother: Alice O'Neill

Alexander MacDonnell, 3rd Earl of Antrim PC (Ire) (1615 – June 1699) was a Catholic peer and military commander in Ireland. He fought together with his brother Randal on the losing side in the Irish Confederate Wars (1641–1653); and then, having succeeded his brother as the 3rd Earl of Antrim in 1683, fought in the Williamite War (1688–1691), on the losing side again. Twice he forfeited his lands and twice he regained them.

However, he may be known best for having been shut out of Derry by the apprentice boys in an episode preceding the Siege of Derry.

== Birth and origins ==
Family tree

Alexander MacDonnell with his two wives, his parents, and other selected relatives. (Note: Also see the lists of children in the text.)

Sorley Boy; MacDonnell d. 1590 | Mary; O'Neill | Hugh; O'Neill c. 1550 – 1616 | Siobhan; O'Donnell d. 1591
Randal; 1st Earl; 1769–1636 | Alice; O'Neill; 1583–1665
Randal; 1st Marquess; 1609–1682 | Elizabeth; Annesley d. 1672 | Alexander; 3rd Earl; 1615–1699 | Helena; Burke d. 1710
Randal; 4th Earl; 1680–1721 | Rachel; Skeffington d. 1739
Alexander; 5th Earl; 1713–1775 | Anne; Plunket d. 1755

Legend

| XXX | Subject of the article | XXX | Earls & marquesses of Antrim |

Alexander was born in 1615, probably at Dunluce Castle, his parents' habitual residence. He was the second son of Randal MacDonnell and his wife, Alice O'Neill. His father, Lord of the Route and Constable of Dunluce Castle, had been knighted by Lord Deputy Mountjoy in 1602. His father would be created Viscount of Antrim in 1617 and advanced to Earl in 1620. His father's family, the MacDonnell of Antrim, were the Irish branch of the Scottish Clan Donald. The MacDonnels descended from the twelfth-century Scottish warlord Somerled and from Alexander MacDonald, 5th of Dunnyveg, a Scottish-Irish magnate, who was driven out of Scotland by James IV and fled to Ulster where the family was already established through marriages and owned much land in the north-eastern corner of Ireland facing Scotland across the North Channel. His Scottish lands were taken over by the rival Clan Campbell, although the MacDonalds continued to live there and looked towards the MacDonnell family for leadership. Recovering his Scottish lands remained an objective that his father pursued all his life without ever making any progress toward it.

Alexander's mother was described as "of good cheerful aspect, freckled, not tall but strong, well set, and acquainted with the English tongue." She was born in 1583 as the daughter of Hugh O'Neill, Earl of Tyrone, and his second wife, Siobhan (i.e. Johanna) O'Donnell. (Note: In the Dictionary of National Biography (DNB), Dunlop (1898) claims that Alice is a daughter of Hugh's fourth wife, but this seems impossible as her birth date falls into the time of Hugh's second marriage. In the Oxford Dictionary of National Biography, an update to the DNB, Canny (2004) mentions neither Alice nor Randall MacDonnell.) She was thus a member of the O'Neill dynasty, an ancient Gaelic family, the leaders of which were once kings and ruled all of Ulster. However, her father had left Ireland in the Flight of the Earls in 1607 and was then attainted by the Irish Parliament, losing his title and lands.

Alexander's parents were both Catholic. They had married in 1604 before the Flight of the Earls. He was one of eight siblings. who are listed in his father's article.

== Early life ==
On 28 May 1618 King James I of England created Alexander's father Viscount Dunluce and in 1620 Earl of Antrim.

== Glenarm inheritance ==
On 10 December 1636 Alexander's father died at Dunluce Castle and was buried at the Bonamargy Franciscan Friary. In his will he had divided his estate between his two sons. Alexander inherited the Barony of Glenarm, whereas the elder, Randal, inherited the title and the larger share of the land, consisting of the baronies of Dunluce and Kilconway. Alexander MacDonnell was precisely 21 at that time. He, therefore, entered immediately into the possession of his part of the estate. He made Glenarm Castle on the east coast of County Antrim his residence.

== Irish Wars ==
After coming of age, Alexander MacDonnell spent three years travelling in Europe on his grand tour. He returned to Ireland just before the outbreak of the Irish Rebellion of 1641, in which he sided with the rebels and commanded a regiment in what would soon become the Confederate Ulster army.

In November 1643 the Supreme Council appointed seven delegates, Muskerry, Alexander MacDonnell, Robert Talbot, Nicholas Plunkett, Dermot O'Brien, Geoffrey Browne, and Richard Martin, to submit grievances to the king and negotiate a peace treaty. In January 1644 they obtained save-conducts from the Lords Justice, Sir Henry Tichborne and John Borlase. It must have been their last days in office as Ormond was appointed and sworn lord lieutenant of Ireland on 21 January 1644. The delegates arrived on 24 March 1644 at Oxford where the king held his court. Lord Muskerry was the leader of the delegation. He demanded free exercise of the Catholic religion, independence of the Irish Parliament from that of England, and oblivion for their rebellion. However, the arrival of a competing Irish Protestant delegation on 17 April 1644 prevented the King from making such concessions and no peace treaty was signed.

Colonel Alexander MacDonnell, as he now was, led the regiment throughout the Irish Confederate Wars until the Confederation surrendered to Cromwell in 1652. Unlike his brother Randal, Alexander respected and adhered to the peace between the Confederates and the Royalists negotiated by Ormond in 1648 and urged for a conciliatory approach. His lands were confiscated in 1652 in Cromwell's Act of Settlement and distributed among Cromwellian soldiers. In exchange he received 3,500 acres in Connacht. By 1656, he was living in England.

== Restoration ==
At the Restoration in 1660, he was appointed custos rotulorum for Antrim. In 1668 Alexander MacDonnell was restored to his lands by Charles II.

== Marriages ==
=== First marriage ===
In 1665, about 50 years old, MacDonnell married his first wife, Elizabeth Annesley. She was the second daughter of Arthur Annesley, 1st Earl of Anglesey, a Protestant. The union was childless. She died on 4 September 1672.

=== Second marriage and children ===
After 1672 at the age of about 60, Antrim married, secondly, Helena Burke, daughter of Sir John Burke of Derrymaclaughna (Doire-mic-Lachtna), County Galway.

Alexander and Helena had two children (the birth order is unknown):

- Randal (1680–1721), succeeded as the 4th Earl;
- Mary, married Henry Wells of Bambridge in 1700.

== Earl of Antrim ==
On 3 February 1683 his only brother, Randal, died childless. Randal had married twice, but both marriages were childless. The marquessate became extinct and Randal was therefore the first and last Marquess of Antrim of the 1645 creation. Alexander succeeded him in the earldom as the 3rd Earl of Antrim.

In 1685, Lord Antrim, as he was now, was invested as a Privy Counsellor and Lord-Lieutenant of Antrim shortly after the accession of King James II, as the new king followed a policy of replacing Protestant officials with Catholic ones throughout Ireland.

== Williamite War ==
At the outbreak of the Glorious Revolution, which replaced James II with William of Orange, Antrim was already in his seventies. He stayed loyal to James. When the Dutch invasion threatened, James ordered Richard Talbot, Earl of Tyrconnell, whom James had appointed viceroy of Ireland, to send reliable Irish troops to England. These units sailed to Chester in September and early October 1688. To replace these units, Tyrconnell ordered four new regiments to be raised, one for each Irish province. The Ulster regiment was to be raised by Antrim. He hired 1,200 Scottish mercenaries (i.e. redshanks), making sure they were all Catholics. The unit was supposed to be ready on 20 November, but delays occurred.

At that time Tyrconnell's remodelling of the Irish army had advanced so far that few units still had significant numbers of Protestant soldiers. One of those was the regiment of Viscount Mountjoy, a Protestant loyal to James. This unit was in the garrison at Derry. Tyrconnell considered this unit unreliable and on 23 November he ordered Mountjoy to march to Dublin, supposedly for embarking to England. Mountjoy's regiment was to be replaced by Antrim's, but that was not ready and Derry found itself without a garrison.

When Antrim finally got his troops on the way, he met Colonel George Philips, a Protestant, at Newtown Limavady, who immediately sent a messenger to Derry to warn the city. On 7 December 1688, with Antrim's regiment on the Waterside of Derry, ready to cross the Foyle River under the Ferryquay Gate, thirteen apprentices seized the city keys and locked the gates. With this Derry was in rebellion against Tyrconnell and James. Antrim was not strong enough to take the town by force and retreated to Coleraine.

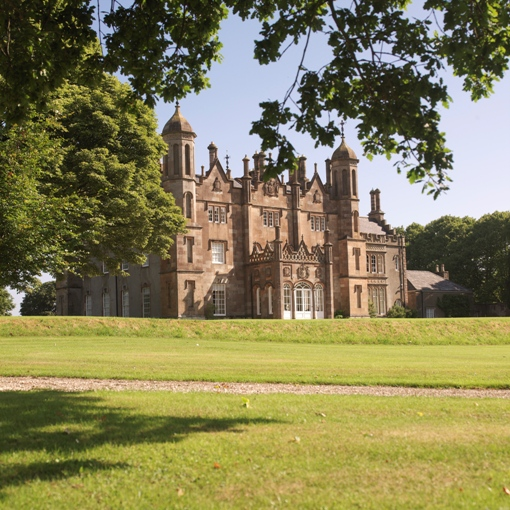
MacDonnell's residence Glenarm Castle in County Antrim as it looks today.

When Tyrconnell heard that Antrim had been kept out of Derry, he stopped Mountjoy on his march to Dublin and sent him back to Derry. On 21 December Mountjoy reached Derry and struck a deal with the city, according to which two of his companies, consisting entirely of Protestant soldiers, would be let into town. The one was commanded by Lieutenant-Colonel Robert Lundy, the other by Captain William Stewart. (Note: William Stewart was the grandfather of the first Marquess of Londonderry.) Both later swore allegiance to William. Mountjoy appointed Lundy as governor of the town in place of Philips.

Antrim sat in the House of Lords of James II's Patriot Parliament in Dublin.

James lost the Williamite War in Ireland with the fall of Limerick in 1691. Antrim, as a supporter of James, was one of the losers. Peace was signed with the Treaty of Limerick according to which all the members of the Irish landed gentry having served in the Jacobite Army who did not immediately swear allegiance to William and Mary would forfeit their title and lands. Antrim seems to have missed his chance in 1691 and not have sworn allegiance to William immediately after the signing of the treaty. However, he seems to have obtained a pardon at a later stage and did regain possession of his lands.

== Death, succession, and timeline ==
Alexander MacDonnell, 3rd Earl of Antrim, died in June 1699 and was buried at Holywell, Flintshire, Wales. (Note: Authors agree that the 3rd earl died in 1699, but differ on the month and day: 10 December or June. The latter is preferred.) He was succeeded by his son Randal as the 4th Earl of Antrim.

Timeline
As only the year, but not the day, of his birth is known, all the ages could be a year younger than given.
| Age | Date | Event |
| 0 | 1615 | Born. |
| 2–3 | 1618, 28 May | Father created Viscount Dunluce. |
| 4–5 | 1620, 12 Dec | Father created Earl of Antrim. |
| 9–10 | 1625, 27 Mar | Accession of King Charles I, succeeding King James I |
| 20–21 | 1636, 10 Dec | His father died at Dunluce Castle, and he inherited Glenarm. |
| 25–26 | 1641, 23 Oct | Outbreak of the Rebellion |
| 33–34 | 1649, 30 Jan | King Charles I beheaded. |
| 44–45 | 1660, 29 May | Restoration of King Charles II |
| 49–50 | 1665 | Married as 1st wife Elizabeth Annesley. |
| 56–57 | 1672, 4 Sep | 1st wife died. |
| 59–60 | 1675 estimate | Married 2ndly Helena Burke, daughter of Sir John Burke of Derrymaclaughna, County Galway. |
| 64–65 | 1680 | Son Randal born. |
| 67–68 | 1683, 3 Feb | Succeeded his only brother as the 3rd Earl of Antrim. |
| 69–70 | 1685, 6 Feb | Accession of King James II, succeeding King Charles II |
| 69–70 | 1685 | Became a member of the Privy Council of Ireland. |
| 72–73 | 1688, 7 Dec | Shut out of Derry by the 13 apprentices. |
| 73–74 | 1689, 13 Feb | Accession of William and Mary, succeeding King James II |
| 73–74 | 1689, 12 Mar | King James II landed at Kinsale, Ireland |
| 83–84 | 1699, June | Died and was succeeded by his only son. |

== Notes and references ==
=== Sources ===
- Bagwell, Richard (1909). Ireland under the Stuarts and under the Interregnum. Vol. II. London: Longmans, Green, and Co. OCLC 458582656. – 1642 to 1660
- Barnard, Toby (2004). "Butler, James, first duke of Ormond (1610–1688)". In Matthew, Henry Colin Gray.; Harrison, Brian (eds.). Oxford Dictionary of National Biography. Vol. 9. New York: Oxford University Press. pp. 153–163. ISBN 0-19-861359-8.
- Burke, Bernard (1866). A Genealogical History of the Dormant, Abeyant, Forfeited and Extinct Peerages of the British Empire (New ed.). London: Harrison. OCLC 11501348.
- Burke, Bernard; Burke, Ashworth Peter (1915). A Genealogical and Heraldic History of the Peerage and Baronetage, the Privy Council, Knightage and Companionage (77th ed.). London: Harrison. OCLC 1155471554. – (for Antrim)
- Canny, Nicholas (2004). "O'Neill, Hugh [Aodh O'Neill], second earl of Tyrone (1583–1616)". In Matthew, Colin; Harrison, Brian (eds.). Oxford Dictionary of National Biography. Vol. 41. New York: Oxford University Press. pp. 851–856. ISBN 0-19-861391-1.
- Childs, John (2007). The Williamite Wars in Ireland 1688–1691. London: Hambledon Continuum Press. ISBN 978-1-85285-573-4. – (Preview)
- Cokayne, George Edward (1910). Gibbs, Vicary (ed.). The complete peerage of England, Scotland, Ireland, Great Britain and the United Kingdom, extant, extinct, or dormant. Vol. I (2nd ed.). London: St Catherine Press. OCLC 228661424. – Ab-Adam to Basing
- Corish, Patrick J. (1976). "Chapter XII: Ormond, Rinuccini, and the confederates". In Moody, Theodore William; Martin, F. X.; Byrne, Francis John (eds.). A New History of Ireland. Vol. III. Oxford: Oxford University Press. pp. 317–335. ISBN 978-0-19-820242-4. – 1645 to 1649
- Debrett, John (1828). Peerage of the United Kingdom of Great Britain and Ireland. Vol. II (17th ed.). London: F. C. and J. Rivington. OCLC 54499602. – Scotland and Ireland
- Dunlop, Robert (1895). "O'Neill, Hugh, third Baron of Dungannon and second Earl of Tyrone 1540?–1616". In Lee, Sidney (ed.). Dictionary of National Biography. Vol. XLII. New York: MacMillan and Co. pp. 188–196. OCLC 8544105.
- Fryde, Edmund Boleslaw; Greenway, D. E.; Porter, S.; Roy, I., eds. (1986). Handbook of British Chronology. Royal Historical Society Guides and Handbooks, No. 2 (3rd ed.). London: Offices of the Royal Historical Society. ISBN 0-86193-106-8. – (for timeline)
- Gardiner, Samuel Rawson (1886). History of the Great Civil War 1642–1649. Vol. I. London: Longmans, Green & Co. OCLC 874431332. – 1642 to 1644
- Graham, Rev. John (1841). Ireland Preserved; or the Siege of Londonderry and the Battle of Aughrim with Lyrical Poetry and Biographical Notes (2nd ed.). Dublin: Hardy and Walker. OCLC 00992682. – Short biographies in the biographical notes
- Hill, Rev. George (1873). An Historical Account of the MacDonnells of Antrim. Belfast: Archer & Sons. OCLC 1046037789.
- Joyce, Patrick Weston (1903). A Concise History of Ireland from the Earliest Times to 1837 (12th ed.). Dublin: M. H. Gill & Son. OCLC 815623752.
- Lodge, John (1789). Archdall, Mervyn (ed.). The Peerage of Ireland or, A Genealogical History of the Present Nobility of that Kingdom. Vol. I. Dublin: James Moore. OCLC 264906028. – Blood royal, dukes, earls (for Antrim)
- Macaulay, Thomas Babington (1855). The History of England from the Accession of James the Second. Vol. III. London: Longman Brown Greens & Longmans. OCLC 1046525672. – 1689 to 1690
- Meehan, Rev. Charles Patrick (1870). The Fate and Fortunes of Hugh O'Neill, Earl of Tyrone. and Rory O'Donel, Earl of Tyrconnel; their Flight from Ireland and Death in Exile (2nd ed.). Dublin: James Duffy. OCLC 17958027.
- Meehan, Rev. Charles Patrick (1882). The Confederation of Kilkenny (New revised and enlarged ed.). Dublin: James Duffy. OCLC 224157081.
- Ó Siochrú, Micheál (October 2009). McGuire, James; Quinn, James (eds.). "MacDonnell, Alexander". Dictionary of Irish Biography.
- Warner, Ferdinand (1768). History of the Rebellion and Civil-War in Ireland. Vol. I. Dublin: James William. OCLC 82770539. – 1641 to 1643
- Webb, Alfred (1878). "O'Neill, Hugh, Earl of Tyrone". Compendium of Irish Biography. Dublin: M. H. Gill & Son. pp. 410–416. OCLC 122693688.
- Witherow, Thomas (1879). Derry and Enniskillen in the Year 1689. London & Belfast: William Mallan & Son. OCLC 82779901.

Peerage of Ireland
| Preceded by Randal McDonnell | Earl of Antrim; 1682–1699 | Succeeded by Randal McDonnell |
