= Rose MacDonnell, Marchioness of Antrim =

Rose MacDonnell, Marchioness of Antrim (1631–1695) was an Irish aristocrat of the seventeenth century. Born Rose O'Neill, her father was Sir Henry O'Neill of Clandeboye, her grandfather was Shane mac Brian O'Neill and her great-grandfather was Brian mac Felim Ó Néill (died 1574), while her mother Martha Stafford was the daughter of an English-born official in Ireland Sir Francis Stafford. Unlike the majority of the Gaelic O'Neill dynasty, Rose was raised as a Protestant. She had three brothers and one sister but they were all declared insane so in 1638 when her father died she inherited Shane's Castle and his Edenduffcarrick estate in County Antrim.

She married Randal MacDonnell, Marquess of Antrim in either 1652 or 1653. In 1649 his first wife, the English Catholic Katherine Villiers, Duchess of Buckingham had died. A committed Catholic Antrim had been one of the largest and wealthiest landowners in Ireland, but his free-spending had run him heavily into debt and his problems had been compounded by the Irish Rebellion of 1641. Antrim had tried to steer a neutral course, gradually developing a role as a mediator between the Irish Royalists and the Catholic Irish Confederates as they negotiated a potential alliance. Following the Cromwellian conquest of Ireland, Antrim was left suddenly exposed and tried to gain favour with the new regime. Because she was a Protestant and brought some assets such as land in Toome to the marriage, she boosted Antrim's credit with the Cromwellian authorities.

Although her husband was initially imprisoned in the Tower of London following the Restoration, he was eventually cleared of any wrongdoing and restored to his pre-war lands despite evidence of his collaboration with the Cromwell regime. Rose worked very hard to clear her husband's name, mortgaging her estates to raise money for his legal fees and wrote numerous letters to Charles II and other influential figures lobbying them on his behalf.

Her husband died in 1683. As they had no children, he was succeeded by his younger brother Alexander. Rose died on 27 April 1695 and her estate was left to her first cousin. She was buried with her parents at St Nicholas, Carrickfergus.

== Bibliography ==
- Ohlmeyer, Jane. Civil War and Restoration in the Three Kingdoms. The Career of Randall MacDonnell, Marquis of Antrim, 1609-1683. Cambridge University Press, 1993.
