= McQuillen =

McQuillen is a surname of Irish origin and related to the similar family names McQuilken, McQuillan, McQuiller and McQuilling. Notable people with the surname include:

- Bob McQuillen (1923–2014), American musician and composer
- Glenn McQuillen (1915–1989), American professional baseball player
- Kathleen E. McQuillen (born 1955), American, Pioneer of Open Heart Surgery Detroit Michigan

== See also ==
- McQuillan
