= Ellis MacDonnell, Countess of Antrim =

Irish countess (1583–1665)

Alice MacDonnell
- Countess of Antrim
- Born: Alice O'Neill; 1583
- Died: c. 1665
- Spouse: Randal, 1st Earl of Antrim
- Issue Detail: Randal, Alexander, & others
- Father: Hugh O'Neill, Earl of Tyrone
- Mother: Siobhán O'Donnell

Alice MacDonnell, Countess of Antrim (1583 – c. 1665) was an Irish aristocrat of the late Elizabethan and early Stuart eras.

== Birth and origins ==
Alice (Note: Her first name is also variously spelled as Aellis, Elice or Ellis) was born in 1583, (Note: Most sources give her a birthdate of c. 1583, though historian Paul Walsh has demonstrated that a birthdate of c. 1588 is possible.) the third daughter of Hugh O'Neill and his second wife, Siobhán O'Donnell. (Note: Dunlop believes that her mother was Catherine Magennis. Casway and Cokayne believe her mother was Siobhan O'Donnell, which, based on Alice's birthdate, is more likely, since Alice's father married Magennis in the 1590s.) Her father was Earl of Tyrone and the leading Gaelic figure in late 16th-century Ireland. He is counted as the second or the third earl. Her paternal grandfather had been Matthew O'Neill, 1st Baron Dungannon, illegitimate son but recognised successor of Conn O'Neill, 1st Earl of Tyrone. Ellis's mother was a daughter of Sir Hugh O'Donnell, king of Tyrconnell and his first wife whose name is not known.

Family tree

Ellis MacDonnell with husband, parents, and selected relatives. (Note: This family tree is based on genealogies of the MacDonnels of Antrim and the O'Neills of Tyrone.Also see the lists of children in the text.)

Conn; 1st Earl; Tyrone c. 1480 – 1559
Alexander; MacDonnell c. 1480 – 1538	Catherine	Mathew; 1st Baron; Dungannon; 1520–1558; Illegitimate, d.v.p.*	Joan; Maguire; 1558
Sorley Boy; MacDonnell d. 1590	Mary; O'Neill	Brian; 2nd Earl; Tyrone d. 1562 de jure	Hugh; 3rd Earl; Tyrone c. 1550 – 1616	Siobhan; O'Donnell d. 1591
James; MacDonnell d. 1601; Dunluce	Randal; 1st Earl; Antrim d. 1636	Alice; O'Neill; 1583–1665
Catherine; Manners; 1603–1649	Randal; 1st Marquess; 1609–1682	Rose; O'Neill d. c. 1690	Alexander; 3rd Earl; 1615–1699
Randal; 4th Earl; 1680–1721	Rachel; Skeffington d. 1739

Legend

XXX	Subject of the article	XXX	Earls & marquesses of Antrim	XXX	Earl of Tyrone	XXX	Baron; Dungannon

d.v.p. = decessit vita patris (predeceased his father).

== Tyrone's Rebellion ==
While she was a child, her father was the leader of the insurgents in Tyrone's Rebellion, also called the Nine Years' War (1594-1603). James MacDonnells, third son of Sorley Boy MacDonnell succeeded his father and supported the insurgents. However, he died in 1601 and Randal, the fourth brother and Alice's future husband became the head of the family. In August 1602 he submitted to the Lord Deputy Charles Blunt, 8th Baron Mountjoy, and changed sides. He was rewarded with most of the possessions of his father that should normally have gone to his brother's descendants.

== Marriage and children ==
In 1604 Alice married Randal MacDonnell, the fourth son of Sorley Boy MacDonnell, Lord of the Glynns and the Route. Alice was described as "of good cheerful aspect, freckled, not tall but strong, well set, and acquainted with the English tongue". Her marriage was a dynastic match that brought Tyrone into an alliance with the MacDonnells, the dominant family in northern County Antrim, who also had strong connections in Scotland. Tyrone's other children made similar marriages with leading families across Ulster. Despite being Gaelic and Catholic, Randal was a strong supporter of settling Scottish Protestants in north-eastern Ulster, anticipating the Ulster Plantation. After the Flight of the Earls in 1607, when her father fled into exile in continental Europe, Ellis's husband became the foremost Gaelic aristocrat in Ulster following.

Alice and Randal had two sons, both of whom followed their father as earls:

1. Randal MacDonnell, a leading courtier under Charles I known for his involvement in the War of the Three Kingdoms
2. Alexander MacDonnell succeeded to the title in 1683, and is best known as a Catholic leader during the Williamite Wars who had the city gates shut on him at the beginning of the Siege of Derry in 1688

—and six daughters:

1. Ann, married firstly Christopher, Lord Delvin, and secondly William Fleming, Baron of Slane
2. Mary, married firstly Lucas, 2nd Viscount Dillon, and secondly Oliver, 6th Lord Louth
3. Sarah, married firstly Neile-Oge O'Neill of Killileagh in County Antrim, secondly Charles O'Conor Sligo, and thirdly Donald Macarthy More
4. Catherine, married Edward Plunkett of Castlecor
5. Rose, married Colonel Gordon, commander of a regiment in Robert Munroe's army
6. Margaret, (died 1623) never married

== Later life and death ==
In 1607 her father Hugh O'Neill left Ireland with the Flight of the Earls. He died in Rome in 1616. On 12 December 1620, her husband was created Earl of Antrim and Alice thereby became countess. Her husband died in 1636. Alice outlived him by almost 30 years. She was still alive in 1663. According to Jane Ohlmeyer, Alice died c. 1665.
