= Randal MacSorley MacDonnell, Marquess of Antrim =

Irish marquess (1609–1683)

Randal MacDonnell
- Marquess of Antrim
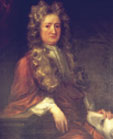
- Tenure: 1636–1683
- Predecessor: Randal, 1st Earl of Antrim
- Successor: Alexander, 3rd Earl of Antrim
- Born: 1609
- Died: 3 February 1683 (aged 74); Dunluce, Ireland
- Buried: Bonamargy Friary, Ballycastle
- Spouses: 1. Katherine Villiers; 2. Rose O'Neill
- Father: Randal, 1st Earl of Antrim
- Mother: Alice O'Neill

Randall MacDonnell, Marquess of Antrim (1609–1683) was a Roman Catholic landed magnate in Scotland and Ireland, son of the 1st Earl of Antrim. He was also chief of Clan MacDonnell of Antrim. He is best known for his involvement, mostly on the Royalist side, in the Wars of the Three Kingdoms.

== Birth and origins ==
Randal was born on 9 June 1609, probably at Dunluce Castle, his parents' habitual residence. He was the eldest son of Randal MacDonnell and his wife, Alice O'Neill. His father, Lord of the Route and Constable of Dunluce Castle, had been knighted by Lord Lieutenant Mountjoy in 1602. His father was an important landowner in the north-eastern corner of Ireland facing Scotland across the North Channel. His father's family, the MacDonnell of Antrim, were the Irish branch of the Scottish Clan Donald. The MacDonnels descended from the twelfth-century Scottish warlord Somerled and from Alexander MacDonald, 5th of Dunnyveg, a Scottish-Irish magnate, who was driven out of Scotland by James IV and fled to Ulster where the family was already established through a series of marriages. His Scottish lands were taken over by the rival Clan Campbell, although the MacDonalds continued to live there and looked towards the MacDonnell family for leadership. Recovering his Scottish lands remained an objective that his father pursued all his life without ever meeting it.

Randal's mother was described as "of good cheerful aspect, freckled, not tall but strong, well set, and acquainted with the English tongue." She was born in 1583 as the daughter of Hugh O'Neill, Earl of Tyrone and his second wife, Siobhan (i.e. Joan) O'Donnell. (Note: In the Dictionary of National Biography (DNB), Dunlop (1898) claims that Alice is a daughter of Hugh's fourth wife, but this seems impossible as her birth date falls into the time of Hugh's second marriage. In the Oxford Dictionary of National Biography, an update to the DNB, Canny (2004) mentions neither Alice nor Randall MacDonnell.) She was thus a member of the O'Neill dynasty, an ancient Gaelic family, the leaders of which were once kings and ruled all of Ulster. However, her father had left Ireland in the Flight of the Earls in 1607 and was then attainted by the Irish Parliament, losing his title and lands.

Randal's parents were both Catholic. They had married in 1604 before the Flight of the Earls. Unlike most of the Ulster Catholic elite, the MacDonnells benefited financially from the Plantation of Ulster, which brought large-scale Scottish and English settlement of Northern Ireland. In spite of this, and their good relations with their Protestant neighbours and tenants, the MacDonnell's remained staunch Catholics.

Family tree

Randal MacDonnell with his two wives, his parents, and selected relatives. (Note: Also see the list of siblings in the text.)

Sorley Boy; MacDonnell d. 1590	Mary; O'Neill	Hugh; O'Neill c. 1550 – 1616	Siobhan; O'Donnell d. 1591
Randal; 1st Earl; 1569–1636	Alice; O'Neill; 1583–1665
Catherine; Manners; 1603–1649	Randal; 1st Marquess; 1609–1683	Rose; O'Neill d. c. 1690	Alexander; 3rd Earl; 1615–1699
Randal; 4th Earl; 1680–1721	Rachel; Skeffington d. 1739
Alexander; 5th Earl; 1713–1775	Anne; Plunket d. 1755

Legend

XXX	Randal; MacDonnell	XXX	Earls & marquesses of Antrim

He appears below as the elder of two brothers:

1. Randal (1609–1683)
2. Alexander (1615–1699), succeeded him as the 3rd Earl

Randal's sisters
He had six sisters.
1. Ann, married firstly Christopher, Lord Delvin, and secondly William Fleming, Baron of Slane
2. Mary, married firstly Lucas, 2nd Viscount Dillon, and secondly Oliver, 6th Lord Louth
3. Sarah, married firstly Neile-Oge O'Neill of Killileagh in County Antrim, secondly Charles O'Conor Sligo, and thirdly Donald Macarthy More
4. Catherine, married Edward Plunkett of Castlecor
5. Rose, married Colonel Gordon, commander of a regiment in Robert Munroe's army
6. Ellis, of whom nothing seems to be known but her name

== Early life ==
On 28 May 1618 Randal's father was created Viscount Dunluce and in 1620 1st Earl of Antrim by King James I of England. By the latter creation Viscount Dunluce became a subsidiary title of the family, which was given as courtesy title to Randal, aged 11, the Earl's eldest son and heir apparent, who was therefore styled Viscount Dunluce.

Although the family was part of an increasingly Anglicised Irish elite, he was exposed to Gaelic culture, Gaelic language, and raised as a staunch Catholic. In 1613, when he was four, an arranged marriage was made for him with Lucy Hamilton, a daughter of James Hamilton, 1st Earl of Abercorn, but the wedding never took place.

=== France and England ===
In 1625 Dunluce, as he was now, travelled to France to complete his education. After two years there he went to London, where he was presented at the court of Charles I. He was described as "a tall, clean-limbed, handsome man with red hair". Dunluce spent the next ten years in England, with only occasional, brief visits to Ireland. In 1635 he began a career as a military contractor by agreeing to raise two regiments of Irish troops for service in the French army, but the plan was vetoed by the King.

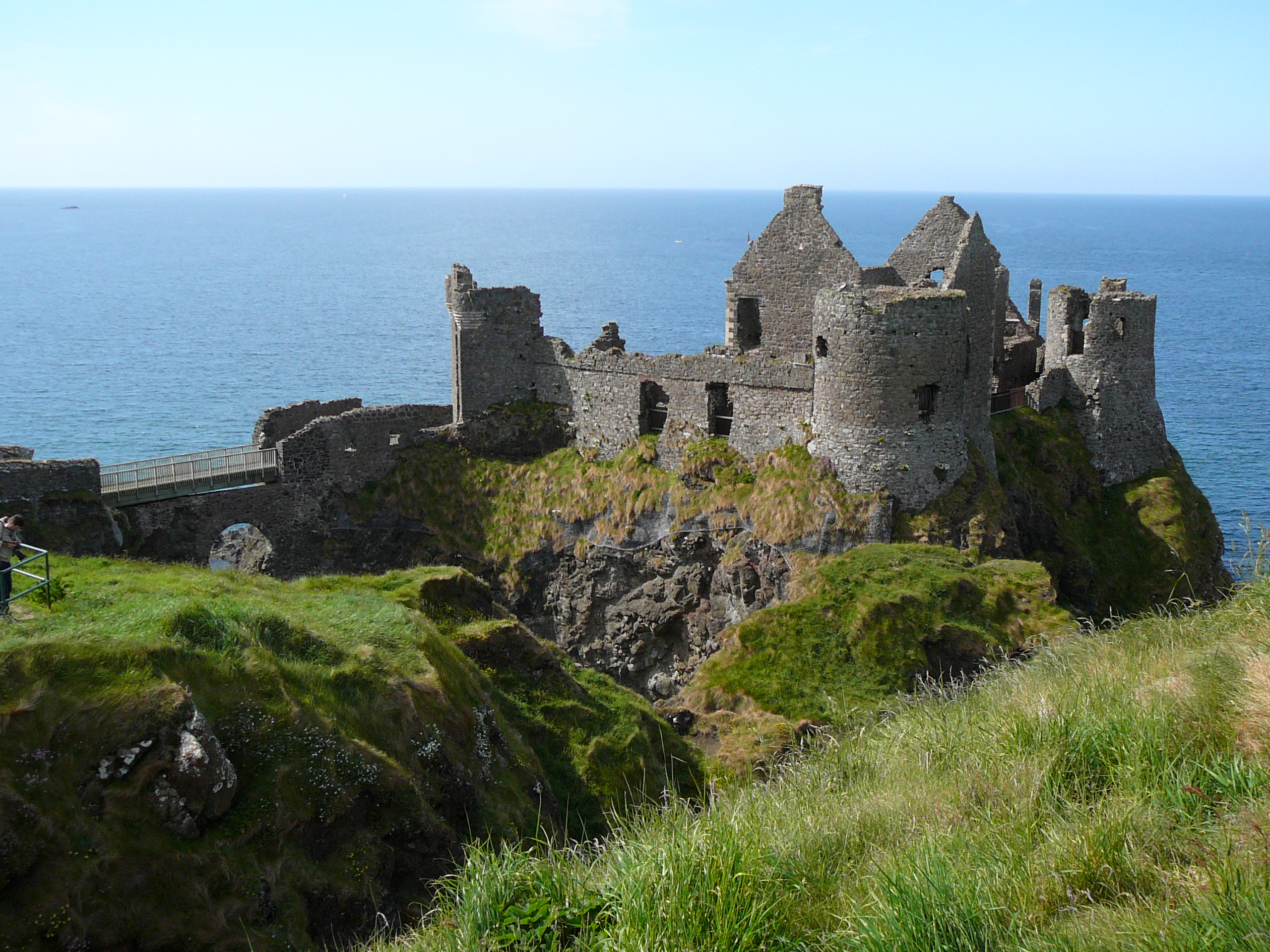
The ruin of Dunluce Castle, County Antrim, the main residence of the Marquess for much of his life.

== First marriage ==
After abandoning his long-standing fiancée Lucy Hamilton, Dunluce was linked with several other prospective marriages. In 1635 he married Katherine Manners, the widow of George Villiers, 1st Duke of Buckingham, who had been England's Chief Minister under both James I and Charles before his assassination in 1628. The Duchess was a devout Catholic and wealthy. She was close to Queen Henrietta Maria, and further enhanced Dunluce's status at court. He became friends with leading British politicians including the Earl of Nithsdale, the Duke of Lennox and the Duke of Hamilton.

Dunluce planned to acquire large amounts of land in the Londonderry Plantation, but this was blocked by Thomas Wentworth, the Lord Deputy of Ireland, who mistrusted Dunluce and was to become a major opponent of his. Dunluce also made a failed attempt to recover some of the family's traditional lands in the West of Scotland by purchasing them, but this also fell through.

Dunluce was emotionally very close to his wife and became stepfather to her children including George Villiers, 2nd Duke of Buckingham. The couple lived a lavish lifestyle, and Dunluce ran up large debts in England which troubled him for the rest of his life.

== Earl of Antrim ==
On 10 December 1636 Dunluce's father died in Dunluce Castle and was buried at the Bonamargy Franciscan Friary. Dunluce succeeded as the 2nd Earl of Antrim. In his will, his father had divided his estate between his two sons. Randal inherited the larger share of the land, consisting of the baronies of Dunluce and Kilconway, whereas Alexander, his younger brother, inherited the Barony of Glenarm.

In an effort to cut down on expenses Lord Antrim, as he was now, and his wife the countess relocated to Ireland in 1638. Antrim set up home in his family's traditional seat of Dunluce Castle as one of the wealthiest men in Ireland. He oversaw nearly 340,000 acres of land, which was mostly sublet to tenant farmers. Along with the family's traditional Scottish followers in the Western Isles, Antrim's tenants provided him with an important power base during the coming wars.

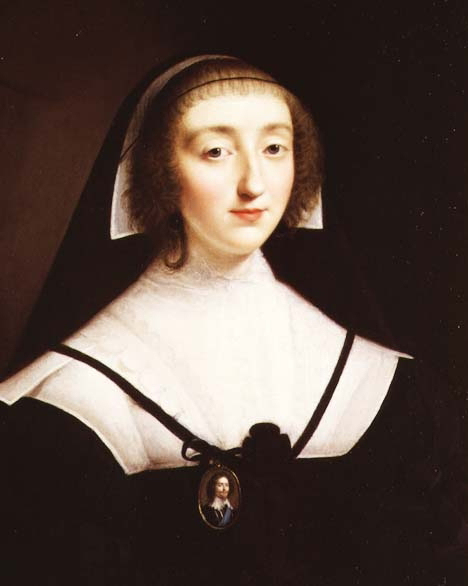
Antim's first wife Katherine Villiers, the widow of the royal favourite George Villiers, 1st Duke of Buckingham.

== Scottish crisis ==
=== Antrim Plan ===
Antrim took a close interest in Scottish politics, due to his ties to the Catholic faction of the Scottish McDonald clan who dominated Kintyre and the Western Isles. (Note: Other branches of the MacDonalds were Protestant, eg Clan MacDonald of Keppoch and Clan MacDonald of Glencoe) Charles' attempts to impose religious reforms on the Church of Scotland led to the signing of the National Covenant in 1638, and the outbreak of the Bishops' Wars in 1639. Antrim saw an opportunity both to assist the king, and also regain traditional MacDonald lands in Scotland from Archibald Campbell, 1st Marquess of Argyll, a leader of the Covenanters. He proposed raising an Irish Catholic army from his tenants in Ulster, then crossing the North Channel to link up with the Scottish MacDonalds.

The expedition was planned in conjunction with other landings and an invasion by the main English army under Charles. Its purpose was to divert Covenanter resources, while also allowing Antrim to recover Kintyre for his family. For the Irish government, the project would also prevent the Covenanters invading northern Ireland, where they enjoyed strong support amongst the Presbyterian settlers, many of whom were Scots emigrants. Antrim argued an Irish invasion of Scotland would pre-empt this threat. Nonetheless, Wentworth in Dublin was extremely sceptical about the plan. He rejected Antrim's appeals for money, supplies and weapons. Wentworth's refusal was likely due to his own plans for the regular Irish Army to launch a rival invasion from Ireland against Dumbarton and his mistrust of the Earl's motives. Eventually, Wentworth was ordered to assist Antrim by the King.

The growing crisis re-ignited the MacDonald-Campbell feud. In response, Argyll raised troops of his own in Scotland and attacked the MacDonalds who were arming in anticipation of Antrim's invasion, driving many into exile in Ireland. The threatened invasion by Irish Catholics also strengthened support in Scotland for the Covenanters, and further damaged the King's reputation there.

=== New Irish Army ===
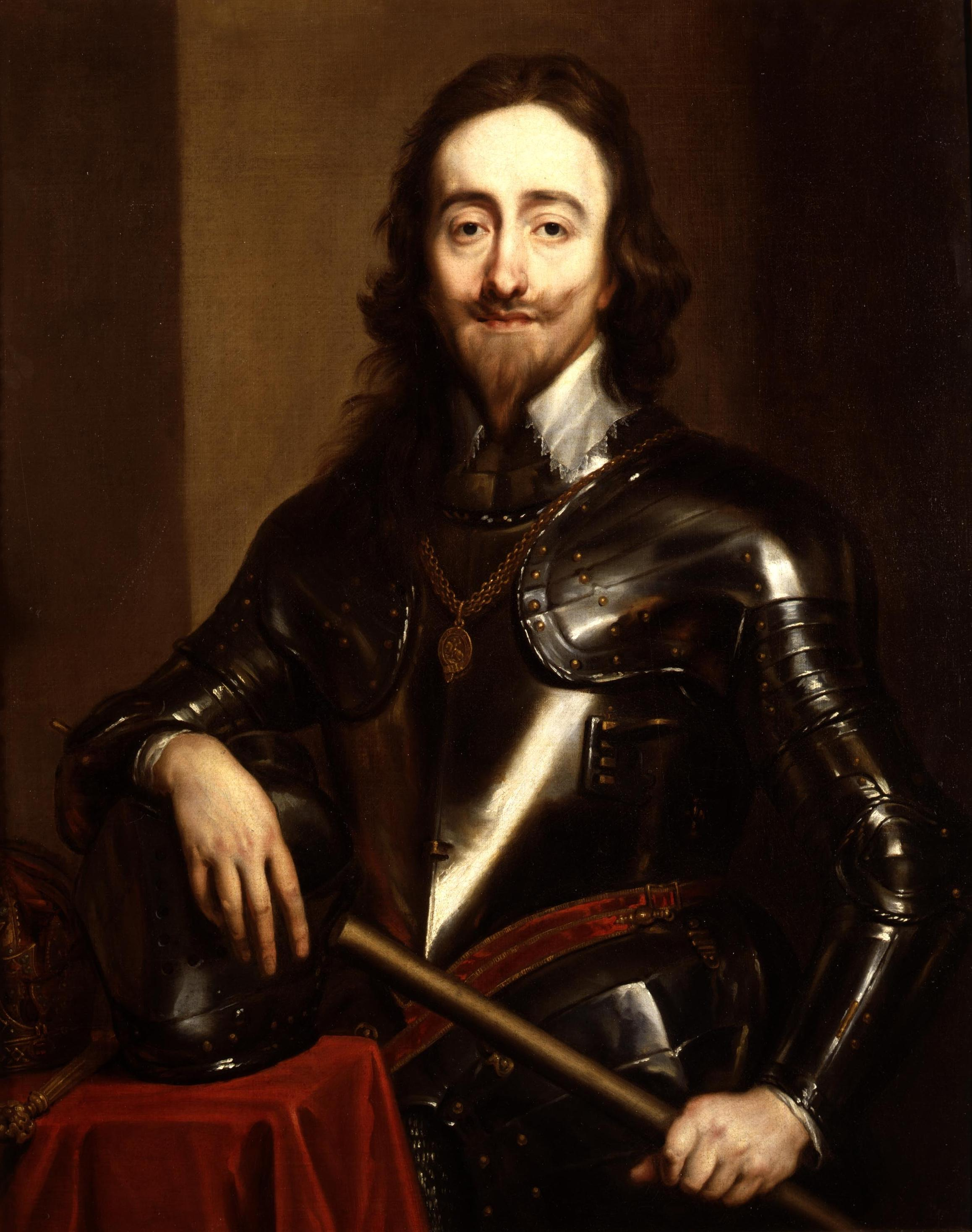
Charles I. Throughout the 1640s, Antrim attempted to raise Irish troops to assist Charles in the English Civil Wars.

Based in Carrickfergus, Antrim began raising his army in December 1638 although it wasn't until April the following year that he formally received a commission from the King authorising him to do so. Antrim recruited his army from many of the leading Gaelic families of Ulster, but Wentworth blocked a plan to import experienced Irish mercenary officers from Europe to command them. The army was raised separately from the existing standing Irish Army, which was more heavily Protestant. The army was to consist of 5,000 infantry and 200 cavalry.

Assembling the force took longer than expected, and by the time it was ready the First Scottish War had been ended by the Treaty of Berwick (1639). This settled relatively little and was closer to a ceasefire than a final agreement. A second war was widely expected, but Antrim had to postpone and then abandon his expedition. Nonetheless, sporadic fighting continued in western Scotland between local MacDonalds and Campbells. Antrim and Wentworth both blamed the other for the delays with the expedition.

In 1640, the Scottish situation flared up again and the Covenanter Army now launched an invasion of England. Antrim's planned expedition was revived, but this time Wentworth himself oversaw the recruitment of an 8,000-strong "New Irish Army" which assembled at Carrickfergus. Like Antrim's earlier force, the army was made up mainly of Irish Catholics. By this time the Scots had captured Newcastle, and were able to agree a favourable peace at the Treaty of Ripon before the Irish army had crossed to Scotland. This effectively left the new Covenanter government intact in Scotland, with Argyll one of its leading figures.

Antrim moved to Dublin during 1640, occasionally attending the Irish House of Lords and generally opposing the policies of Wentworth. In November 1640 Wentworth was recalled to London where he was impeached by Parliament and ultimately executed.

The future of the New Irish Army became a source of controversy once the Scottish crisis ended, as it was alleged that Charles I intended to ship them to England to enforce his will against the London Parliament with whom he was in dispute. Antrim's exact role remains controversial. He later claimed he was contacted by a messenger named Thomas Bourke, on the King's behalf, and encouraged to stop the New Irish Army from disbanding, to raise its strength to 20,000 and to equip it for operations in England. Antrim worked alongside other Irish supporters of the King such as Ormond and Castlehaven and kept in contact with Charles. Some of the other figures Antrim worked with at the time such as Lord Enniskillen were soon to take part in the Irish Rebellion. As the King's political situation in both England and Scotland seemed to improve in 1641, the need for Irish military intervention lessened. Nonetheless, Antrim worked hard to secure support for the King in Ireland, planning to get the Irish Parliament to declare for the King against the English Parliament should fighting break out in England.

Antrim's plan to use Ireland to solve the King's English problems was wrecked by the outbreak of the Irish Rebellion in October 1641.

The New Irish Army remained unpaid in the wake of Strafford's execution, and were waiting to be shipped abroad for foreign service.

== Irish Rebellion ==
Soon afterwards he returned to Ireland, and sought in 1641 to create a diversion, together with James Butler, 1st Duke of Ormonde, for Charles I against the parliament. He joined in his schemes Lord Slane and Sir Phelim O'Neill, later leaders of the rebellion, but on the outbreak of the Irish Rebellion of 1641 in the autumn he dissociated himself from his allies and retired to his castle at Dunluce (now in Northern Ireland). Although Sir Phelim O'Neill announced in the Proclamation of Dungannon that he had a commission from the King that authorized the rebellion, Antrim remained broadly neutral. He assisted the besieged Protestant garrison during the Siege of Coleraine, persuading his Catholic tenants to abandon the campaign and sending supplies of food to the hard-pressed inhabitants.

His suspicious conduct, however, and his Roman Catholicism, caused him to be regarded as an enemy by the English party. In May 1642 he was captured at Dunluce Castle by the Scottish Covenanter general Robert Monro, and imprisoned at Carrickfergus. Escaping thence he joined the queen at York.

In May 1643, having proceeded to Ireland to negotiate a cessation of hostilities between the English Royalists and Irish Catholic rebels, he was again captured with his papers and confined at Carrickfergus, thence once more escaping and making his way to Kilkenny, the headquarters of the Roman Catholic confederation.

He returned to Oxford in December with a scheme for raising 10,000 Irish for service in England and 2000 to join Montrose in Scotland, which through the influence of the duchess of Buckingham secured the consent of the king. On 26 January 1645 Antrim was elevated from Earl to Marquess of Antrim. He returned to Kilkenny in February, took the Irish Confederate oath of association, and was made a member of the council and lieutenant-general of the forces of the Catholic confederacy. The confederacy, however, giving him no support in his projects, he threw up his commission, and with Ormond's help despatched about 1600 men under his kinsman Alasdair MacColla in June to Montrose's assistance in Scotland, sparking a Scottish civil war. Antrim subsequently returned to Oxford and was sent by the king in 1645 with letters for the queen at Saint-Germain-en-Laye.

He proceeded thence to Flanders and fitted out two frigates with military stores, which he brought to the Prince of Wales at Falmouth. He visited Cork and afterwards in July 1646 joined his troops in Scotland, with the hope of expelling Argyll from Kintyre; but he was obliged to retire by order of the king, and returning to Ireland threw himself into the intrigues between the various factions.

Late in 1647 he was appointed with Muskerry and Geoffrey Browne by the Irish confederacy to negotiate a treaty with the Prince of Wales in France, and though he outmanoeuvred his companions by starting a week before them, he failed to secure the coveted lord-lieutenancy, which was confirmed to Ormond.

== Cromwell era ==
He now ceased to support the Roman Catholics or the king's cause; opposed the treaty between Ormond and the confederates; supported the project of union between O'Neill and the parliament; and in 1649 entered into communications with Cromwell, for whom he performed various services during the Cromwellian conquest of Ireland, though there appears no authority to support Carte's story that Antrim was the author of a forged agreement for the betrayal of the king's army by Lord Inchiquin (Calendar State Papers Ireland, 1660–1662, pp. 294, 217; Cal. of Clarendon St. Pap., ii. 69, and Gardiner's Commonwealth, i. 153). Subsequently, he joined Ireton, and was present at the Siege of Carlow.

He returned to England in December 1650, and in lieu of his confiscated estate received a pension of £500 and later of £800, together with lands in County Mayo.

== Restoration ==
After the Restoration of Charles II to the throne in 1660, Antrim went to London to demonstrate his loyalty to the King. Before being able to meet Charles, he was imprisoned in the Tower of London, accused of collaboration with Cromwell and the English Republicans. Antrim was excluded from the Indemnity and Oblivion Act, which offered a pardon for offences that might have been committed during the previous two decades. His long-standing rival Argyll also came to London to swear his loyalty to Charles, and was likewise imprisoned before being taken back to Scotland, tried and executed for treason.

From July 1660 until May 1661 Antrim remained in the Tower. He was investigated by the new Royalist authorities for several offences, particularly allegations that he had taken part in the 1641 Irish Rebellion and that he had publicly suggested Charles I had secret involvement with the rising. He was also accused of a variety of other crimes including specific charges of his dealings with Ireton and other Republican officers during the Irish campaigns. Although all but the first of these accusations were essentially true, Antrim was eventually released without being charged.

== Later life ==
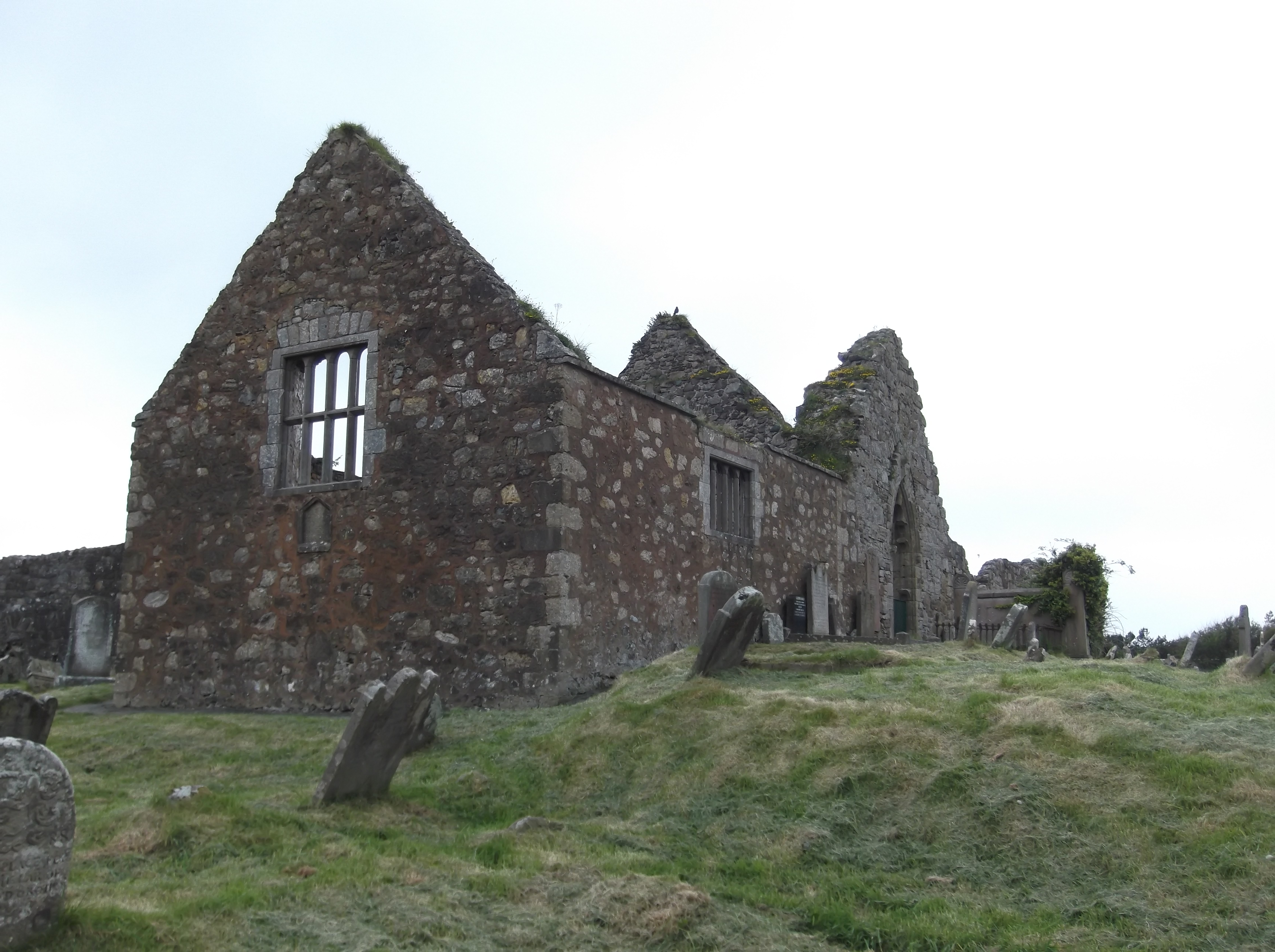
Antrim was buried at Bonamargy Friary which he had supported during his lifetime.

Despite being cleared, he still faced serious battles to recover his Irish estates. He had to prove that he was innocent of any involvement in the Irish rebellion.

Subsequently, being called before the lords justice in Ireland, In 1663 he succeeded, despite Ormond's opposition, in securing a decree of innocence from the commissioners of claims. This raised an outcry from the adventurers who had been put in possession of his lands, and who procured a fresh trial; but Antrim appealed to the king, and through the influence of the queen mother obtained a pardon, his estates being restored to him by the Irish Act of Explanation in 1665

Antrim was described by Clarendon as "of handsome appearance but of excessive pride and vanity and of a marvellous weak and narrow understanding". He married secondly Rose, daughter of Sir Henry O'Neill, but had no children, being succeeded in the earldom by his brother Alexander, 3rd Earl of Antrim.

== Death and timeline ==
Lord Antrim died on 3 February 1683. He had married twice but both marriages were childless. The marquessate became extinct and Randal was, therefore, the first and last Marquess of Antrim of the 1645 creation. His brother Alexander succeeded him in the earldom as the 3rd Earl of Antrim.

Timeline
Age	Date	Event
0	1609, 9 Jun	Born, probably at Dunluce Castle.
8	1618, 28 May	Father created Viscount Dunluce.
11	1620, 12 Dec	Becomes Viscount Dunluce, as his father is created Earl of Antrim.
15	1625, 27 Mar	Accession of King Charles I, succeeding King James I
22	1632, 12 Jan	Thomas Wentworth, later Earl of Strafford, appointed Lord Deputy of Ireland, succeeding
25	1635, April	Married Katherine Villiers, the widow of George Villiers, 1st Duke of Buckingham.
27	1636, 10 Dec	Succeeded his father as the 2nd Earl of Antrim'.
31	1640, 28 Oct	The Treaty of Ripon ended the 2nd Bishops' War.
31	1641, 12 May	Strafford beheaded
32	1641, 23 Oct	Outbreak of the Rebellion
32–33	1642	Surprised by Monroe at Dunluce and taken prisoner.
35	1645, 26 Jan	Created Marquess of Antrim.
36	1645, 21 Oct	Giovanni Battista Rinuccini, the papal nuncio, landed in Ireland.
36	1646, 5 Jun	Battle of Benburb
39	1649, 30 Jan	King Charles I beheaded.
50	1660, 29 May	Restoration of King Charles II
73	1683, 3 Feb	Died childless, and was succeeded by his brother as the 3rd Earl.

== Notes and references ==
=== Sources ===
- Asch, Ronald G. (2004). "Wentworth, Thomas, first earl of Strafford (1593–1641)". In Matthew, Colin; Harrison, Brian (eds.). Oxford Dictionary of National Biography. Vol. 56. New York: Oxford University Press. pp. 142–157. ISBN 0-19-861408-X.
- Burke, Bernard (1866). A Genealogical History of the Dormant, Abeyant, Forfeited and Extinct Peerages of the British Empire (New ed.). London: Harrison. OCLC 11501348.
- Burke, Bernard; Burke, Ashworth Peter (1915). A Genealogical and Heraldic History of the Peerage and Baronetage, the Privy Council, Knightage and Companionage (77th ed.). London: Harrison. OCLC 1155471554. (for Antrim)
- Canny, Nicholas (2004). "O'Neill, Hugh [Aodh O'Neill], second earl of Tyrone (1583–1616)". In Matthew, Colin; Harrison, Brian (eds.). Oxford Dictionary of National Biography. Vol. 41. New York: Oxford University Press. pp. 837–845. ISBN 0-19-861391-1.
- Carte, Thomas (1851) [1st pub. 1736]. The Life of James Duke of Ormond. Vol. III (New ed.). Oxford: Oxford University Press. OCLC 1086656347. – 1643 to 1660
- Coffey, Diarmid (1914). O'Neill and Ormond – A Chapter of Irish History. Dublin: Maunsel & Company. OCLC 906164979.
- Cokayne, George Edward (1910). Gibbs, Vicary (ed.). The complete peerage of England, Scotland, Ireland, Great Britain and the United Kingdom, extant, extinct, or dormant. Vol. I (2nd ed.). London: St Catherine Press. OCLC 228661424. – Ab-Adam to Basing
- Debrett, John (1828). Peerage of the United Kingdom of Great Britain and Ireland. Vol. II (17th ed.). London: F. C. and J. Rivington. OCLC 54499602. – Scotland and Ireland
- Duffy, Seán (2002). The Illustrated History of Ireland. New York: Contemporary Books. ISBN 0-8092-2437-2.
- Dunlop, Robert (1895). "O'Neill, Hugh, third Baron of Dungannon and second Earl of Tyrone 1540?–1616". In Lee, Sidney (ed.). Dictionary of National Biography. Vol. XLII. New York: MacMillan and Co. pp. 188–196. OCLC 8544105.
- Fryde, Edmund Boleslaw; Greenway, D. E.; Porter, S.; Roy, I., eds. (1986). Handbook of British Chronology. Royal Historical Society Guides and Handbooks, No. 2 (3rd ed.). London: Offices of the Royal Historical Society. ISBN 0-86193-106-8. – (for timeline)
- Gardiner, Samuel Rawson (1904). History of England from the Accession of James I to the Outbreak of the Civil War. Vol. IX. London: Longmans, Green & Co. OCLC 559091724. – 1639 to 1641
- Gilbert, John Thomas, ed. (1879). A Contemporary History of Affairs in Ireland from 1641 to 1652. Vol. I. Dublin: Irish Archeological and Celtic Society. OCLC 831383411. – Aphorismical Discovery, 1641 to 1648
- Hallam, Henry (1872). Constitutional Historical of England. Vol. 3 (New ed.). London: John Murray. OCLC 834522161.
- Hill, Rev. George (1873). An Historical Account of the MacDonnells of Antrim. Belfast: Archer & Sons. OCLC 1046037789.
- Lodge, John (1789). Archdall, Mervyn (ed.). The Peerage of Ireland or, A Genealogical History of the Present Nobility of that Kingdom. Vol. I. Dublin: James Moore. OCLC 264906028. – Blood royal, dukes, earls (for Antrim)
- Manning, Roger (2006). An Apprenticeship in Arms; the Origins of the British Army 1585-1702. OUP. ISBN 978-0199261499.
- Meehan, Rev. Charles Patrick (1870). The Fate and Fortunes of Hugh O'Neill, Earl of Tyrone. and Rory O'Donel, Earl of Tyrconnel; their Flight from Ireland and Death in Exile (2nd ed.). Dublin: James Duffy. OCLC 17958027.
- Ohlmeyer, Jane H. (2001) [1st pub. 1993]. Civil War and Restoration in the Three Stuart Kingdoms: The Career of Randal MacDonnell, Marquis of Antrim (2nd ed.). Dublin: Four Courts Press. ISBN 1-85182-626-2. – (Snippet view)
- Ohlmeyer, Jane H. (2004). "MacCarthy, Donough, first earl of Clancarty (1594–1665)". In Matthew, Colin; Harrison, Brian (eds.). Oxford Dictionary of National Biography. Vol. 35. New York: Oxford University Press. pp. 107–108. ISBN 0-19-861385-7.
- Ohlmeyer, Jane H. (2012). Making Ireland English: The Irish Aristocracy in the Seventeenth Century. New Haven, Connecticut: Yale University Press. ISBN 978-0-300-11834-6. – (Preview)
- Paul, Sir James Balfour (1904). The Scots Peerage, Founded on Wood's Edition of Sir Robert Douglas's Peerage of Scotland. Vol. I. Edinburgh: David Douglas. OCLC 505064285. – Abercorn to Balmerino
- Stevenson, David (1981). Scottish Covenanters and Irish Confederates. Belfast: Ulster Historical Foundation. ISBN 1-903688-46-9. – (Preview)
- Warner, Ferdinand (1768). History of the Rebellion and Civil-War in Ireland. Vol. I. Dublin: James William. OCLC 82770539. – 1641 to 1643
- Webb, Alfred (1878a). "MacDonnell, Randal, 2nd Earl and Marquess of Antrim". Compendium of Irish Biography. Dublin: M. H. Gill & Son. p. 310. OCLC 122693688.
- Webb, Alfred (1878b). "O'Neill, Hugh, Earl of Tyrone". Compendium of Irish Biography. Dublin: M. H. Gill & Son. pp. 410–416. OCLC 122693688.
- Yorke, Philip Chesney (1911). "Antrim, Randal MacDonnell, 1st Marquess of" . In Chisholm, Hugh (ed.). Encyclopædia Britannica. Vol. 02 (11th ed.). Cambridge University Press. p. 152.

Peerage of Ireland
New creation	Marquess of Antrim; 1645–1682	Extinct
Preceded by Randal MacDonnell	Earl of Antrim; 1636–1683	Succeeded by Alexander MacDonnell
