= Randal William MacDonnell, Marquess of Antrim =

Irish peer, died 1791

The Most Honourable The Marquess of Antrim KB PC (Ire)
- Born: Randal William MacDonnell; 4 November 1749
- Died: 29 July 1791 (aged 41); Antrim House, Merrion Square, Dublin
- Spouse: Hon. Letitia Morres Trevor (m. 1774; died 1791)
- Children: Anne MacDonnell, 2nd Countess of Antrim; Lady Letitia Mary MacDonnell; Charlotte MacDonnell, 3rd Countess of Antrim
- Parent(s): Alexander MacDonnell, 5th Earl of Antrim; Anne Plunkett
- Relatives: Frances Vane, Marchioness of Londonderry (granddaughter); Hugh McDonnell, 4th Earl of Antrim (grandson)

Randal William MacDonnell, Marquess of Antrim (4 November 1749 – 29 July 1791), was an Irish peer.

== Early life ==
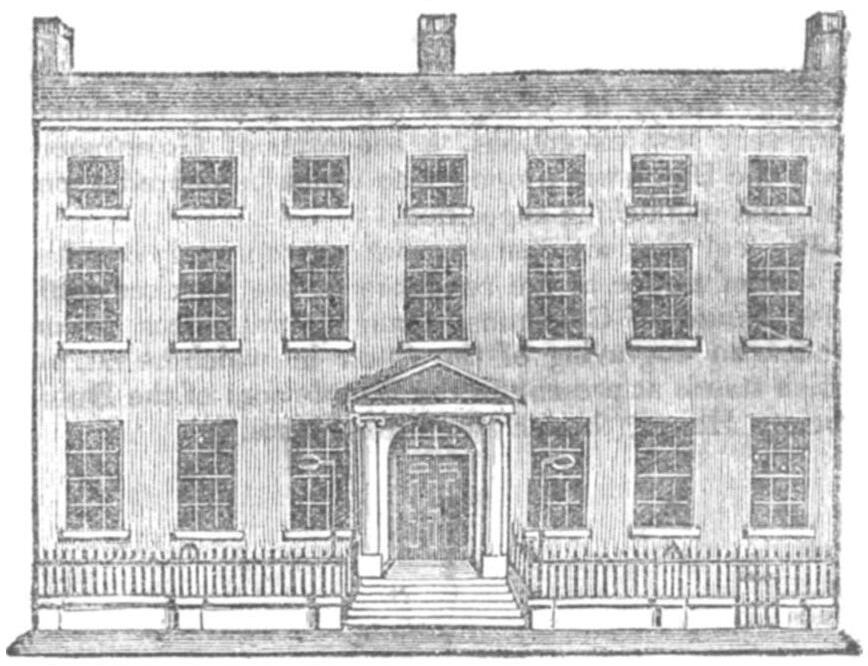
Antrim House, Merrion Square, Dublin, 1836

He was born on 4 November 1749, the only son and heir of Alexander MacDonnell, 5th Earl of Antrim, by his second wife Anne Plunkett, daughter of Charles Patrick Plunkett. From his father's first marriage to Elizabeth Pennefather (a daughter of Matthew Pennefather), he had a half-sister who died in infancy. From his parents' marriage, he had two sisters, Lady Rachel MacDonnell (who married Joseph Sanford) and Lady Elizabeth Helena MacDonnell (who married, as his third wife, Col. Sir James Campbell). After his mother's death in 1755, his father married Catharine Meredyth (a daughter of Thomas Meredyth), on 5 July 1755.

His paternal grandparents were Randal MacDonnell, 4th Earl of Antrim, and Hon. Rachael Skeffington (a daughter of the 3rd Viscount Massereene). His maternal grandparents were Charles Patrick Plunkett and Elizabeth Stratford (a daughter of Edward Stratford).

== Career ==
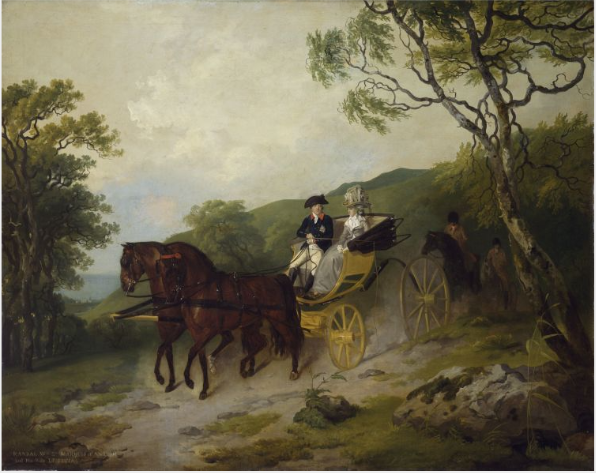
Portrait of The Marquess and Marchioness of Antrim, by Francis Wheatley, 1782

As Viscount Dunluce, the courtesy title afforded him as his father's heir apparent, he sat in the Irish House of Commons for County Antrim from 1768 to 1775, and served as High Sheriff of Antrim in 1771. At this time Sir John Blaquiere wrote of him as "an idle, unsteady young man, not to be depended upon". He succeeded his father as Earl of Antrim on 13 October 1775 and took his seat in the Irish House of Lords on 13 March 1776.

On 5 May 1779, he was made a Knight Companion of the Order of the Bath. On 5 February 1783, on the institution of the order, he was nominated a Knight of the Order of St Patrick, but was never installed as he was unwilling to resign the Order of the Bath. He "relinquished the stall intended for him" as a Knight of St Patrick on 8 March 1783.

Having no male issue, he was, on 19 June 1785, created Viscount Dunluce and Earl of Antrim in the Peerage of Ireland, with a special remainder of those dignities, failing heirs male of his body, to his daughters in order of seniority, and the heirs male of their bodies respectively. He was appointed to the Privy Council of Ireland in 1786, and on 18 August 1789 he was created Marquess of Antrim in the Peerage of Ireland, but without a special remainder.

== Personal life ==
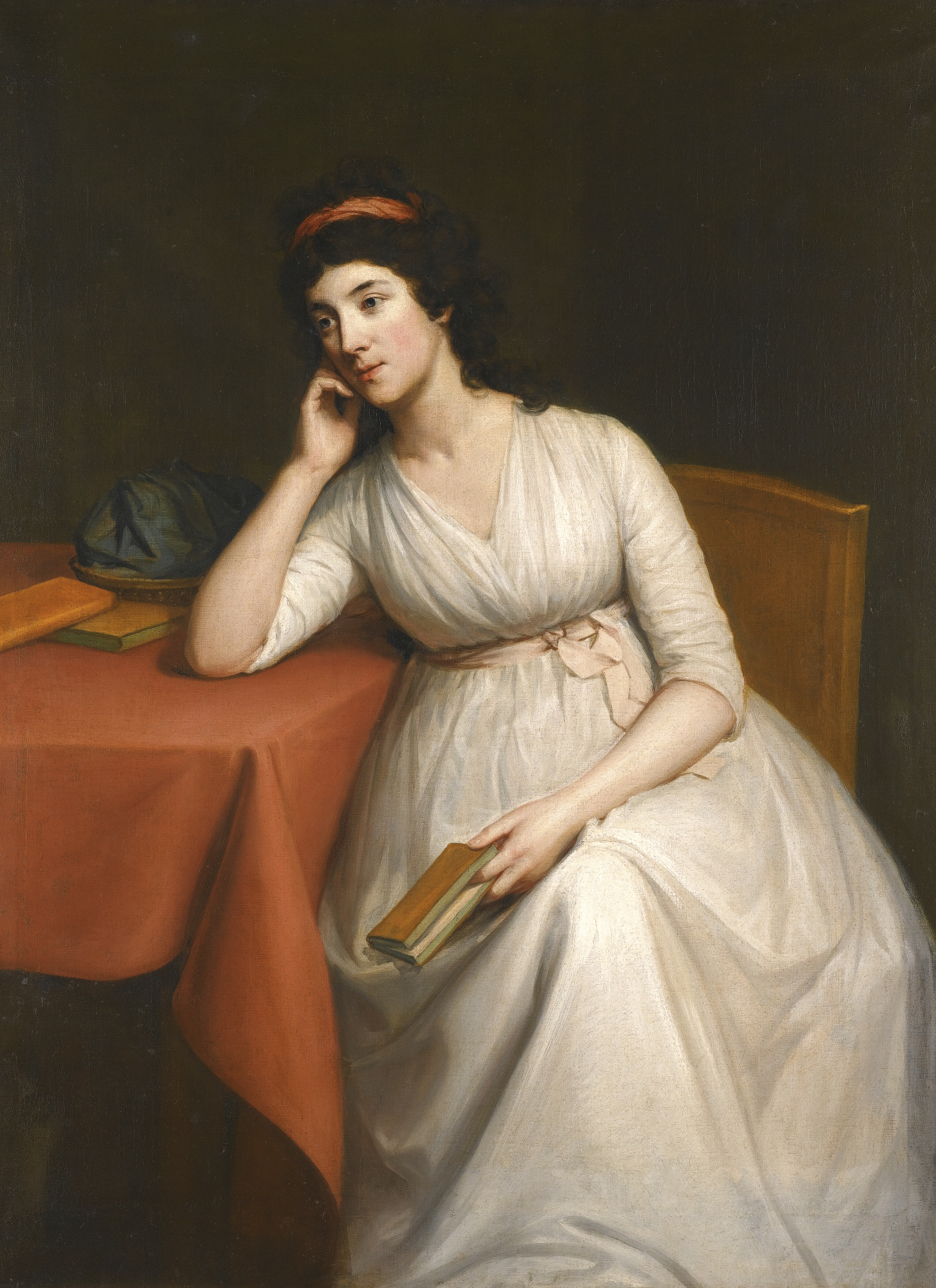
Portrait of a Lady (likely his daughter, Charlotte MacDonnell, 3rd Countess of Antrim), by Hugh Douglas Hamilton, 1790s

On 3 July 1774, Antrim married Hon. Letitia (née Morres) Trevor, widow of the Hon. Arthur Trevor (who died in 1770), the daughter of Harvey Morres, 1st Viscount Mountmorres, by his first wife, Letitia Ponsonby (a daughter of 1st Earl of Bessborough). Together, they were the parents of:

- Anne Katharine MacDonnell, 2nd Countess of Antrim (1778–1834), a twin, she inherited his peerages under the special remainder of 1785, becoming suo jure Countess of Antrim and Viscountess Dunluce; she married by special licence, on 25 April 1799 at her mother's house in Hanover Square, Sir Henry Vane-Tempest, 2nd Baronet, of Wynyard, County Durham. After his death in 1813, she married secondly on 27 June 1817, by special licence in Bruton Street, St James's, Edmund Phelps, who took the name of McDonnell by royal licence on 27 June 1817.
- Lady Letitia Mary MacDonnell (1778–1797), a twin who died unmarried and was buried at St James's Church, Westminster.
- Charlotte MacDonnell, 3rd Countess of Antrim (1779–1835), who also inherited the peerages under the special remainder of 1785, succeeding as suo jure Countess of Antrim and Viscountess Dunluce, in 1834; she married on 18 July 1799 Vice-Admiral Lord Mark Kerr, third son of William Kerr, 5th Marquess of Lothian, at her mother's house in Hanover Square.

Lord Antrim died on 29 July 1791 at Antrim House, Merrion Square, Dublin, and was buried at Bonamargy. On his death the Marquessate of Antrim and such peerage honours as he had inherited (viz. the Earldom of Antrim created in 1620 and the Viscountcy of Dunluce created in 1618) became extinct, but the creations of 1785 devolved as below. His will, dated 14 August 1790, was proved at Dublin on 15 August 1791.

His widow died of cancer in Grosvenor Square on 7 December 1801, and was buried at St James's Church, Westminster, on 14 December. Her will (with nine codicils) was proved on 21 January 1802.

=== Descendants ===
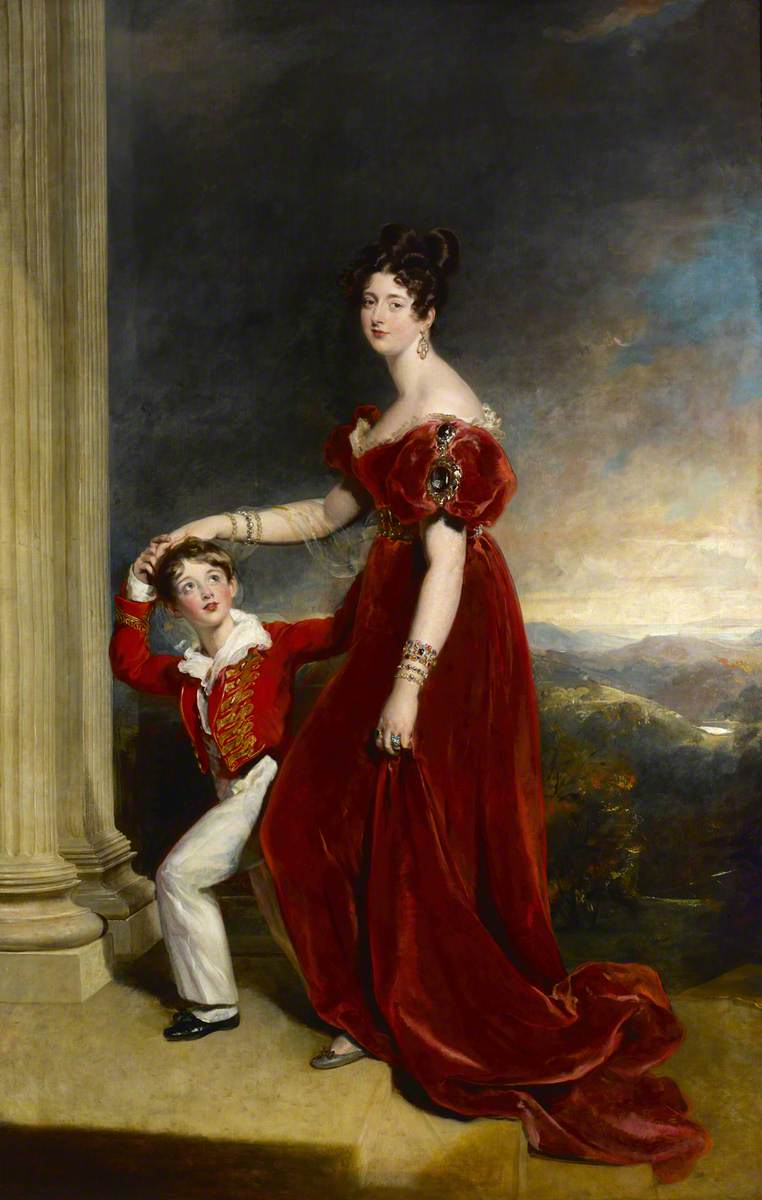
His granddaughter, Frances Vane, Marchioness of Londonderry, and her son, George, by Sir Thomas Lawrence, 1828

Through his eldest daughter Anne, he was posthumously a grandfather of Lady Frances Vane-Tempest (1800–1865), who inherited her father's large estates. She married Charles Vane, 3rd Marquess of Londonderry, and was the mother of George Vane-Tempest, 5th Marquess of Londonderry, Lady Frances Vane (wife of John Spencer-Churchill, 7th Duke of Marlborough), Lady Alexandrina Vane (godchild of Czar Alexander I of Russia; she married Henry Dawson-Damer, 3rd Earl of Portarlington), Lord Adolphus Vane-Tempest, and Lady Adelaide Emelina Caroline Vane (who eloped with her brother's tutor, Rev. Frederick Henry Law).

Through his youngest daughter Charlotte, he was a grandfather of Hugh Seymour Kerr (1812–1855), who succeeded to the earldom and assumed the surname of McDonnell by royal licence of 27 June 1836, as well as Mark McDonnell, 5th Earl of Antrim (1814–1869).

Peerage of Ireland
New creation	Marquess of Antrim; 1789–1791	Extinct
Preceded by Alexander MacDonnell	Earl of Antrim; 1775–1791	Extinct
New creation	Earl of Antrim; 1785–1791	Succeeded by Anne Katharine MacDonnell
