= Randal MacDonnell, 1st Marquess of Antrim =

Randal MacDonnell, 1st Marquess of Antrim may refer to:

- Randal MacDonnell, 1st Marquess of Antrim (1645 creation) (1609–1683), Roman Catholic landed magnate in Scotland and Ireland, son of the 1st Earl of Antrim
- Randal MacDonnell, 1st Marquess of Antrim (1789 creation) (1749–1791)
