= McQuillan =

McQuillan and MacQuillan are surnames of Irish origin. There are several unrelated origins of the surnames McQuillan and MacQuillan.

The Ulster variant of the surname was claimed to be an anglicisation of the Gaelic Mac Uighilín (son of Hugelin), the name allegedly adopted by the family of Hugelin de Mandeville. The de Mandevilles were a Cambro-Norman family and had conquered an area of north Antrim. In reality the de Mandevilles sold their estates in northern Antrim to the McQuillans of County Down. Both families had previously held the office of "constable of the bonnaght" for the Earldom of Ulster – a system adopted from the Irish where mercenaries were hired to act as a body of standing troops. The McQuillans renamed the lands they acquired "the Route", derived from their "rout", a common term then for a private army.

== List of persons with the surname ==
=== Music and literature ===
- Colin McQuillan, vocalist in Belfast punk rock band Runnin' Riot
- Martin McQuillan (born 1972), Scottish literary theorist
- Paul McQuillan, guitarist

=== Politics ===
- Adrian McQuillan (born 1965), Northern Irish politician
- Henry McQuillan (1906–1979), Canadian politician
- Jack McQuillan (1920–1998), Irish politician
- Malcolm MacQuillan (died 1307), Scottish magnate
- Peter J. McQuillan (1929–2019), American judge and jurist
- Tim McQuillan, American student who took part in a same-sex marriage in Iowa

=== Science and technology ===
- Dan McQuillan, science writer
- Jim McQuillan (computer programmer), founder and project leader of the Linux Terminal Server Project
- John M. McQuillan (born 1949), American computer scientist
- Michael McQuillan (mathematician), Scottish mathematician

=== Sports ===
- Bob McQuillan, pairs winner at the 1981 Canadian National Bowls Championships
- George McQuillan (1885–1940), American Major League baseball pitcher
- Herb McQuillan (1891–1972), American football and basketball coach and college athletics administrator
- Jack McQuillan (footballer) (1885–1941), English footballer
- Jackie McQuillan, a separate fictional footballer played by Ally McCoist in A Shot at Glory
- James McQuillan (born 1993), Australian rugby player
- Jim McQuillan (darts player) (born 1940), Irish darts player
- Joe McQuillan (born 1975), Irish Gaelic football referee
- John McQuillan (footballer) (born 1970), Scottish professional footballer
- Matt McQuillan (born 1981), Canadian professional golfer
- Michael McQuillan (Gaelic footballer), Irish Gaelic footballer
- Pat McQuillan (born 1961), Northern Irish footballer
- Rachel McQuillan (born 1971), Australian professional tennis player
- Ross McQuillan, Northern Irish shooter
- Tony McQuillan (born 1951), Australian Test cricket match umpire

== See also ==
- McQuilken
- McQuillen
