= Earl of Antrim =

Title in the peerage of Ireland

Earldom of Antrim 2nd creation
- Quarterly: 1st & 4th grand-quarters (for MacDonnell) 1st, Or, a Lion rampant Gules; 2nd, Or, a dexter Arm issuant from the sinister fess point out of a Cloud proper, in the hand a Cross-Crosslet fitchée erect Azure; 3rd, Argent, a Ship with sails furled Sable, 4th, per fess Azure and Vert, a Dolphin naiant in fess proper. 2nd & 3rd grand quarters (for Kerr) 1st & 4th, Azure, a Sun-in Splendour Or; 2nd, Gules, on a Chevron Azure, three Mullets Gules; 3rd, Sable, on a Chevron between three Unicorn's Heads Argent, three Mullets Sable.
- Creation date: 19 June 1785
- Creation: Second
- Created by: George III
- Peerage: Ireland
- First holder: Randal MacSorley MacDonnell, 6th and 1st Earl of Antrim
- Present holder: Randal McDonnell, 10th Earl of Antrim
- Heir apparent: Randal MacDonnell, Viscount Dunluce
- Remainder to: the 1st Earl's daughters and the heirs male of their respective bodies lawfully begotten
- Subsidiary titles: Viscount Dunluce
- Seat: Glenarm Castle
- Former seat: Dunluce Castle

Earl of Antrim
- Quarterly: 1st, Or, a Lion rampant Gules; 2nd, Or, a dexter Arm issuant from the sinister fess point out of a Cloud proper, in the hand a Cross-Crosslet fitchée erect Azure; 3rd, Argent, a Ship with sails furled Sable, 4th, per fess Azure and Vert, a Dolphin naiant in fess proper.
- Creation date: 12 December 1620 (Earl of Antrim); 26 January 1645 (Marquess of Antrim – 1st creation); 18 August 1789 (Marquess of Antrim – 2nd creation)
- Creation: First
- Created by: James VI and I (Earldom - 1st creation); Charles I (Marquessate – 1st creation); George III (Marquessate – 2nd creation)
- Peerage: Ireland
- First holder: Randal MacDonnell, 1st Viscount Dunluce (Earldom); Randal MacSorley MacDonnell, 2nd Earl of Antrim (Marquess- 1st creation); Randal William MacDonnell, 6th & 1st Earl of Antrim (Marquess- 2nd creation)
- Last holder: Randal MacSorley MacDonnell, Marquess of Antrim; Randal William MacDonnell, Marquess of Antrim (Marquessate and Earldom – 1st creation)
- Remainder to: The 1st Earl's/Marquess's heirs male of the body lawfully begotten
- Subsidiary titles: Viscount Dunluce
- Status: Extinct
- Extinction date: 3 February 1682 (marquessate – 1st creation); 29 July 1791 (earldom and marquessate – 2nd creation)
- Motto: TOUJOURS PREST (Always ready)

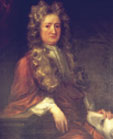
Randal MacSorley MacDonnell, Marquess of Antrim (1st creation).

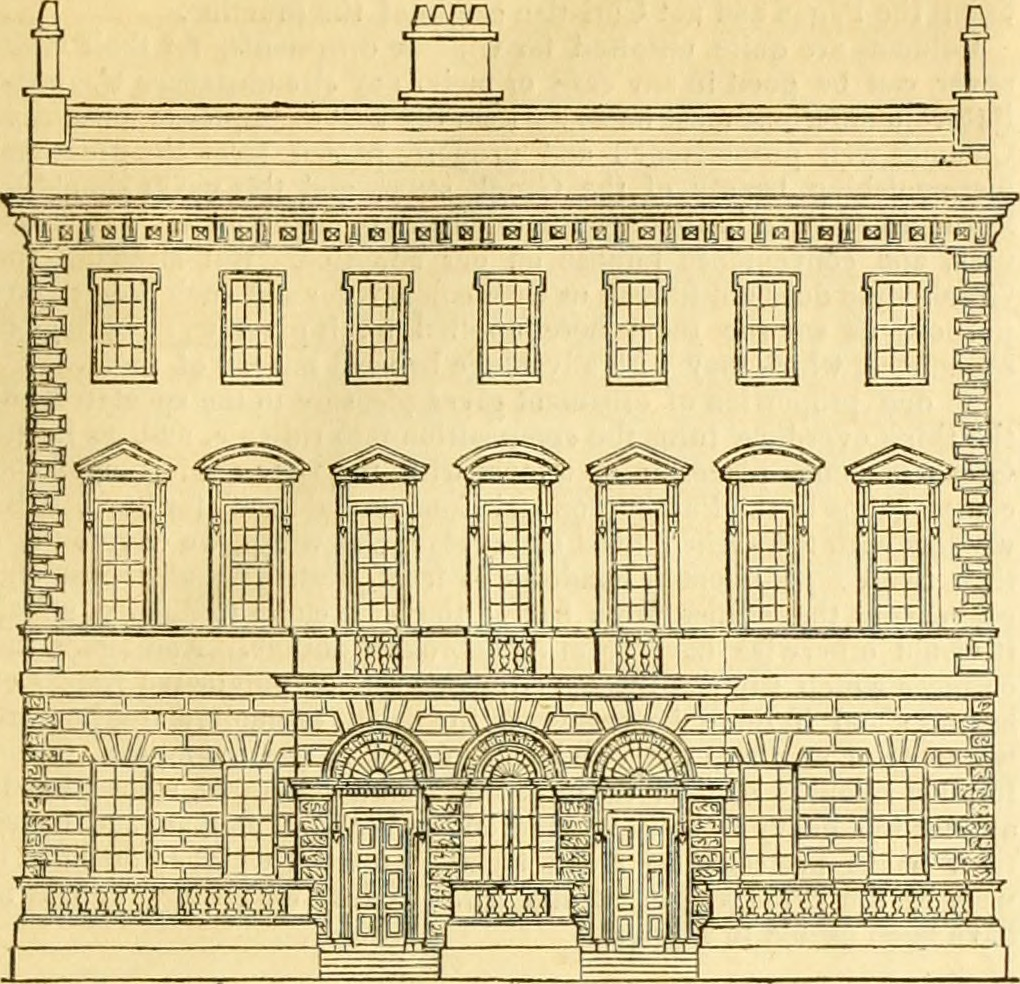
Antrim House, Merrion Square

Earl of Antrim is a title that has been created twice, both times in the Peerage of Ireland and both times for members of the MacDonnell family, originally of Scottish origins.

== History ==
The MacDonells of Antrim descended from Sorley Boy MacDonnell, who established the family in County Antrim. His fourth son Randal MacDonnell was created Viscount Dunluce, in the County of Antrim, in 1618, and Earl of Antrim in 1620. Both titles were in the Peerage of Ireland. His eldest son, the second Earl, fought as a Royalist in the Civil War and was created Marquess of Antrim in the Peerage of Ireland in 1645. He was childless and on his death in 1682 the marquessate became extinct.

He was succeeded in the viscountcy and earldom by his younger brother, the third Earl. He represented Wigan in the English House of Commons and also served as Lord Lieutenant of Antrim. Lord Antrim was attainted in 1689 for his support of King James II but was restored in 1697. His grandson, the fifth Earl, was Governor of County Antrim. He was succeeded by his son, the sixth Earl. He represented County Antrim in the Irish House of Commons. Lord Antrim had no sons, and as there were no other male heirs left of the first Earl, the titles were heading for extinction. However, in 1785 King George III created him Viscount Dunluce and Earl of Antrim in the Peerage of Ireland, with remainder to his daughters in order of seniority and the heirs male of their bodies. In 1789 he was further honoured when he was made Marquess of Antrim in the Peerage of Ireland, with normal remainder to the heirs male of his body.

On Lord Antrim's death in 1791 the viscountcy of Dunluce of 1618, the earldom of Antrim of 1620 and the marquessate became extinct. He was succeeded in the viscountcy and earldom of 1785 according to the special remainders by his eldest daughter Anne Catherine, the second holder of the titles. She married as her first husband Sir Henry Vane-Tempest, 2nd Baronet, of Long Newton. Their daughter Lady Frances Vane-Tempest married Charles Vane, 3rd Marquess of Londonderry, and was the great-grandmother of Prime Minister Winston Churchill. Lady Antrim had no sons and was succeeded by her younger sister Charlotte, the third holder. She was the wife of Vice Admiral Lord Mark Robert Kerr, third son of William John Kerr, 5th Marquess of Lothian.

She was succeeded by her eldest surviving son, the fourth Earl. He assumed in 1836 by Royal licence the surname of McDonnell in lieu of Kerr. He had no sons and was succeeded by his younger brother, the fifth Earl. On succeeding his brother in 1855, he too assumed by Royal licence the surname of McDonnell in lieu of Kerr. As of 2021 the titles are held by his great-great-great-grandson, the tenth Earl, who succeeded his father in that year. As a male-line descendant of the 5th Marquess of Lothian, he is also in remainder to that Scottish peerage and its subsidiary titles.

Angus McDonnell (1881–1966), second son of the sixth Earl of the second creation, was Member of Parliament for Dartford.

The family seat is Glenarm Castle, near Glenarm, County Antrim, in Northern Ireland.

The Dunluce Cup is awarded at the Larne Music Festival by the Viscount or Viscountess Dunluce, heir to the Earl of Antrim.

The McQuillan family held Dunluce before the McDonnells, but they were overthrown during the 1500s and were not granted any peerage.

== List of earls and marquesses ==
=== Earls of Antrim, first creation (1620) ===
Also Viscount Dunluce (1618)

- Randal MacDonnell, 1st Earl of Antrim (died 1636)
- Randal MacSorley MacDonnell, 2nd Earl of Antrim (1609–1682) (created Marquess of Antrim in 1645)

=== Marquesses of Antrim, first creation (1645) ===
Also Earl of Antrim (1620), Viscount Dunluce (1618)

- Randal MacSorley MacDonnell, Marquess of Antrim (1609–1682)

=== Earls of Antrim, first creation (1620; reverted) ===
Also Viscount Dunluce (1618)

- Alexander MacDonnell, 3rd Earl of Antrim (1615–1699) (forfeit 1689; restored 1697)
- Randal MacDonnell, 4th Earl of Antrim (1680–1721)
- Alexander MacDonnell, 5th Earl of Antrim (1713–1775)
- Randal William MacDonnell, 6th Earl of Antrim (1749–1791) (created Earl of Antrim in 1785 and Marquess of Antrim in 1789)

=== Marquesses of Antrim, second creation (1789) ===
- Randal William MacDonnell, Marquess of Antrim (1749–1791)

=== Earls of Antrim, second creation (1785) ===
Also: Viscount Dunluce (1785)

- Randal William MacDonnell, Marquess of Antrim, 1st Earl of Antrim (1749–1791)
- Anne Catherine MacDonnell, 2nd Countess of Antrim (1775–1834)
- Charlotte Kerr, 3rd Countess of Antrim (1779–1835)
- Hugh Seymour McDonnell, 4th Earl of Antrim (1812–1855)
- Mark McDonnell, 5th Earl of Antrim (1814–1869)
- William Randal McDonnell, 6th Earl of Antrim (1851–1918)
- Randal Mark Kerr McDonnell, 7th Earl of Antrim (1878–1932)
- Randal John Somerled McDonnell, 8th Earl of Antrim (1911–1977)
- Alexander Randal Mark McDonnell, 9th Earl of Antrim (1935–2021)
- Randal Alexander McDonnell, 10th Earl of Antrim (born 1967)

The heir apparent is the son of the present Earl, Alexander David Somerled McDonnell, Viscount Dunluce (born 2006).

== Family tree ==
Clan MacDonnell of Antrim family tree including: Marquess of Antrim and Earls of Antrim

Domhnall mac Raghnaill
Aonghus Mór d. c. 1293; Lord of Islay
Aonghus Óg Mac Domhnaill d. 1314 or 1318 or c. 1330; Lord of Islay
John of Islay c. 1320–1386; Lord of the Isles; Chief of Clan Donald
John Mór Tanister MacDonald d. 1427; 1st of Dunnyveg; Founder of Clan MacDonald of Dunnyveg | Margery Byset
Donald Balloch MacDonald d. c. 1476; 2nd of Dunnyveg
John Mor MacDonald fl. 1499; 3rd of Dunnyveg
John Cathanach MacDonald d. 1499; 4th of Dunnyveg
Alexander Carragh MacDonnell c. 1480–1538; 5th of Dunnyveg
Sorley Boy MacDonnell c. 1505–1590; Founder of Clan MacDonnell of Antrim | Hugh O'Neill c. 1550–1610; Earl of Tyrone
Viscount Dunluce, 1618; Earl of Antrim, 1620
Randal MacSorley MacDonnell; 1769–1636; 1st Earl of Antrim, etc. | Ellis (Alice) O'Neill; 1583–1665
Marquess of Antrim (1st creation), 1645
Randal MacSorley MacDonnell; 1609–1682; Marquess of Antrim, 2nd Earl of Antrim, etc. | Alexander MacDonnell; 1615–1699; 3rd Earl of Antrim, etc.
Marquessate of Antrim extinct, 1682
Randal MacDonnell; 1680–1721; 4th Earl of Antrim, etc.
Earl of Antrim (2nd creation) and Viscount Dunluce (2nd creation), 1785; Marquess of Antrim (2nd creation), 1789
Randal William MacDonnell; 1749–1791; Marquess of Antrim, 5th Earl of Antrim, etc., 1st Earl of Antrim, etc. | William Kerr; 1737–1815; Marquess of Lothian
Marquessate of Antrim (2nd creation), Earldom of Antrim (1st creation), and Viscountcy Dunluce (1st creation) extinct, 1721
Henry Vane-Tempest; 1771–1813; 2nd Baronet | Anne Catherine MacDonnell; 1775–1834; 2nd Countess of Antrim, etc. | Charlotte Kerr; 1779–1835; 3rd Countess of Antrim, etc. | Mark Kerr; 1776–1840
Frances Vane; 1800–1865; Marchioness of Londonderry | Hugh Seymour (Kerr) McDonnell; 1812–1855; 4th Earl of Antrim, etc. | Mark (Kerr) McDonnell; 1814–1869; 5th Earl of Antrim, etc.
William Randal McDonnell; 1851–1918; 6th Earl of Antrim, etc. | Louisa Grey; 1855–1945
Randal Mark Kerr McDonnell; 1878–1933; 7th Earl of Antrim, etc. | Angus McDonnell; 1881–1966
Angela Sykes; 1911–1984 | Randal John Somerled McDonnell; 1911–1977; 8th Earl of Antrim, etc.
Alexander Randal Mark McDonnell; 1935–2021; 9th Earl of Antrim, etc. | Hector McDonnell b. 1947
Flora McDonnell b. 1963 | Randal Alexander McDonnell b. 1967; 10th Earl of Antrim, etc.
Alexander David Somerled McDonnell b. 2006 styled Viscount Dunluce
Heir apparent to the Antrim earldom

== Arms ==
Coat of arms of the Earl of Antrim
| Crest 1st: A Dexter Arm embowed fesswise couped at the shoulder vested Or cuffed Argent holding in the hand a Cross Crosslet fitchée erect Azure (McDonnell); 2nd: A Sun in Splendour Or (Kerr). Escutcheon Quarterly: 1st and 4th, grandquarterly (for McDonnell): 1st, Or a Lion rampant Gules; 2nd, Or a Dexter Arm issuant from the sinister fess point out of a Cloud proper in the hand a Cross Crosslet fitchée erect Azure; 3rd, Argent a Ship with Sails furled Sable; 4th, per fess Azure and Vert a Dolphin naiant in fess proper; 2nd and 4th grandquarterly (for Kerr): 1st and 4th, Azure a Sun in splendour Or; 2nd, Gules on a Chevron Azure three Mullets of the field; 3rd, Sable on a Chevron between three Unicorns' Heads Argent as many Mullets of the field. Supporters Dexter: a Savage wreathed about the temples and loins with Ivy all proper; Sinister: a Falcon wings inverted proper beaked membered and belled Or. Motto Toujours Prest (Always ready). |

== See also ==
- Marquess of Lothian
- Glenarm Castle
- Dunaneeny Castle
