= Dunluce Castle =

Medieval castle on coast of Northern Ireland

- Dún Libhse; Dunluce Caissle
- County Antrim, Northern Ireland
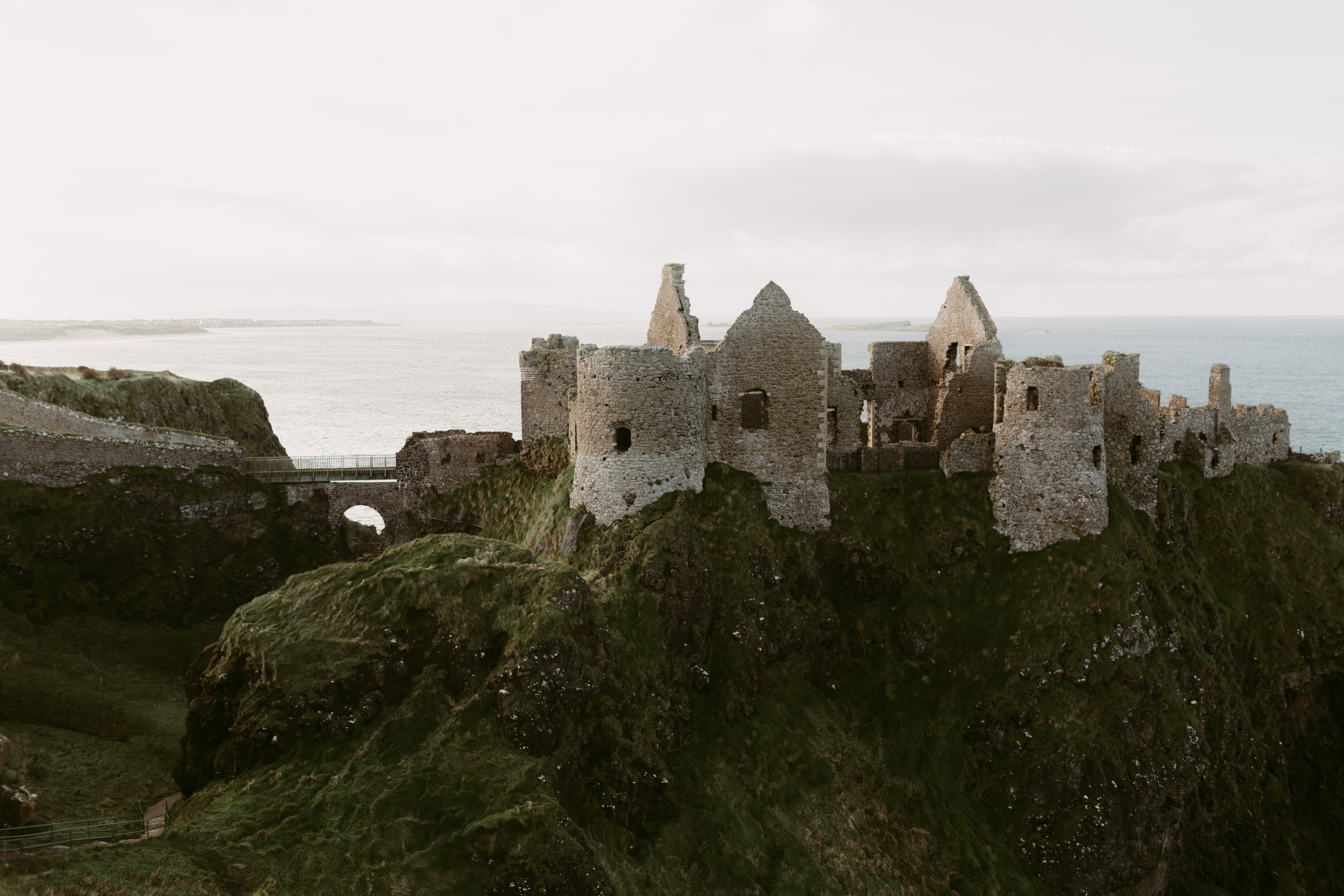
- Dunluce Castle, 2018

Site information
- Type: Castle
- Controlled by: Department for Communities (DfC)
- Open to the public: Yes
- Condition: In ruins

Location
- Location within Northern Ireland
- Coordinates: 55°12′41″N 6°34′45″W

Site history
- Built: 1200's by the Red Earl and 17th century
- Built by: Richard De burgh ( red Earl). Current castle built by Clan MacQuillan's

Dunluce Castle (/dʊnˈluːs/; from Irish Dún Libhse) is a now-ruined medieval castle in Northern Ireland, the seat of Clan MacQuillan. It is located on the edge of a basalt outcropping in County Antrim (between Portballintrae and Portrush), and is accessible via a bridge connecting it to the mainland. The castle is surrounded by extremely steep drops on either side, which may have been an important factor to the early Christians and Vikings who were drawn to this place where an early Irish fort once stood.

Dunluce Castle ruins on the basalt outcropping, 2026.

== History ==
In the 13th century, Richard Óg de Burgh, 2nd Earl of Ulster, built the first castle at Dunluce. It was first documented to be in the hands of the McQuillan family in 1513. The earliest features of the castle are two large drum towers about 9 metres (30 ft) in diameter on the eastern side, both relics of a stronghold built here by the McQuillans after they became lords of the Route. The McQuillans were the Lords of Route from the late 13th century until they were displaced by the MacDonnell after losing two major battles against them during the mid- and late-16th century.

Later Dunluce Castle became the home of the chief of the Clan MacDonnell of Antrim and the Clan MacDonald of Dunnyveg from Scotland. Chief John Mor MacDonald was the second son of Good John of Islay, Lord of the Isles, 6th chief of Clan Donald in Scotland. John Mor MacDonald l was born through John of Islay's second marriage to Princess Margaret Stewart, daughter of King Robert II of Scotland. In 1584, on the death of James MacDonald the 6th chief of the Clan MacDonald of Antrim and Dunnyveg, the Antrim Glens were seized by Sorley Boy MacDonnell, one of his younger brothers. Sorley Boy took the castle, keeping it for himself and improving it in the Scottish style. Sorley Boy swore allegiance to Queen Elizabeth I and his son Randal was made 1st Earl of Antrim by King James I.

Four years later, the Girona, a galleass from the Spanish Armada, was wrecked in a storm on the rocks nearby. The cannons from the ship were installed in the gatehouses and the rest of the cargo sold, the funds being used to restore the castle. MacDonnell's granddaughter Rose was born in the castle in 1613.

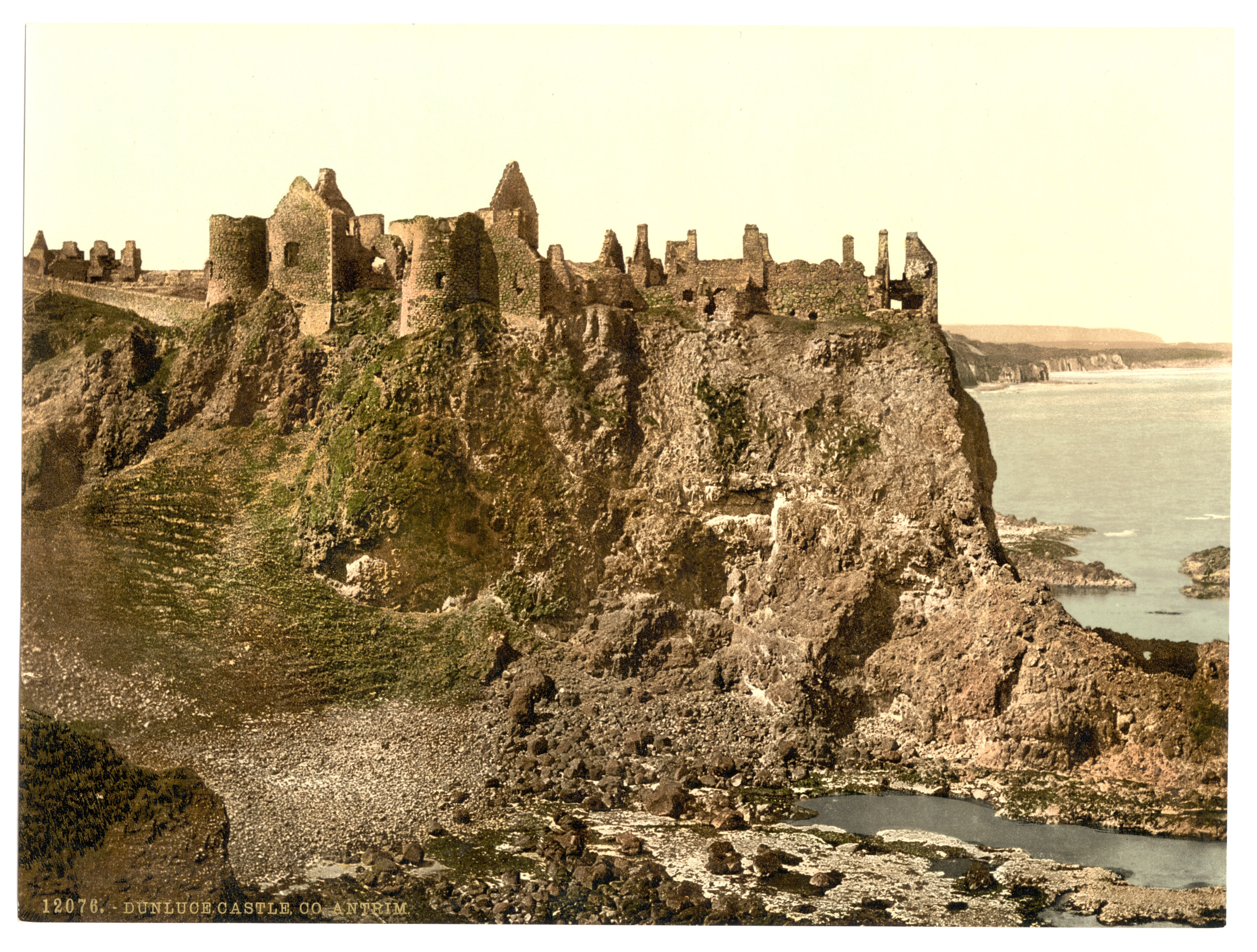
The castle in the last decade of the 19th century

Dunluce Castle served as the seat of the Earl of Antrim. Randal McDonnell, Earl of Antrim, and his wife Katherine Villiers, Duchess of Buckingham bought lavish furnishings. The castle was abandoned because of the impoverishment of the MacDonnells in 1690, following the Battle of the Boyne. Since that time, the castle has deteriorated and parts were scavenged to serve as materials for nearby buildings.

=== Dunluce town ===
In 2011, major archaeological excavations found significant remains of the "lost town of Dunluce", which was razed to the ground in the Irish uprising of 1641.

Lying adjacent to Dunluce Castle, the town was built around 1608 by Randall MacDonnell, the first Earl of Antrim, and pre-dates the official Plantation of Ulster. It may have contained the most revolutionary housing in Europe when it was built in the early 17th century, including indoor toilets, which had only started to be introduced around Europe at the time, and a complex street network based on a grid system. As of 2011, 95% of the town is still to be discovered.

== Preservation ==
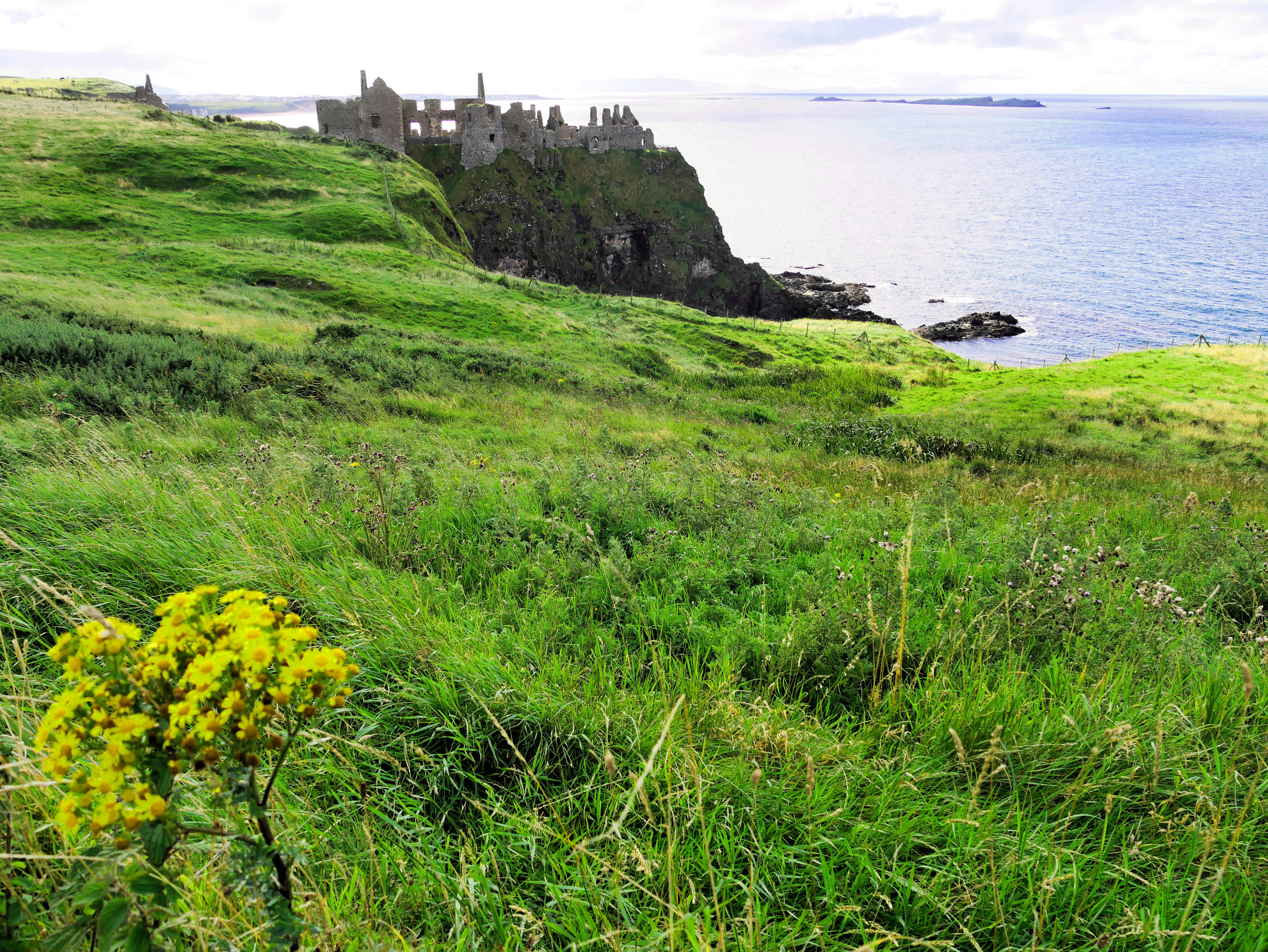
Dunluce Castle

Dunluce Castle is in the care of the Northern Ireland Environment Agency. It is a monument in state care sited in the townland of Dunluce, in Coleraine Borough Council area, at grid ref: C9048 4137. The earthworks, adjacent to Dunluce Castle, are a scheduled historic monument, at grid ref: area of C905 412.

== Cultural references ==
- The castle inspired the orchestral tone poem Dunluce (1921) by Irish composer Edward Norman Hay.
- Dunluce Castle is thought to be the inspiration for Cair Paravel in C. S. Lewis's Chronicles of Narnia (1950–54).
- Ron Moody menaced Jack Wild and Helen Raye at Dunluce Castle in Flight of the Doves, a 1971 film.
- In 1973 the castle appeared on the inner gatefold of the Led Zeppelin album Houses of the Holy.
- Exterior shots of Dunluce Castle were used in Game of Thrones for Pyke of House Greyjoy on Pyke Island.

== See also ==
- List of castles in Northern Ireland
