= Randal MacDonnell, 1st Earl of Antrim =

Irish lord (died 1636)

Randal MacDonnell
- Earl of Antrim
- Tenure: 1620–1636
- Successor: Randal, Marquess of Antrim
- Died: 10 December 1636
- Buried: Bonamargy Friary
- Spouse: Alice O'Neill
- Issue Detail: Randal, Alexander, & others
- Father: Sorley Boy MacDonnell
- Mother: Mary O'Neill

Randall MacSorley MacDonnell, 1st Earl of Antrim, PC (Ire) (died 10 December 1636), rebelled together with Tyrone and Tyrconnell in the Nine Years' War but having succeeded his brother, Sir James mac Sorley MacDonnell, as Lord of the Route and the Glynns in 1601, he submitted to Mountjoy, the Lord Deputy of Ireland, in 1602.

In 1618, he became Viscount Dunluce and in 1620 was advanced to Earl of Antrim. However, he remained Catholic.

== Birth and origins ==
Family tree

Randal MacDonnell with wife, parents, and other selected relatives. (Note: Also see the lists of siblings and children in the text.)

Alexander; MacDonnell c. 1480 – 1538	Catherine; MacDonald	Mathew; 1st Baron; Dungannon; 1520–1558	Joan; Maguire; 1558
Sorley Boy; MacDonnell d. 1590	Mary; O'Neill	Hugh; 3rd Earl; Tyrone c. 1550 – 1616	Siobhan; O'Donnell d. 1591
Randal; 1st Earl; 1769–1636	Alice; O'Neill; 1583–1665
Randal; 1st Marquess; 1609–1682	Elizabeth; Annesley d. 1672	Alexander; 3rd Earl; 1615–1699	Helena; Burke d. 1710
Randal; 4th Earl; 1680–1721	Rachel; Skeffington d. 1739

Legend

XXX	Subject of the article	XXX	Earls & marquesses of Antrim	XXX	Earl of Tyrone

XXX	Baron; Dungannon

Randal was the fourth son of Sorley Boy MacDonnell and his first wife Mary O'Neill. His father was Lord of the Route. His father's family was a branch of the Scottish Clan Donald. His mother was a daughter of Conn O'Neill, 1st Earl of Tyrone. She died in 1582.

== Early life ==
In his youth, Randal was fostered in the Gaelic manner and lived with a Presbyterian Stewart family on the Scottish island of Arran. He was therefore called "Arranach" in Irish/Scottish Gaelic (meaning "of Arran"). His father died in February 1590 at Dunaneeny Castle near Ballycastle and Randal's elder brother James succeeded as Lord of the Route.

== Tyrone's Rebellion ==
In 1597, MacDonnell gave offence to the English Crown by helping his brother James to fortify Dunluce Castle. In that same year, he also helped his brother defeat Sir John Chichester in the Battle of Carrickfergus. Chichester, brother of Arthur Chichester, fell in the battle. MacDonnell joined Hugh O'Neill, Earl of Tyrone, in his rebellion, also called the Nine Years' War (1594–1603). Early in 1600, he accompanied Tyrone on his expedition into Munster.

== Lord of the Route ==
His brother James died suddenly on 13 April 1601 at Dunluce Castle, leaving the eldest son Alistair Carragh (or Alexander), but MacDonnell was designated as successor by tanistry. Foreseeing the failure of the rebellion, MacDonnell started negotiating his submission with the Lord Deputy, Mountjoy, who knighted him on 13 May 1602. In August 1602 he submitted to the lord deputy at Tullyhogue, offering to serve against Tyrone in Fermanagh with five hundred foot and forty horse at his own expense. His example had a good effect in the north.

James I acceded on 24 Mar 1603 and MacDonnell soon received signs of royal favour. On 28 May 1603, he was granted the Route and the Glynns, extending from Larne to Coleraine, nearly 340,000 acres. To this in the following year was added the island of Rathlin.

== Marriage ==
Before his marriage, MacDonnell fathered three sons, all of whom were probably illegitimate. One, known as Morrisne or Maurice MacDonnell, would be hanged at Coleraine in 1643 for his share in the rebellion of 1641; another, Francis MacDonnell, became a Franciscan friar, and the third was James.

In 1604 MacDonnell married Aellis, Elice, or Alice, who would die in 1665, third daughter of Hugh O'Neill by his second wife Siobhán O'Donnell.

Randal and Ellis had two sons:

1. Randal (1609–1683), succeeded as the 2nd earl and inherited the baronies of Dunluce and Kilconway with the castle of Dunluce
2. Alexander (1615–1699), who inherited the barony of Glenarm

—and six daughters, to each of whom he bequeathed £2,800, viz:

1. Anne, married first Christopher Nugent, Baron Delvin, and secondly William Fleming, 19th Baron Slane
2. Mary, married first to Lucas, second Viscount Dillon, and secondly to Oliver Plunket, sixth Baron Louth
3. Sarah, married first Niall Oge O'Neill of Killelagh, in County Antrim, secondly to Sir Charles O'Conor Sligo, and thirdly to Donal MacCarthy Mor
4. Catherine, married to Edward Plunket of Castlecor, County Meath, younger son of Patrick Plunket, 9th Baron Dunsany
5. Rose, married to Colonel George Gordon, brother of John Gordon, 14th Earl of Sutherland, who came to Ulster in 1642 as an officer in Major-general Monro's army, and to whose assistance the Marquess of Antrim owed his escape from prison at Carrickfergus in 1643
6. Margaret, (died 13 March 1623) never married

In 1606, Dunluce Castle, the priory of Coleraine, three parts of the fishing of the river Bann, the castle of Olderfleet (Larne), and all lands belonging to the Diocese of Down and Connor were for different reasons excepted out of his grant; but on 21 June 1615 Dunluce Castle was restored to him. His fourth part of the fishing of the River Bann, which he regarded as "the best stay of his living," involved him in a long and profitless controversy with James Hamilton, 1st Viscount Claneboye.

== Irish troubles ==
In 1607, probably on account of his old connection with Tyrone, and because he had about 1604 married Tyrone's daughter Ellis, he was charged by Christopher St Lawrence, 10th Baron Howth with being concerned in the Flight of the Earls, the departure of the earls of Tyrone and Tyrconnell to the continent. He appeared voluntarily before the Lord Deputy of Ireland, Sir Arthur Chichester, denied the truth of the charge, and experienced no further trouble on that account.

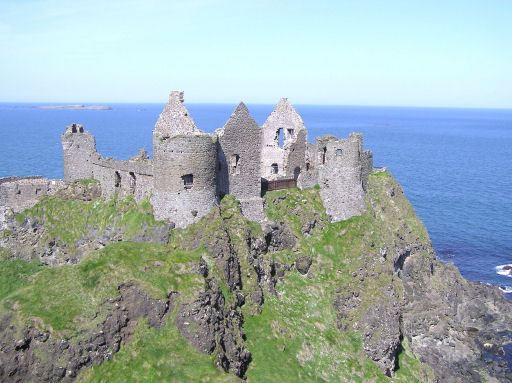
Dunluce Castle, his principal residence.

The Flight of the Earls in 1607 left him as the most senior Gaelic noble remaining in Ulster. In 1608 when Sir Cahir O'Doherty launched O'Doherty's Rebellion by burning Derry, MacDonnell did not join forces with him. O'Doherty, a former loyalist, had been angered at his treatment by local officials. O'Doherty was defeated and killed at the Battle of Kilmacrennan. In the wake of the rebellion, the government decided to increase the scope of the Plantation of Ulster. This did not affect MacDonnell as the counties Antrim and Down were excluded, as large-scale Scottish settling was already taking place there.

In 1614 another rebellion was attempted. It should have replaced Randal MacDonnell with his nephew Alexander MacDonnell, who had been overpassed in the succession in 1601. Alexander MacDonnell was pardoned. He would be made a baronet in 1627.

== Viscount and Earl ==
MacDonnell's prudent conduct strengthened his influence at court, and having by his judicious conduct in the matter of the Londoners' plantation at Coleraine, and the zeal with which he strove to civilise his own lands, effaced all memory of his early conduct, he was, on 29 June 1618, created Viscount Dunluce. Shortly afterwards he was admitted a member of the Privy Council of Ireland, appointed Lord Lieutenant of Antrim, and placed in command of a regiment. On 12 December 1620 he was advanced to Earl of Antrim.

== Later life, death, and timeline ==
Like his father and the MacDonnells generally, Antrim, as he was now, was a Roman Catholic. In 1621, he was charged, on the information of a certain Alexander Boyd, with harbouring priests in his house. He at once confessed his fault, promised never to fall into the like error again, and was graciously pardoned, but compelled to pay the reward due to Boyd for his information against him.

On seeking confirmation of his estates under the commission of grace in 1629, Antrim was opposed by Cahil O'Hara of Kildrome, who claimed certain lands included in the original grant, and either by course of law or from dictates of prudence O'Hara's claims were allowed.

Antrim sat in the House of Lords in the Irish Parliament of 1634–1635 when it was opened on 14 July 1634 by the new Lord Deputy of Ireland, Thomas Wentworth (the future Lord Strafford), who had taken office in July 1633. On 28 July, however, Antrim was excused from further attendance for reasons of health.

In January 1635, Antrim concluded a bargain with James Campbell, Lord Cantire, afterwards Earl of Irvine, for the purchase of the lordship of Cantire, originally in the possession of the MacDonnells, but they had been expelled in 1607. The arrangement was opposed by the Lord of Lorne, and Antrim's death intervening, the matter sank for a time into abeyance.

Antrim died at Dunluce on 10 December 1636, and was buried in the vault he had built at Bonamargy Friary in 1621. Shortly before his death, he completed the castle at Glenarm.

Timeline
As his birth date is uncertain, so are all his ages.
Age	Date	Event
0	1580, estimate	Born.
17–18	1598, 14 Aug	Battle of the Yellow Ford won by Hugh Roe O'Donnell over Henry Bagenal.
0	1582	Mother died.
9–10	1590, Jan	Father died, his elder brother James succeeded as lord of the Route.
18–19	1599, 12 Mar	Robert, Earl of Essex, appointed Lord Lieutenant of Ireland
20–21	1601, 23 Sep	The Spanish landed at Kinsale
22–23	1603, 24 Mar	Accession of King James I, succeeding Queen Elizabeth I
22–23	1603, 30 Mar	The Treaty of Mellifont ended Tyrone's Rebellion.
23–24	1604	Married Alice O'Neill
23–24	1604, 15 Oct	Sir Arthur Chichester, appointed Lord Deputy of Ireland
34–35	1615	Son Alexander born
34–35	1615, 2 Jul	Oliver St John, appointed Lord Deputy of Ireland
37–38	1618, 28 May	Created Viscount Dunluce.
39–40	1620, 12 Dec	Created Earl of Antrim.
44–45	1625, 27 Mar	Accession of King Charles I, succeeding King James I
52–53	1633, 3 Jul	Thomas Wentworth, later Earl of Strafford, appointed Lord Deputy of Ireland
55–56	1636, 10 Dec	Died at Dunluce Castle.

== Notes and references ==
=== Sources ===
- Augusteijn, Joost (2004). "Mellifont, treaty of". In Connolly, Sean Joseph (ed.). The Oxford Companion to Irish History (2nd ed.). Oxford: Oxford University Press. pp. 373–374. ISBN 0-19-280501-0.
- Burke, Bernard; Burke, Ashworth Peter (1915). A Genealogical and Heraldic History of the Peerage and Baronetage, the Privy Council, Knightage and Companionage (77th ed.). London: Harrison. OCLC 1155471554.
- Clavin, Terry (October 2009a). McGuire, James; Quinn, James (eds.). "MacDonnell, James Mac Sorley". Dictionary of Irish Biography.
- Clavin, Terry (October 2009b). McGuire, James; Quinn, James (eds.). "MacDonnell, Randall mac Sorley". Dictionary of Irish Biography.
- Cokayne, George Edward (1902). Complete Baronetage, 1611 to 1800. Vol. II (1st ed.). Exeter: William Pollard & Co. OCLC 866278985. – 1625 to 1649
- Cokayne, George Edward (1910). Gibbs, Vicary (ed.). The complete peerage of England, Scotland, Ireland, Great Britain and the United Kingdom, extant, extinct, or dormant. Vol. I (2nd ed.). London: St Catherine Press. OCLC 228661424. – Ab-Adam to Basing
- Dunlop, Robert (1893). "MacDonnell, Sir Randal, Viscount Dunluce and 1st Earl of Antrim". In Lee, Sidney (ed.). Dictionary of National Biography. Vol. XXXV. London: Smith, Elder, & Co. pp. 54–55. OCLC 8544105.
- Fryde, Edmund Boleslaw; Greenway, D. E.; Porter, S.; Roy, I., eds. (1986). Handbook of British Chronology. Royal Historical Society Guides and Handbooks, No. 2 (3rd ed.). London: Offices of the Royal Historical Society. ISBN 0-86193-106-8. – (for timeline)
- Hayes-McCoy, Gerard Anthony (1976). "Chapter IV: The Completion of the Tudor Conquest and the Advance of the Counterreformation". In Moody, Theodore William; Martin, F. X.; Byrne, Francis John (eds.). A New History of Ireland. Vol. III. Oxford: Oxford University Press. pp. 94–141. ISBN 978-0-19-820242-4. – 1534–1691
- Hill, Rev. George (1873). An Historical Account of the MacDonnells of Antrim. Belfast: Archer & Sons. OCLC 1046037789.
- House of Lords (1779). Journals of the House of Lords (PDF). Vol. I. Dublin: William Sleater. OCLC 35009219. – 1634 to 1699
- Joyce, Patrick Weston (1903). A Concise History of Ireland from the Earliest Times to 1837 (12th ed.). Dublin: M. H. Gill & Son. OCLC 815623752.
- Kearney, Hugh Francis (1959). Strafford in Ireland 1633–1641 – a Study in Absolutism. Manchester: Manchester University Press. OCLC 857142293.
- Lodge, John (1789). Archdall, Mervyn (ed.). The Peerage of Ireland or, A Genealogical History of the Present Nobility of that Kingdom. Vol. I. Dublin: James Moore. OCLC 264906028. – Blood royal, dukes, earls (for Antrim)
- McDonnell, Hector (2004). "MacDonnell, Randal, 1st Earl of Antrim (d. 1636)". In Matthew, Colin; Harrison, Brian (eds.). Oxford Dictionary of National Biography. Vol. 35. New York: Oxford University Press. pp. 305–307. ISBN 0-19-861385-7.
- O'Laverty, Rev. James (1887). An Historical Account of the History of the Diocese of Down and Connor. Vol. IV. Dublin: James Duffy and sons. OCLC 1046049405. – Dal-Riada
- Shaw, William A. (1906). The Knights of England. Vol. II. London: Sherratt & Hughes. – Knights bachelors & Index
- Wedgwood, Cicely Veronica (1961). Thomas Wentworth, First Earl of Strafford 1593–1641. A Revaluation. London: Jonathan Cape. OCLC 1068569885.

Attribution: This article incorporates text from a publication now in the public domain: Dunlop, Robert (1893). "MacDonnell, Randal (d.1636)". Dictionary of National Biography. Vol. 35. p. 54.

Peerage of Ireland
New creation	Earl of Antrim; 1620–1636	Succeeded by Randal MacDonnell
New creation	Viscount Dunluce; 1618–1636	Succeeded by Randal MacDonnell
