= McQuilken =

McQuilken is a surname. Notable people with the surname include:

- Jamie McQuilken (born 1974), Scottish footballer
- Kim McQuilken (born 1951), American football player
- Michael McQuilken, American theatre director and musician
- Paul McQuilken (born 1981), Scottish footballer
