= Route, County Antrim =

Medieval territory in Gaelic Ireland

Coordinates: 54.958°N 6.506°W

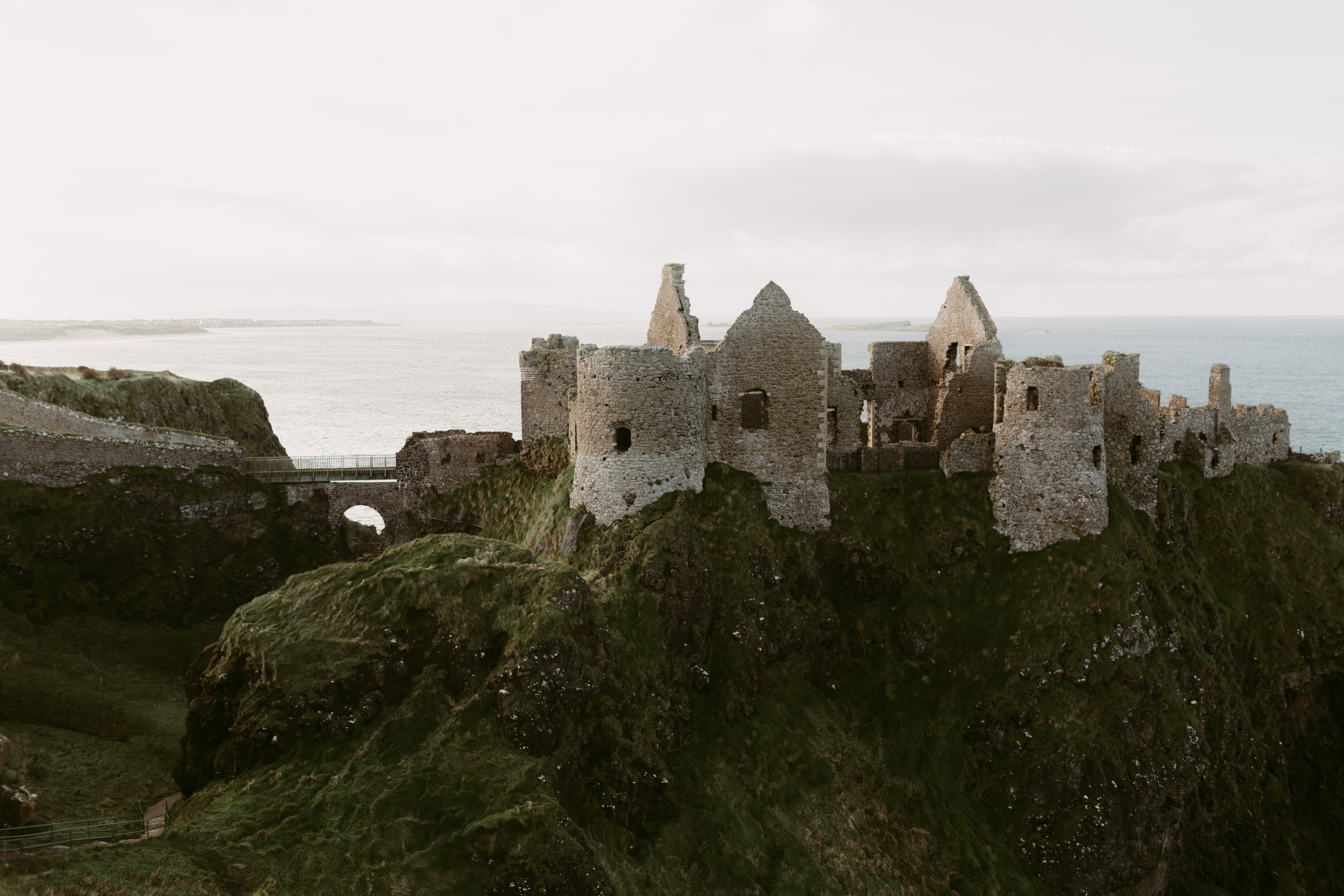
Dunluce Castle, the seat of the Lords of the Route

The Route (Irish: An Rúta) was a medieval territory in Gaelic Ireland, located on the north-east coast of Ulster. It stretched between Coleraine and Ballycastle and as far south as the Clogh River. Originally part of Twescard, a county of the Earldom of Ulster, it was later ruled by the McQuillans and then the MacDonnells.

== History ==
A map of Ulster from c. 1600, showing the Route and "McWilly [sic] his countrey"

The territory of the Route had been part of Twescard, a county of the Earldom of Ulster that at its height stretched from the Glens of Antrim to Inishowen. After the murder of the Earl of Ulster in 1333, the Irish chiefdoms rebelled and the Earldom of Ulster eventually collapsed. Almost all of it gradually fell under Gaelic control. By the 1460s, the de Mandevilles, who held manors in Twescard, decided to abandon them, and sold their land to the McQuillans, who according to the Annals of Ulster were already in the region warring with the O'Cahans as far back as 1442.

The McQuillans had come over to Ulster from southwest Scotland to aid the earls of Ulster as mercenaries, then fled from their territories in County Down to Antrim. Both families had held the office of "constable of the bonnaght" for the Earldom of Ulster, a system adopted from the Irish in which mercenaries were hired to act as a body of standing troops.

Sir John Perrot, Lord Deputy of Ireland, reduced parts of Ulster into allegiance to the English during the reign of Queen Elizabeth I. He laid siege to Dunluce Castle, forcing its surrender on honourable terms. The MacDonnells subsequently took it back by "treachery", but in 1585 it was once more surrendered to the English by Sorley Boy MacDonnell, to whom it was returned in charge.

Having made his submission, Sorley Boy obtained a grant to himself and his heirs of the greater part of the Route territory, between the rivers Bann and Bush (an area then called 'the Boys'), with certain other lands to the east, and was made constable of Dunluce Castle. A month beforehand, Sorley Boy's nephew had received a grant in similar terms of the greater part of 'the Glynns' (the Glens of Antrim). At the same time, in the Treaty of Berwick (1586), a clause was inserted recognising the right of the clan MacDonnell to remain in Ireland.

In 1584, as part of the shiring of Ulster, Sir John Perrott merged the territory of the Route with that of the Glens of Antrim and the greater portion of the territory of Clandeboye to create County Antrim. He also divided it into baronies, with the Route being divided into the baronies of Dunluce Lower and Upper, the North East Liberties of Coleraine, and Toome Lower and Upper. In 1613, as part of the creation of County Londonderry during the Plantation of Ulster, the northwestern portion of the Route, which formed the North East Liberties of Coleraine, was transferred from County Antrim so that the London companies could control both banks of the River Bann.

=== McQuillan–O'Cahan feud ===
During the mid-15th to mid-16th centuries, a strong feud raged between the McQuillans of the Route and their O'Cahan neighbours to their west that would have dire consequences. According to the Annals of Ulster, it started in 1442 when the McQuillans, along with the O'Neills, invaded the O'Cahan territory. This resulted in several wars of shifting allegiances and various contestants. The O'Neills, Sweeneys, and O'Donnells would ally with the O'Cahans and the MacDonnells of the Glens would aid the McQuillans.

In 1542 the McQuillans would appeal to the English for help, and seeing the opportunity to submit the O'Cahans to the surrender and regrant policy of King Henry VIII, the warden of Coleraine, John Travers, was ordered to attack the O'Cahans. The English would capture Limavady Castle and kill all the O'Cahan troops in the area, with Manus O'Cahan submitting partly to the Crown and signing an indenture of peace. The peace only lasted about two years before the O'Cahans and O'Donnells invaded the territory of the McQuillans, again capturing the castle at Ballylough, which was then besieged by the McQuillans and MacDonnells. By 1553, the territory of the O'Cahans was described as "for the most part waste".

In 1559, already weakened by the ravages of war with the O'Cahans and their allies, the McQuillans were unready for the treachery that was to take place. Seeing an opportunity to expand his territory and influence, Sorley Boy MacDonnell, with the aid of levies from Scotland, launched a mass assault on the Route against the McQuillans. The final battle of this assault was at Aura, and saw the end of the McQuillans and the conquest of the Route by the MacDonnells.

It is claimed that the McQuillans were betrayed to the MacDonnells by a piper named O'Cahan. The end result of this bitter feud saw the McQuillans destroyed and the O'Cahans weakened in the face of an ever-growing English presence.
