= Bonamargy =

Townland in County Antrim, Northern Ireland

Coordinates: 55.2033°N 6.23195°W

Bonamargy (English: foot of the Margy River) is a townland in County Antrim, Northern Ireland, located on the Cushendall Road on the approach to Ballycastle at the foot of the Margy River. The ruins of Bonamargy Friary are located here.
