= Randal MacDonnell, 4th Earl of Antrim =

Randal MacDonnell, 4th Earl of Antrim (1680–1721) was an Irish aristocrat.

== Early life ==
His parents were Alexander MacDonnell, 3rd Earl of Antrim and Helena Burke. He had a young sister named Mary. Through his grandmother Ellis MacDonnell, Countess of Antrim he was descended from her father Hugh O'Neill, Earl of Tyrone and was, therefore, part of the extended O'Neill dynasty which had been the dominant family in Gaelic Ireland until the Flight of the Earls.

Randal's father was a leading Catholic, and supporter of James II in the Williamite War, unsuccessfully leading a force to capture Derry in 1688. He was thereby regarded by James II's victorious opponent William III to have forfeited the Earldom in 1689. However, the title was restored in 1697. Randal succeeded to the Earldom following his father's death in 1699. Like his father, he was suspected of Jacobite leanings.

He was succeeded by his son Alexander in 1721.

== Bibliography ==
- Ohlmeyer, Jane. Civil War and Restoration in the Three Kingdoms. The Career of Randall MacDonnell, Marquis of Antrim, 1609-1683. Cambridge University Press, 1993.

Peerage of Ireland
Preceded by Alexander MacDonnell	Earl of Antrim; 1699–1721	Succeeded by Alexander MacDonnell
