= 1993 Larne Borough Council election =

Local government election in Northern Ireland

← 1989	19 May 1993	1997 →

All 15 seats to Larne Borough Council 8 seats needed for a majority
	First party	Second party	Third party
Party	UUP	DUP	Alliance
Seats won	7	4	2
Seat change	0	0	0
	Fourth party	Fifth party	Sixth party
Party	Ind. Unionist	Ind. Nationalist	Independent
Seats won	1	1	0
Seat change	▲1	0	▼1
- Party with the most votes by district.

Elections to Larne Borough Council were held on 19 May 1993 on the same day as the other Northern Irish local government elections. The election used three district electoral areas to elect a total of 15 councillors.

== Election results ==
Larne Borough Council Election Result 1993
Party	Seats	Gains	Losses	Net gain/loss	Seats %	Votes %	Votes	+/−
UUP	7	0	0	0	46.7	45.6	4,360	▲2.9
DUP	4	0	0	0	20.0	27.5	2,626	▼1.6
Alliance	2	0	0	0	13.3	9.0	861	▼2.5
Ind. Nationalist	1	0	0	0	6.7	6.3	600	▼0.3
Ind. Unionist	1	1	0	▲1	6.7	3.5	339	▲3.5
Independent	0	0	1	▼1	0.0	5.8	551	▼4.4
NI Conservatives	0	0	0	0	0.0	2.3	216	New

Note: "Votes" are the first preference votes.

== Districts summary ==
Results of the Larne Borough Council election, 1993 by district
Ward	%	Cllrs	%	Cllrs	%	Cllrs	%	Cllrs	Total Cllrs
Ward	UUP		DUP		Alliance		Others		Total Cllrs
Coast Road	38.1	2	27.0	1	15.0	1	19.9	1	5
Larne Lough	66.2	3	27.2	2	0.0	0	6.6	0	5
Larne Town	32.4	2	28.2	1	12.4	1	27.0	1	5
Total	45.6	7	27.5	4	9.0	2	17.9	2	15

== Districts results ==
=== Coast Road ===
1989: 2 x UUP, 1 x DUP, 1 x Alliance, 1 x Independent Nationalist
1993: 2 x UUP, 1 x DUP, 1 x Alliance, 1 x Independent Nationalist
1989-1993 Change: No change

Coast Road - 5 seats
Party	Candidate	FPv%	Count				
Party	Candidate	FPv%	1	2	3	4	5
UUP	Thomas Robinson*	20.35%	612				
Ind. Nationalist	William Cunning*	19.95%	600				
UUP	Joan Drummond*	17.72%	533				
Alliance	Amelia Kelly*	14.99%	451	473.44	566.32		
DUP	Winston Fulton*	14.36%	432	457.08	457.89	494.08	515.59
DUP	Rachel Rea	12.63%	380	439.62	441.51	469.23	478.23
Electorate: 7,176 Valid: 3,008 (41.92%) Spoilt: 94 Quota: 502 Turnout: 3,102 (43.23%)

=== Larne Lough ===
1989: 3 x UUP, 2 x DUP
1993: 3 x DUP, 2 x UUP
1989-1993 Change: No change

Larne Lough - 5 seats
Party	Candidate	FPv%	Count				
Party	Candidate	FPv%	1	2	3	4	5
UUP	Roy Beggs*	51.82%	1,680				
UUP	Thomas Caldwell	5.31%	172	695.98			
DUP	Bobby McKee*	15.79%	512	607.14			
UUP	Alexander Hunter	3.73%	121	371.63	472.83	534.05	553.37
DUP	Samuel McAllister	11.38%	369	430.77	440.23	482.48	508.7
UUP	Samuel Steele*	5.31%	172	337.43	362.95	431.74	451.75
NI Conservatives	Gary Haggan*	6.66%	216	255.05	269.57		
Electorate: 7,406 Valid: 3,242 (43.78%) Spoilt: 141 Quota: 541 Turnout: 3,383 (45.68%)

=== Larne Town ===
1989: 2 x UUP, 1 x DUP, 1 x Alliance, 1 x Independent
1993: 2 x UUP, 1 x DUP, 1 x Alliance, 1 x Independent Unionist
1989-1993 Change: Independent Unionist gain from Independent

Larne Town - 5 seats
Party	Candidate	FPv%	Count					
Party	Candidate	FPv%	1	2	3	4	5	6
DUP	Jack McKee*	25.76%	851					
UUP	Rosalie Armstrong*	17.59%	581					
UUP	Robert Robinson*	12.66%	418	466.65	518.45	541.1	548.2	583.2
Alliance	Patricia Kay*	12.41%	410	413.15	417.15	418.3	546.3	553.6
Ind. Unionist	Lindsay Mason	10.26%	339	350.55	352.55	353.5	436.5	468.25
Independent	Roy Craig	8.39%	277	286.45	292.45	294.45	326.5	363.75
DUP	Leonard Sluman	2.48%	82	289.55	294	294.55	297.9	
Independent	Pat Buckley*	8.30%	274	274.35	275.35	275.5		
UUP	May Steele	2.15%	71	79.05				
Electorate: 7,773 Valid: 3,303 (42.29%) Spoilt: 85 Quota: 551 Turnout: 3,388 (43.59%)
