= 1997 Larne Borough Council election =

Local government election in Northern Ireland

← 1993	21 May 1997	2001 →

All 15 seats to Larne Borough Council 8 seats needed for a majority
	First party	Second party	Third party
Party	UUP	DUP	Independent
Seats won	6	3	2
Seat change	▼1	▼1	▲2
	Fourth party	Fifth party	Sixth party
Party	Alliance	SDLP	Ind. Unionist
Seats won	1	1	1
Seat change	▼1	▲1	0
	Seventh party
Party	Ind. Nationalist
Seats won	1
Seat change	0
- Results by district electoral area, shaded by First Preference Votes.

Elections to Larne Borough Council were held on 21 May 1997 on the same day as the other Northern Irish local government elections. The election used three district electoral areas to elect a total of 15 councillors.

== Election results ==
Larne Borough Council Election Result 1997
Party	Seats	Gains	Losses	Net gain/loss	Seats %	Votes %	Votes	+/−
UUP	6	0	1	▼1	40.0	36.4	3,532	▼9.2
DUP	3	0	1	▼1	20.0	24.5	2,379	▼3.0
Alliance	1	1	2	▼1	6.7	12.2	1,179	▲3.2
Independent	2	2	0	▲2	13.3	11.6	1,123	▲2.3
SDLP	1	0	0	▲1	6.7	4.2	409	▲4.2
Ind. Nationalist	1	0	0	0	6.7	5.2	502	▼1.1
Ind. Unionist	1	0	0	0	6.7	4.8	462	▲1.3
PUP	0	0	0	0	0.0	1.2	116	▲1.2

Note: "Votes" are the first preference votes.

== Districts summary ==
Results of the Larne Borough Council election, 1997 by district
Ward	%	Cllrs	%	Cllrs	%	Cllrs	%	Cllrs	%	Cllrs	Total Cllrs
Ward	UUP		DUP		Alliance		SDLP		Others		Total Cllrs
Coast Road	32.4	2	25.4	1	10.3	0	13.3	1	18.6	1	5
Larne Lough	55.4	3	25.3	1	15.8	1	0.0	0	3.5	0	5
Larne Town	20.9	1	22.9	1	10.2	0	0.0	0	46.0	3	5
Total	36.4	6	24.5	3	12.2	1	4.2	2	22.7	4	15

== Districts results ==
=== Coast Road ===
1993: 2 x UUP, 1 x DUP, 1 x Alliance, 1 x Independent Nationalist
1997: 2 x UUP, 1 x DUP, 1 x SDLP, 1 x Independent Nationalist
1993-1997 Change: SDLP gain from Alliance

Coast Road - 5 seats
Party	Candidate	FPv%	Count				
Party	Candidate	FPv%	1	2	3	4	5
UUP	Thomas Robinson*	17.09%	527				
UUP	Joan Drummond*	15.34%	473	522			
Ind. Nationalist	William Cunning*	16.28%	502	506	506.21	573.21	
SDLP	Danny O'Connor	13.27%	409	414	414.3	530.3	
DUP	Rachel Rea	10.15%	313	388	398.2	423.98	428.98
DUP	Winston Fulton*	10.18%	314	365	370.58	394.87	401.87
Alliance	Amelia Kelly*	10.28%	317	347	351.38		
DUP	George Robinson	5.03%	155				
Independent	Norman McCann	2.37%	73				
Electorate: 7,255 Valid: 3,083 (42.49%) Spoilt: 82 Quota: 514 Turnout: 3,165 (43.63%)

=== Larne Lough ===
1993: 3 x UUP, 2 x DUP
1997: 3 x DUP, 1 x UUP, 1 x Alliance
1993-1997 Change: Alliance gain from DUP

Larne Lough - 5 seats
Party	Candidate	FPv%	Count				
Party	Candidate	FPv%	1	2	3	4	5
UUP	Roy Beggs*	31.32%	1,043				
UUP	David Fleck	7.96%	265	480.73	527.83	655.83	
Alliance	John Mathews	15.80%	526	536.81	554.22	566.22	
UUP	John Hall	8.92%	297	344	362.76	488.79	576.09
DUP	Bobby McKee*	11.08%	369	405.19	497.77	521.76	523.56
DUP	Samuel McAllister*	9.01%	300	330.55	440.19	480	489.9
UUP	Alexander Hunter*	7.21%	240	339.17	358.34		
DUP	Sharon Gardiner	5.23%	174	197.03			
PUP	George Ferguson	3.48%	116	133.39			
Electorate: 7,838 Valid: 3,330 (42.49%) Spoilt: 95 Quota: 556 Turnout: 3,425 (43.70%)

=== Larne Town ===
1993: 2 x UUP, 1 x UUP, 1 x Alliance, 1 x Independent Unionist
1997: 2 x Independent, 1 x DUP, 1 x UUP, 1 x Independent Unionist
1993-1997 Change: Independent (two seats) gain from UUP and Alliance

Larne Town - 5 seats
Party	Candidate	FPv%	Count				
Party	Candidate	FPv%	1	2	3	4	5
Independent	John Nixon	21.22%	698				
DUP	Jack McKee*	20.16%	663				
UUP	Rosalie Armstrong*	14.75%	485	500.18	531.72	670.72	
Independent	Roy Craig	10.70%	352	413.38	426.04	468.42	525.42
Ind. Unionist	Lindsay Mason*	14.05%	462	488.4	496.62	508.94	517.94
Alliance	Patricia Kay*	10.22%	336	364.38	364.82	375.8	394.8
UUP	May Steele	6.14%	202	213.88	236.54		
DUP	Gregg McKeen	2.77%	91	95.62			
Electorate: 7,785 Valid: 3,289 (42.25%) Spoilt: 59 Quota: 549 Turnout: 3,348 (43.01%)
