= 2005 Larne Borough Council election =

Local government election in Northern Ireland

← 2001	5 May 2005	2011 →

All 15 seats to Larne Borough Council 8 seats needed for a majority
	First party	Second party	Third party
Party	DUP	UUP	Alliance
Seats won	5	4	2
Seat change	Steady	Steady	Steady
	Fourth party	Fifth party
Party	SDLP	Independent
Seats won	2	2
Seat change	Steady	Steady
- Party with the most votes by district.

Elections to Larne Borough Council were held on 5 May 2005 on the same day as the other Northern Irish local government elections. The election used three district electoral areas to elect a total of 15 councillors.

There was no change from the prior election.

== Election results ==
Larne Borough Council Election Result 2005
Party	Seats	Gains	Losses	Net gain/loss	Seats %	Votes %	Votes	+/−
DUP	5	0	0	Steady	33.3	35.0	4,104	▲6.2
UUP	4	0	0	Steady	26.7	26.5	3,102	▼2.3
Alliance	2	0	0	Steady	13.3	12.4	1,448	▼2.1
Independent	2	0	0	Steady	13.3	11.6	1,363	▼2.3
SDLP	2	0	0	Steady	13.3	9.2	1,075	▼0.4
Sinn Féin	0	0	0	Steady	0.0	3.8	441	▲0.2
PUP	0	0	0	Steady	0.0	1.1	131	▲0.3
Green (NI)	0	0	0	Steady	0.0	0.4	46	▲0.4

Note: "Votes" are the first preference votes.

== Districts summary ==
Results of the Larne Borough Council election, 2005 by district
Ward	%	Cllrs	%	Cllrs	%	Cllrs	%	Cllrs	%	Cllrs	Total Cllrs
Ward	DUP		UUP		Alliance		SDLP		Others		Total Cllrs
Coast Road	34.2	2	20.7	1	11.2	1	15.4	1	18.5	1	5
Larne Lough	38.8	2	42.3	2	18.9	1	0.0	0	0.0	0	5
Larne Town	30.3	1	11.7	1	5.0	0	14.7	1	38.3	2	5
Total	35.0	5	26.5	4	12.4	2	9.2	2	16.9	2	15

== Districts results ==
=== Coast Road ===
2001: 2 x DUP, 1 x UUP, 1 x SDLP, 1 x Alliance
2005: 2 x DUP, 1 x UUP, 1 x SDLP, 1 x Alliance
2001-2005 Change: No change

Coast Road - 5 seats
Party	Candidate	FPv%	Count				
Party	Candidate	FPv%	1	2	3	4	5
DUP	Winston Fulton*	21.01%	770				
DUP	Rachel Rea*	13.83%	507	644.76			
SDLP	Danny O'Connor*	15.39%	564	564.42	640.42		
UUP	Brian Dunn*	13.67%	501	511.08	519.29	748.29	
Alliance	Gerardine Mulvenna*	12.03%	441	444.36	478.36	495.09	606.09
Sinn Féin	James McKeown	11.21%	411	411	476	477	478
UUP	Joan Drummond*	7.07%	259	265.93	271.93		
Independent	William Cunning	5.78%	212	212.21			
Electorate: 6,653 Valid: 3,665 (55.09%) Spoilt: 82 Quota: 611 Turnout: 3,747 (56.32%)

=== Larne Lough ===
2001: 2 x DUP, 2 x UUP, 1 x Alliance
2005: 2 x DUP, 2 x UUP, 1 x Alliance
2001-2005 Change: No change

Larne Lough - 5 seats
Party	Candidate	FPv%	Count		
Party	Candidate	FPv%	1	2	3
DUP	Bobby McKee*	34.79%	1,589		
UUP	Roy Beggs*	20.39%	931		
Alliance	John Mathews*	18.87%	862		
DUP	Gregg McKeen*	9.15%	418	1,195.51	
UUP	Andrew Wilson	12.81%	585	619.45	916.25
UUP	Jonathan Moore	3.99%	182	194.19	315.03
Electorate: 8,574 Valid: 4,567 (53.27%) Spoilt: 91 Quota: 762 Turnout: 4,658 (54.33%)

=== Larne Town ===
2001: 2 x Independent, 1 x DUP, 1 x SDLP, 1 x UUP
2005: 2 x Independent, 1 x DUP, 1 x SDLP, 1 x UUP
2001-2005 Change: No change

Larne Town - 5 seats
Party	Candidate	FPv%	Count										
Party	Candidate	FPv%	1	2	3	4	5	6	7	8	9	10	11
DUP	Jack McKee*	27.02%	939										
SDLP	Martin Wilson*	14.71%	511	512.52	515.9	521.9	524.28	526.28	603.28				
Independent	Roy Craig*	12.52%	435	448.3	450.3	458.3	473.44	485.2	492.2	517.24	571.62	668.62	
Independent	Lindsay Mason*	7.02%	244	253.12	261.12	267.12	277.12	279.88	299.88	313.02	357.02	502.3	550.3
UUP	Mark Dunn	8.83%	307	327.52	329.52	334.52	343.9	423.42	431.42	463.18	494.94	525.32	549.32
DUP	Sharon McKeen	3.28%	114	393.3	395.3	400.3	404.68	413.96	414.96	469.8	477.18	495.46	501.46
Independent	John Anderson	7.08%	246	251.32	262.32	270.32	275.32	278.08	282.08	285.08	324.08		
Alliance	Elena Aceves-Cully	5.04%	175	176.52	185.52	187.52	191.52	193.52	197.52	199.52			
PUP	Bill Adamson	3.77%	131	142.78	143.78	146.78	147.78	150.54	152.54				
Independent	Robert Shaw	3.51%	122	122	126	126	128	129					
UUP	Maxi Burns	2.91%	101	107.46	107.46	109.6	116.36						
Independent	Thomas Robinson	1.64%	57	61.18	62.18	64.18							
Independent	David Todd	1.35%	47	48.14	50.14								
Green (NI)	Mary Ringland	1.32%	46	46.38									
Electorate: 6,447 Valid: 3,475 (53.90%) Spoilt: 60 Quota: 580 Turnout: 3,535 (54.83%)
