= 1989 Larne Borough Council election =

Local government election in Northern Ireland

| ← 1985 | 17 May 1989 | 1993 → |

All 15 seats to Larne Borough Council 8 seats needed for a majority
| | First party | Second party | Third party |
|---|---|---|---|
| Party | UUP | DUP | Alliance |
| Seats won | 7 | 4 | 2 |
| Seat change | ▲1 | ▼2 | 0 |
| | Fourth party | Fifth party |
| Party | Independent | Ind. Nationalist |
| Seats won | 1 | 1 |
| Seat change | ▲1 | 0 |

Elections to Larne Borough Council were held on 17 May 1989 on the same day as the other Northern Irish local government elections. The election used three district electoral areas to elect a total of 15 councillors.

== Election results ==
Larne Borough Council Election Result 1989
| Party | Seats | Gains | Losses | Net gain/loss | Seats % | Votes % | Votes | +/− |
|---|---|---|---|---|---|---|---|---|
| UUP | 7 | 1 | 0 | ▲1 | 46.7 | 42.7 | 4,502 | ▲5.4 |
| DUP | 4 | 0 | 2 | ▼2 | 26.7 | 29.1 | 3,046 | ▼10.3 |
| Alliance | 2 | 0 | 0 | 0 | 13.3 | 11.5 | 1,214 | ▼4.9 |
| Independent | 1 | 1 | 1 | ▲1 | 0.0 | 10.2 | 1,070 | ▲10.2 |
| Ind. Nationalist | 1 | 0 | 0 | 0 | 6.7 | 6.6 | 700 | ▼0.3 |

Note: "Votes" are the first preference votes.

== Districts summary ==
Results of the Larne Borough Council election, 1989 by district
| Ward | % | Cllrs | % | Cllrs | % | Cllrs | % | Cllrs | Total Cllrs |
| Ward | UUP | | DUP | | Alliance | | Others | | Total Cllrs |
|---|---|---|---|---|---|---|---|---|---|
| Coast Road | 36.0 | 2 | 30.0 | 1 | 13.1 | 1 | 20.9 | 1 | 5 |
| Larne Lough | 61.0 | 3 | 27.4 | 2 | 11.6 | 0 | 0.0 | 0 | 5 |
| Larne Town | 31.0 | 2 | 29.4 | 1 | 10.0 | 1 | 29.6 | 1 | 5 |
| Total | 42.7 | 7 | 29.1 | 4 | 11.5 | 2 | 16.7 | 2 | 15 |

== Districts results ==
=== Coast Road ===
1985: 2 x DUP, 1 x UUP, 1 x Alliance, 1 x Independent Nationalist
1989: 2 x UUP, 1 x DUP, 1 x Alliance, 1 x Independent Nationalist
1985-1989 Change: UUP gain from DUP

Coast Road - 5 seats
| Party | Candidate | FPv% | Count | | | |
| Party | Candidate | FPv% | 1 | 2 | 3 | 4 |
|---|---|---|---|---|---|---|
| UUP | Thomas Robinson* | 23.19% | 777 | | | |
| Ind. Nationalist | William Cunning* | 20.89% | 700 | | | |
| UUP | Joan Drummond | 12.80% | 429 | 554.72 | 561 | |
| DUP | Winston Fulton* | 14.26% | 478 | 496.48 | 560.44 | |
| Alliance | Amelia Kelly* | 13.10% | 439 | 446.84 | 454.4 | 592.32 |
| DUP | Rachel Rea* | 12.32% | 413 | 465.08 | 507.72 | 508.64 |
| DUP | Hill Taggart | 3.43% | 115 | 122 | | |
Electorate: 7,089 Valid: 3,351 (47.27%) Spoilt: 90 Quota: 559 Turnout: 3,441 (48.54%)

=== Larne Lough ===
1985: 3 x UUP, 2 x DUP
1989: 3 x DUP, 2 x UUP
1985-1989 Change: No change

Larne Lough - 5 seats
| Party | Candidate | FPv% | Count | | | | |
| Party | Candidate | FPv% | 1 | 2 | 3 | 4 | 5 |
|---|---|---|---|---|---|---|---|
| UUP | Roy Beggs* | 38.94% | 1,387 | | | | |
| UUP | Thomas Baxter* | 13.81% | 492 | 927.58 | | | |
| UUP | Samuel Steele* | 8.31% | 296 | 473.48 | 725.03 | | |
| DUP | Bobby McKee | 13.73% | 489 | 560.34 | 592.74 | 633.24 | |
| DUP | Gary Haggan | 6.85% | 244 | 294.46 | 320.56 | 365.11 | 569.16 |
| Alliance | Thomas Caldwell | 11.54% | 411 | 435.94 | 449.44 | 472.39 | 496.83 |
| DUP | William Sloan | 6.82% | 243 | 267.36 | 273.66 | 295.26 | |
Electorate: 7,198 Valid: 3,562 (49.49%) Spoilt: 116 Quota: 594 Turnout: 3,678 (51.10%)

=== Larne Town ===
1985: 2 x UUP, 2 x DUP, 1 x Alliance
1989: 2 x UUP, 1 x DUP, 1 x Alliance, 1 x Independent
1985-1989 Change: Independent gain from DUP

Larne Town - 5 seats
| Party | Candidate | FPv% | Count | | | | |
| Party | Candidate | FPv% | 1 | 2 | 3 | 4 | 5 |
|---|---|---|---|---|---|---|---|
| DUP | Jack McKee* | 25.76% | 979 | | | | |
| Independent | Pat Buckley | 23.63% | 855 | | | | |
| UUP | Robert Robinson* | 16.03% | 580 | 630.31 | | | |
| UUP | Rosalie Armstrong* | 14.95% | 541 | 576.1 | 595.18 | 606.34 | |
| Alliance | Patricia Kay | 6.30% | 228 | 229.95 | 333.63 | 487.55 | 615.21 |
| DUP | Leonard Sluman* | 2.35% | 85 | 362.29 | 365.17 | 365.92 | 418.13 |
| Independent | Roy Craig | 5.94% | 215 | 223.97 | 280.85 | 301.85 | |
| Alliance | William Geddis | 3.76% | 136 | 136.39 | 202.27 | | |
Electorate: 7,298 Valid: 3,619 (49.59%) Spoilt: 91 Quota: 604 Turnout: 3,710 (50.84%)
