= 2001 Larne Borough Council election =

Local government election in Northern Ireland

← 1997	7 June 2001	2005 →

All 15 seats to Larne Borough Council 8 seats needed for a majority
	First party	Second party	Third party
Party	DUP	UUP	Alliance
Seats won	5	4	2
Seat change	▲2	▼2	▲1
	Fourth party	Fifth party	Sixth party
Party	SDLP	Independent	Ind. Unionist
Seats won	2	2	0
Seat change	▲1	0	▼1
	Seventh party
Party	Ind. Nationalist
Seats won	0
Seat change	▼1
- Party with the most votes by district.

Elections to Larne Borough Council were held on 7 June 2001 on the same day as the other Northern Irish local government elections. The election used three district electoral areas to elect a total of 15 councillors.

== Election results ==
Larne Borough Council Election Result 2001
Party	Seats	Gains	Losses	Net gain/loss	Seats %	Votes %	Votes	+/−
DUP	5	2	0	▲2	33.3	28.8	3,985	▲4.3
UUP	4	0	2	▼2	26.7	28.8	3,984	▼7.6
Alliance	2	1	0	▲1	13.3	14.5	1,999	▲2.3
Independent	2	0	0	0	13.3	13.9	1,928	▲2.3
SDLP	2	0	0	0	13.3	9.2	1,075	▼0.4
Sinn Féin	0	0	0	0	0.0	3.6	496	▲3.6
PUP	0	0	0	0	0.0	0.8	107	▼0.4

Note: "Votes" are the first preference votes.

== Districts summary ==
Results of the Larne Borough Council election, 2001 by district
Ward	%	Cllrs	%	Cllrs	%	Cllrs	%	Cllrs	%	Cllrs	Total Cllrs
Ward	DUP		UUP		Alliance		SDLP		Others		Total Cllrs
Coast Road	28.7	2	24.2	1	13.7	1	17.4	1	16.0	0	5
Larne Lough	35.6	2	38.4	2	23.1	1	0.0	0	2.9	0	5
Larne Town	21.3	1	22.3	1	5.4	0	12.8	1	38.2	2	5
Total	28.8	5	28.8	4	14.5	2	9.6	2	18.3	2	15

== Districts results ==
=== Coast Road ===
1997: 2 x UUP, 1 x DUP, 1 x SDLP, 1 x Independent Nationalist
2001: 2 x DUP, 1 x UUP, 1 x SDLP, 1 x Alliance
1997-2001 Change: DUP and Alliance gain from UUP and Independent Nationalist

Coast Road - 5 seats
Party	Candidate	FPv%	Count				
Party	Candidate	FPv%	1	2	3	4	5
DUP	Winston Fulton	17.49%	753				
SDLP	Danny O'Connor*	17.42%	750				
UUP	Joan Drummond*	14.26%	614	616	618.68	895.68	
Alliance	Gerardine Mulvenna	13.68%	589	701	701.2	721.2	
DUP	Rachel Rea*	11.27%	485	485	509.72	616.8	767.8
Independent	William Cunning*	8.80%	379	488	488	494.04	516.04
UUP	Thomas Robinson*	9.99%	430	431	432.44		
Sinn Féin	Martin Graffin	7.08%	305				
Electorate: 7,121 Valid: 4,305 (60.45%) Spoilt: 99 Quota: 718 Turnout: 4,404 (61.85%)

=== Larne Lough ===
1997: 3 x UUP, 1 x DUP, 1 x Alliance
2001: 2 x DUP, 2 x UUP, 1 x Alliance
1997-2001 Change: DUP gain from UUP

Larne Lough - 5 seats
Party	Candidate	FPv%	Count				
Party	Candidate	FPv%	1	2	3	4	5
DUP	Bobby McKee*	25.87%	1,314				
UUP	Roy Beggs*	24.57%	1,248				
Alliance	John Mathews*	23.06%	1,171				
DUP	Gregg McKeen	9.69%	492	914.17			
UUP	David Fleck*	7.36%	374	395.83	704.35	821.2	849.2
UUP	John Hall*	6.48%	329	342.69	424.77	551.46	615.97
Independent	William Small	2.97%	151	155.07	162.27	240.58	
Electorate: 8,552 Valid: 5,079 (59.39%) Spoilt: 154 Quota: 847 Turnout: 5,233 (61.19%)

=== Larne Town ===
1997: 2 x Independent, 1 x DUP, 1 x UUP, 1 x Independent Unionist
2001: 2 x Independent, 1 x DUP, 1 x UUP, 1 x SDLP
1997-2001 Change: SDLP gain from Independent, Independent Unionist becomes Independent

Larne Town - 5 seats
Party	Candidate	FPv%	Count									
Party	Candidate	FPv%	1	2	3	4	5	6	7	8	9	10
UUP	Brian Dunn	18.13%	804									
DUP	Jack McKee*	17.50%	776									
SDLP	Martin Wilson	12.85%	570	571.12	572.12	572.12	703.12	703.16	762.16			
Independent	Roy Craig*	8.80%	390	397.2	411.36	412.56	416.64	438.08	487.96	495.16	567.61	698.73
Independent	Lindsay Mason*	8.77%	389	393.96	405.12	406.12	434.28	465.56	513.88	520.18	570.68	690.64
Independent	William Adams	7.37%	327	332.28	349.84	350.96	352.96	370.28	403.56	405.36	458.04	541.41
Independent	John Anderson	6.58%	292	293.6	294.76	295.2	297.2	301.04	326.04	330.09	360.89	
UUP	Andrew Wilson	4.17%	185	217.48	233.8	235.72	237.76	299.68	319.16	321.86		
Alliance	Margaret Richmond	5.39%	239	241.4	242.48	242.56	257.64	258.92				
DUP	Alastair Holden	3.72%	165	169.48	194.72	218.52	218.52					
Sinn Féin	Janette Graffin	4.31%	191	191.32	191.32	191.36						
PUP	Bill Adamson	2.41%	107	109								
Electorate: 7,483 Valid: 4,435 (59.27%) Spoilt: 89 Quota: 740 Turnout: 4,524 (60.46%)
