= 1993 Northern Ireland local elections =

Uk local government elections

- 19 May 1993

All 582 council seats

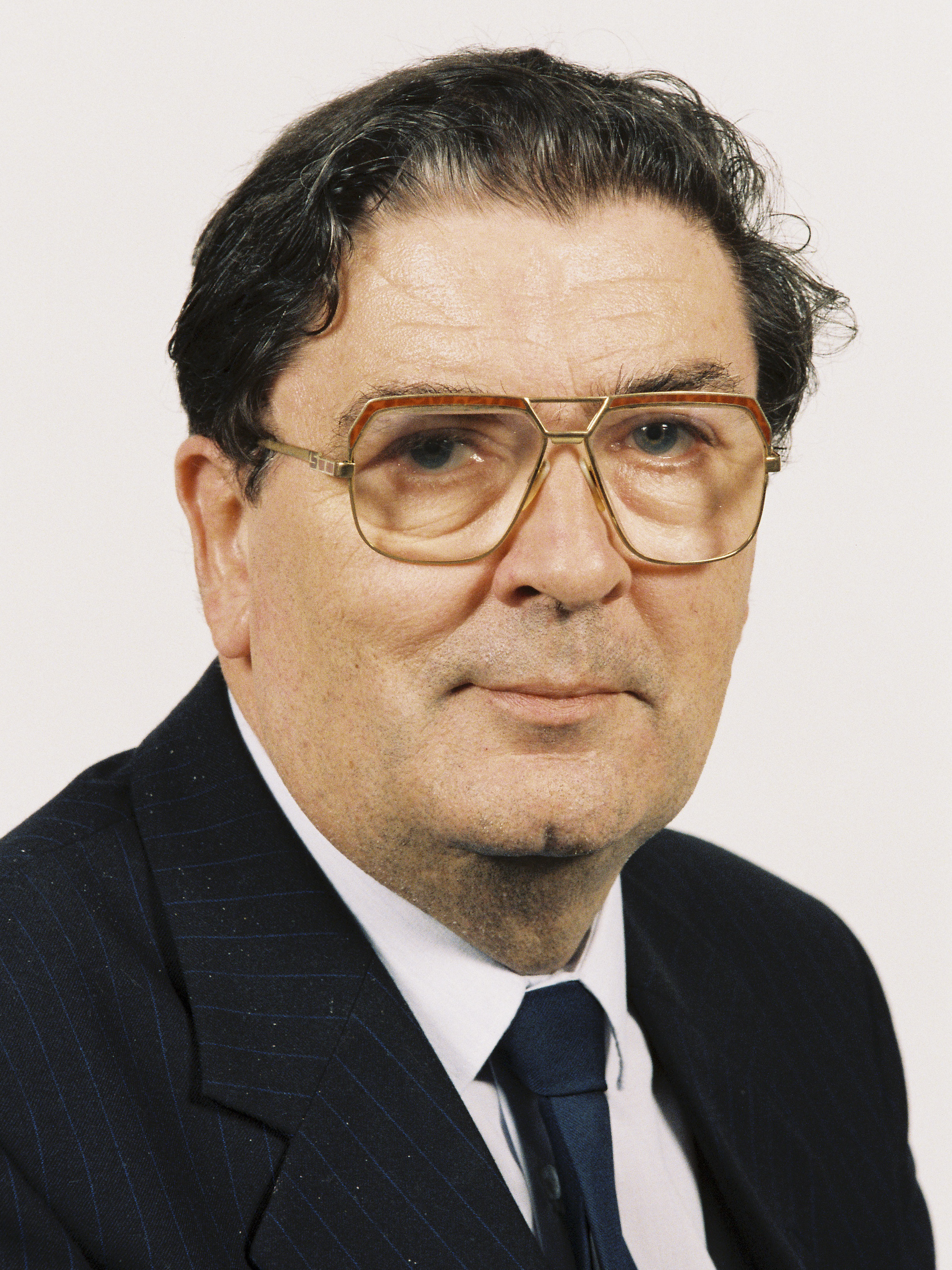

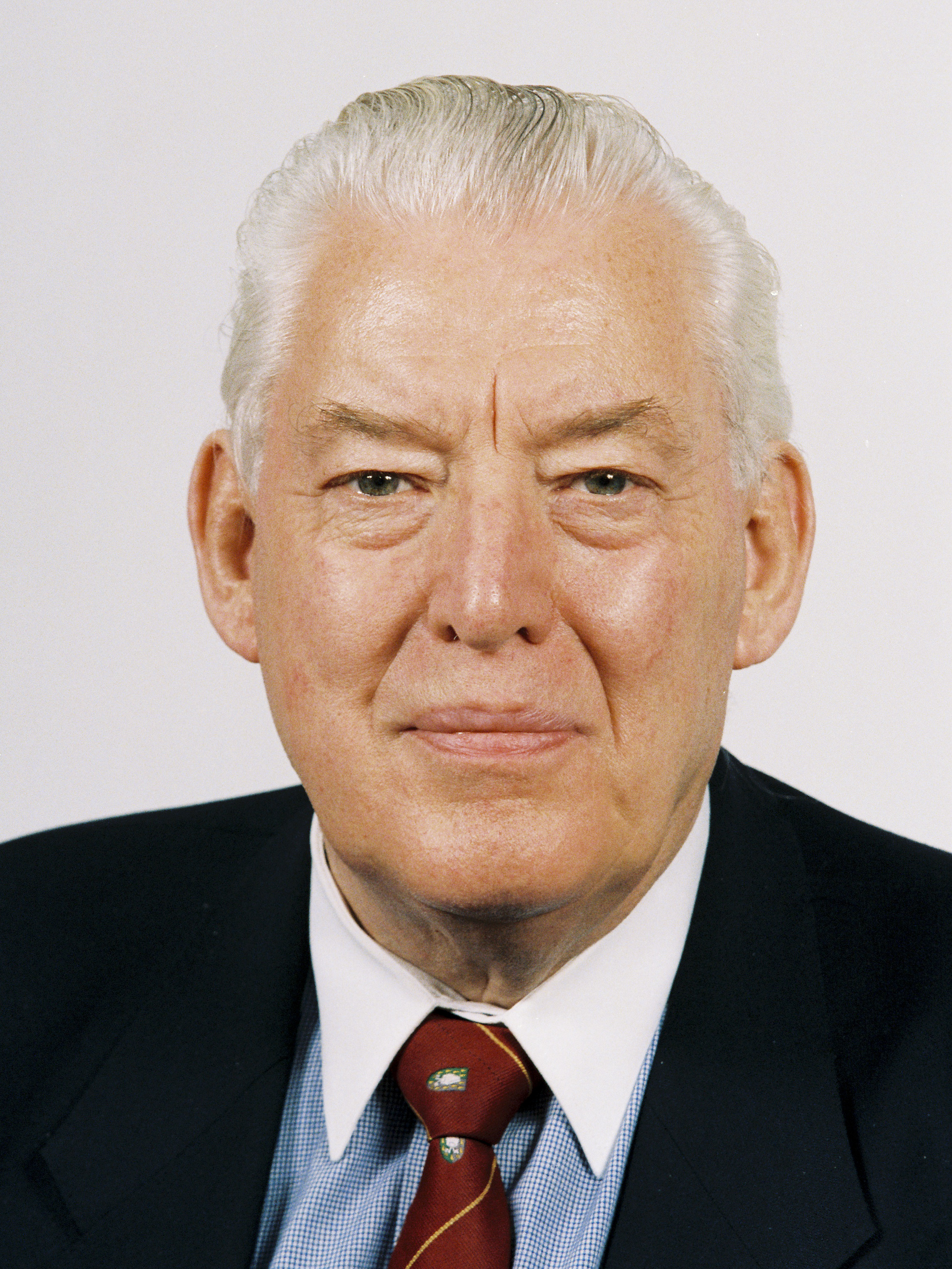

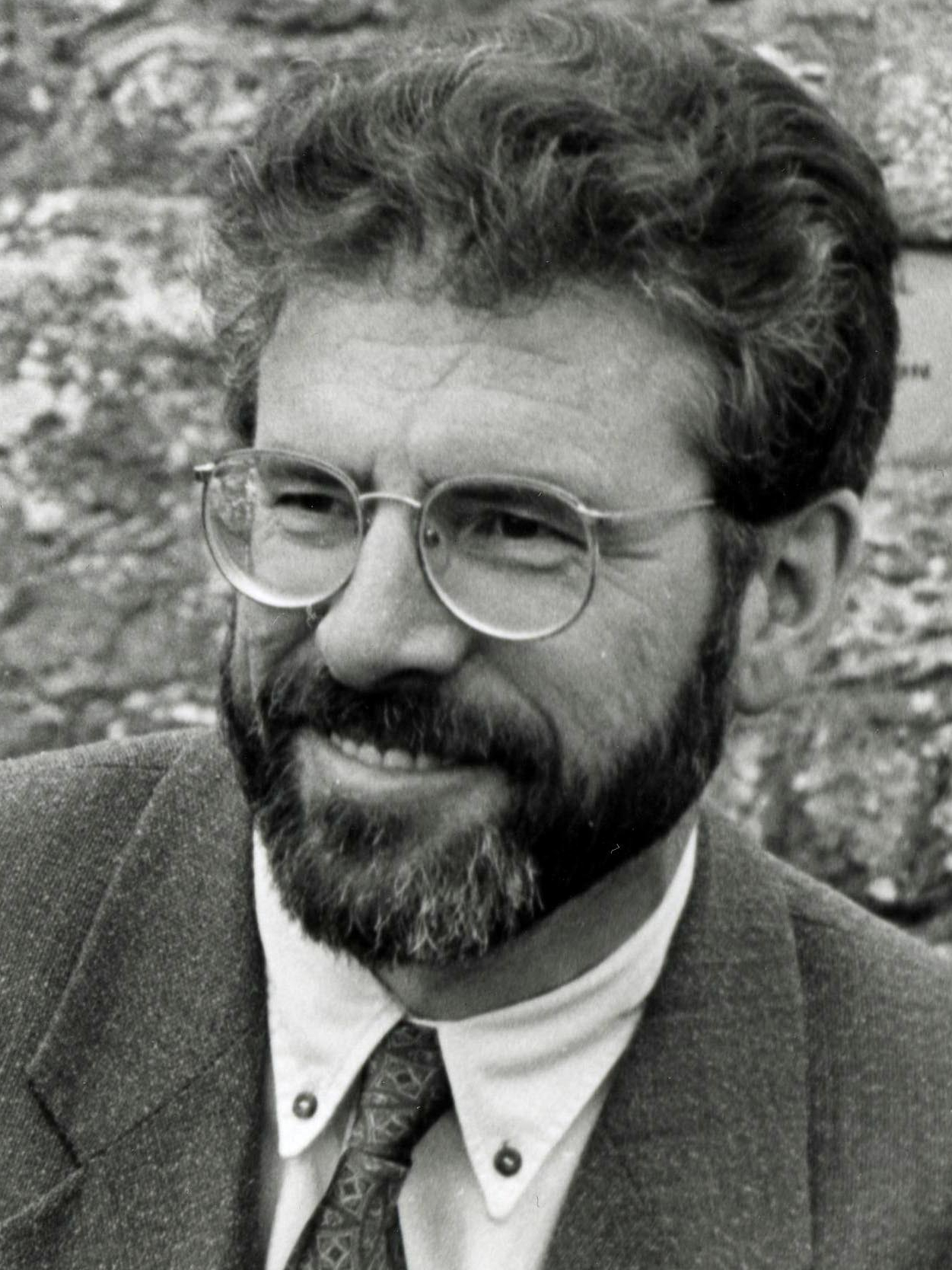

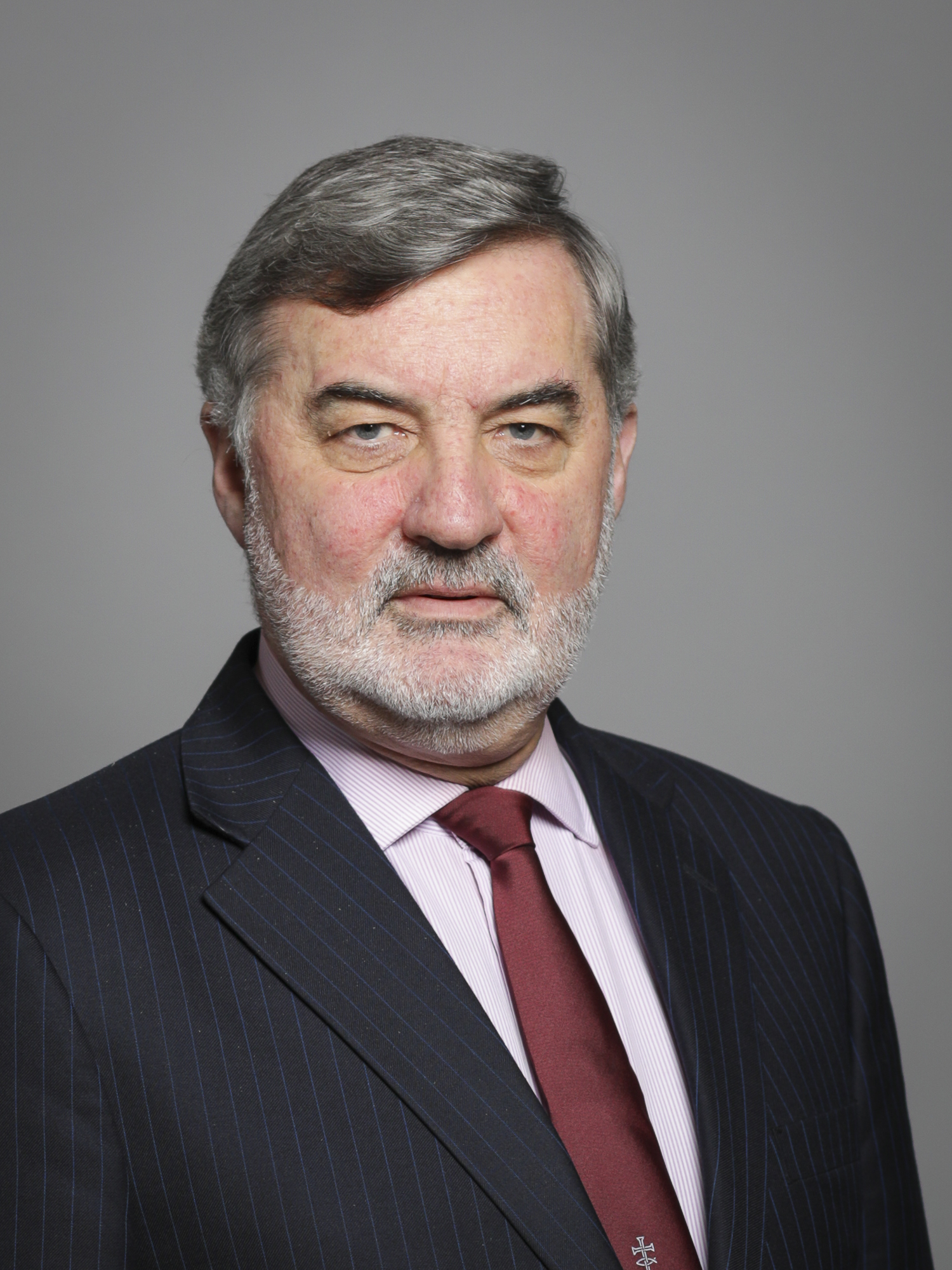

	First party	Second party	Third party
Leader	James Molyneaux	John Hume	Ian Paisley
Party	UUP	SDLP	DUP
Seats won	197	127	103
Seat change	▲3	▲6	▼6
Popular vote	184,082	136,760	108,680
Percentage	29.3%	21.7%	17.3%
Swing	▼2.0%	▲0.7%	▼0.4%
	Fourth party	Fifth party	Sixth party
Leader	Gerry Adams	John Alderdice	N/A
Party	Sinn Féin	Alliance	Independent
Seats won	51	44	24
Seat change	▲8	▲6	▲1
Popular vote	77,600	47,658	25,987
Percentage	12.3%	7.6%	4.1%
Swing	▲1.1%	▲0.7%	▲0.3%
- Colours denote the winning party with outright control

- Colours denote the party with a plurality of first preference votes in the District Electoral Areas (darker colours indicate that the party has a majority of first preference votes in that DEA)

Elections for local government were held in Northern Ireland on 19 May 1993.

== Results ==
=== Overall ===
Party	Councillors		Votes	
Party	Total	+/-	% share	Total
UUP	197	+3	29.3	184,082
SDLP	127	+6	21.7	136,760
DUP	103	-6	17.3	108,680
Sinn Féin	51	+8	12.3	77,600
Alliance	44	+6	7.6	47,658
Independent	24	+1	4.1	25,987
Ind. Unionist	21	+6	3	19,506
NI Conservatives	6	0	1	9,438
Workers' Party	1	-3	1	4,827
Newtownabbey Labour	1	0	1	3,981
PUP	1	-2	0.4	2,350
Democratic Left	1	+1	0.4	2,288
Ulster Democratic	1	0	0.4	2,181
UPUP	3	+1	0.3	1,730
Green (NI)	0	0	0.2	1,257
Action 93	1	+1	0.1	871

=== By council ===
==== Antrim ====
Election results, shaded by plurality of First Preference Votes

Antrim North West
Party	Candidate	1st Pref
UUP	James Graham	1,167
SDLP	Robert Loughran	1,151
DUP	Wilson Clyde	747
Sinn Féin	Henry Cushinan	628
SDLP	Donovan McClelland	437
UUP	Roderick Swann	269
Turnout		4,530
Sinn Féin gain from UUP		

Antrim South East
Party	Candidate	1st Pref
Ind. Unionist	Roy Thompson	1,280
UUP	Edgar Wallace	878
SDLP	Robert Burns	855
Alliance	David Ford	561
DUP	Samuel Dunlop	560
UUP	Mervyn Rea	546
UUP	Howard Campbell	432
DUP	William Harkness	396
UUP	Roy Stinson	199
Sinn Féin	Joseph McCavana	150
Turnout		5,985
Roy Thompson leaves DUP		
Alliance gain from DUP		

Antrim Town
Party	Candidate	1st Pref
UUP	Paddy Marks	791
UUP	Jack Allen	719
SDLP	Oran Keenan	665
DUP	James Brown	558
Alliance	James McConnell	399
UUP	Andrew Ritchie	298
Alliance	Mary Wallace	290
UUP	Andrew Thompson	252
Democratic Left	Patrick McGinley	179
DUP	James Porter	151
UUP	Avril Swann	150
Workers' Party	Eamon Gillen	82
Turnout		4,665
No change

==== Ards ====
Election results, shaded by plurality of First Preference Votes

Ards East
Party	Candidate	1st Pref
UUP	Thomas Benson	956
DUP	Jeffrey Magill	866
UUP	John Shields	741
Alliance	Laurence Thomson	721
DUP	St Clair McAlister	661
UUP	Ronald Ferguson	505
NI Conservatives	Gavin Walker	365
Turnout		4,935
New district

Ards Peninsula
Party	Candidate	1st Pref
Alliance	Kieran McCarthy	1,546
DUP	Jim Shannon	896
UUP	Robert Ambrose	713
Independent	James McMullan	656
DUP	Thomas Cully	485
UUP	Samuel Brown	261
Alliance	William Sheldon	216
Turnout		4,931
Seats reduced from seven to five: DUP & UUP loss, Independent gain

Ards West
Party	Candidate	1st Pref
UUP	Robert Gibson	1,318
DUP	Simpson Gibson	736
UUP	Margaret Craig	645
Alliance	Thomas McBriar	634
Alliance	Kathleen Coulter	616
DUP	Richard Finlay	481
NI Conservatives	Robert Darnley	292
UUP	Stanley McCoy	269
Turnout		5,109
Alliance gain from DUP		

Newtownards
Party	Candidate	1st Pref
UUP	David Smyth	817
Alliance	Alan McDowell	768
Independent	Nancy Orr	638
DUP	Wilbert Magill	554
DUP	George Ennis	545
Ind. Unionist	Bobby McBride	500
UUP	Tom Hamilton	458
DUP	John Purdy	214
NI Conservatives	Andrew Thomson	162
Turnout		4,797
Seats reduced from seven to six; DUP loss

==== Armagh ====
Election results, shaded by plurality of First Preference Votes

Armagh City
Party	Candidate	1st Pref
SDLP	John Agnew	1,156
SDLP	Pat Brannigan	1,012
UUP	Gordon Frazer	992
Sinn Féin	Noel Sheridan	961
SDLP	Anna Brolly	710
DUP	Harold Carson	690
UUP	Sylvia McRoberts	644
Turnout		6,347
No change

Crossmore
Party	Candidate	1st Pref
SDLP	Thomas Kavanagh	1,379
SDLP	James McKernan	1,028
UUP	Jim Nicholson	1,010
UUP	William Hamilton	858
SDLP	James Lennon	659
Sinn Féin	Brian Cunningham	562
SDLP	James McGleenan	534
Turnout		6,156
SDLP gain from UUP		

Cusher
Party	Candidate	1st Pref
UUP	Robert McWilliams	1,685
UUP	Eric Speers	1,572
SDLP	Thomas Canavan	1,164
DUP	Heather Black	1,050
UUP	Robert Turner	927
UUP	James Clayton	697
Sinn Féin	Margaret McNally	250
Turnout		7,472
No change

The Orchard
Party	Candidate	1st Pref
UUP	Jim Speers	1,620
SDLP	John Kernan	1,410
DUP	Brian Hutchinson	1,174
UUP	Charles Rollston	749
UUP	Olive Whitten	555
Sinn Féin	Brendan Casey	348
Turnout		5,949
No change

==== Ballymena ====
Election results, shaded by plurality of First Preference Votes

Ballymena North
Party	Candidate	1st Pref
Independent	Samuel Henry	964
SDLP	Patrick McAvoy	860
UUP	William Wright	820
Alliance	John Williams	727
UUP	James Alexander	681
Alliance	Ethel Kenny	494
UUP	Joseph McKernan	493
DUP	Maurice Mills	450
DUP	John Wilson	344
DUP	John Carson	290
Ulster Democratic	Samuel Balmer	95
Turnout		6,290
New district

Ballymena South
Party	Candidate	1st Pref
Ind. Unionist	William Brownlees	1,301
SDLP	Declan O'Loan	1,021
UUP	John Scott	828
UUP	James Currie	592
DUP	Martin Clarke	574
DUP	James McCosh	549
DUP	Frederick Coulter	266
DUP	John McKendry	234
Ulster Party	Agnes McLeister	224
Independent	Melvyn McKendry	91
Independent	Charles Magill	66
Turnout		5,887
New district

Bannside
Party	Candidate	1st Pref
UUP	Robert Coulter	1,239
UUP	John Johnston	904
SDLP	James Laverty	802
DUP	Thomas Nicholl	791
DUP	Roy Gillespie	663
DUP	Sandy Spence	662
DUP	Hubert Nicholl	652
Turnout		5,815
New district

Braid
Party	Candidate	1st Pref
UUP	David Clyde	1,304
UUP	Desmond Armstrong	1,039
UUP	Robert Forsythe	791
DUP	Samuel Hanna	653
DUP	David McClintock	437
DUP	Samuel Wallace	385
DUP	Samuel Martin	166
Turnout		4,918
New district

==== Ballymoney ====
Election results, shaded by plurality of First Preference Votes

Ballymoney Town
Party	Candidate	1st Pref
DUP	Cecil Cousley	636
Independent	Robert McComb	541
DUP	Samuel McConaghie	333
UUP	James Simpson	296
UUP	Thomas McKeown	269
UUP	Helen McKeown	214
Alliance	Hugh McFarland	181
Independent	Robert McVicker	174
Turnout		2,700
No change

Bann Valley
Party	Candidate	1st Pref
UUP	Joe Gaston	865
DUP	Robert Halliday	619
SDLP	Charley O'Kane	613
DUP	Robert Wilson	462
SDLP	Malachy McCamphill	346
UUP	John Watt	312
Sinn Féin	Pearse McMahon	288
DUP	Daniel Taylor	179
Turnout		3,764
No change

Bushvale
Party	Candidate	1st Pref
SDLP	Harry Connolly	752
DUP	Frank Campbell	490
UUP	William Logan	434
DUP	William Kennedy	395
UUP	John Ramsay	385
UUP	William Johnston	246
Turnout		2,776
No change

==== Banbridge ====
Election results, shaded by plurality of First Preference Votes

Banbridge Town
Party	Candidate	1st Pref
UUP	Kathleen Baird	1,352
SDLP	James Walsh	1,186
UUP	Archie McKelvey	722
UUP	John Dobson	517
UUP	Ian Burns	507
DUP	Margaret Davis	353
Alliance	Frank McQuaid	289
Turnout		5,014
Seats increased from five to six; UUP and Alliance gain, DUP loss

Dromore
Party	Candidate	1st Pref
UUP	Drew Nelson	980
SDLP	Catherine McDermott	951
DUP	David Herron	873
UUP	William Martin	771
UUP	William McCracken	745
UUP	Robert Hill	673
Turnout		5,063
DUP gain from UUP		

Knockiveagh
Party	Candidate	1st Pref
SDLP	Seamus Doyle	1,229
UUP	John Ingram	1,083
DUP	Wilfred McFadden	977
UUP	Violet Cromie	782
Independent	Laurence McCartan	732
UUP	John Hanna	672
UUP	Samuel Walker	614
SDLP	Liam McDermott	339
Turnout		6,535
Seats increased from five to six; UUP gain		

==== Belfast ====
Election results, shaded by plurality of First Preference Votes

Balmoral
Party	Candidate	1st Pref
SDLP	Dorita Field	2,262
DUP	John Parkes	2,076
UUP	Margaret Crooks	1,616
UUP	Jim Kirkpatrick	1,396
Alliance	Philip McGarry	1,273
Alliance	Mark Long	923
DUP	Harry Smith	697
UUP	Bob Stoker	611
NI Conservatives	Esmond Birnie	279
NI Conservatives	Billy Dickson	264
Green (NI)	Roderick McAlister	124
Independent Labour	Niall Cusack	113
Democratic Left	Jean Craig	97
NI Conservatives	Hubert Mullan	50
Workers' Party	Shaun McKeown	48
Turnout		12,160
DUP gain additional seat		

Castle
Party	Candidate	1st Pref
DUP	Nigel Dodds	2,470
UUP	David Browne	1,830
SDLP	Alban Maginness	1,589
UUP	John Carson	1,556
Alliance	Tom Campbell	1,172
SDLP	Jonathan Stephenson	1,090
Ind. Unionist	Nelson McCausland	1,070
Sinn Féin	Gerard McGuigan	575
Green (NI)	Alan Warren	251
NI Conservatives	Margaret Redpath	246
Workers' Party	Paul Treanor	136
Turnout		12,331
SDLP gain from Alliance		
UUP gain from Independent Unionist		

Court
Party	Candidate	1st Pref
DUP	Eric Smyth	2,385
UUP	Fred Cobain	1,674
PUP	Hugh Smyth	1,609
UUP	Chris McGimpsey	1,472
Ind. Unionist	Joe Coggle	792
UUP	Herbert Ditty	572
Protestant Unionist	Elizabeth Seawright	558
Alliance	Irene Galway	371
Workers' Party	Peter Cullen	116
Turnout		9,881
Seats reduced from six to five: Protestant Unionist loss

Laganbank
Party	Candidate	1st Pref
UUP	Jim Clarke	1,845
SDLP	Alasdair McDonnell	1,500
SDLP	Peter O'Reilly	1,052
DUP	Caroline Bingham	1,000
Sinn Féin	Sean Hayes	892
Alliance	Steve McBride	836
Alliance	Hugh Greer	727
UUP	Michael McGimpsey	545
UUP	Dennis Rogan	236
Workers' Party	Patrick Lynn	222
Green (NI)	Andrew Frew	202
NI Conservatives	Graham Montgomery	198
Militant	Peter Hadden	142
Democratic Left	Michael Craig	95
Turnout		9,805
SDLP gain from DUP		

Lower Falls
Party	Candidate	1st Pref
Sinn Féin	Tom Hartley	2,573
Sinn Féin	Fra McCann	2,393
Sinn Féin	Patsy McGeown	2,352
Sinn Féin	Marie Moore	1,946
SDLP	Mary Muldoon	1,749
SDLP	Margaret Walsh	987
Workers' Party	John Lowry	794
Alliance	Patrick Woods	108
Democratic Left	Mary McMahon	101
Turnout		13,512
Sinn Féin gain from Social Democratic and Labour		

Oldpark
Party	Candidate	1st Pref
Sinn Féin	Joe Austin	2,229
UUP	Fred Proctor	2,045
Sinn Féin	Paddy McManus	1,769
SDLP	Martin Morgan	1,763
Sinn Féin	Bobby Lavery	1,617
UUP	Fred Rodgers	1,343
DUP	David Smylie	1,324
Democratic Left	Seamus Lynch	853
SDLP	Peter Prendiville	588
Alliance	Beatrice Boyd	473
Green (NI)	Peter Emerson	393
Workers' Party	Margaret Smith	259
NI Conservatives	David Tarr	206
Turnout		15,373
Sinn Féin gain from Workers' Party		

Pottinger
Party	Candidate	1st Pref
DUP	Sammy Wilson	2,784
Alliance	Mervyn Jones	1,417
UUP	Reg Empey	1,295
DUP	Robert Clelland	982
UUP	Sandy Blair	897
DUP	Jim Walker	793
UUP	Margaret Clarke	768
Sinn Féin	Joe O'Donnell	709
NI Conservatives	Dorothy Dunlop	538
Independent Labour	Colin Ballentine	271
Workers' Party	Joseph Bell	227
Ind. Unionist	Samuel Walker	133
Green (NI)	Thaddeus Bradley	107
Turnout		11,389
DUP gain from Independent Unionist		

Upper Falls
Party	Candidate	1st Pref
SDLP	Alex Attwood	3,203
Sinn Féin	Una Gillsepie	2,765
Sinn Féin	Alex Maskey	2,735
Sinn Féin	Máirtín Ó Muilleoir	2,093
SDLP	Patricia Lewsley	798
SDLP	Terence Tracey	702
Independent	Cormac Boomer	378
DUP	David McNerlin	174
Workers' Party	James Maxwell	164
Alliance	Julie Greaves	145
Militant	Billy Lynn	144
Turnout		13,725
No change

Victoria
Party	Candidate	1st Pref
Alliance	John Alderdice	3,337
DUP	Wallace Browne	2,153
UUP	Tommy Patton	1,801
DUP	Robin Newton	1,729
UUP	Ian Adamson	1,316
Alliance	Maureen McConnell	768
NI Conservatives	Jim McCormick	684
UUP	Jim Rodgers	600
Alliance	Danny Dow	552
UUP	John Norris	407
Green (NI)	Michael Bell	180
Turnout		13,887
No change

==== Carrickfergus ====
Election results, shaded by plurality of First Preference Votes

Carrick Castle
Party	Candidate	1st Pref
Alliance	Sean Neeson	1,096
DUP	David Hilditch	696
Independent	William Hamilton	580
UUP	Samuel McCamley	231
PUP	Samuel Stewart	183
UUP	Robert McCartney	174
Alliance	Arthur McQuitty	92
Turnout		3,119
Independent gain from PUP		

Kilroot
Party	Candidate	1st Pref
Alliance	Janet Crampsey	850
UUP	James Brown	521
UUP	Alexander Beggs	463
NI Conservatives	Samuel Crowe	460
DUP	William Cross	403
Alliance	William Donaldson	389
Independent	Robert Patton	389
Independent Workers Representatives	Norman Dixon	229
DUP	Eric Higgins	145
Independent Workers Representatives	William Venables	123
NI Conservatives	Robert Wilson	101
UUP	Ronald Mowat	93
UUP	Eric Ferguson	56
Turnout		4,331
Seats increased from five to six; Alliance and NI Conservatives gain, DUP loss

Knockagh Monument
Party	Candidate	1st Pref
Alliance	Stewart Dickson	947
UUP	David Apsley	684
Independent	Charles Johnston	492
DUP	William Haggan	419
DUP	May Beattie	361
UUP	Joseph Reid	231
UUP	Mary McFall	175
Alliance	Noreen McIlwrath	146
NI Conservatives	Nicola Eakin	121
NI Conservatives	Charles Moffett	94
Turnout		3,766
Seats increased from five to six; Alliance and UUP gain, Independent Unionist loss

==== Castlereagh ====
Election results, shaded by plurality of First Preference Votes

Castlereagh Central
Party	Candidate	1st Pref
DUP	Peter Robinson	2,775
Alliance	Patrick Mitchell	782
UUP	Alan Carson	655
Ind. Unionist	Grant Dillon	340
Alliance	Ann Smith	185
NI Conservatives	Leeburn Stitt	126
DUP	Cecil Moore	113
UUP	Ellen Gray	103
DUP	Mary Fairfield	55
DUP	John Norris	47
UUP	John Ferris	28
Turnout		5,411
Seats reduced from seven to six; DUP loss
Grant Dillon leaves UUP		

Castlereagh East
Party	Candidate	1st Pref
DUP	Iris Robinson	2,690
Alliance	Peter Osborne	910
UPUP	Thomas Jeffers	557
UUP	John Bell	477
Ind. Unionist	William Abraham	419
DUP	Matthew Anderson	232
NI Conservatives	David Munster	231
NI Conservatives	Barbara Finney	210
DUP	Wilfred Kelly	92
DUP	Alexander Geddis	86
UUP	John Boyle	57
Turnout		6,086
No change

Castlereagh South
Party	Candidate	1st Pref
UUP	John Beattie	1,003
DUP	Beatrice Chambers	976
Alliance	Geraldine Rice	835
Alliance	Margaret Marshall	537
DUP	Charles Tosh	368
UUP	Marie Luney	363
NI Conservatives	Michael Henderson	281
NI Conservatives	Joyce Young	46
Turnout		4,527
Seats reduced from seven to five; UUP and DUP loss

Castlereagh West
Party	Candidate	1st Pref
UUP	John Taylor	1,549
DUP	Ernest Harper	989
Alliance	David Andrews	925
DUP	William Clulow	365
Alliance	Sara Duncan	238
NI Conservatives	Andrew Fee	210
UUP	William Stevenson	170
DUP	William Smyth	89
Turnout		4,655
New district

==== Coleraine ====
Election results, shaded by plurality of First Preference Votes

Bann
Party	Candidate	1st Pref
UUP	William Watt	1,072
UUP	Olive Church	1,028
UUP	William King	1,002
SDLP	John Dallat	969
SDLP	Gerard O'Kane	880
DUP	Robert Bolton	782
UUP	Robert McPherson	433
Alliance	Ian McEwan	171
Turnout		6,479
Seats reduced from seven to six; UUP loss

Coleraine Central
Party	Candidate	1st Pref
DUP	James McClure	1,206
UUP	Robert White	787
SDLP	Gerald McLaughlin	627
UUP	David McClarty	544
UUP	Elizabeth Johnston	387
Alliance	William Mathews	369
UUP	John Moody	336
UUP	Daniel Christie	329
Independent	Patrick McFeely	301
DUP	Donald Clifton	190
Alliance	Lara McIlroy	119
Turnout		5,278
New district

Coleraine East
Party	Candidate	1st Pref
UUP	Elizabeth Black	825
DUP	William Creelman	764
UUP	David Gilmour	436
UUP	William Glenn	435
UUP	William Johnston	393
DUP	Marie McAllister	308
Alliance	Hilary McCartney	251
Alliance	Amyan MacFadyen	118
Independent	Trevor Cooke	81
Turnout		3,736
New district

The Skerries
Party	Candidate	1st Pref
DUP	Robert Stewart	909
Alliance	Patrick McGowan	853
UUP	Pauline Armitage	772
UUP	Samuel Kane	544
UUP	Norman Hillis	510
Alliance	Catherine Condy	416
NI Conservatives	Robert Mitchell	250
DUP	Siobhan Watterson	98
Turnout		4,475
Seats reduced from seven to five; DUP and Independent Unionist loss

==== Cookstown ====
Election results, shaded by plurality of First Preference Votes

Ballinderry
Party	Candidate	1st Pref
SDLP	Patsy McGlone	1,314
Sinn Féin	Seamus Campbell	1,239
DUP	Anne McCrea	936
SDLP	Francis Rocks	848
UUP	Victor McGahie	689
UUP	Thomas Greer	686
DUP	Samuel McCartney	547
Sinn Féin	Noel Quinn	295
Turnout		6,765
UUP gain from DUP		

Cookstown Central
Party	Candidate	1st Pref
UUP	Trevor Wilson	1,514
SDLP	Denis Haughey	939
Sinn Féin	Martin Conlon	704
SDLP	Peggy Laverty	635
DUP	William Larmour	634
UUP	Ian Montgomery	405
DUP	Rodney Mitchell	172
Democratic Left	Edwin Espie	51
Militant Labour	Harry Hutchinson	44
Turnout		5,210
UUP gain from DUP		

Drum Manor
Party	Candidate	1st Pref
UUP	Samuel Glasgow	1,183
Sinn Féin	Sean Begley	1,073
SDLP	James McGarvey	839
Ind. Unionist	Samuel Parke	818
DUP	William Cuddy	665
SDLP	Sean Mallon	509
Sinn Féin	Finbar Conway	185
Turnout		6,335
No change

==== Craigavon ====
Election results, shaded by plurality of First Preference Votes

Craigavon Central
Party	Candidate	1st Pref
UUP	Kenneth Twyble	1,246
DUP	William Allen	1,172
Sinn Féin	Brendan Curran	865
SDLP	Pat Mallon	851
UUP	Frederick Crowe	767
SDLP	Gabriel O'Dowd	656
UUP	James McCammick	655
Alliance	Sean Hagan	602
UUP	Elizabeth McClurg	379
Workers' Party	Tom French	285
UUP	Pauline Lindsay	252
Turnout		7,980
Sinn Féin gain from UUP		

Loughside
Party	Candidate	1st Pref
SDLP	Sean McKavanagh	1,470
SDLP	Hugh Casey	1,294
Sinn Féin	Brendan McConville	1,261
SDLP	Dolores Kelly	817
UUP	John Crozier	567
Workers' Party	Peter Smyth	225
DUP	Anne Hanlon	134
Turnout		5,981
No change

Lurgan
Party	Candidate	1st Pref
UUP	Audrey Savage	1,472
DUP	Ruth Allen	1,179
Ind. Unionist	Sydney Cairns	965
UUP	Samuel Lutton	897
UUP	Meta Crozier	852
SDLP	Mary McNally	719
Alliance	Wilson Freeburn	586
DUP	David Martin	438
UUP	Donald MacKay	288
UUP	William McCullough	238
NI Conservatives	Colette Jones	208
Turnout		8,015
Sydney Cairns leaves UUP		
UUP gain from DUP		

Portadown
Party	Candidate	1st Pref
DUP	Mervyn Carrick	1,419
SDLP	Ignatius Fox	1,377
UUP	James Gillespie	1,346
UUP	Joe Trueman	1,003
Alliance	William Ramsay	600
UUP	Brian Maguinness	539
Sinn Féin	John Dunbar	523
UUP	Anna Moore	393
DUP	John Tate	286
Turnout		7,657
DUP gain from UUP		

==== Derry ====
Election results, shaded by plurality of First Preference Votes

Cityside
Party	Candidate	1st Pref
Sinn Féin	Hugh Brady	1,363
SDLP	James Clifford	1,089
SDLP	Patrick Devine	1,004
SDLP	Pat Ramsey	917
Sinn Féin	Bernadette Bradley	705
Sinn Féin	Dominic Doherty	623
Labour	Anthony Martin	189
Workers' Party	Eamon Melaugh	135
Turnout		6,274
Seats reduced from six to five; Sinn Féin loss

Northland
Party	Candidate	1st Pref
SDLP	John Tierney	1,506
Sinn Féin	Mitchel McLaughlin	1,380
SDLP	Mark Durkan	1,311
SDLP	Martin Bradley	1,162
Sinn Féin	Mary Nelis	758
SDLP	John Kerr	710
SDLP	Kathleen McCloskey	619
Ind. Unionist	David Davis	516
Independent	Tony Carlin	345
Ind. Nationalist	William McCorriston	291
UUP	Gladys Carey	231
Labour	Patrick Muldowney	187
Labour	Richard Foster	175
Alliance	Nigel Cooke	116
Workers' Party	Gordon McKenzie	42
Workers' Party	Noel Lynch	36
Turnout		9,625
Seats increased from six to seven; Sinn Féin and SDLP gain, Independent Unionist loss

Rural
Party	Candidate	1st Pref
SDLP	Annie Courtney	1,545
SDLP	John McNickle	1,049
DUP	William Hay	881
SDLP	George Peoples	844
UUP	Richard Dallas	790
DUP	Mervyn Lindsay	696
UUP	Ernest Hamilton	508
Sinn Féin	Bernard McFadden	450
UUP	George Duddy	383
SDLP	Patrick Murray	379
Turnout		7,725
Seats reduced from seven to six; UUP loss

Shantallow
Party	Candidate	1st Pref
SDLP	Mary Bradley	1,976
Sinn Féin	Gearoid O'Heara	1,116
SDLP	Shaun Gallagher	772
SDLP	Margaret McCartney	735
SDLP	William O'Connell	723
Sinn Féin	James McKnight	603
Labour	Robert Lindsay	295
DUP	William Dougherty	196
Workers' Party	Edward Sharkey	54
Turnout		6,702
No change

Waterside
Party	Candidate	1st Pref
DUP	Gregory Campbell	1,469
DUP	Joe Miller	1,157
SDLP	Gerald Toland	869
SDLP	Wilfred White	843
UUP	John Adams	830
Sinn Féin	Gary Fleming	780
DUP	Bill Irwin	743
Ind. Unionist	James Guy	617
UUP	Derry Burgess	395
Alliance	Snoo Sinclair	253
Ulster Democratic	James Millar	238
Ulster Democratic	Kenneth Kerr	231
UUP	Jacqueline Colhoun	214
UUP	William Houston	193
Community Candidate	David Nicholl	141
Labour	William Anderson	139
Turnout		9,338
Seats increased from six to seven; DUP and SDLP gain, UDP loss

==== Down ====
Election results, shaded by plurality of First Preference Votes

Ballynahinch
Party	Candidate	1st Pref
SDLP	Patrick Toman	1,480
SDLP	Anne Marie McAleenan	1,396
DUP	William Alexander	1,154
UUP	James Cochrane	939
UUP	Walter Lyons	488
UUP	Janet Crothers	368
Turnout		5,957
No change

Downpatrick
Party	Candidate	1st Pref
SDLP	Dermot Curran	1,075
SDLP	John Doris	1,037
SDLP	John Ritchie	1,031
UUP	Oliver Mcllheron	1,005
SDLP	Malachi Curran	724
SDLP	Francis McCann	569
SDLP	Owen Adams	476
Alliance	Michael Healy	443
Sinn Féin	Patrick McGreevy	314
Independent	Keith Bradford	291
Independent	Patrick O'Connor	236
Independent	James Masson	167
Workers' Party	Desmond O'Hagan	151
Turnout		7,669
SDLP gain from Alliance		

Newcastle
Party	Candidate	1st Pref
SDLP	Michael Boyd	1,405
SDLP	Eamon O'Neill	1,150
UUP	Gerald Douglas	948
SDLP	Peter Fitzpatrick	667
Alliance	Catherine Carr	528
Sinn Féin	Sean Fitzpatrick	501
DUP	John Finlay	430
SDLP	Frances Flynn	411
UUP	William Brown	396
Turnout		6,618
DUP gain from UUP		

Rowallane
Party	Candidate	1st Pref
UUP	Samuel Osborne	1,332
SDLP	Margaret Ritchie	1,171
DUP	William Dick	961
UUP	William Biggerstaff	952
UUP	Albert Colmer	882
SDLP	Hugh Flynn	510
Turnout		5,908
No change

==== Dungannon ====
Election results, shaded by plurality of First Preference Votes

Blackwater
Party	Candidate	1st Pref
DUP	James Ewing	1,038
SDLP	Patsy Daly	1,017
UUP	Jim Brady	837
UUP	Derek Irwin	834
UUP	Jim Hamilton	769
DUP	Robert McFarland	559
Sinn Féin	Anthony Fox	533
Turnout		5,685
No change

Clogher Valley
Party	Candidate	1st Pref
Sinn Féin	Raymond McMahon	1,141
UUP	Noel Mulligan	1,107
SDLP	Anthony McGonnell	1,065
DUP	Johnston McIlwrath	1,060
UUP	Robert Mulligan	861
SDLP	Bernadette McGirr	631
Turnout		5,964
No change

Dungannon Town
Party	Candidate	1st Pref
Sinn Féin	Vincent Kelly	1,180
DUP	Maurice Morrow	905
UUP	Leslie Holmes	801
UUP	William Brown	669
SDLP	Vincent Currie	589
UUP	Ken Maginnis	482
Democratic Left	Gerry Cullen	457
Ind. Nationalist	Michael McLoughlin	416
Ind. Unionist	Simon Dilworth	174
SDLP	Peggy Devlin	125
Turnout		5,873
Gerry Cullen leaves Workers' Party		
Sinn Féin gain from Independent		

Torrent
Party	Candidate	1st Pref
Sinn Féin	Francie Molloy	1,482
UUP	Norman Badger	1,320
Ind. Nationalist	Jim Canning	1,095
SDLP	Jim Cavanagh	825
Sinn Féin	Denise Sutton	771
Sinn Féin	Brendan Doris	711
SDLP	Joe Gervin	362
SDLP	Angela Donnelly	320
Turnout		7,052
Sinn Féin gain from SDLP		

==== Fermanagh ====
Election results, shaded by plurality of First Preference Votes

Enniskillen
Party	Candidate	1st Pref
UUP	Samuel Foster	1,605
UUP	Raymond Ferguson	1,159
Sinn Féin	John McManus	978
Progressive Socialist	David Kettyles	953
UUP	William Hetherington	736
SDLP	James Lunny	697
SDLP	James Donnelly	679
DUP	Joe Dodds	483
DUP	Frederick Black	388
UUP	Ethel Gregg	299
Turnout		8,108
David Kettyles leaves the Workers' Party

Erne East
Party	Candidate	1st Pref
SDLP	Fergus McQuillan	1,398
UUP	Jean McVitty	1,127
UUP	Cecil Noble	976
UUP	Albert Liddle	905
Sinn Féin	Brian McCaffrey	834
Sinn Féin	Gerry McHugh	784
Ind. Nationalist	Tony McPhillips	722
Independent	John Joe McCusker	563
DUP	Paul Robinson	480
Sinn Féin	Philip McDonald	431
Turnout		8,378
Seats reduced from seven to six: DUP and Sinn Féin loss, Independent Nationalist gain

Erne North
Party	Candidate	1st Pref
UUP	Caldwell McClaughry	1,486
DUP	Bert Johnston	1,032
SDLP	Tommy Gallagher	989
SDLP	John O'Kane	827
UUP	Bertie Kerr	674
UUP	Simon Loane	437
Sinn Féin	Desmond Donnelly	421
DUP	John Armstrong	192
Turnout		6,171
No change

Erne West
Party	Candidate	1st Pref
UUP	Wilson Elliott	1,507
Independent	Patrick McCaffrey	1,462
SDLP	Gerard Gallagher	1,039
Sinn Féin	Robin Martin	730
UUP	Derrick Nixon	601
Sinn Féin	Francis Doherty	548
Independent	Patrick Flanagan	541
Sinn Féin	Stephen Hugget	250
DUP	Jack Thompson	207
Turnout		7,065
No change

==== Larne ====
Election results, shaded by plurality of First Preference Votes

Coast Road
Party	Candidate	1st Pref
UUP	Thomas Robinson	612
Ind. Nationalist	William Cunning	600
UUP	Joan Drummond	533
Alliance	Amelia Kelly	451
DUP	Winston Fulton	432
DUP	Rachel Rea	380
Turnout		3,102
No change

Larne Lough
Party	Candidate	1st Pref
UUP	Roy Beggs	1,680
DUP	Bobby McKee	512
DUP	Samuel McAllister	369
NI Conservatives	Andrew Haggan	216
UUP	Samuel Steele	172
UUP	Thomas Caldwell	172
UUP	Alexander Hunter	121
Turnout		3,383
No change

Larne Town
Party	Candidate	1st Pref
DUP	Jack McKee	851
UUP	Rosalie Armstrong	581
UUP	Robert Robinson	418
Alliance	Patricia Kay	410
1990s	Lindsay Mason	339
Independent	Roy Craig	277
Community Candidate	Pat Buckley	274
DUP	Leonard Sluman	82
UUP	Mary Steele	71
Turnout		3,388
1990s gain from Independent		

==== Limavady ====
Election results, shaded by plurality of First Preference Votes

Bellarena
Party	Candidate	1st Pref
UUP	Stanley Gault	880
SDLP	Arthur Doherty	856
SDLP	Thomas Mullan	689
SDLP	John McKinney	661
UUP	Robert Grant	634
DUP	Ernest Murray	388
Turnout		4,183
No change

Benbradagh
Party	Candidate	1st Pref
UUP	David Robinson	1,042
SDLP	Michael Coyle	999
Sinn Féin	Thomas Donaghy	802
UUP	Max Gault	415
Sinn Féin	Kevin Kelly	327
SDLP	John Lynch	294
Turnout		3,976
No change

Limavady Town
Party	Candidate	1st Pref
DUP	George Robinson	884
SDLP	Barry Doherty	802
UUP	Ronald Cartwright	790
SDLP	Desmond Lowry	753
UUP	Jackie Dolan	720
UUP	Norman Reynolds	522
DUP	John Murray	86
Turnout		4,623
SDLP gain from UUP		

==== Lisburn ====
Election results, shaded by plurality of First Preference Votes

Downshire
Party	Candidate	1st Pref
UUP	Thomas Lilburn	1,104
DUP	Charles Poots	990
NI Conservatives	William Bleakes	945
UUP	William Falloon	818
Alliance	Kenneth Hull	796
UUP	William McConnell	579
DUP	James McCann	491
Ulster Democratic	David Adams	283
Turnout		6,130
Seats reduced from seven to five; UUP, DUP and Alliance loss, NI Conservatives gain

Dunmurry Cross
Party	Candidate	1st Pref
Sinn Féin	Patrick Rice	1,417
UUP	William McAllister	1,265
SDLP	Hugh Lewsley	1,076
Sinn Féin	Michael Ferguson	940
Sinn Féin	Annie Armstrong	781
SDLP	William McDonnell	695
UUP	Billy Bell	626
DUP	David Craig	463
Workers' Party	Anne-Marie Lowry	449
Alliance	Elizabeth Campbell	427
Independent	Peter McAnespie	281
Turnout		8,727
Sinn Féin gain from DUP		

Killultagh
Party	Candidate	1st Pref
UUP	Jim Dillon	1,550
DUP	Cecil Calvert	965
SDLP	Peter O'Hagan	890
UUP	Kenneth Watson	719
Alliance	Eileen Drayne	521
DUP	William Stevenson	500
UUP	David Greene	424
Turnout		5,684
Seats reduced from seven to five; UUP loss
David Greene joins Ulster Unionist		

Lisburn Town North
Party	Candidate	1st Pref
Ind. Unionist	Ronnie Crawford	1,394
DUP	William Beattie	1,266
UUP	Samuel Semple	737
UUP	William Lewis	722
Alliance	Frazer McCammond	720
Alliance	William Whitley	611
UUP	William Gardiner-Watson	607
Ulster Democratic	Ray Smallwoods	434
UUP	Doreen Martin	338
NI Conservatives	Leonard Jarvis	219
UUP	Andrew Park	147
DUP	Josephine Challis	140
Workers' Party	Johen Magee	100
Turnout		7,577
New district

Lisburn Town South
Party	Candidate	1st Pref
UUP	Ivan Davis	1,996
Alliance	Seamus Close	983
Ulster Democratic	Gary McMichael	900
UUP	William Belshaw	804
UUP	Joseph Lockhart	395
DUP	Robin McMaster	255
UUP	George Morrison	248
NI Conservatives	Anne Blake	238
DUP	Edwin Poots	208
UUP	John Curry	137
Alliance	Trevor Lunn	111
Workers' Party	Gerard Dunlop	49
Turnout		6,530
New district

==== Magherafelt ====
Election results, shaded by plurality of First Preference Votes

Magherafelt Town
Party	Candidate	1st Pref
DUP	William McCrea	2,142
SDLP	Patrick Kilpatrick	1,425
Sinn Féin	John Hurl	1,114
UUP	Ernest Caldwell	931
SDLP	Joseph McBride	719
UUP	George Shiels	300
DUP	Paul McLean	88
DUP	Daniel McAllister	32
Turnout		6,882
Seats increased from five to six; SDLP gain		

Moyola
Party	Candidate	1st Pref
SDLP	Patrick McErlean	1,276
UUP	John Junkin	831
Sinn Féin	Margaret McKenna	782
DUP	Thomas Wilson	672
DUP	Thomas Catherwood	671
UUP	Norman Montgomery	655
Sinn Féin	Paul Henry	454
SDLP	Francis Madden	262
Workers' Party	Patrick Scullion	142
Turnout		6,882
DUP gain from UUP		

Sperrin
Party	Candidate	1st Pref
Sinn Féin	Patrick Groogan	1,244
UUP	Robert Montgomery	1,064
SDLP	Kathleen Lagan	935
SDLP	Ghislaine O'Keeney	868
Sinn Féin	John Walsh	798
SDLP	Frank McKendry	652
DUP	Samuel Brown	384
Workers' Party	Francis Donnelly	221
Turnout		6,300
Sinn Féin gain from Independent		

==== Moyle ====
Election results, shaded by plurality of First Preference Votes

Ballycastle
Party	Candidate	1st Pref
DUP	Gardiner Kane	499
Independent	Christopher McCaughan	381
SDLP	Richard Kerr	313
Independent	Seamus Blaney	296
UUP	Helen Harding	196
Sinn Féin	Paul Little	151
SDLP	Anna Edwards	150
SDLP	Michael O'Cleary	116
Independent	Archibald McAuley	94
Independent	Elizabeth McConaghy	11
Turnout		2,248
No change

Giant's Causeway
Party	Candidate	1st Pref
Ind. Unionist	Price McConaghy	465
Ind. Unionist	Robert McIlroy	321
DUP	Thomas Brennan	254
DUP	David McAllister	238
UUP	Robert Getty	180
UUP	Robert Thompson	118
Ind. Unionist	James Rodgers	115
UUP	Ronnie McIlvar	49
Christian	Thomas Palmer	16
Turnout		1,796
No change

The Glens
Party	Candidate	1st Pref
Ind. Republican	Oliver McMullan	538
SDLP	Malachy McSparran	509
Sinn Féin	James McCarry	397
SDLP	Patrick McBride	359
Ind. Nationalist	Randal McDonnell	340
SDLP	Joseph Mitchell	248
DUP	Elizabeth Brennan	220
Turnout		1,796
Independent Nationalist gain from SDLP		

==== Newry and Mourne ====
Election results, shaded by plurality of First Preference Votes

Crotlieve
Party	Candidate	1st Pref
SDLP	Peadar Bradley	1,698
SDLP	Hugh Carr	1,085
UUP	Gordon Heslip	1,058
Ind. Nationalist	Anthony Williamson	1,057
Ind. Nationalist	Ciaran Mussen	959
SDLP	Mary O'Hare	890
SDLP	Jim McCart	829
SDLP	Brian Mulligan	602
Sinn Féin	Anne Marie Willis	421
Workers' Party	Raymond McEvoy	116
Turnout		8,942
Independent Nationalist gain from SDLP		

Newry Town
Party	Candidate	1st Pref
Sinn Féin	Davy Hyland	997
UUP	William McCaigue	903
Sinn Féin	Brendan Curran	832
SDLP	Patrick McElroy	830
SDLP	Arthur Ruddy	824
SDLP	Frank Feely	682
SDLP	Sean Gallogly	638
Independent	Jackie Patterson	598
SDLP	Patrick Courtney	533
Independent	Richard Rodgers	395
Independent	James Markey	326
Workers' Party	Anthony Hutchinson	265
Independent Labour	Noel Sloan	210
Turnout		8,329
Sinn Féin gain from SDLP		

Slieve Gullion
Party	Candidate	1st Pref
SDLP	John Fee	1,227
Sinn Féin	Jim McAllister	1,086
Sinn Féin	Patrick McDonald	1,028
SDLP	Pat Toner	865
SDLP	Terry Mulkerns	795
Sinn Féin	Patrick Brennan	698
SDLP	Michael McShane	412
Turnout		6,319
No change

The Fews
Party	Candidate	1st Pref
UUP	Danny Kennedy	1,765
SDLP	Stephen McGinn	1,205
SDLP	Charles Smyth	974
SDLP	James Savage	959
UUP	Arthur Lockhart	794
Sinn Féin	Conor Murphy	761
Sinn Féin	James McCreesh	554
Turnout		7,282
No change

The Mournes
Party	Candidate	1st Pref
UUP	Henry Reilly	1,647
UUP	Isaac Hanna	1,488
SDLP	Desmond Haughian	1,483
SDLP	Austin Crawford	986
DUP	William Burns	856
Sinn Féin	Michael McAleenan	242
Turnout		6,893
DUP gain from "Protestant"		

==== Newtownabbey ====
Election results, shaded by plurality of First Preference Votes

Antrim Line
Party	Candidate	1st Pref
SDLP	Tommy McTeague	1,271
Ind. Unionist	Arthur Templeton	1,248
UUP	Edward Crilly	904
DUP	Billy Blair	873
Alliance	James Rooney	728
DUP	Tommy Kirkham	621
Alliance	Elizabeth Frazer	575
UUP	Joseph Kell	563
UUP	Marell Hunter	251
Workers' Party	Brendan Harrison	87
Turnout		7,281
Seats increased from five to seven; Alliance and Independent Unionist gain

Ballyclare
Party	Candidate	1st Pref
Ind. Unionist	Sidney Cameron	942
UUP	Stephen Turkington	872
DUP	Sam Cameron	701
UUP	Thomas Bingham	585
Alliance	Trevor Strain	511
UUP	Leonard Hardy	311
DUP	Greg Steele	267
Turnout		4,301
UUP gain from Independent Unionist		

Macedon
Party	Candidate	1st Pref
UUP	Andrew Beattie	907
Newtownabbey Labour Party	Mark Langhammer	813
Alliance	John Blair	769
DUP	Billy Snoddy	649
Newtownabbey Labour Party	Robert Kidd	607
UUP	David Hollis	546
Ind. Unionist	Billy Boyd	508
DUP	Billy De Courcy	486
UUP	Samuel Martin	145
Ind. Unionist	Norman Boyd	88
Newtownabbey Labour Party	Thomas Davidson	56
Turnout		5,792
New district

University
Party	Candidate	1st Pref
Ind. Unionist	Fraser Agnew	1,169
UUP	George Herron	861
Alliance	Gordon Mawhinney	583
Alliance	William McKimmon	573
DUP	Tony Lough	542
UUP	Ken Robinson	534
UUP	James Robinson	524
DUP	Alan Hewitt	445
DUP	Samuel Neill	382
UUP	Barbara Gilliand	361
UUP	Elizabeth McClenaghan	220
Newtownabbey Labour Party	Deborah Hayes	112
Newtownabbey Labour Party	Stafford Ward	59
Newtownabbey Labour Party	William McClinton	44
Turnout		6,557
New district

==== North Down ====
Election results, shaded by plurality of First Preference Votes

Abbey
Party	Candidate	1st Pref
UPUP	Valerie Kinghan	719
Alliance	Stephen Farry	611
UPUP	Cecil Braniff	454
DUP	Ivy Cooling	410
UUP	Irene Cree	408
DUP	Geoffrey Bairsto	403
NI Conservatives	Ann Thompson	368
Action 1993	William Gordon	366
UUP	Karl McLean	199
Turnout		4,071
No change

Ballyholme and Groomsport
Party	Candidate	1st Pref
Independent	Alan Chambers	1,892
DUP	Raymond Stewart	830
UUP	Leslie Cree	679
Alliance	Marsden Fitzsimons	652
Alliance	Siobhan Laird	412
NI Conservatives	Bruce Mulligan	326
Action 1993	Austen Lennon	289
UUP	James Kingan	229
UUP	Ian Henry	211
NI Conservatives	Bill McLean	136
Ind. Conservative	Ivan Thompson	131
NI Conservatives	William Palmer	118
Turnout		6,015
Seats increased from six to seven; UUP and Independent gain, Independent Unionist loss

Bangor West
Party	Candidate	1st Pref
Alliance	Brian Wilson	1,228
DUP	William Baxter	805
UUP	Hazel Bradford	754
Alliance	Helen Bell	603
UUP	Roy Bradford	394
NI Conservatives	George Green	342
Ind. Unionist	Ian Sinclair	286
NI Conservatives	James O'Fee	267
DUP	Harold Blemings	247
Independent	Ann-Marie Foster	148
Independent	Ernest Steele	145
Action 1993	Arthur Gadd	115
NI Conservatives	Elizabeth Maguire	113
Action 1993	Robert Mooney	101
Independent	Edward Lindsay	58
Turnout		5,795
Alliance gain from NI Conservatives		
Independent Unionist gain from Independent		

Holywood
Party	Candidate	1st Pref
Independent	Dennis Ogborn	871
UUP	Ellie McKay	835
Alliance	Susan O'Brien	675
DUP	Gordon Dunne	523
NI Conservatives	Laurence Kennedy	414
Independent	James White	341
Alliance	John Coates	339
Independent	Robert Irvine	310
NI Conservatives	Lindsay Cumming	114
Turnout		4,510
Independent gain from DUP		

==== Omagh ====
Election results, shaded by plurality of First Preference Votes

Mid Tyrone
Party	Candidate	1st Pref
Sinn Féin	Patrick McMahon	1,216
UUP	Desmond Anderson	1,008
Sinn Féin	Barney McAleer	881
Sinn Féin	Sean Clarke	837
Ind. Nationalist	Brian McGrath	700
SDLP	Seamus Shields	614
DUP	Drew Baxter	501
SDLP	Nuala MacSherry	474
Democratic Left	Patrick McClean	340
SDLP	Patrick McLaughlin	339
DUP	Jim Patterson	313
UUP	William Oldcroft	288
Alliance	James Lagan	138
Turnout		7,877
DUP gain from UUP		

Omagh Town
Party	Candidate	1st Pref
DUP	Oliver Gibson	995
SDLP	Paddy McGowan	940
Independent	Johnny McLaughlin	921
UUP	Wilfred Breen	808
Sinn Féin	Francis Mackey	807
Alliance	Ann Gormley	503
SDLP	Joe Byrne	430
DUP	Ivan Burnside	390
SDLP	Stephen McKenna	314
Alliance	Ethne McClelland	275
UUP	Reuben McKelvey	271
Workers' Party	Hugh Mullin	54
Turnout		6,887
Johnny McLaughlin leaves SDLP		
Alliance gain from DUP		

West Tyrone
Party	Candidate	1st Pref
DUP	Thomas Buchanan	1,194
SDLP	Liam McQuaid	1,192
UUP	Arthur McFarland	1,143
Sinn Féin	Gerry McMenamin	896
Sinn Féin	Patrick Watters	701
UUP	George Rainey	611
SDLP	John Duffy	590
SDLP	James Connolly	493
Workers' Party	Tommy Owens	368
UUP	William Wilson	279
Alliance	Eric Bullick	176
Turnout		7,843
No change

==== Strabane ====
Election results, shaded by plurality of First Preference Votes

Derg
Party	Candidate	1st Pref
SDLP	Laurence McNamee	1,131
UUP	Edward Turner	1,075
Sinn Féin	Charles McHugh	993
DUP	Thomas Kerrigan	906
DUP	Samuel Allison	577
Ind. Unionist	Derek Hussey	551
Sinn Féin	John Elliott	386
Ind. Nationalist	Denis McCrory	49
Turnout		5,834
No change

Glenelly
Party	Candidate	1st Pref
SDLP	John Gallagher	968
UUP	James Emery	876
DUP	David Bresland	825
DUP	John Donnell	754
Sinn Féin	Patrick Kelly	465
UUP	Samuel Martin	435
Alliance	John Devine	367
DUP	Derek Reaney	299
SDLP	Bernard McDermott	237
Independent	Hughes Colhoun	39
Turnout		5,408
UUP gain from Alliance		

Mourne
Party	Candidate	1st Pref
Sinn Féin	Ivan Barr	1,229
UUP	John Cummings	963
SDLP	Mary McElroy	925
Ind. Nationalist	James O'Kane	837
SDLP	Thomas Mullen	753
SDLP	Paul O'Hare	589
Sinn Féin	Elayne McNicholl	488
Democratic Left	Francis McCay	136
Turnout		6,151
Seats increased from five to six; SDLP gain, Independent loss		
