= 2011 Larne Borough Council election =

Local government election in Northern Ireland

← 2005	5 May 2011	2014 →

All 15 seats to Larne Borough Council 8 seats needed for a majority
	First party	Second party	Third party
Party	DUP	UUP	Alliance
Seats won	4	3	3
Seat change	▼1	▼1	▲1
	Fourth party	Fifth party	Sixth party
Party	Independent	TUV	Sinn Féin
Seats won	2	1	1
Seat change	Steady	▲1	▲1
	Seventh party
Party	SDLP
Seats won	1
Seat change	▼1
- Party with the most votes by district.

Elections to Larne Borough Council were held on 5 May 2011 on the same day as the other Northern Irish local government elections. The election used three district electoral areas to elect a total of 15 councillors.

== Election results ==
Larne Borough Council Election Result 2011
Party	Seats	Gains	Losses	Net gain/loss	Seats %	Votes %	Votes	+/−
DUP	4	0	1	▼1	26.7	32.0	3,374	▼3.0
UUP	3	0	1	▼1	20.0	18.6	1,961	▼7.9
Alliance	3	1	0	▲1	20.0	15.0	1,576	▲2.6
Independent	2	1	1	Steady	13.3	9.3	983	▼2.3
TUV	1	1	0	▲1	6.7	7.4	784	New
Sinn Féin	1	1	0	▲1	6.7	7.3	766	▲3.5
SDLP	1	0	1	▼1	6.7	6.2	652	▼3.0
BNP	0	0	0	Steady	0.0	1.7	182	New
PUP	0	0	0	Steady	0.0	1.4	146	▲0.3
Green (NI)	0	0	0	Steady	0.0	1.0	110	▼0.6

Note: "Votes" are the first preference votes.

== Districts summary ==
Results of the Larne Borough Council election, 2011 by district
Ward	%	Cllrs	%	Cllrs	%	Cllrs	%	Cllrs	%	Cllrs	%	Cllrs	%	Cllrs	Total Cllrs
Ward	DUP		UUP		Alliance		TUV		Sinn Féin		SDLP		Others		Total Cllrs
Coast Road	24.2	1	17.2	1	10.3	1	3.2	0	18.5	1	9.9	0	16.7	1	5
Larne Lough	44.0	2	28.8	2	20.7	1	6.6	0	0.0	0	0.0	0	0.0	0	5
Larne Town	23.1	1	5.0	0	11.8	1	13.6	1	5.3	0	11.2	1	30.0	1	5
Total	32.0	4	18.6	3	15.0	3	7.4	1	7.3	1	6.2	1	13.5	2	15

== Districts results ==
=== Coast Road ===
2005: 2 x DUP, 1 x UUP, 1 x SDLP, 1 x Alliance
2011: 1 x DUP, 1 x Sinn Féin, 1 x UUP, 1 x Alliance, 1 x Independent
2005-2011 Change: Sinn Féin and Independent gain from SDLP and DUP

Coast Road - 5 seats
Party	Candidate	FPv%	Count						
Party	Candidate	FPv%	1	2	3	4	5	6	7
Sinn Féin	Oliver McMullan	18.53%	613						
Alliance	Gerardine Mulvenna*	10.28%	340	355.6	355.72	394.04	408.04	644.56	
DUP	Winston Fulton*	13.85%	458	458	474	507.12	550.12	556.36	
UUP	Maureen Morrow	8.92%	295	296.2	307.2	335.32	502.32	525.16	550.57
Independent	Brian Dunn*	10.61%	351	351.48	358.48	393.84	429.84	473.76	530.46
DUP	Gordon Lyons	10.40%	344	344.24	355.24	380.24	409.24	416.48	423.2
SDLP	Danny O'Connor*	9.92%	328	365.92	367.92	399.48	406.48		
UUP	Andrew Wilson	8.31%	275	275	289	312			
Green (NI)	Danny Donnelly	3.33%	110	114.32	116.32				
TUV	Kenneth Johnston	3.17%	105	105	121				
BNP	Steven Moore	2.69%	89	89.12					
Electorate: 6,832 Valid: 3,308 (48.42%) Spoilt: 54 Quota: 552 Turnout: 3,362 (49.21%)

=== Larne Lough ===
2005: 2 x DUP, 2 x UUP, 1 x Alliance
2011: 2 x DUP, 2 x UUP, 1 x Alliance
2005-2011 Change: No change

Larne Lough - 5 seats
Party	Candidate	FPv%	Count					
Party	Candidate	FPv%	1	2	3	4	5	6
DUP	Bobby McKee*	24.22%	1,048					
UUP	Roy Beggs*	21.19%	917					
DUP	Gregg McKeen*	11.25%	487	751.96				
Alliance	John Mathews*	14.49%	627	635.32	656.48	869.14		
UUP	Mark McKinty	7.58%	328	338.88	457.56	473.26	563.36	683.19
DUP	Sharon McKeen	8.48%	367	396.76	425.74	435.07	469.41	576.02
TUV	Sam McAllister	6.61%	286	292.72	312.27	318.73	340.83	
Alliance	Niamh Spurle	6.17%	267	270.2	275.26			
Electorate: 9,312 Valid: 4,327 (46.47%) Spoilt: 61 Quota: 722 Turnout: 4,388 (47.12%)

=== Larne Town ===
2005: 2 x Independent, 1 x DUP, 1 x SDLP, 1 x UUP
2011: 1 x DUP, 1 x TUV, 1 x Alliance, 1 x SDLP, 1 x Independent
2005-2011 Change: TUV and Alliance gain from UUP and Independent

Larne Town - 5 seats
Party	Candidate	FPv%	Count							
Party	Candidate	FPv%	1	2	3	4	5	6	7	8
TUV	Jack McKee*	13.56%	393	399	413	413	441	493		
Independent	Roy Craig*	13.00%	377	399	409	416	442	461	560	
Alliance	Michael Lynch	11.80%	342	356	359	381	397	404	444	481.81
DUP	Drew Niblock	12.11%	351	354	364	365	392	422	448	471.37
SDLP	Martin Wilson*	11.18%	324	331	332	432	434	439	452	456.94
DUP	Angela Smyth	11.00%	319	326	329	330	337	359	383	392.88
Independent	Mark Dunn*	6.07%	176	184	194	195	219	236		
PUP	Bill Adamson	5.04%	146	149	166	166	174			
UUP	Darin Ferguson	5.04%	146	149	163	164				
Sinn Féin	Sean Waide	5.28%	153	154	155					
BNP	Robert Bell	3.21%	93	93						
Independent	Andrew Swan	2.73%	79							
Electorate: 6,459 Valid: 2,899 (44.88%) Spoilt: 28 Quota: 484 Turnout: 2,927 (45.32%)
