= Ulster Constitution Party =

- Leader: Lindsay Mason
- Founded: 1971
- Dissolved: 1974
- Ideology: Unionism; Ulster Loyalism
- Political position: Far-right

The Ulster Constitution Party was a minor Unionist political party in Northern Ireland, active in the early 1970s.

== History ==
The party was established by two Belfast City Council councillors, David M. Riddelsdell and Robert Lindsay Mason. Mason was effective leader from the group's establishment in 1971 whilst Riddelsdell acted as party secretary. The party's two representatives lost their Council seats in the 1973 election when they ran as part of wider Ulster loyalist coalition groups. With no elected representatives the party effectively disappeared in 1974 when the National Front expanded its operations in Northern Ireland and Mason became a member.
