= Daphne Trimble =

Northern Irish academic and politician (b. 1953)

The Right Honourable The Lady Trimble
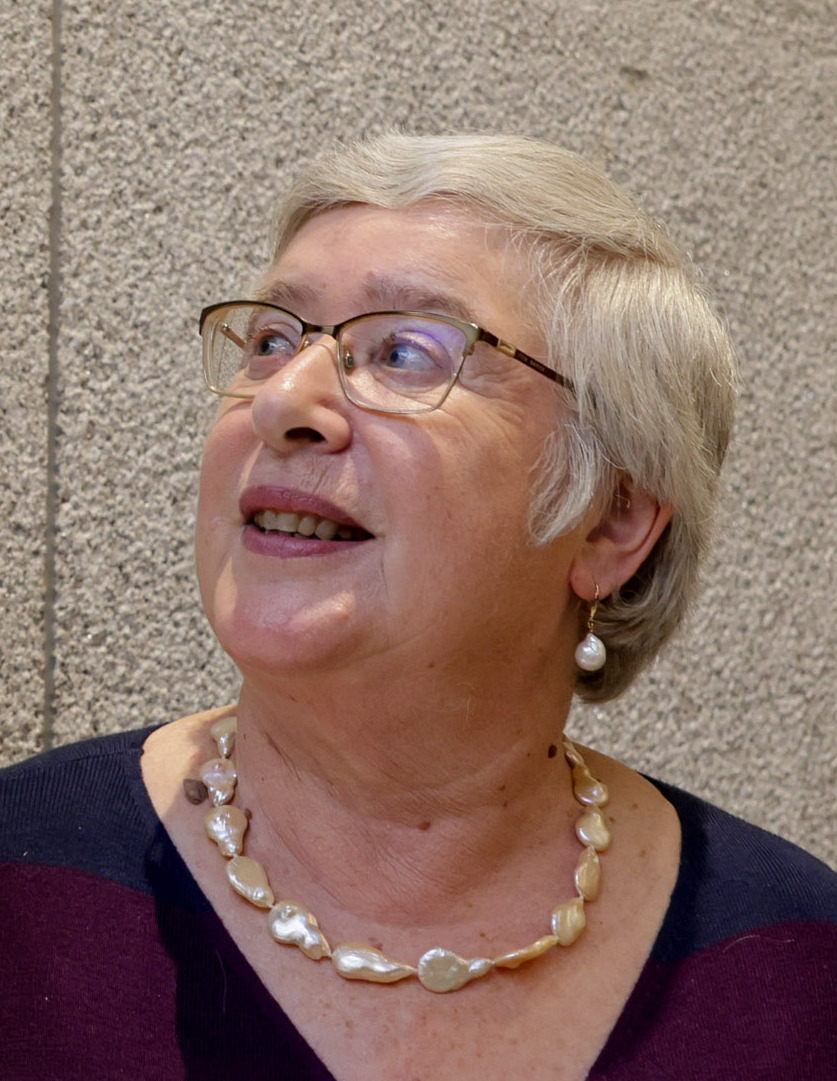
- Lady Trimble in 2023

Honorary President of the Ulster Unionist Party
- Incumbent
- Assumed office 13 March 2023
- Leader: Doug Beattie; Mike Nesbitt; Jon Burrows
- Preceded by: May Steele

Personal details
- Born: July 1953 (age 72) Northern Ireland
- Party: Ulster Unionist Party
- Other political affiliations: UCUNF (2010)
- Spouse: Lord Trimble (died 2022)

Daphne Elizabeth Trimble, Baroness Trimble (née Orr; born July 1953), is a Northern Irish academic and former unionist politician.

== Background ==
Having served as a member of the Equality Commission for Northern Ireland, she was appointed as a part-time Commissioner in the Northern Ireland Human Rights Commission (NIHRC) in 2008, and publicly opposed its proposals for a Bill of Rights for Northern Ireland.

She resigned from the NIHRC to contest the May 2010 UK general election, unsuccessfully, for the Ulster Conservatives and Unionists in the Lagan Valley constituency.

After graduating in law from Queen's University Belfast, she married her former lecturer David Trimble in August 1978, acquiring the title of Lady on his elevation in June 2006 to the House of Lords. They have two sons and two daughters (Richard, Victoria, Nicholas, and Sarah).

Daphne has also worked in schools across the Armagh area, such as Portadown College.

In August 2022, she endorsed Liz Truss for the leadership of the Conservative Party in that summer's leadership election.

In March 2023 she was appointed as the Honorary President of the Ulster Unionist Party.
