= Michael Cox (independent bishop) =

Bishop

Michael Patrick Cox, MA, OMD (born 1945 or 1946), is an Irish independent bishop. From Mitchelstown, County Cork, he is a well-known member of the Independent Catholic movement in Ireland and is also known for ordaining the singer Sinéad O'Connor. He is the founder and 'bishop superior' of the Irish Orthodox Catholic and Apostolic Church.

== Early life ==
Cox was an Irish soldier and a Dún Laoghaire harbour policeman.

== Ministry ==
Michael Patrick Cox was ordained to the priesthood in Switzerland on 1 May 1978 as part of Order Mater Dei by Bishops Maurice "Hermenegildo" Revaz (Bishop Superior at the time), William "Rufino" Daly, Richard "Sixto" Corr, James Boyle and Ciaran "Bernardo" Broadbery. This Order was founded by a group of former bishops of the Carmelites of the Holy Face who had left when this order, under Clemente Domínguez y Gómez, transformed into the Palmarian Catholic Church, with Clemente claiming he had been crowned Pope Gregory XVII of the Catholic Church by Jesus Christ. Their holy orders derive from Ngô Đình Thục.

He was then consecrated as a bishop in Dublin by Broadbery on 27 April 1982, and Cox subsequently appeared on The Late Late Show on RTÉ shortly afterwards. (Note: This 1978 date is contradicted by Joe Humphreys, on irishtimes.com, who wrote that Cox was consecrated a bishop in 1992.) (Note: In 2004, Cardinal Joseph Ratzinger, prefect of the Congregation for the Doctrine of the Faith (CDF), replied to Cardinal Cormac Murphy-O'Connor, archbishop of Westminster, about a request by Broadbery for declaration on the nullity of his ordination. Ratzinger wrote that the CDF decreed in the 1983 notification on "the illicit ordinations of El Palmar de Troya" and does not address "the particulars of individual ordinations". Ratzinger requested that Murphy-O'Connor communicate a prescript to Broadbery from the 1983 notification. The CDF prescript "as regards those who have already received ordination in this illicit manner, or who will perhaps receive ordination from them, whatever about the validity of the orders, the Church does not nor shall it recognize their ordination, and as regards all juridical effects, it considers them in the state which each one had previously, and the above-mentioned penal sanctions remain in force until repentance.")

Broadbery was consecrated in 1977 by Clemente Domínguez y Gómez of the Carmelites of the Holy Face (which would later become the Palmarian Catholic Church), who in turn was consecrated by Archbishop Ngô Đình Thục. In September 1976, Thục, and those he had ordained, were excommunicated from the Catholic Church.

Cox offered Tridentine Masses at Monkstown, Dublin, in the mid-1980s.

Cox's church is St Colman's, in the townland of Cree near Birr, County Offaly. (Note: Cox's church is a former Church of Ireland church building at 53.0627°N 7.8608°W.)

In May 1998, Cox consecrated a Catholic priest, Pat Buckley, as a bishop. In June 1998, Jim Cantwell, director of the Irish Catholic Press and Information Office, said that Cox's consecration of Buckley was valid but illicit. However, the Catholic Media Office of the Catholic Bishops' Conference of England and Wales later "said that it doubts that the bishop's episcopal consecration is valid".

In April 1999, Cox ordained female rock singer Sinéad O'Connor as a priest. Her ordination ceremony, after six weeks of theological study, was held in a Lourdes hotel bedroom. O'Connor then assumed the religious name of "Mother Bernadette Mary". This action is not considered valid within the Catholic church

At 'The Sacred Council' held at St Colman's Church in the townland of Cree near Birr, Co Offaly, 21–23 April 2000, Cox was elected 'Archbishop-Patriarch' of OMD for life and to hold a veto over the whole order of OMD.

In 2001, Cox planned to convert his 75-foot (23 m) commercial fishing trawler, called The Little Bishop, into "a mobile floating church, offering on-board marriages and baptisms to people around the British Isles." Cox planned to protest against the ship being sailed into Ireland by the pro-choice feminist group Women on Waves. In 2004, Cox's 84-foot (26 m) trawler, called The Patriarch, caught fire while underway and sank.

In 2011, Cox was a candidate in the general election for the Laois–Offaly constituency, coming last with 60 votes. In 2013, a District Court judge requested that the Garda Síochána investigate a marriage conducted by Cox for a 17-year-old Traveller youth and his partner. Civil marriages in Ireland require that the participants are over 18, or have a Court Exemption Order if this is not the case. Cox states that such weddings conducted by him are religious, not civil, so there is no religious reason why somebody 16 years old should not get married.

I recognise their [Traveller] customs and appreciate them. Anyone who asks why I do what I do- I tell them that I make it clear the wedding ceremony is purely religious. I do not register marriage with the state.

— Michael Cox

Cox insists on parental consent and parents being present at the ceremony.
