= Larne Town (District Electoral Area) =

District electoral areas in Larne, Northern Ireland

Larne Town DEA (1993-2014) within Larne

Larne Town was one of the three district electoral areas in Larne, Northern Ireland which existed from 1985 to 2014. The district elected five members to Larne Borough Council, and formed part of the East Antrim constituencies for the Northern Ireland Assembly and UK Parliament.

It was created for the 1985 local elections, replacing most of Larne Area C which had existed since 1973, and contained the wards of Blackcave, Central, Gardenmore, Harbour and Town Parks. It was abolished for the 2014 local elections and most of the area was transferred to the Coast Road DEA, with some also moving to the Larne Lough DEA.

== Councillors ==
| Election | Councillor (party) | Councillor (party) | Councillor (party) | Councillor (party) | Councillor (party) |
|---|---|---|---|---|---|
| 2011 | Roy Craig (Independent) | Michael Lynch (Alliance) | Martin Wilson (SDLP) | Drew Niblock (DUP) | Jack McKee (TUV)/ (DUP) |
| 2005 | Roy Craig (Independent) | Lindsay Mason (Independent) | Martin Wilson (SDLP) | Mark Dunn (UUP) | Jack McKee (TUV)/ (DUP) |
| 2001 | Roy Craig (Independent) | Lindsay Mason (Independent) | Martin Wilson (SDLP) | Brian Dunn (UUP) | Jack McKee (TUV)/ (DUP) |
| 1997 | Roy Craig (Independent) | Lindsay Mason (Independent) | John Nixon (Independent) | Rosalie Armstrong (UUP) | Jack McKee (TUV)/ (DUP) |
| 1993 | Patricia Kay (Alliance) | Lindsay Mason (Independent) | Robert Robinson (UUP) | Rosalie Armstrong (UUP) | Jack McKee (TUV)/ (DUP) |
| 1989 | Patricia Kay (Alliance) | Pat Buckley (Independent) | Robert Robinson (UUP) | Rosalie Armstrong (UUP) | Jack McKee (TUV)/ (DUP) |
| 1985 | Liam Kelly (Alliance) | Leonard Sluman (DUP) | Robert Robinson (UUP) | Rosalie Armstrong (UUP) | Jack McKee (TUV)/ (DUP) |

== 2011 election ==
2005: 2 x Independent, 1 x DUP, 1 x SDLP, 1 x UUP

2011: 1 x DUP, 1 x TUV, 1 x Alliance, 1 x SDLP, 1 x Independent

2005-2011 change: TUV and Alliance gain from UUP and Independent

Larne Town - 5 seats
| Party | Candidate | FPv% | Count | | | | | | | |
| Party | Candidate | FPv% | 1 | 2 | 3 | 4 | 5 | 6 | 7 | 8 |
|---|---|---|---|---|---|---|---|---|---|---|
| TUV | Jack McKee* | 13.56% | 393 | 399 | 413 | 413 | 441 | 493 | | |
| Independent | Roy Craig* | 13.00% | 377 | 399 | 409 | 416 | 442 | 461 | 560 | |
| Alliance | Michael Lynch | 11.80% | 342 | 356 | 359 | 381 | 397 | 404 | 444 | 481.81 |
| DUP | Drew Niblock | 12.11% | 351 | 354 | 364 | 365 | 392 | 422 | 448 | 471.37 |
| SDLP | Martin Wilson* | 11.18% | 324 | 331 | 332 | 432 | 434 | 439 | 452 | 456.94 |
| DUP | Angela Smyth | 11.00% | 319 | 326 | 329 | 330 | 337 | 359 | 383 | 392.88 |
| Independent | Mark Dunn* | 6.07% | 176 | 184 | 194 | 195 | 219 | 236 | | |
| PUP | Bill Adamson | 5.04% | 146 | 149 | 166 | 166 | 174 | | | |
| UUP | Darin Ferguson | 5.04% | 146 | 149 | 163 | 164 | | | | |
| Sinn Féin | Sean Waide | 5.28% | 153 | 154 | 155 | | | | | |
| BNP | Robert Bell | 3.21% | 93 | 93 | | | | | | |
| Independent | Andrew Swan | 2.73% | 79 | | | | | | | |
Electorate: 6,459 Valid: 2,899 (44.88%) Spoilt: 28 Quota: 484 Turnout: 2,927 (45.32%)

== 2005 election ==
2001: 2 x Independent, 1 x DUP, 1 x SDLP, 1 x UUP

2005: 2 x Independent, 1 x DUP, 1 x SDLP, 1 x UUP

2001-2005 change: No change

Larne Town - 5 seats
| Party | Candidate | FPv% | Count | | | | | | | | | | |
| Party | Candidate | FPv% | 1 | 2 | 3 | 4 | 5 | 6 | 7 | 8 | 9 | 10 | 11 |
|---|---|---|---|---|---|---|---|---|---|---|---|---|---|
| DUP | Jack McKee* | 27.02% | 939 | | | | | | | | | | |
| SDLP | Martin Wilson* | 14.71% | 511 | 512.52 | 515.9 | 521.9 | 524.28 | 526.28 | 603.28 | | | | |
| Independent | Roy Craig* | 12.52% | 435 | 448.3 | 450.3 | 458.3 | 473.44 | 485.2 | 492.2 | 517.24 | 571.62 | 668.62 | |
| Independent | Lindsay Mason* | 7.02% | 244 | 253.12 | 261.12 | 267.12 | 277.12 | 279.88 | 299.88 | 313.02 | 357.02 | 502.3 | 550.3 |
| UUP | Mark Dunn | 8.83% | 307 | 327.52 | 329.52 | 334.52 | 343.9 | 423.42 | 431.42 | 463.18 | 494.94 | 525.32 | 549.32 |
| DUP | Sharon McKeen | 3.28% | 114 | 393.3 | 395.3 | 400.3 | 404.68 | 413.96 | 414.96 | 469.8 | 477.18 | 495.46 | 501.46 |
| Independent | John Anderson | 7.08% | 246 | 251.32 | 262.32 | 270.32 | 275.32 | 278.08 | 282.08 | 285.08 | 324.08 | | |
| Alliance | Elena Aceves-Cully | 5.04% | 175 | 176.52 | 185.52 | 187.52 | 191.52 | 193.52 | 197.52 | 199.52 | | | |
| PUP | Bill Adamson | 3.77% | 131 | 142.78 | 143.78 | 146.78 | 147.78 | 150.54 | 152.54 | | | | |
| Independent | Robert Shaw | 3.51% | 122 | 122 | 126 | 126 | 128 | 129 | | | | | |
| UUP | Maxi Burns | 2.91% | 101 | 107.46 | 107.46 | 109.6 | 116.36 | | | | | | |
| Independent | Thomas Robinson | 1.64% | 57 | 61.18 | 62.18 | 64.18 | | | | | | | |
| Independent | David Todd | 1.35% | 47 | 48.14 | 50.14 | | | | | | | | |
| Green (NI) | Mary Ringland | 1.32% | 46 | 46.38 | | | | | | | | | |
Electorate: 6,447 Valid: 3,475 (53.90%) Spoilt: 60 Quota: 580 Turnout: 3,535 (54.83%)

== 2001 election ==
1997: 2 x Independent, 1 x DUP, 1 x UUP, 1 x Independent Unionist

2001: 2 x Independent, 1 x DUP, 1 x UUP, 1 x SDLP

1997-2001 change: SDLP gain from Independent, Independent Unionist becomes Independent

Larne Town - 5 seats
| Party | Candidate | FPv% | Count | | | | | | | | | |
| Party | Candidate | FPv% | 1 | 2 | 3 | 4 | 5 | 6 | 7 | 8 | 9 | 10 |
|---|---|---|---|---|---|---|---|---|---|---|---|---|
| UUP | Brian Dunn | 18.13% | 804 | | | | | | | | | |
| DUP | Jack McKee* | 17.50% | 776 | | | | | | | | | |
| SDLP | Martin Wilson | 12.85% | 570 | 571.12 | 572.12 | 572.12 | 703.12 | 703.16 | 762.16 | | | |
| Independent | Roy Craig* | 8.80% | 390 | 397.2 | 411.36 | 412.56 | 416.64 | 438.08 | 487.96 | 495.16 | 567.61 | 698.73 |
| Independent | Lindsay Mason* | 8.77% | 389 | 393.96 | 405.12 | 406.12 | 434.28 | 465.56 | 513.88 | 520.18 | 570.68 | 690.64 |
| Independent | William Adams | 7.37% | 327 | 332.28 | 349.84 | 350.96 | 352.96 | 370.28 | 403.56 | 405.36 | 458.04 | 541.41 |
| Independent | John Anderson | 6.58% | 292 | 293.6 | 294.76 | 295.2 | 297.2 | 301.04 | 326.04 | 330.09 | 360.89 | |
| UUP | Andrew Wilson | 4.17% | 185 | 217.48 | 233.8 | 235.72 | 237.76 | 299.68 | 319.16 | 321.86 | | |
| Alliance | Margaret Richmond | 5.39% | 239 | 241.4 | 242.48 | 242.56 | 257.64 | 258.92 | | | | |
| DUP | Alastair Holden | 3.72% | 165 | 169.48 | 194.72 | 218.52 | 218.52 | | | | | |
| Sinn Féin | Janette Graffin | 4.31% | 191 | 191.32 | 191.32 | 191.36 | | | | | | |
| PUP | Bill Adamson | 2.41% | 107 | 109 | | | | | | | | |
Electorate: 7,483 Valid: 4,435 (59.27%) Spoilt: 89 Quota: 740 Turnout: 4,524 (60.46%)

== 1997 election ==
1993: 2 x UUP, 1 x UUP, 1 x Alliance, 1 x Independent Unionist

1997: 2 x Independent, 1 x DUP, 1 x UUP, 1 x Independent Unionist

1993-1997 change: Independent (two seats) gain from UUP and Alliance

Larne Town - 5 seats
| Party | Candidate | FPv% | Count | | | | |
| Party | Candidate | FPv% | 1 | 2 | 3 | 4 | 5 |
|---|---|---|---|---|---|---|---|
| Independent | John Nixon | 21.22% | 698 | | | | |
| DUP | Jack McKee* | 20.16% | 663 | | | | |
| UUP | Rosalie Armstrong* | 14.75% | 485 | 500.18 | 531.72 | 670.72 | |
| Independent | Roy Craig | 10.70% | 352 | 413.38 | 426.04 | 468.42 | 525.42 |
| Ind. Unionist | Lindsay Mason* | 14.05% | 462 | 488.4 | 496.62 | 508.94 | 517.94 |
| Alliance | Patricia Kay* | 10.22% | 336 | 364.38 | 364.82 | 375.8 | 394.8 |
| UUP | May Steele | 6.14% | 202 | 213.88 | 236.54 | | |
| DUP | Gregg McKeen | 2.77% | 91 | 95.62 | | | |
Electorate: 7,785 Valid: 3,289 (42.25%) Spoilt: 59 Quota: 549 Turnout: 3,348 (43.01%)

== 1993 election ==
1989: 2 x UUP, 1 x DUP, 1 x Alliance, 1 x Independent

1993: 2 x UUP, 1 x DUP, 1 x Alliance, 1 x Independent Unionist

1989-1993 change: Independent Unionist gain from Independent

Larne Town - 5 seats
| Party | Candidate | FPv% | Count | | | | | |
| Party | Candidate | FPv% | 1 | 2 | 3 | 4 | 5 | 6 |
|---|---|---|---|---|---|---|---|---|
| DUP | Jack McKee* | 25.76% | 851 | | | | | |
| UUP | Rosalie Armstrong* | 17.59% | 581 | | | | | |
| UUP | Robert Robinson* | 12.66% | 418 | 466.65 | 518.45 | 541.1 | 548.2 | 583.2 |
| Alliance | Patricia Kay* | 12.41% | 410 | 413.15 | 417.15 | 418.3 | 546.3 | 553.6 |
| Ind. Unionist | Lindsay Mason | 10.26% | 339 | 350.55 | 352.55 | 353.5 | 436.5 | 468.25 |
| Independent | Roy Craig | 8.39% | 277 | 286.45 | 292.45 | 294.45 | 326.5 | 363.75 |
| DUP | Leonard Sluman | 2.48% | 82 | 289.55 | 294 | 294.55 | 297.9 | |
| Independent | Pat Buckley* | 8.30% | 274 | 274.35 | 275.35 | 275.5 | | |
| UUP | May Steele | 2.15% | 71 | 79.05 | | | | |
Electorate: 7,773 Valid: 3,303 (42.29%) Spoilt: 85 Quota: 551 Turnout: 3,388 (43.59%)

== 1989 election ==
1985: 2 x UUP, 2 x DUP, 1 x Alliance

1989: 2 x UUP, 1 x DUP, 1 x Alliance, 1 x Independent

1985-1989 change: Independent gain from DUP

Larne Town - 5 seats
| Party | Candidate | FPv% | Count | | | | |
| Party | Candidate | FPv% | 1 | 2 | 3 | 4 | 5 |
|---|---|---|---|---|---|---|---|
| DUP | Jack McKee* | 25.76% | 979 | | | | |
| Independent | Pat Buckley | 23.63% | 855 | | | | |
| UUP | Robert Robinson* | 16.03% | 580 | 630.31 | | | |
| UUP | Rosalie Armstrong* | 14.95% | 541 | 576.1 | 595.18 | 606.34 | |
| Alliance | Patricia Kay | 6.30% | 228 | 229.95 | 333.63 | 487.55 | 615.21 |
| DUP | Leonard Sluman* | 2.35% | 85 | 362.29 | 365.17 | 365.92 | 418.13 |
| Independent | Roy Craig | 5.94% | 215 | 223.97 | 280.85 | 301.85 | |
| Alliance | William Geddis | 3.76% | 136 | 136.39 | 202.27 | | |
Electorate: 7,298 Valid: 3,619 (49.59%) Spoilt: 91 Quota: 604 Turnout: 3,710 (50.84%)

== 1985 election ==
1985: 2 x UUP, 2 x DUP, 1 x Alliance

Larne Town - 5 seats
| Party | Candidate | FPv% | Count | | |
| Party | Candidate | FPv% | 1 | 2 | 3 |
|---|---|---|---|---|---|
| DUP | Jack McKee* | 37.41% | 1,375 | | |
| Alliance | Liam Kelly* | 26.31% | 967 | | |
| UUP | Robert Robinson* | 20.92% | 769 | | |
| DUP | Leonard Sluman* | 2.35% | 94 | 671.36 | |
| UUP | Rosalie Armstrong* | 9.36% | 344 | 402.24 | 670.91 |
| UUP | Thomas Lamrock | 2.31% | 85 | 111.32 | 185.69 |
| DUP | Frederick Hoey | 1.14% | 42 | 134.4 | 143.11 |
Electorate: 7,289 Valid: 3,676 (50.43%) Spoilt: 87 Quota: 613 Turnout: 3,763 (51.63%)
