= Larne Lough (District Electoral Area) =

District electoral area in Northern Ireland

- Mid and East Antrim Borough Council DEA constituency

Current constituency
- Created: 1985
- Seats: 5 (1985-)
- Councillors: Roy Beggs Jr (UUP); Maeve Donnelly (APNI); Robert Logan (APNI); Gregg McKeen (DUP); Paul Reid (DUP)

Larne Lough DEA within Mid and East Antrim

Larne Lough DEA (1993-2014) within Larne

Larne Lough is one of the seven district electoral areas (DEA) in Mid and East Antrim, Northern Ireland. The district elects five members to Mid and East Antrim District Council and contains the wards of Ballycarry and Glynn, Curran and Inver, Islandmagee, Kilwaughter and Whitehead South. Larne Lough forms part of the East Antrim constituencies for the Northern Ireland Assembly and UK Parliament.

It was created for the 1985 local elections, replacing Larne Area B and part of Larne Area C which had existed since 1973, where it originally contained five wards (Antiville, Ballycarry, Glynn, Island Magee and Kilwaughter). For the 2014 local elections it gained parts of Larne from the abolished Larne Town DEA, and Whitehead from the abolished Kilroot DEA.

== Councillors ==
Election	Councillor (party)	Councillor (party)	Councillor (party)	Councillor (party)	Councillor (party)
2023	Robert Logan (Alliance)	Maeve Donnelly (Alliance)	Roy Beggs Jr (UUP)	Gregg McKeen (DUP)	Paul Reid (DUP)
May 2022 co-option	Robert Logan (Alliance)	Maeve Donnelly (Alliance)	Keith Turner (UUP)	Gregg McKeen (DUP)	Paul Reid (DUP)
August 2019 co-option	Robert Logan (Alliance)	Danny Donnelly (Alliance)	Keith Turner (UUP)	Gregg McKeen (DUP)	Paul Reid (DUP)
2019	Robert Logan (Alliance)	Danny Donnelly (Alliance)	Mark McKinty (UUP)	Gregg McKeen (DUP)	Paul Reid (DUP)
2014	Robert Logan (Alliance)	Andrew Wilson (UUP)	Mark McKinty (UUP)	Gregg McKeen (DUP)	Paul Reid (DUP)
2011	John Mathews (Alliance)	Roy Beggs (UUP)	Mark McKinty (UUP)	Gregg McKeen (DUP)	Bobby McKee (DUP)
2005	John Mathews (Alliance)	Roy Beggs (UUP)	Andrew Wilson (UUP)	Gregg McKeen (DUP)	Bobby McKee (DUP)
2001	John Mathews (Alliance)	Roy Beggs (UUP)	David Fleck (UUP)	Gregg McKeen (DUP)	Bobby McKee (DUP)
1997	John Mathews (Alliance)	Roy Beggs (UUP)	David Fleck (UUP)	John Hall (UUP)	Bobby McKee (DUP)
1993	Samuel McAllister (DUP)	Roy Beggs (UUP)	Thomas Caldwell (UUP)	Alexander Hunter (UUP)	Bobby McKee (DUP)
1989	Gary Haggan (DUP)	Roy Beggs (UUP)	Samuel Steele (UUP)	Thomas Baxter (UUP)	Bobby McKee (DUP)
1985	Samuel McAllister (DUP)	Roy Beggs (UUP)	Samuel Steele (UUP)	Laurence Niblock (UUP)	John Alexander (DUP)

== 2023 election ==
2019: 2 x DUP, 2 x Alliance, 1 x UUP

2023: 2 x Alliance, 2 x DUP, 1 x UUP

2019–2023 change: No change

Larne Lough - 5 seats
Party	Candidate	FPv%	Count					
Party	Candidate	FPv%	1	2	3	4	5	6
Alliance	Maeve Donnelly*	21.69%	1,389					
DUP	Gregg McKeen*	18.69%	1,197					
UUP	Roy Beggs Jr	17.78%	1,139					
Alliance	Robert Logan*	10.87%	696	996.15	1,165.15			
DUP	Paul Reid*	13.46%	862	864.53	867.76	972.26	975.26	1,224.26
UUP	James Carson	7.49%	480	485.06	500.90	506.70	563.70	692.70
TUV	Ronnie Donnell	6.67%	427	427.23	433.69	441.69	444.69	
Green (NI)	Philip Randle	3.36%	215	223.51				
Electorate: 13,744 Valid: 6,405 (46.60%) Spoilt: 108 Quota: 1,068 Turnout: 6,513 (47.39%)

== 2019 election ==
2014: 2 x DUP, 2 x UUP, 1 x Alliance

2019: 2 x DUP, 2 x Alliance, 1 x UUP

2014-2019 change: Alliance gain from UUP

Larne Lough - 5 seats
Party	Candidate	FPv%	Count					
Party	Candidate	FPv%	1	2	3	4	5	6
DUP	Gregg McKeen*	19.48%	1,166					
Alliance	Danny Donnelly †	17.66%	1,057					
UUP	Mark McKinty* †	16.42%	983	995.88	1,025.88			
DUP	Paul Reid*	13.46%	806	939.98	950.12	1,133.12		
Alliance	Robert Logan*	12.01%	719	720.82	890.82	909.1	912.1	961.75
UUP	Andrew Wilson*	9.42%	564	570.3	581.58	782.9	914.9	916.2
TUV	James Strange	7.27%	435	441.72	453.86			
Green (NI)	Robert Robinson	4.28%	256	256.56				
Electorate: 13,129 Valid: 5,986 (45.59%) Spoilt: 100 Quota: 998 Turnout: 6,086 (46.36%)

== 2014 election ==
2011: 2 x DUP, 2 x UUP, 1 x Alliance

2014: 2 x UUP, 2 x DUP, 1 x Alliance

2011-2014 change: No change

Larne Lough - 5 seats
Party	Candidate	FPv%	Count						
Party	Candidate	FPv%	1	2	3	4	5	6	7
DUP	Gregg McKeen*	16.99%	966						
UUP	Mark McKinty*	16.31%	927	928	966				
Alliance	Robert Logan	10.23%	583	619	622	903	903.05	1,200.05	
UUP	Andrew Wilson	14.71%	836	836	855	879	881.94	960.94	
DUP	Paul Reid	7.93%	457	457	700	710	715.71	773.71	805.71
TUV	Kenneth Johnston	10.67%	606	606	615	621	621.51	657.53	678.53
NI21	Jeremy Jones	10.06%	572	583	586	611	611.08		
Alliance	Michael Lynch*	5.33%	303	366	372				
DUP	Matthew Scott	5.40%	307	307					
Sinn Féin	Seán Waide	2.25%	128						
Electorate: 12,826 Valid: 5,685 (44.32%) Spoilt: 72 Quota: 948 Turnout: 5,757 (44.89%)

== 2011 election ==
2005: 2 x DUP, 2 x UUP, 1 x Alliance

2011: 2 x DUP, 2 x UUP, 1 x Alliance

2005-2011 change: No change

Larne Lough - 5 seats
Party	Candidate	FPv%	Count					
Party	Candidate	FPv%	1	2	3	4	5	6
DUP	Bobby McKee*	24.22%	1,048					
UUP	Roy Beggs*	21.19%	917					
DUP	Gregg McKeen*	11.25%	487	751.96				
Alliance	John Mathews*	14.49%	627	635.32	656.48	869.14		
UUP	Mark McKinty	7.58%	328	338.88	457.56	473.26	563.36	683.19
DUP	Sharon McKeen	8.48%	367	396.76	425.74	435.07	469.41	576.02
TUV	Sam McAllister	6.61%	286	292.72	312.27	318.73	340.83	
Alliance	Niamh Spurle	6.17%	267	270.2	275.26			
Electorate: 9,312 Valid: 4,327 (46.47%) Spoilt: 61 Quota: 722 Turnout: 4,388 (47.12%)

== 2005 election ==
2001: 2 x DUP, 2 x UUP, 1 x Alliance

2005: 2 x DUP, 2 x UUP, 1 x Alliance

2001-2005 change: No change

Larne Lough - 5 seats
Party	Candidate	FPv%	Count		
Party	Candidate	FPv%	1	2	3
DUP	Bobby McKee*	34.79%	1,589		
UUP	Roy Beggs*	20.39%	931		
Alliance	John Mathews*	18.87%	862		
DUP	Gregg McKeen*	9.15%	418	1,195.51	
UUP	Andrew Wilson	12.81%	585	619.45	916.25
UUP	Jonathan Moore	3.99%	182	194.19	315.03
Electorate: 8,574 Valid: 4,567 (53.27%) Spoilt: 91 Quota: 762 Turnout: 4,658 (54.33%)

== 2001 election ==
1997: 3 x UUP, 1 x DUP, 1 x Alliance

2001: 2 x DUP, 2 x UUP, 1 x Alliance

1997-2001 change: DUP gain from UUP

Larne Lough - 5 seats
Party	Candidate	FPv%	Count				
Party	Candidate	FPv%	1	2	3	4	5
DUP	Bobby McKee*	25.87%	1,314				
UUP	Roy Beggs*	24.57%	1,248				
Alliance	John Mathews*	23.06%	1,171				
DUP	Gregg McKeen	9.69%	492	914.17			
UUP	David Fleck*	7.36%	374	395.83	704.35	821.2	849.2
UUP	John Hall*	6.48%	329	342.69	424.77	551.46	615.97
Independent	William Small	2.97%	151	155.07	162.27	240.58	
Electorate: 8,552 Valid: 5,079 (59.39%) Spoilt: 154 Quota: 847 Turnout: 5,233 (61.19%)

== 1997 election ==
1993: 3 x UUP, 2 x DUP

1997: 3 x DUP, 1 x UUP, 1 x Alliance

1993-1997 change: Alliance gain from DUP

Larne Lough - 5 seats
Party	Candidate	FPv%	Count				
Party	Candidate	FPv%	1	2	3	4	5
UUP	Roy Beggs*	31.32%	1,043				
UUP	David Fleck	7.96%	265	480.73	527.83	655.83	
Alliance	John Mathews	15.80%	526	536.81	554.22	566.22	
UUP	John Hall	8.92%	297	344	362.76	488.79	576.09
DUP	Bobby McKee*	11.08%	369	405.19	497.77	521.76	523.56
DUP	Samuel McAllister*	9.01%	300	330.55	440.19	480	489.9
UUP	Alexander Hunter*	7.21%	240	339.17	358.34		
DUP	Sharon Gardiner	5.23%	174	197.03			
PUP	George Ferguson	3.48%	116	133.39			
Electorate: 7,838 Valid: 3,330 (42.49%) Spoilt: 95 Quota: 556 Turnout: 3,425 (43.70%)

== 1993 election ==
1989: 3 x UUP, 2 x DUP

1993: 3 x DUP, 2 x UUP

1989-1993 change: No change

Larne Lough - 5 seats
Party	Candidate	FPv%	Count				
Party	Candidate	FPv%	1	2	3	4	5
UUP	Roy Beggs*	51.82%	1,680				
UUP	Thomas Caldwell	5.31%	172	695.98			
DUP	Bobby McKee*	15.79%	512	607.14			
UUP	Alexander Hunter	3.73%	121	371.63	472.83	534.05	553.37
DUP	Samuel McAllister	11.38%	369	430.77	440.23	482.48	508.7
UUP	Samuel Steele*	5.31%	172	337.43	362.95	431.74	451.75
NI Conservatives	Gary Haggan*	6.66%	216	255.05	269.57		
Electorate: 7,406 Valid: 3,242 (43.78%) Spoilt: 141 Quota: 541 Turnout: 3,383 (45.68%)

== 1989 election ==
1985: 3 x UUP, 2 x DUP

1989: 3 x DUP, 2 x UUP

1985-1989 change: No change

Larne Lough - 5 seats
Party	Candidate	FPv%	Count				
Party	Candidate	FPv%	1	2	3	4	5
UUP	Roy Beggs*	38.94%	1,387				
UUP	Thomas Baxter*	13.81%	492	927.58			
UUP	Samuel Steele*	8.31%	296	473.48	725.03		
DUP	Bobby McKee	13.73%	489	560.34	592.74	633.24	
DUP	Gary Haggan	6.85%	244	294.46	320.56	365.11	569.16
Alliance	Thomas Caldwell	11.54%	411	435.94	449.44	472.39	496.83
DUP	William Sloan	6.82%	243	267.36	273.66	295.26	
Electorate: 7,198 Valid: 3,562 (49.49%) Spoilt: 116 Quota: 594 Turnout: 3,678 (51.10%)

== 1985 election ==
1985: 3 x UUP, 2 x DUP

Larne Lough - 5 seats
Party	Candidate	FPv%	Count			
Party	Candidate	FPv%	1	2	3	4
UUP	Roy Beggs*	27.69%	1,020			
DUP	John Alexander*	18.41%	678			
UUP	Laurence Niblock*	12.92%	476	596.4	597.48	703.48
UUP	Thomas Baxter	9.42%	347	547.8	553.47	657.47
DUP	Samuel McAllister*	13.33%	491	522.6	547.44	567.73
DUP	Gary Haggan	8.69%	320	351.2	379.73	389.22
Alliance	Thomas Benson*	9.53%	351	371.8	372.16	
Electorate: 6,568 Valid: 3,683 (56.07%) Spoilt: 96 Quota: 614 Turnout: 3,779 (57.54%)
