= May Steele =

Northern Irish politician (1936/1937 – 2020)

May Steele MBE JP

President of the Ulster Unionist Party
- In office 2016 – 8 January 2020
- Leader: Mike Nesbitt; Robin Swann; Steve Aiken
- Succeeded by: Daphne Trimble

Member of the Northern Ireland Forum
- In office 30 May 1996 – 25 April 1998
- Preceded by: Forum created
- Succeeded by: Forum dissolved
- Constituency: East Antrim

Personal details
- Born: 1936 or 1937 Larne, County Antrim, Northern Ireland
- Died: 8 January 2020
- Party: Ulster Unionist Party

May Steele (1936 or 1937 – 8 January 2020) was a Northern Irish Ulster Unionist Party (UUP) politician who was Party President from 2016 to 2020, and a Member of the Northern Ireland Forum for East Antrim from 1996 to 1998.

== Background ==
Living in Larne, Steele joined the Ulster Unionist Party (UUP) in the 1950s, and became active in County Antrim. She was close to Vanguard Unionist Progressive Party leader William Craig, but remained a member of the UUP.

In 1990 Steele was appointed as a Justice of the Peace (JP) for County Antrim.

At the 1993 Northern Ireland local elections and 1997, Steele stood unsuccessfully for the UUP on Larne Borough Council. She also stood in the Northern Ireland Forum election in East Antrim and was elected, although she lost her seat at the 1998 Northern Ireland Assembly election. Despite this loss, and a reputation as a hardliner, she remained a prominent supporter of party leader David Trimble, and called for support of the Good Friday Agreement.

Steele devoted much of her time to the Ulster Women's Unionist Council, becoming chairman of the organisation. In the 2000 Birthday Honours, she received the MBE for political and public service.

At the 2016 UUP annual conference, the party leader Mike Nesbit made Steele honorary president of the party.

Steele died on 8 January 2020, at the age of 83.

Northern Ireland Forum
New forum	Member for East Antrim; 1996–1998	Forum dissolved
Party political offices
Vacant Office merged with that of Chairman Title last held by Robert John White as President of the Ulster Unionist Party	Honorary President of the Ulster Unionist Party; 2016–2020	Vacant Title next held by Daphne Trimble
