= Pat Buckley (priest) =

Irish independent Catholic bishop (1952–2024)

Member of Larne Borough Council
- In office 17 May 1989 – 19 May 1993
- Preceded by: Leonard Sluman
- Succeeded by: Lindsay Mason
- Constituency: Larne Town

Personal details
- Born: 2 May 1952 Tullamore, County Offaly, Ireland
- Died: 17 May 2024 (aged 72)
- Party: Independent

Pat Buckley (2 May 1952 – 17 May 2024) was an Irish independent Catholic bishop and former Catholic priest who was excommunicated from the Church. As a Catholic priest, he ministered to Provisional Irish Republican Army prisoners during the 1981 Irish hunger strike, including their leader, Bobby Sands.

His ordination to the episcopate by Bishop Michael Cox resulted in his being excommunicated from the Catholic Church. He subsequently officiated at the marriages of divorcees who wished to remarry but were prevented from doing so under Catholic canon law. In 2013, he received a suspended sentence under Northern Irish law for officiating at sham marriages being used to circumvent immigration policies. Buckley also served as a local councillor on Larne Borough Council.

== Early life ==
Buckley was born on 2 May 1952 in Tullamore, County Offaly, Ireland. He was the eldest of 17 children, six of whom died in infancy. His father was a trade union official who later became a barrister and his socialist views influenced his son Pat. Buckley said that he decided that he wanted to become a priest at the age of three.

== Priesthood ==
Buckley studied for the priesthood in Clonliffe College, Dublin, and then in St. John's College, Waterford, and was ordained there in 1976. He later gained a master's degree in politics and social anthropology from Queen's University Belfast.

His first posting was in St Peter's in the Lower Falls area of West Belfast. Buckley claimed that clashes with his fellow clergy were due to his belief that the quality of the priests' accommodation was much higher than properties in the poverty-stricken area in which it was located.

During the 1981 Irish hunger strike, Buckley celebrated Mass in the Maze prison. During this time he met and spoke with Bobby Sands, the leader of the IRA prisoners participating in the hunger strike, predicting that Sands' dedication to his beliefs would lead to the hunger striker's death, which occurred on 5 May 1981.

Following disagreements with Cardinal Cahal Daly, Buckley was assigned to Kilkeel parish in 1983. Buckley claimed that Cardinal Daly later offered to move him to an Australian parish before deciding to assign him to Larne, a mainly Protestant town, in 1984. Daly then suspended Buckley from the priesthood in 1986.

Buckley continued to attract attention and clashed with Daly in public. When told his service in the diocese was no longer needed, Buckley refused to move out of the parochial home. In 2011 he brought a legal case against the Diocese of Down and Connor claiming Squatters' Rights. In January 2012, an agreement was reached between the parties which allowed Buckley to remain in the property.

== Independent ministry and excommunication ==
Buckley soon began to organise bi-weekly Masses, and he officiated at the marriages of divorcees who wished to remarry, as well as baptising babies from inter-faith marriages and blessing same-sex couples. In August 2016, Buckley claimed to have married over 3,000 couples. On 19 May 1998 he was ordained a bishop by Michael Cox.

In June 1998, Jim Cantwell, director of the Irish Catholic Press and Information Office, said that Cox's consecration of Buckley was valid, but illicit. In response, both Cox and Buckley were excommunicated by the Catholic Church.

== Local councillor ==
Buckley was elected to Larne Borough Council in the 1989 Northern Ireland local elections, but lost his seat at the following elections in 1993.

== Sham marriage conviction ==
In December 2013, Buckley pleaded guilty and was convicted for officiating at 14 sham marriages. His defence was that his actions had been motivated by "strong compassion" for the illegal immigrants' situations.

The judge noted that Buckley had "had a genuine affinity with these illegal immigrants", but had received financial reward and "lost face and standing in the community" as a result of his actions. Buckley received a three-and-a-half-year sentence, which was suspended for three years, because he was being treated for HIV.

== Personal life ==
In October 1999, Buckley announced that he was gay. In February 2010, he married his boyfriend of three years, 32-year-old Eduardo Yanga from the Philippines, in a ceremony in Larne.

Buckley died from a short illness on 17 May 2024, at the age of 72.

His official status in the Catholic Church at the time of his death was described as being that of a suspended priest.
