= Lindsay Mason =

Northern Irish unionist politician and businessman

Member of Larne Borough Council
- In office 19 May 1993 – 25 August 2006
- Preceded by: Pat Buckley
- Succeeded by: Michael Lynch
- Constituency: Larne Town

Leader of the Ulster Constitution Party
- In office 1971–1974
- Preceded by: Party created
- Succeeded by: Party dissolved

Member of Belfast City Council
- In office 1972 – 30 May 1973
- Succeeded by: District abolished
- Constituency: Lower Falls

Personal details
- Born: April 1942 Larne, Northern Ireland
- Died: 25 August 2006 (aged 64)
- Party: Independent Unionist (from 1977); Ulster Constitution Party (1971–1974)
- Other political affiliations: National Front (1974–1977)

Robert Lindsay Mason (April 1942 – 25 August 2006), known as Lindsay Mason, was a Northern Irish unionist politician and businessman. Known as something of an eccentric, Mason's entire career in politics was spent outside the major unionist parties such as the Ulster Unionist Party and the Democratic Unionist Party.

== Early life ==
Born in Larne, Mason was the son of a local paper mill manager. He studied at the Royal School Dungannon and Vernon College before becoming an antiques dealer.

Mason became involved in Ulster loyalism, running a weekly stall in Belfast City Centre which sold newspapers published by the paramilitary Ulster Volunteer Force, alongside his own publication, the Ulster Constitution. In 1971, he founded the far right Ulster Constitution Party with David Riddelsdell, a group described by David Kerr as "ultra-loyalist".

== Belfast City Council ==
In 1972, he was elected to Belfast City Council in a by-election, representing the predominantly Catholic Lower Falls, although this victory was only achieved because all the Irish nationalist and republican parties refused to nominate candidates, in protest at the introduction of internment. Mason had been elected unopposed as no other unionist candidates had stood although he did not campaign on the Falls for safety reasons, stating "I am sure there are a few trigger happy republicans in there and I don't want to take the risk of being a handy target for one of them". According to Malachi O'Doherty, Mason had to ask permission from his mother, with whom he lived, to go on to the Falls when, following the election, O'Doherty suggested they have a photoshoot for the new councillor on the road.

Due to his eccentricities and the fact that he wasn't tied to any major party, Mason received wide coverage in the local press whilst a member of the council. He held regular loyalist protest meetings inside Belfast City Hall and at one of these a group of female supporters attacked Social Democratic and Labour Party member Paddy Wilson, attempting to tear off his clothing following an ambush from which Wilson was forced to flee. While a sitting councillor, his firearm licence was withdrawn by the police, and he instead purchased a bow and arrow, with which he patrolled his local streets.

== Off the council ==
Following a review of local government in Northern Ireland, Belfast's council wards were redrawn in 1973, and Mason lost his seat in the ensuing election. One month later, he stood for East Belfast at the 1973 Northern Ireland Assembly election, but was not elected.

In 1974, Mason joined the British National Front, merging the Constitution Party into it. He stood for Ards Borough Council at the 1977 Northern Ireland local elections, describing himself as an "independent Protestant loyalist", but was not successful. Following this defeat, he relocated to Penarth in Wales, where he ran the antiques shop "Beautiful Things".

== Larne ==
Mason returned to Northern Ireland in the mid-1980s, suffering a major heart attack on the journey over, but he established a new antiques shop in Larne, and became a well-known character in the town, wearing colourful tracksuits and baseball caps, and driving a pink Cadillac El Dorado. In 1993, he stood for Larne Borough Council as an independent anti-corruption candidate, and was elected. He announced his intent to stand for election by declaring "I'm going to drag the council into the 1990s, but I'll do it gradually and get them into the 1790s first". He pursued various environmental campaigns, and held his seat in 1997, 2001 and 2005, claiming that he was not a good councillor, but was re-elected as the other candidates were worse. He was known for his flamboyant style of dress whilst attending council meetings in Larne, typically wearing tracksuit bottoms, Nike Air Max trainers and a multi-coloured jersey in a chamber where suits were standard attire. His style of canvassing was regarded as unorthodox as he carried a loudspeaker into Larne centre and engaged with passing shoppers. In 1997 he issued a call for members of the public to be allowed to view council meetings. When the new council building in Larne was officially opened by a member of the Royal Family, Mason held a protest outside the building complaining of the cost to build it. He frequently engaged in heated arguments with other councillors, and was removed by police from the council chamber on several occasions. On one such occasion in 2002 Mason had his removal from the council chambers examined by the Police Ombudsman for Northern Ireland. Mason had been removed following a fiery argument with mayor Bobby McKee. He was also noted for a campaign against the financial interests of Roy Beggs, which resulted in Beggs being investigated by Parliamentary Commissioner for Standards Elizabeth Filkin regarding undeclared business interests. As a result of the investigation, Beggs was forced to pay back over £2000 in expenses.

He was less successful in national elections, failing to win a seat in East Antrim at the 1997 and 2001 general elections, and in the Assembly constituency in 1998 and 2003. In 1998 he ran as an independent pro-Belfast Agreement candidate, with his campaign largely focussing on what he saw as the lack of commitment to the deal from the Ulster Unionist Party.

== Death ==
Mason died as a result of heart failure. In the months leading up to his death he was in steadily decreasing health. He had asthma and breathing problems. Fellow councillor and friend Danny O'Connor had mentioned family bereavements including his mother and aunt had taken a toll on Mason's health. He was buried in Clandeboye cemetery in Bangor.

== Personal life ==
Outside politics, Mason was known for having Asperger syndrome, his close attachment to his pet dog Honey, his love of rave music – he spent his 54th birthday at an all-night rave – and for regularly calling into radio discussion programmes. On one occasion, he was selected as a reserve for the television quiz Who Wants to Be a Millionaire?, although he did not appear on the show.

== Sources ==
- O'Doherty, Malachi (2007). The Telling Year: Belfast 1972. Gill & Macmillan Ltd. ISBN 9780717141906.
