= Bobby McKee =

Northern Irish politician (1941–2021)

Bobby McKee MBE

Mayor of Larne
- In office 2011–2012
- Preceded by: Andy Wilson
- Succeeded by: Geraldine Mulvenna
- In office 2008–2009
- Preceded by: Mark Dunn
- Succeeded by: Andy Wilson
- In office 2002–2004
- Preceded by: David Fleck
- Succeeded by: Roy Craig

Larne Borough Councillor
- In office 17 May 1989 – 22 May 2014
- Preceded by: John Alexander
- Succeeded by: Council abolished
- Constituency: Larne Lough

Personal details
- Born: Robert McKee; 1941 Larne, Northern Ireland
- Died: 24 January 2021 (aged 79–80) Antrim Area Hospital, Antrim, Northern Ireland
- Party: Democratic Unionist Party
- Relations: Jack McKee (brother)

Military service
- Branch/service: Ulster Volunteer Force
- Battles/wars: The Troubles

Bobby McKee MBE (1941 – 24 January 2021) was a Northern Irish Ulster loyalist politician and former member of the Ulster Volunteer Force (UVF), from Larne.

== Background ==
McKee was a Democratic Unionist Party councillor and a member of Larne Borough Council from 1989 to 2015. He served as a Mayor of Larne in 2004 and 2008. His brother Jack McKee, who died in 2015, was a DUP councillor in Larne and subsequently a member of the Traditional Unionist Voice.

He lost both his legs in 1974 as the result of a Provisional IRA car bomb when he was a member of the UVF. A founder member and chairman of the N.I. Amputees Association he was also chairman of Larne Disabled Fitness Suite. Bobby was Vice chairman of C.A.B. and was a member for 10 years. A member of N.I. Housing Council for 15 years he served as a board member for 6 years. He received an MBE in Queen Elizabeth II's 2004 New Year Honours in recognition of his services to local government.

In 2009, McKee led a welcoming delegation to the Catholic Ancient Order of Hibernians at Larne Borough Council headquarters in an attempt to boost cross community relations in the area in what was described as a historic day. In 2010 McKee condemned a British National Party leafleting campaign in Larne regarding a new refugee centre being built in the town and accused the BNP of whipping up racial tension.

McKee died on 24 January 2021 at Antrim Area Hospital in Antrim.

Civic offices
Preceded by David Fleck	Mayor of Larne; 2002–2004	Succeeded by Roy Craig
Preceded by Andy Wilson	Mayor of Larne; 2011–2012	Succeeded by Gerardine Mulvenna
