= 1981 Larne Borough Council election =

Local government election in Northern Ireland

| ← 1977 | 20 May 1981 | 1985 → |

All 15 seats to Larne Borough Council 8 seats needed for a majority
| | First party | Second party | Third party |
|---|---|---|---|
| Party | DUP | UUP | Alliance |
| Seats won | 6 | 4 | 3 |
| Seat change | ▲3 | ▲2 | ▼1 |
| | Fourth party | Fifth party | Sixth party |
| Party | United Loyalist | Ind. Nationalist | Vanguard |
| Seats won | 1 | 1 | 0 |
| Seat change | ▲1 | ▲1 | ▼3 |
| | Seventh party | Eighth party |
| Party | Independent | SDLP |
| Seats won | 0 | 0 |
| Seat change | ▼2 | ▼1 |

Elections to Larne Borough Council were held on 20 May 1981 on the same day as the other Northern Irish local government elections. The election used three district electoral areas to elect a total of 15 councillors.

== Election results ==
Larne Borough Council Election Result 1981
| Party | Seats | Gains | Losses | Net gain/loss | Seats % | Votes % | Votes | +/− |
|---|---|---|---|---|---|---|---|---|
| DUP | 6 | 3 | 0 | ▲3 | 40.0 | 37.2 | 4,366 | ▲12.3 |
| UUP | 4 | 2 | 0 | ▲2 | 26.7 | 24.2 | 2,845 | ▲17.4 |
| Alliance | 3 | 0 | 1 | ▼1 | 20.0 | 17.4 | 2,042 | ▼8.4 |
| Ind. Nationalist | 1 | 0 | 0 | ▲1 | 6.7 | 7.5 | 875 | ▲7.5 |
| United Loyalist | 1 | 1 | 0 | ▲1 | 6.7 | 6.2 | 728 | ▲6.2 |
| Independent | 0 | 0 | 2 | ▼2 | 0.0 | 4.3 | 504 | ▼6.8 |

Note: "Votes" are the first preference votes.

== Districts summary ==
Results of the Larne Borough Council election, 1981 by district
| Ward | % | Cllrs | % | Cllrs | % | Cllrs | % | Cllrs | Total Cllrs |
| Ward | DUP | | UUP | | Alliance | | Others | | Total Cllrs |
|---|---|---|---|---|---|---|---|---|---|
| Area A | 30.8 | 1 | 27.7 | 1 | 14.5 | 1 | 27.0 | 1 | 4 |
| Area B | 44.6 | 2 | 16.7 | 1 | 8.6 | 0 | 30.1 | 1 | 4 |
| Area C | 37.2 | 3 | 26.0 | 2 | 23.4 | 2 | 13.4 | 0 | 7 |
| Total | 37.2 | 6 | 24.2 | 4 | 17.4 | 3 | 21.2 | 2 | 15 |

== Districts results ==
=== Area A ===
1977: 1 x DUP, 1 x UUP, 1 x Alliance, 1 x Independent Nationalist
1981: 2 x UUP, 1 x DUP, 1 x Alliance, 1 x SDLP
1977-1981 Change: Independent Nationalist gain from SDLP

Larne Area A - 4 seats
| Party | Candidate | FPv% | Count | | |
| Party | Candidate | FPv% | 1 | 2 | 3 |
|---|---|---|---|---|---|
| UUP | Thomas Robinson* | 27.71% | 897 | | |
| Ind. Nationalist | William Cunning | 27.03% | 875 | | |
| DUP | Rachel Rea* | 17.98% | 582 | 715.4 | |
| Alliance | Hugh Wilson* | 14.49% | 469 | 520.91 | 745.19 |
| DUP | Robert Campbell | 12.79% | 414 | 470.26 | 472.42 |
Electorate: 5,107 Valid: 3,237 (63.38%) Spoilt: 74 Quota: 648 Turnout: 3,311 (64.83%)

=== Area B ===
1977: 1 x DUP, 1 x UUP, 1 x Alliance, 1 x Vanguard
1981: 2 x DUP, 1 x UUP, 1 x United Loyalist
1977-1981 Change: DUP and United Loyalist gain from Alliance and Vanguard

Larne Area B - 4 seats
| Party | Candidate | FPv% | Count | | |
| Party | Candidate | FPv% | 1 | 2 | 3 |
|---|---|---|---|---|---|
| DUP | John Alexander | 23.13% | 647 | | |
| DUP | Samuel McAllister | 21.45% | 600 | | |
| UUP | Laurence Niblock* | 19.56% | 547 | 562.96 | |
| United Loyalist | Roy Beggs* | 16.66% | 466 | 514.26 | 575.26 |
| UUP | Alexander Hunter* | 10.58% | 296 | 314.81 | 429.81 |
| Alliance | William Calwell* | 11.54% | 241 | 244.61 | |
Electorate: 4,510 Valid: 2,797 (62.02%) Spoilt: 68 Quota: 560 Turnout: 2,865 (63.53%)

=== Area C ===
1977: 2 x Alliance, 2 x Vanguard, 2 x Independent, 1 x DUP
1981: 3 x DUP, 2 x UUP, 2 x Alliance
1977-1981 Change: DUP (two seats) and UUP (two seats) gain from Vanguard (two seats) and Independent (two seats)

Larne Area C - 7 seats
| Party | Candidate | FPv% | Count | | | | | | | | | | |
| Party | Candidate | FPv% | 1 | 2 | 3 | 4 | 5 | 6 | 7 | 8 | 9 | 10 | 11 |
|---|---|---|---|---|---|---|---|---|---|---|---|---|---|
| DUP | Jack McKee* | 25.18% | 1,436 | | | | | | | | | | |
| UUP | Robert Robinson | 13.50% | 770 | | | | | | | | | | |
| DUP | Winston Fulton | 8.93% | 509 | 927 | | | | | | | | | |
| Alliance | William Kelly* | 8.91% | 508 | 514.5 | 515.8 | 532.8 | 557.8 | 559.41 | 605.38 | 620.42 | 927.42 | | |
| Alliance | Thomas Benson* | 7.50% | 428 | 428.5 | 430.06 | 442.56 | 464.56 | 467.36 | 504.62 | 518.95 | 641.52 | 847.12 | |
| DUP | Leonard Sluman | 3.12% | 178 | 348 | 529.48 | 539.48 | 551 | 552.54 | 565.84 | 628.8 | 630.3 | 630.3 | 633.5 |
| UUP | Rosalie Armstrong* | 6.79% | 387 | 405.5 | 413.04 | 419.54 | 439.3 | 460.02 | 498.9 | 597.22 | 598.79 | 601.99 | 629.99 |
| UUP | Joseph Wallace | 5.70% | 325 | 348 | 354.24 | 360.24 | 393.74 | 412.57 | 459.91 | 533.55 | 541.62 | 544.82 | 564.82 |
| Alliance | Amelia Kelly | 6.94% | 396 | 398.5 | 398.5 | 412.5 | 423.5 | 423.78 | 467.92 | 474.06 | | | |
| United Loyalist | Samuel Martin* | 4.59% | 262 | 302.5 | 309.78 | 317.28 | 326.78 | 330.98 | 358.14 | | | | |
| Independent | James Clements | 3.82% | 218 | 233.5 | 236.36 | 281.36 | 302.12 | 304.71 | | | | | |
| Independent | Agnew Hamilton* | 2.74% | 156 | 160 | 161.56 | 173.56 | | | | | | | |
| Independent | Patrick Todd | 1.21% | 69 | 74.5 | 75.28 | | | | | | | | |
| Independent | William Fleck | 1.07% | 61 | 65.5 | 66.02 | | | | | | | | |
Electorate: 10,614 Valid: 5,703 (53.73%) Spoilt: 191 Quota: 713 Turnout: 5,894 (55.53%)
