= 1977 Larne Borough Council election =

Local government election in Northern Ireland

← 1973	18 May 1977	1981 →

All 15 seats to Larne Borough Council 8 seats needed for a majority
	First party	Second party	Third party
Party	Alliance	Vanguard	DUP
Seats won	4	3	3
Seat change	▲1	▲3	▲3
	Fourth party	Fifth party	Sixth party
Party	UUP	Independent	SDLP
Seats won	2	2	1
Seat change	▲1	Steady	▲1
	Seventh party	Eighth party
Party	Loyalist	Ind. Unionist
Seats won	0	0
Seat change	▼8	▼1

Elections to Larne Borough Council were held on 18 May 1977 on the same day as the other Northern Irish local government elections. The election used three district electoral areas to elect a total of 15 councillors.

== Election results ==
Larne Borough Council Election Result 1977
Party	Seats	Gains	Losses	Net gain/loss	Seats %	Votes %	Votes	+/−
Alliance	4	1	0	▲1	26.7	25.8	1,965	▲0.3
Vanguard	3	3	0	▲3	20.0	27.2	2,067	New
DUP	3	3	0	▲3	20.0	24.9	1,898	New
Independent	2	1	1	Steady	13.3	11.1	844	▲1.7
UUP	2	1	0	▲1	13.3	6.8	515	▲2.0
SDLP	1	1	0	▲1	6.7	0.0	0	▼4.1
British Ulster Dominion Party	0	0	0	Steady	0.0	2.3	178	New
UUUP	0	0	0	Steady	0.0	1.9	146	New

Note: "Votes" are the first preference votes.

== Districts summary ==
Results of the Larne Borough Council election, 1977 by district
Ward	%	Cllrs	%	Cllrs	%	Cllrs	%	Cllrs	%	Cllrs	Total Cllrs
Ward	Alliance		Vanguard		DUP		UUP		Others		Total Cllrs
Area A	N/A	1	N/A	0	N/A	1	N/A	1	N/A	1	4
Area B	21.5	1	23.3	1	36.9	1	18.3	1	0.0	0	4
Area C	27.7	2	28.8	2	19.7	1	1.7	0	22.1	2	7
Total	25.8	4	27.2	3	24.9	3	6.8	2	15.3	3	15

== Districts results ==
=== Area A ===
1973: 1 x Alliance, 1 x UUP, 1 x Loyalist, 1 x Independent
1977: 1 x Alliance, 1 x UUP, 1 x DUP, 1 x SDLP
1973-1977 Change: SDLP gain from Independent, Loyalist joins DUP

Larne Area A - 4 seats
Party	Candidate	FPv%	Count
Party	Candidate	FPv%	1
DUP	Samuel Martin*	N/A	N/A
UUP	Thomas Robinson	N/A	N/A
Alliance	Hugh Wilson*	N/A	N/A
SDLP	John Turnley	N/A	N/A
Electorate: N/A Valid: N/A Spoilt: N/A Quota: N/A Turnout: N/A

- As only four candidates had been nominated for four seats, there was no vote in Area A and all four candidates were deemed elected.

=== Area B ===
1973: 3 x Loyalist, 1 x Independent Unionist
1977: 1 x DUP, 1 x Vanguard, 1 x Alliance, 1 x UUP
1973-1977 Change: Vanguard and Alliance gain from Loyalist (two seats), Loyalist joins DUP and Independent Unionist joins UUP

Larne Area B - 4 seats
Party	Candidate	FPv%	Count		
Party	Candidate	FPv%	1	2	3
DUP	Roy Beggs*	29.20%	675		
Alliance	William Calwell	21.54%	498		
UUP	Alexander Hunter*	18.30%	423	457.88	517.88
Vanguard	Laurence Niblock	13.02%	301	309.64	464.64
DUP	Horace Stronge	7.66%	177	321	336
Vanguard	Robert Semple*	10.29%	238	261.04	
Electorate: 4,705 Valid: 2,312 (49.14%) Spoilt: 103 Quota: 463 Turnout: 2,415 (51.33%)

=== Area C ===
1973: 4 x Loyalist, 2 x Alliance, 1 x Independent
1977: 2 x Alliance, 2 x Vanguard, 2 x Independent, 1 x DUP
1973-1977 Change: Independent gain from Loyalist, Loyalist (three seats) join Vanguard (two seats) and DUP

Larne Area C - 7 seats
Party	Candidate	FPv%	Count										
Party	Candidate	FPv%	1	2	3	4	5	6	7	8	9	10	11
Vanguard	Thomas Seymour*	24.01%	1,273										
Alliance	William Kelly*	17.34%	919										
DUP	Jack McKee*	11.94%	633	645	645.84	650.84	679.84						
Alliance	Thomas Benson*	6.83%	362	419.6	564.36	572.8	575.28	575.28	577.76	579.04	735.04		
Independent	Kathleen O'Brien	9.32%	494	550.64	561.56	580.84	610.68	611.35	626.83	636.87	675.03		
Vanguard	Rosalie Armstrong*	3.24%	172	361.6	363	381.44	408.68	410.69	424.61	578.93	610.89	626.53	629.05
Independent	Agnew Hamilton	6.60%	350	439.76	449.84	461.96	484.24	485.58	495.06	510.46	563.26	618.34	623.94
DUP	Winston Fulton	7.79%	413	419.24	420.08	424.56	447.04	458.43	588.77	605.25	609.01	609.69	610.25
Alliance	John Snoddy	3.51%	186	236.4	313.4	319.4	327.12	327.12	381.92	339.12			
Vanguard	Frederick Dodds	1.57%	83	183.8	186.04	194.96	213.88	213.88	220.88				
Dominion Party	James Wisely	3.36%	178	183.28	184.68	189.16	199.64	200.98					
UUUP	Thomas McKeever*	2.75%	146	168.08	168.64	182.68							
UUP	Alexander Marrs	1.74%	92	104.96	106.92								
Electorate: 10,203 Valid: 5,301 (51.96%) Spoilt: 145 Quota: 663 Turnout: 5,446 (53.38%)
