= 1973 Larne Borough Council election =

Local government election in Northern Ireland

30 May 1973	1977 →

All 15 seats to Larne Borough Council 8 seats needed for a majority
	First party	Second party	Third party
Party	Loyalist	Alliance	Independent
Seats won	8	3	2
	Fourth party	Fifth party
Party	UUP	Ind. Unionist
Seats won	1	1

Elections to Larne Borough Council were held on 30 May 1973 on the same day as the other Northern Irish local government elections. The election used three district electoral areas to elect a total of 15 councillors.

== Election results ==
Party	Seats	±	First Pref. votes	FPv%	±%
Loyalist	8		6,411	47.9	
Alliance	3		3,411	25.5	
Independent	2		1,254	9.4	
Ind. Unionist	1		955	7.2	
UUP	1		641	4.8	
SDLP	0		543	4.1	
NI Labour	0		182	1.4	
Totals	15		13,397	100.0	—

== Districts summary ==
Results of the Larne Borough Council election, 1973 by district
Ward	%	Cllrs	%	Cllrs	%	Cllrs	Total Cllrs
Ward	Alliance		UUP		Others		Total Cllrs
Area A	18.4	1	18.7	0	62.9	2	4
Area B	16.8	1	0.0	0	83.2	3	4
Area C	33.6	2	0.0	0	66.4	5	7
Total	25.5	3	4.8	1	69.7	11	15

== Districts results ==
=== Area A ===
1973: 1 x Alliance, 1 x UUP, 1 x Loyalist, 1 x Independent

Larne Area A - 4 seats
Party	Candidate	FPv%	Count				
Party	Candidate	FPv%	1	2	3	4	5
Loyalist	Samuel Martin	21.92%	751				
UUP	Douglas Harper	18.71%	641	983			
Alliance	Hugh Wilson	18.42%	631	668	810		
Independent	F. J. O'Neill	13.57%	465	469	526	583	639.4
SDLP	John Turnley	15.85%	543	543	544	546	553.52
Ind. Unionist	A. Crooks	11.53%	395				
Electorate: 5,026 Valid: 3,426 (68.17%) Spoilt: 33 Quota: 686 Turnout: 3,459 (68.82%)

=== Area B ===
1973: 3 x Loyalist, 1 x Independent Unionist

Larne Area B - 4 seats
Party	Candidate	FPv%	Count		
Party	Candidate	FPv%	1	2	3
Loyalist	Roy Beggs	20.47%	691		
Loyalist	Robert Semple	19.59%	661	814	
Loyalist	Nelson Stewart	16.03%	541	690	
Ind. Unionist	Alexander Hunter	16.59%	560	592	637
Alliance	R. Boyd	16.77%	566	584	596
Loyalist	Bob Morrow	10.55%	356		
Electorate: 4,961 Valid: 3,375 (68.03%) Spoilt: 57 Quota: 676 Turnout: 3,432 (69.18%)

=== Area C ===
1973: 4 x Loyalist, 2 x Alliance, 1 x Independent

Larne Area C - 7 seats
Party	Candidate	FPv%	Count											
Party	Candidate	FPv%	1	2	3	4	5	6	7	8	9	10	11	12
Loyalist	Thomas Seymour	18.39%	1,213											
Loyalist	Jack McKee	16.33%	1,077											
Alliance	William Kelly	15.89%	1,048											
Loyalist	Rosalie Armstrong	6.43%	424	554.24	606.22	607.69	662.13	668.6	684.58	722.91	903.91			
Loyalist	Thomas McKeever	5.11%	337	454.44	514.01	515.06	580.71	587.94	611.6	662.01	874.29			
Alliance	Thomas Benson	7.88%	520	525.76	526.22	567.38	568.38	614.7	629.46	648.31	653.61	662.61	663.76	866.76
Independent	A. Girvan	5.17%	341	352.52	364.82	358.6	359.7	373.12	452.57	610.41	619.61	643.61	645.22	728.22
Alliance	Margaret McIlgorm	4.62%	305	305.64	306.56	415.87	417.29	484.23	489.67	493.72	495.16	496.16	496.39	586.39
Alliance	Alexander Marrs	5.17%	341	348.68	351.21	399.72	403.78	427.83	447.75	468.7	474.72	477.72	478.41	
Loyalist	A. Milliken	4.23%	279	326.36	378.11	379.58	426.86	432.33	436.3	453.16				
Independent	William Workman	3.36%	232	242.88	247.25	249.77	252.14	258.89	333.17					
Independent	J. Sandford	3.27%	216	226.56	230.01	231.27	234.01	243.54						
NI Labour	R. Thompson	2.76%	182	186.8	188.87	196.43	198.12							
Loyalist	Horace Stronge	1.23%	81	120.36	184.07	184.49								
Electorate: 10,139 Valid: 6,596 (65.06%) Spoilt: 79 Quota: 825 Turnout: 6,675 (65.83%)
