= Larne Area A =

District electoral areas in Larne, Northern Ireland

Larne Area A was one of the three district electoral areas in Larne, Northern Ireland which existed from 1973 to 1985. The district elected four members to Larne Borough Council, and formed part of the North Antrim constituencies for the Northern Ireland Assembly and UK Parliament.

It was created for the 1973 local elections, and contained the wards of Ballyloran, Carncastle, Carnlough and Glenarm. It was abolished for the 1985 local elections and replaced by the Coast Road DEA.

== Councillors ==
Election	Councillor (Party)	Councillor (Party)	Councillor (Party)	Councillor (Party)
1981	Rachel Rea (DUP)	Thomas Robinson (UUP)	Hugh Wilson (Alliance)	William Cunning (Independent Nationalist)
1977	Samuel Martin (DUP)/ (Loyalist)	Thomas Robinson (UUP)	Hugh Wilson (Alliance)	John Turnley (SDLP)
1973	Samuel Martin (DUP)/ (Loyalist)	D. Harper (UUP)	Hugh Wilson (Alliance)	F. J. O'Neill (Independent)

== 1981 Election ==
1977: 1 x DUP, 1 x UUP, 1 x Alliance, 1 x Independent Nationalist

1981: 1 x UUP, 1 x DUP, 1 x Alliance, 1 x SDLP

1977-1981 Change: Independent Nationalist gain from SDLP

Larne Area A - 4 seats
Party	Candidate	FPv%	Count		
Party	Candidate	FPv%	1	2	3
UUP	Thomas Robinson*	27.71%	897		
Ind. Nationalist	William Cunning	27.03%	875		
DUP	Rachel Rea*	17.98%	582	715.4	
Alliance	Hugh Wilson*	14.49%	469	520.91	745.19
DUP	Robert Campbell	12.79%	414	470.26	472.42
Electorate: 5,107 Valid: 3,237 (63.38%) Spoilt: 74 Quota: 648 Turnout: 3,311 (64.83%)

== 1977 Election ==
1973: 1 x Alliance, 1 x UUP, 1 x Loyalist, 1 x Independent

1977: 1 x Alliance, 1 x UUP, 1 x DUP, 1 x SDLP

1973-1977 Change: SDLP gain from Independent, Loyalist joins DUP

Larne Area A - 4 seats
Party	Candidate	FPv%	Count
Party	Candidate	FPv%	1
DUP	Samuel Martin*	N/A	N/A
UUP	Thomas Robinson	N/A	N/A
Alliance	Hugh Wilson*	N/A	N/A
SDLP	John Turnley	N/A	N/A
Electorate: N/A Valid: N/A Spoilt: N/A Quota: N/A Turnout: N/A

- As only four candidates had been nominated for four seats, there was no vote in Area A and all four candidates were deemed elected.

== 1973 Election ==
1973: 1 x Alliance, 1 x UUP, 1 x Loyalist, 1 x Independent

Larne Area A - 4 seats
Party	Candidate	FPv%	Count				
Party	Candidate	FPv%	1	2	3	4	5
Loyalist	Samuel Martin	21.92%	751				
UUP	D. Harper	18.71%	641	983			
Alliance	Hugh Wilson	18.42%	631	668	810		
Independent	F. J. O'Neill	13.57%	465	469	526	583	639.4
SDLP	John Turnley	15.85%	543	543	544	546	553.52
Ind. Unionist	A. Crooks	11.53%	395				
Electorate: 5,026 Valid: 3,426 (68.17%) Spoilt: 33 Quota: 686 Turnout: 3,459 (68.82%)
