= Larne Area C =

District electoral areas in Larne, Northern Ireland

Larne Area C was one of the three district electoral areas in Larne, Northern Ireland which existed from 1973 to 1985. The district elected seven members to Larne Borough Council, and formed part of the North Antrim constituencies for the Northern Ireland Assembly and UK Parliament.

It was created for the 1973 local elections, and contained the wards of Antiville, Blackcave, Central, Craigy Hill, Gardenmore, Harbour and Town Parks. It was abolished for the 1985 local elections and mainly replaced by the Larne Town DEA, with areas also going to the Coast Road and Larne Lough DEAs.

== Councillors ==
Election	Councillor (Party)	Councillor (Party)	Councillor (Party)	Councillor (Party)	Councillor (Party)	Councillor (Party)	Councillor (Party)
1981	Jack McKee (DUP)/ (Loyalist)	Winston Fulton (DUP)	Leonard Sluman (DUP)	Rosalie Armstrong (UUP)/ (Vanguard)/ (Loyalist)	Robert Robinson (UUP)	William Kelly (Alliance)	Thomas Benson (Alliance)
1977	Jack McKee (DUP)/ (Loyalist)	Thomas Seymour (Vanguard)/ (Loyalist)	Kathleen O'Brien (Independent)	Rosalie Armstrong (UUP)/ (Vanguard)/ (Loyalist)	Agnew Hamilton (Independent)	William Kelly (Alliance)	Thomas Benson (Alliance)
1973	Jack McKee (DUP)/ (Loyalist)	Thomas Seymour (Vanguard)/ (Loyalist)	Thomas McKeever (Loyalist)	Rosalie Armstrong (UUP)/ (Vanguard)/ (Loyalist)	A. Girvan (Independent)	William Kelly (Alliance)	Thomas Benson (Alliance)

== 1981 Election ==
1977: 2 x Alliance, 2 x Vanguard, 2 x Independent, 1 x DUP

1981: 3 x DUP, 2 x UUP, 2 x Alliance

1977-1981 Change: DUP (two seats) and UUP (two seats) gain from Vanguard (two seats) and Independent (two seats)

Larne Area C - 7 seats
Party	Candidate	FPv%	Count										
Party	Candidate	FPv%	1	2	3	4	5	6	7	8	9	10	11
DUP	Jack McKee*	25.18%	1,436										
UUP	Robert Robinson	13.50%	770										
DUP	Winston Fulton	8.93%	509	927									
Alliance	William Kelly*	8.91%	508	514.5	515.8	532.8	557.8	559.41	605.38	620.42	927.42		
Alliance	Thomas Benson*	7.50%	428	428.5	430.06	442.56	464.56	467.36	504.62	518.95	641.52	847.12	
DUP	Leonard Sluman	3.12%	178	348	529.48	539.48	551	552.54	565.84	628.8	630.3	630.3	633.5
UUP	Rosalie Armstrong*	6.79%	387	405.5	413.04	419.54	439.3	460.02	498.9	597.22	598.79	601.99	629.99
UUP	Joseph Wallace	5.70%	325	348	354.24	360.24	393.74	412.57	459.91	533.55	541.62	544.82	564.82
Alliance	Amelia Kelly	6.94%	396	398.5	398.5	412.5	423.5	423.78	467.92	474.06			
United Loyalist	Samuel Martin*	4.59%	262	302.5	309.78	317.28	326.78	330.98	358.14				
Independent	James Clements	3.82%	218	233.5	236.36	281.36	302.12	304.71					
Independent	Agnew Hamilton*	2.74%	156	160	161.56	173.56							
Independent	Patrick Todd	1.21%	69	74.5	75.28								
Independent	William Fleck	1.07%	61	65.5	66.02								
Electorate: 10,614 Valid: 5,703 (53.73%) Spoilt: 191 Quota: 713 Turnout: 5,894 (55.53%)

== 1977 Election ==
1973: 4 x Loyalist, 2 x Alliance, 1 x Independent

1977: 2 x Alliance, 2 x Vanguard, 2 x Independent, 1 x DUP

1973-1977 Change: Independent gain from Loyalist, Loyalist (three seats) join Vanguard (two seats) and DUP

Larne Area C - 7 seats
Party	Candidate	FPv%	Count										
Party	Candidate	FPv%	1	2	3	4	5	6	7	8	9	10	11
Vanguard	Thomas Seymour*	24.01%	1,273										
Alliance	William Kelly*	17.34%	919										
DUP	Jack McKee*	11.94%	633	645	645.84	650.84	679.84						
Alliance	Thomas Benson*	6.83%	362	419.6	564.36	572.8	575.28	575.28	577.76	579.04	735.04		
Independent	Kathleen O'Brien	9.32%	494	550.64	561.56	580.84	610.68	611.35	626.83	636.87	675.03		
Vanguard	Rosalie Armstrong*	3.24%	172	361.6	363	381.44	408.68	410.69	424.61	578.93	610.89	626.53	629.05
Independent	Agnew Hamilton	6.60%	350	439.76	449.84	461.96	484.24	485.58	495.06	510.46	563.26	618.34	623.94
DUP	Winston Fulton	7.79%	413	419.24	420.08	424.56	447.04	458.43	588.77	605.25	609.01	609.69	610.25
Alliance	John Snoddy	3.51%	186	236.4	313.4	319.4	327.12	327.12	381.92	339.12			
Vanguard	Frederick Dodds	1.57%	83	183.8	186.04	194.96	213.88	213.88	220.88				
Dominion Party	James Wisely	3.36%	178	183.28	184.68	189.16	199.64	200.98					
UUUP	Thomas McKeever*	2.75%	146	168.08	168.64	182.68							
UUP	Alexander Marrs	1.74%	92	104.96	106.92								
Electorate: 10,203 Valid: 5,301 (51.96%) Spoilt: 145 Quota: 663 Turnout: 5,446 (53.38%)

== 1973 Election ==
1973: 4 x Loyalist, 2 x Alliance, 1 x Independent

Larne Area C - 7 seats
Party	Candidate	FPv%	Count											
Party	Candidate	FPv%	1	2	3	4	5	6	7	8	9	10	11	12
Loyalist	Thomas Seymour	18.39%	1,213											
Loyalist	Jack McKee	16.33%	1,077											
Alliance	William Kelly	15.89%	1,048											
Loyalist	Rosalie Armstrong	6.43%	424	554.24	606.22	607.69	662.13	668.6	684.58	722.91	903.91			
Loyalist	Thomas McKeever	5.11%	337	454.44	514.01	515.06	580.71	587.94	611.6	662.01	874.29			
Alliance	Thomas Benson	7.88%	520	525.76	526.22	567.38	568.38	614.7	629.46	648.31	653.61	662.61	663.76	866.76
Independent	A. Girvan	5.17%	341	352.52	364.82	358.6	359.7	373.12	452.57	610.41	619.61	643.61	645.22	728.22
Alliance	Margaret McIlgorm	4.62%	305	305.64	306.56	415.87	417.29	484.23	489.67	493.72	495.16	496.16	496.39	586.39
Alliance	Alexander Marrs	5.17%	341	348.68	351.21	399.72	403.78	427.83	447.75	468.7	474.72	477.72	478.41	
Loyalist	A. Milliken	4.23%	279	326.36	378.11	379.58	426.86	432.33	436.3	453.16				
Independent	William Workman	3.36%	232	242.88	247.25	249.77	252.14	258.89	333.17					
Independent	J. Sandford	3.27%	216	226.56	230.01	231.27	234.01	243.54						
NI Labour	R. Thompson	2.76%	182	186.8	188.87	196.43	198.12							
Loyalist	Horace Stronge	1.23%	81	120.36	184.07	184.49								
Electorate: 10,139 Valid: 6,596 (65.06%) Spoilt: 79 Quota: 825 Turnout: 6,675 (65.83%)
