= Coast Road (District Electoral Area) =

District electoral area in Northern Ireland

- Mid and East Antrim Borough Council DEA constituency

Current constituency
- Created: 1985
- Seats: 5 (1985-)
- Councillors: Andrew Clarke (DUP); James McKeown (SF); Maureen Morrow (UUP); Gerardine Mulvenna (APNI); Angela Smyth (DUP)

Coast Road DEA within Mid and East Antrim

Coast Road DEA (1993-2014) within Larne

Coast Road is one of the seven district electoral areas (DEA) in Mid and East Antrim, Northern Ireland. The district elects five members to Mid and East Antrim District Council and contains the wards of Cairncastle, Carnlough and Glenarm, Craigyhill, Gardenmore and The Maidens. Coast Road forms part of the East Antrim constituencies for the Northern Ireland Assembly and UK Parliament.

It was created for the 1985 local elections, replacing Larne Area A and part of Larne Area C which had existed since 1973, where it originally contained five wards (Ballyloran, Carncastle, Carnlough, Craigy Hill and Glenarm). For the 2014 local elections it gained most of Larne from the abolished Larne Town DEA.

== Councillors ==
Election	Councillor (Party)	Councillor (Party)	Councillor (Party)	Councillor (Party)	Councillor (Party)
2023	James McKeown (Sinn Féin)	Gerardine Mulvenna (Alliance)	Maureen Morrow (UUP)	Angela Smyth (DUP)	Andrew Clarke (DUP)
2019	James McKeown (Sinn Féin)	Gerardine Mulvenna (Alliance)	Maureen Morrow (UUP)	Angela Smyth (DUP)	Andrew Clarke (DUP)
October 2015 Co-Option	James McKeown (Sinn Féin)	Gerardine Mulvenna (Alliance)	Maureen Morrow (UUP)	Angela Smyth (DUP)	Ruth Wilson (TUV)
2014	James McKeown (Sinn Féin)	Gerardine Mulvenna (Alliance)	Maureen Morrow (UUP)	Gordon Lyons (DUP)	Ruth Wilson (TUV)
2011	Oliver McMullan (Sinn Féin)	Gerardine Mulvenna (Alliance)	Maureen Morrow (UUP)	Winston Fulton (DUP)	Brian Dunn (UUP)/ (Independent)
2005	Danny O'Connor (SDLP)	Gerardine Mulvenna (Alliance)	Rachel Rea (DUP)	Winston Fulton (DUP)	Brian Dunn (UUP)/ (Independent)
2001	Danny O'Connor (SDLP)	Gerardine Mulvenna (Alliance)	Rachel Rea (DUP)	Winston Fulton (DUP)	Joan Drummond (UUP)
1997	Danny O'Connor (SDLP)	William Cunning (Independent Nationalist)	Rachel Rea (DUP)	Thomas Robinson (UUP)	Joan Drummond (UUP)
1993	Amelia Kelly (Alliance)	William Cunning (Independent Nationalist)	Winston Fulton (DUP)	Thomas Robinson (UUP)	Joan Drummond (UUP)
1989	Amelia Kelly (Alliance)	William Cunning (Independent Nationalist)	Winston Fulton (DUP)	Thomas Robinson (UUP)	Joan Drummond (UUP)
1985	Amelia Kelly (Alliance)	William Cunning (Independent Nationalist)	Winston Fulton (DUP)	Thomas Robinson (UUP)	Rachel Rea (DUP)

== 2023 Election ==
2019: 2 x DUP, 1 x Alliance, 1 x Sinn Féin, 1 x UUP

2023: 2 x DUP, 1 x Alliance, 1 x Sinn Féin, 1 x UUP

2019–2023 Change: No change

Coast Road - 5 seats
Party	Candidate	FPv%	Count							
Party	Candidate	FPv%	1	2	3	4	5	6	7	8
Sinn Féin	James McKeown*	20.08%	1,180							
DUP	Andrew Clarke*	18.90%	1,111							
Alliance	Gerardine Mulvenna*	18.61%	1,094							
DUP	Angela Smyth*	13.75%	808	808.42	905.33	912.76	914.06	977.37	1,199.37	
UUP	Maureen Morrow*	7.78%	457	463.93	477.02	489.49	493.69	705.44	828.91	1,006.91
Alliance	Niamh Spurle	7.62%	448	587.65	588.31	678	776.9	795.02	800.35	801.35
TUV	Wesley Stevenson	5.79%	340	340.21	347.36	351.99	352.19	383.74		
UUP	Olivia Swan	5.55%	326	326.63	329.38	337.38	339.68			
Green (NI)	Eddie Alcorn	1.92%	113	159.83	160.49					
Electorate: 12,799 Valid: 5,877 (45.92%) Spoilt: 60 Quota: 980 Turnout: 5,937 (46.39%)

== 2019 Election ==
2014: 1 x UUP, 1 x Sinn Féin, 1 x Alliance, 1 x DUP, 1 x TUV

2019: 2 x DUP, 1 x Alliance, 1 x Sinn Féin, 1 x UUP

2014-2019 Change: DUP gain from TUV

Coast Road - 5 seats
Party	Candidate	FPv%	Count				
Party	Candidate	FPv%	1	2	3	4	5
Alliance	Geraldine Mulvenna*	21.67%	1,217				
DUP	Andrew Clarke	17.33%	973				
Sinn Féin	James McKeown*	15.55%	873	922.14	922.2	1,109.2	
UUP	Maureen Morrow*	12.96%	728	795.08	798.74	937.76	
DUP	Angela Smyth*	13.60%	764	771.28	794.32	817.46	828.46
TUV	Ruth Wilson*	10.70%	601	611.14	612.94	665.95	681.95
Independent	Martin Wilson	8.19%	460	597.02	597.29		
Electorate: 12,429 Valid: 5,616 (45.18%) Spoilt: 70 Quota: 937 Turnout: 5,686 (45.75%)

== 2014 Election ==
2011: 1 x DUP, 1 x Sinn Féin, 1 x UUP, 1 x Alliance, 1 x Independent

2014: 1 x DUP, 1 x UUP, 1 x Sinn Féin, 1 x Alliance, 1 x TUV

2011-2014 Change: TUV gain from Independent

Coast Road - 5 seats
Party	Candidate	FPv%	Count									
Party	Candidate	FPv%	1	2	3	4	5	6	7	8	9	10
UUP	Maureen Morrow*	17.56%	946									
Sinn Féin	James McKeown*	14.04%	756	756.1	756.1	761.15	785.2	930.2				
Alliance	Geraldine Mulvenna*	10.95%	590	598.35	600.4	635.7	701.95	910.95				
DUP	Gordon Lyons†	12.25%	660	669.85	677	692.1	722.55	730.7	732.7	736.38	1,133.38	
TUV	Ruth Wilson	10.68%	575	583.7	591.7	613.95	652.3	659.5	660.5	663.26	718.11	873.72
PUP	Jonathan Hodge	8.61%	464	466.25	473.3	477.4	523.7	536.8	553.8	558.4	610.06	688.32
DUP	Drew Niblock*	8.99%	484	494.3	499.3	504.45	536.7	544.8	550.8	552.64		
SDLP	Martin Wilson*	7.72%	416	417.1	417.1	425.15	486.4					
Independent	Danny O'Connor	3.49%	188	188.85	188.85	207						
BNP	Robert Bell	1.88%	101	101.8	140.25	153.3						
Independent	John Anderson	2.47%	133	134.3	134.3							
BNP	Steven Moore	1.34%	72	72.7								
Electorate: 12,427 Valid: 5,386 (43.34%) Spoilt: 58 Quota: 898 Turnout: 5,444 (43.81%)

== 2011 Election ==
2005: 2 x DUP, 1 x UUP, 1 x SDLP, 1 x Alliance

2011: 1 x DUP, 1 x Sinn Féin, 1 x UUP, 1 x Alliance, 1 x Independent

2005-2011 Change: Sinn Féin and Independent gain from SDLP and DUP

Coast Road - 5 seats
Party	Candidate	FPv%	Count						
Party	Candidate	FPv%	1	2	3	4	5	6	7
Sinn Féin	Oliver McMullan	18.53%	613						
Alliance	Gerardine Mulvenna*	10.28%	340	355.6	355.72	394.04	408.04	644.56	
DUP	Winston Fulton*	13.85%	458	458	474	507.12	550.12	556.36	
UUP	Maureen Morrow	8.92%	295	296.2	307.2	335.32	502.32	525.16	550.57
Independent	Brian Dunn*	10.61%	351	351.48	358.48	393.84	429.84	473.76	530.46
DUP	Gordon Lyons	10.40%	344	344.24	355.24	380.24	409.24	416.48	423.2
SDLP	Danny O'Connor*	9.92%	328	365.92	367.92	399.48	406.48		
UUP	Andrew Wilson	8.31%	275	275	289	312			
Green (NI)	Danny Donnelly	3.33%	110	114.32	116.32				
TUV	Kenneth Johnston	3.17%	105	105	121				
BNP	Steven Moore	2.69%	89	89.12					
Electorate: 6,832 Valid: 3,308 (48.42%) Spoilt: 54 Quota: 552 Turnout: 3,362 (49.21%)

== 2005 Election ==
2001: 2 x DUP, 1 x UUP, 1 x SDLP, 1 x Alliance

2005: 2 x DUP, 1 x UUP, 1 x SDLP, 1 x Alliance

2001-2005 Change: No change

Coast Road - 5 seats
Party	Candidate	FPv%	Count				
Party	Candidate	FPv%	1	2	3	4	5
DUP	Winston Fulton*	21.01%	770				
DUP	Rachel Rea*	13.83%	507	644.76			
SDLP	Danny O'Connor*	15.39%	564	564.42	640.42		
UUP	Brian Dunn*	13.67%	501	511.08	519.29	748.29	
Alliance	Gerardine Mulvenna*	12.03%	441	444.36	478.36	495.09	606.09
Sinn Féin	James McKeown	11.21%	411	411	476	477	478
UUP	Joan Drummond*	7.07%	259	265.93	271.93		
Independent	William Cunning	5.78%	212	212.21			
Electorate: 6,653 Valid: 3,665 (55.09%) Spoilt: 82 Quota: 611 Turnout: 3,747 (56.32%)

== 2001 Election ==
1997: 2 x UUP, 1 x DUP, 1 x SDLP, 1 x Independent Nationalist

2001: 2 x DUP, 1 x UUP, 1 x SDLP, 1 x Alliance

1997-2001 Change: DUP and Alliance gain from UUP and Independent Nationalist

Coast Road - 5 seats
Party	Candidate	FPv%	Count				
Party	Candidate	FPv%	1	2	3	4	5
DUP	Winston Fulton	17.49%	753				
SDLP	Danny O'Connor*	17.42%	750				
UUP	Joan Drummond*	14.26%	614	616	618.68	895.68	
Alliance	Gerardine Mulvenna	13.68%	589	701	701.2	721.2	
DUP	Rachel Rea*	11.27%	485	485	509.72	616.8	767.8
Independent	William Cunning*	8.80%	379	488	488	494.04	516.04
UUP	Thomas Robinson*	9.99%	430	431	432.44		
Sinn Féin	Martin Graffin	7.08%	305				
Electorate: 7,121 Valid: 4,305 (60.45%) Spoilt: 99 Quota: 718 Turnout: 4,404 (61.85%)

== 1997 Election ==
1993: 2 x UUP, 1 x DUP, 1 x Alliance, 1 x Independent Nationalist

1997: 2 x UUP, 1 x DUP, 1 x SDLP, 1 x Independent Nationalist

1993-1997 Change: SDLP gain from Alliance

Coast Road - 5 seats
Party	Candidate	FPv%	Count				
Party	Candidate	FPv%	1	2	3	4	5
UUP	Thomas Robinson*	17.09%	527				
UUP	Joan Drummond*	15.34%	473	522			
Ind. Nationalist	William Cunning*	16.28%	502	506	506.21	573.21	
SDLP	Danny O'Connor	13.27%	409	414	414.3	530.3	
DUP	Rachel Rea	10.15%	313	388	398.2	423.98	428.98
DUP	Winston Fulton*	10.18%	314	365	370.58	394.87	401.87
Alliance	Amelia Kelly*	10.28%	317	347	351.38		
DUP	George Robinson	5.03%	155				
Independent	Norman McCann	2.37%	73				
Electorate: 7,255 Valid: 3,083 (42.49%) Spoilt: 82 Quota: 514 Turnout: 3,165 (43.63%)

== 1993 Election ==
1989: 2 x UUP, 1 x DUP, 1 x Alliance, 1 x Independent Nationalist

1993: 2 x UUP, 1 x DUP, 1 x Alliance, 1 x Independent Nationalist

1989-1993 Change: No change

Coast Road - 5 seats
Party	Candidate	FPv%	Count				
Party	Candidate	FPv%	1	2	3	4	5
UUP	Thomas Robinson*	20.35%	612				
Ind. Nationalist	William Cunning*	19.95%	600				
UUP	Joan Drummond*	17.72%	533				
Alliance	Amelia Kelly*	14.99%	451	473.44	566.32		
DUP	Winston Fulton*	14.36%	432	457.08	457.89	494.08	515.59
DUP	Rachel Rea	12.63%	380	439.62	441.51	469.23	478.23
Electorate: 7,176 Valid: 3,008 (41.92%) Spoilt: 94 Quota: 502 Turnout: 3,102 (43.23%)

== 1989 Election ==
1985: 2 x DUP, 1 x UUP, 1 x Alliance, 1 x Independent Nationalist

1989: 2 x UUP, 1 x DUP, 1 x Alliance, 1 x Independent Nationalist

1985-1989 Change: UUP gain from DUP

Coast Road - 5 seats
Party	Candidate	FPv%	Count			
Party	Candidate	FPv%	1	2	3	4
UUP	Thomas Robinson*	23.19%	777			
Ind. Nationalist	William Cunning*	20.89%	700			
UUP	Joan Drummond	12.80%	429	554.72	561	
DUP	Winston Fulton*	14.26%	478	496.48	560.44	
Alliance	Amelia Kelly*	13.10%	439	446.84	454.4	592.32
DUP	Rachel Rea*	12.32%	413	465.08	507.72	508.64
DUP	Hill Taggart	3.43%	115	122		
Electorate: 7,089 Valid: 3,351 (47.27%) Spoilt: 90 Quota: 559 Turnout: 3,441 (48.54%)

== 1985 Election ==
1985: 2 x DUP, 1 x UUP, 1 x Alliance, 1 x Independent Nationalist

Coast Road - 5 seats
Party	Candidate	FPv%	Count			
Party	Candidate	FPv%	1	2	3	4
UUP	Thomas Robinson*	22.25%	782			
Ind. Nationalist	William Cunning*	21.48%	755			
DUP	Winston Fulton*	18.07%	635			
Alliance	Amelia Kelly	12.94%	455	468.75	629.57	
DUP	Rachel Rea*	13.97%	491	533.75	535.04	674.04
UUP	Samuel Martin	6.66%	234	356.25	360.12	371.12
DUP	Hill Taggart	4.64%	163	175	175.86	
Electorate: 6,875 Valid: 3,515 (51.13%) Spoilt: 82 Quota: 586 Turnout: 3,597 (52.32%)
