= Gordon Lyons =

Minister for Communities of Northern Ireland since 2024

Gordon Lyons MLA
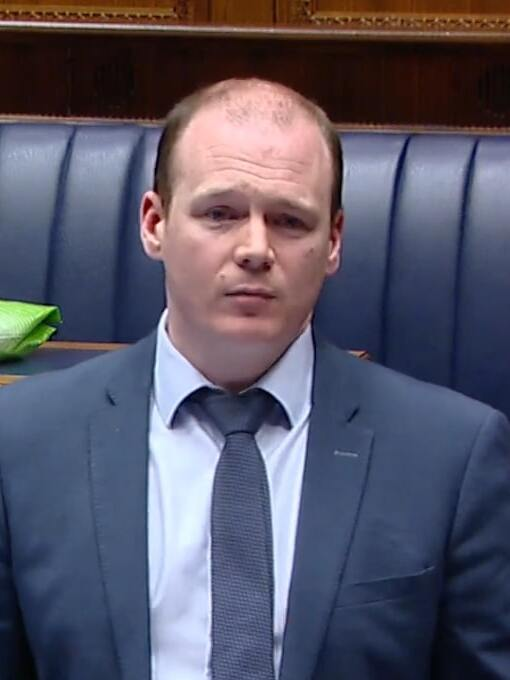

Minister for Communities
- Incumbent
- Assumed office 3 February 2024
- First Minister: Michelle O'Neill
- Preceded by: Deirdre Hargey

Minister for the Economy
- In office 6 July 2021 – 27 October 2022
- First Minister: Paul Givan; Vacant
- Preceded by: Paul Frew
- Succeeded by: Conor Murphy (2024)

Minister of Agriculture, Environment, and Rural Affairs
- In office 2 February 2021 – 8 March 2021
- First Minister: Arlene Foster
- Preceded by: Edwin Poots
- Succeeded by: Edwin Poots

Junior Minister at the Executive Office
- In office 8 March 2021 – 17 June 2021 Serving with Declan Kearney
- First Minister: Arlene Foster
- Preceded by: Gary Middleton
- Succeeded by: Gary Middleton
- In office 11 January 2020 – 2 February 2021 Serving with Declan Kearney
- First Minister: Arlene Foster
- Preceded by: Alastair Ross
- Succeeded by: Gary Middleton

Member of the Northern Ireland Assembly for East Antrim
- Incumbent
- Assumed office 19 August 2015
- Preceded by: Sammy Wilson

Member of Mid and East Antrim Borough Council
- In office 22 May 2014 – 19 August 2015
- Preceded by: Council established
- Succeeded by: Angela Smyth
- Constituency: Coast Road

Personal details
- Born: 6 March 1986 (age 40) Coleraine, Northern Ireland
- Party: Democratic Unionist Party
- Education: Newcastle University

Gordon Lyons (born 6 March 1986) is a Northern Irish unionist politician, serving as Minister for Communities since 2024. He has also served as Director of Elections for the Democratic Unionist Party (DUP) since 2021. He was Minister for the Economy in the Northern Ireland Executive from 2021 to 2022, and has been a Member of the Northern Ireland Assembly (MLA) for East Antrim since August 2015. He is the DUP's Spokesperson for Finance, Public Service Reform and the Northern Ireland Protocol as of 2023.

Upon his temporary appointment as Minister of Agriculture, Environment, and Rural Affairs in 2021, Lyons was described as an "up-and-coming" member of the DUP. In 2024, Lyons had been considered in the running to become deputy First Minister of Northern Ireland before DUP leader Jeffrey Donaldson selected Emma Little-Pengelly. However, in June 2025, he was beaten by DUP backbencher Paul Frew in an internal contest to become party secretary. Amidst the 2025 Northern Ireland riots, the Assembly Communities Committee expressed no confidence in Lyons as Minister on 12 June 2025.

== Career ==
=== Early career ===
Lyons worked as an assistant to DUP MLA Sammy Wilson for five years. He stood unsuccessfully in East Antrim at the 2011 Northern Ireland Assembly election, and also for the Coast Road area of Larne Borough Council in the local elections held that same day.

At the 2014 local elections, Lyons was elected for the Coast Road area on the new Mid and East Antrim District Council, and in August 2015, he was co-opted to take Wilson's place on the Assembly.

Lyons was re-elected at the 2016 Assembly Election, and was a member of the Economy Committee and Chairman of the Committee for Procedures.

Following his re-election at the 2017 NI Assembly Election, Lyons was appointed by DUP Leader Arlene Foster as the DUP Assembly Group Chief Whip.

=== Executive career (2020–present) ===
When devolution was restored on 11 January 2020, First Minister Arlene Foster appointed Lyons as Junior Minister in the Executive Office.

He served as the Minister of Agriculture, Environment, and Rural Affairs after Edwin Poots stood down temporarily for health reasons.

On 6 July 2021 he became Minister for the Economy after being appointed by the DUP's newly elected Leader Jeffrey Donaldson, taking over from Paul Frew.

==== Minister for Communities (2024–present) ====
When the Northern Ireland Assembly was restored on 3 February 2024, the new Executive was formed and the DUP appointed Lyons to serve as Minister for Communities. In 2025, Lyons introduced the Sign Language Bill, communicating in sign language for part of his speech.

In June 2025, Lyons was defeated "convincingly" by DUP backbencher Paul Frew in an internal contest to become party secretary.

===== 2025 Northern Ireland riots =====
People targeted in their homes during the 2025 Northern Ireland riots in Ballymena were temporarily moved to Larne leisure centre on 11 June 2025, which falls inside Lyons' East Antrim constituency. Lyons revealed this information in a social media post, stating that “It has been brought to my attention that a number of individuals were temporarily moved to Larne Leisure Centre in the early hours of the morning following the disturbances in Ballymena." Following this, the centre was set ablaze after vandalism at the facility on the third night of disorder across Northern Ireland as part of the riots. Lyons said he "strongly hit back at any notion" he had revealed the use of this facility but Sinn Féin Finance Minister John O'Dowd called for Lyons to consider his position, along with the Secretary of State for Northern Ireland Hilary Benn. The Green Party called for Lyons to resign.

====== Motion of no confidence ======
On 11 June 2025, the Leader of the Opposition Matthew O’Toole said that he will refer Lyons to the Assembly’s Standards Commissioner the next day. On 12 June, the 9-member Stormont Communities Committee voted no confidence in Lyons in a motion proposed by Maolíosa McHugh after the Committee Chair, Colm Gildernew, called for Lyons to consider his position. The First Minister of Northern Ireland, Michelle O'Neill, called for Lyons to resign following the vote of no confidence.

== Political views ==
=== Northern Ireland Protocol ===
In 2021, Lyons encouraged the public to sign a DUP petition calling for Prime Minister Boris Johnson to trigger Article 16 of the NI Protocol.

== Electoral history ==
Election	Constituency	Votes	%	Elected	Comment
Assembly 2011	East Antrim	1,321	4.55%	Not elected	1st run; 9th of 13
Council 2011	Coast Road	344	10.40%	Not elected	6th of 11
Council 2014	Coast Road	660	12.25%	Elected	4th of 12
Assembly 2016	East Antrim	3,472	10.71%	Elected	2nd of 15
Assembly 2017	East Antrim	3,851	10.29%	Elected	4th of 15
Assembly 2022	East Antrim	6,256	15.55%	Elected	2nd of 10

Northern Ireland Assembly
Preceded by Sammy Wilson	MLA for East Antrim; 2015–present	Incumbent
