= Larne Area B =

District electoral areas in Larne, Northern Ireland

Larne Area B was one of the three district electoral areas in Larne, Northern Ireland which existed from 1973 to 1985. The district elected four members to Larne Borough Council, and formed part of the North Antrim constituencies for the Northern Ireland Assembly and UK Parliament.

It was created for the 1973 local elections, and contained the wards of Ballycarry, Glynn, Island Magee and Kilwaughter. It was abolished for the 1985 local elections and replaced by the Larne Lough DEA.

== Councillors ==
Election	Councillor (Party)	Councillor (Party)	Councillor (Party)	Councillor (Party)
1981	John Alexander (DUP)	Samuel McAllister (DUP)	Laurence Niblock (UUP)/ (Vanguard)	Roy Beggs (United Loyalist)/ (DUP)/ (Loyalist)
1977	Alexander Hunter (UUP)/ (Independent Unionist)	William Calwell (Alliance)	Laurence Niblock (UUP)/ (Vanguard)	Roy Beggs (United Loyalist)/ (DUP)/ (Loyalist)
1973	Alexander Hunter (UUP)/ (Independent Unionist)	Robert Semple (Loyalist)	Nelson Stewart (Loyalist)	Roy Beggs (United Loyalist)/ (DUP)/ (Loyalist)

== 1981 Election ==
1977: 1 x DUP, 1 x UUP, 1 x Alliance, 1 x Vanguard

1981: 2 x DUP, 1 x UUP, 1 x United Loyalist

1977-1981 Change: DUP and United Loyalist gain from Alliance and Vanguard

Larne Area B - 4 seats
Party	Candidate	FPv%	Count		
Party	Candidate	FPv%	1	2	3
DUP	John Alexander	23.13%	647		
DUP	Samuel McAllister	21.45%	600		
UUP	Laurence Niblock*	19.56%	547	562.96	
United Loyalist	Roy Beggs*	16.66%	466	514.26	575.26
UUP	Alexander Hunter*	10.58%	296	314.81	429.81
Alliance	William Calwell*	11.54%	241	244.61	
Electorate: 4,510 Valid: 2,797 (62.02%) Spoilt: 68 Quota: 560 Turnout: 2,865 (63.53%)

== 1977 Election ==
1973: 3 x Loyalist, 1 x Independent Unionist

1977: 1 x DUP, 1 x Vanguard, 1 x Alliance, 1 x UUP

1973-1977 Change: Vanguard and Alliance gain from Loyalist (two seats), Loyalist joins DUP and Independent Unionist joins UUP

Larne Area B - 4 seats
Party	Candidate	FPv%	Count		
Party	Candidate	FPv%	1	2	3
DUP	Roy Beggs*	29.20%	675		
Alliance	William Calwell	21.54%	498		
UUP	Alexander Hunter*	18.30%	423	457.88	517.88
Vanguard	Laurence Niblock	13.02%	301	309.64	464.64
DUP	Horace Stronge	7.66%	177	321	336
Vanguard	Robert Semple*	10.29%	238	261.04	
Electorate: 4,705 Valid: 2,312 (49.14%) Spoilt: 103 Quota: 463 Turnout: 2,415 (51.33%)

== 1973 Election ==
1973: 3 x Loyalist, 1 x Independent Unionist

Larne Area B - 4 seats
Party	Candidate	FPv%	Count		
Party	Candidate	FPv%	1	2	3
Loyalist	Roy Beggs	20.47%	691		
Loyalist	Robert Semple	19.59%	661	814	
Loyalist	Nelson Stewart	16.03%	541	690	
Ind. Unionist	Alexander Hunter	16.59%	560	592	637
Alliance	R. Boyd	16.77%	566	584	596
Loyalist	Bob Morrow	10.55%	356		
Electorate: 4,961 Valid: 3,375 (68.03%) Spoilt: 57 Quota: 676 Turnout: 3,432 (69.18%)
