= East Antrim =

East Antrim can refer to:

- The eastern part of County Antrim
- East Antrim (Assembly constituency)
- East Antrim (UK Parliament constituency)
