= Danny Donnelly (politician) =

Alliance Party of Northern Ireland MLA

Danny Donnelly MLA
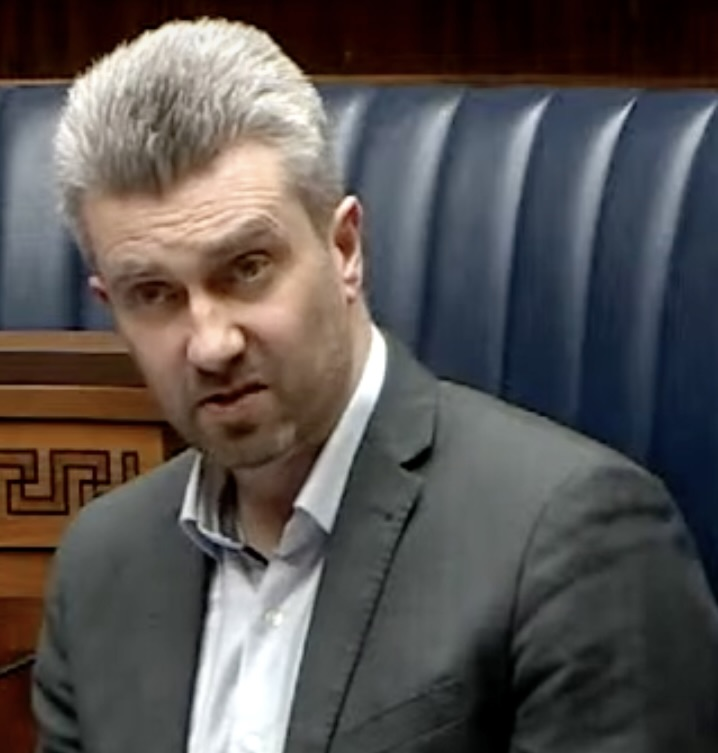
- Donnelly in 2024

Member of the Northern Ireland Assembly for East Antrim
- Incumbent
- Assumed office 5 May 2022
- Preceded by: Roy Beggs Jr

Member of Mid and East Antrim Borough Council
- In office 2 May 2019 – 5 May 2022
- Preceded by: Andrew Wilson
- Succeeded by: Maeve Donnelly
- Constituency: Larne Lough

Personal details
- Party: Alliance
- Other political affiliations: Green Party (until 2012)
- Spouse: Maeve Donnelly
- Education: St Killian's College
- Occupation: Politician

Danny Donnelly is an Alliance Party politician in Northern Ireland, serving as a Member of the Legislative Assembly (MLA) for East Antrim since May 2022.

== Political career ==
=== Early career (2011-2022) ===
Donnelly began his political career as a candidate for the Green Party NI in the 2011 local elections for Larne Borough Council, before leaving the party to join Alliance. Donnelly later ran in the newly formed Mid and East Antrim Borough Council in the 2014 local elections as the Alliance candidate for the Braid constituency, but failed to be elected.

Following this, he ran alongside Stewart Dickson in the 2016 and 2017 Northern Ireland Assembly elections, coming 9th and then 8th - but failing to be elected.

He then ran again for Mid and East Antrim District Council in the May 2019 local election, this time as one of the two Alliance candidates for the Larne Lough District. Donnelly was elected on the first count, polling the second most first preferences in the constituency (1,057 votes) and earning 17.66% of the vote.

Later that year, Donnelly replaced Stewart Dickson as the Alliance Party candidate for East Antrim. He contested the 2019 general election, increasing the Alliance Vote in the constituency by 11.7% and coming second. He reduced incumbent MP Sammy Wilson's majority from 15,923 in 2017 to 6,716.

=== Member of the Legislative Assembly (2022–) ===
Donnelly was elected to the 4th seat in East Antrim at the 2022 Assembly election, gaining a seat for Alliance at the expense of the UUP's Roy Beggs, elected, alongside running mate Stewart Dickson, on the fifth stage. He polled 4,224 FPVs, an increase from the 1,817 votes he received in 2017.

At the 2024 general election, Donnelly further reduced Wilson's majority to just 1,306 votes (3.3%), though also suffered a small decline in his own vote share by 0.4%.
