= Alastair Ross =

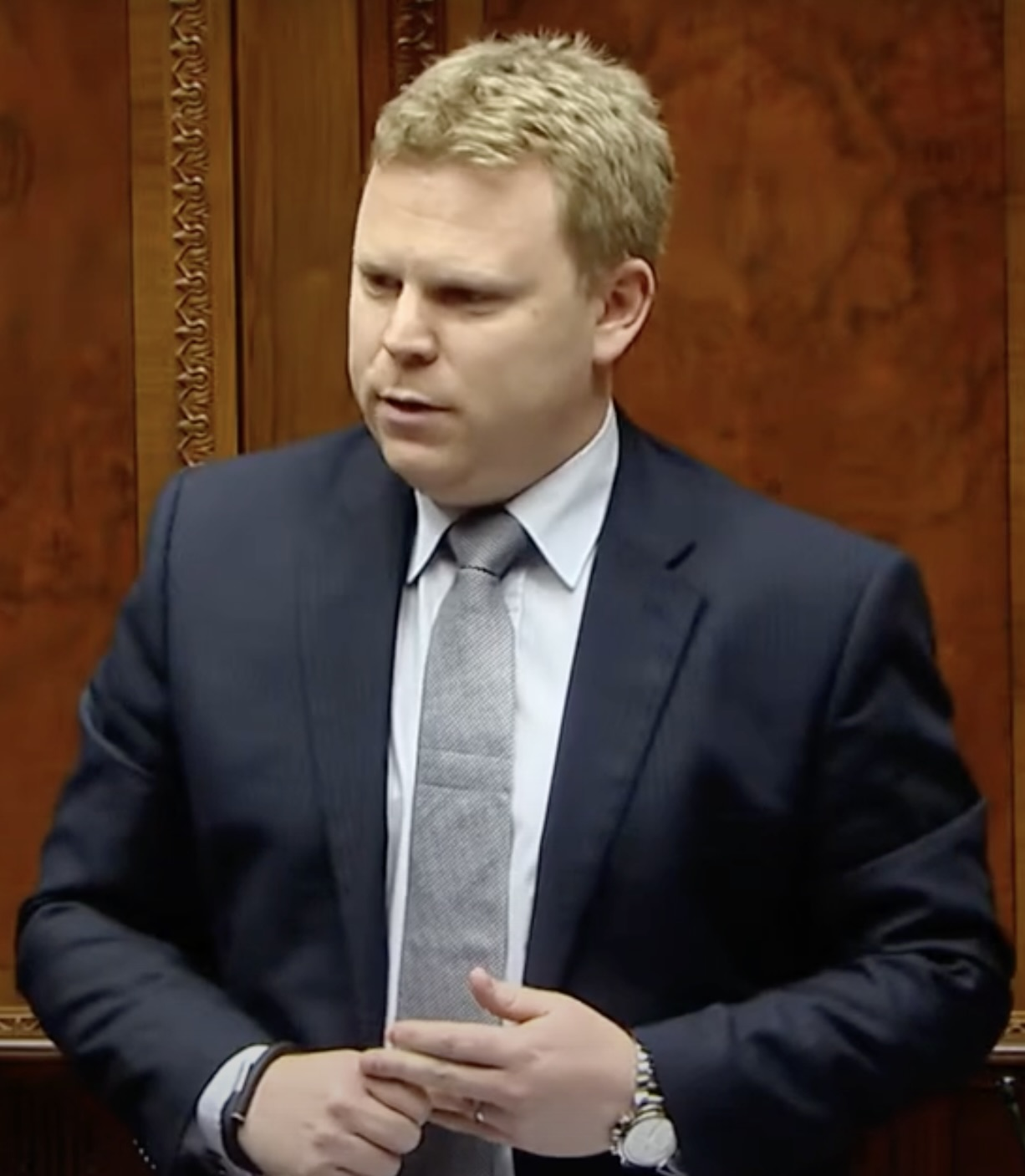
- Ross in 2014

Member of the Northern Ireland Assembly for Antrim East
- In office May 2007 – 26 January 2017
- Preceded by: George Dawson
- Succeeded by: John Stewart

Personal details
- Born: 4 March 1981 (age 45) Belfast, Northern Ireland
- Party: Democratic Unionist Party
- Education: University of Dundee

Alastair Ross (born 4 March 1981) is a British electoral officer and former Democratic Unionist Party (DUP) politician who was a Member of the Northern Ireland Assembly (MLA) for East Antrim from 2007 to 2017.

== Background ==
Ross studied at Friends' School in Lisburn and at the University of Dundee before returning to study Irish Politics at Queen's University Belfast. While there, he became a Democratic Unionist Party (DUP) activist. In 2005, he began working for Sammy Wilson as a parliamentary researcher, following a spell in DUP headquarters as a press officer in the lead-up and during the 2005 general election. For the 2007 Northern Ireland Assembly election, he was the campaign manager for the party's three candidates in East Antrim, all of whom were elected.

Alastair Ross served in the Northern Ireland Assembly from 2007 until its collapse in 2017. He was re-elected in 2011 and 2016. Ross was a junior minister in the Executive Office of the Northern Ireland Assembly. He previously served on the Northern Ireland Policing Board, as well as being Chairman of the Assembly Committees for Justice, Standards and Privileges, as well as the ad hoc Ctte for the Mental Capacity Bill. He also served on the Environment, Education, Justice, Regional Development, Employment and Learning, and the ad hoc Committee on Sexual Offences Committees.

He was a member of the management committee of Lisnagarvey Hockey Club. His predecessor George Dawson, was one of the three DUP MLAs in East Antrim, and died shortly after the election. Ross was nominated by a closed list submitted by Dawson as his replacement.

Ross was described by the Belfast Newsletter as being "an unusually free-thinking DUP member with libertarian views" and was a regular media performer for the Party.

In 2017, he announced he wouldn’t be seeking re-election to the 2017 Assembly elections and will be quitting politics completely.

Following his retirement from politics, Ross was appointed by the UK Parliament as one of ten UK Electoral Commissioners.

Northern Ireland Assembly
Preceded by George Dawson	MLA for Antrim East; 2007–2017	Succeeded by John Stewart
Party political offices
Preceded by Emma Little Pengelly	Junior Minister; 2016–2017	Vacant Office suspended
