= John Stewart (Northern Ireland politician) =

Northern Irish politician (born 1983)

John Stewart MLA
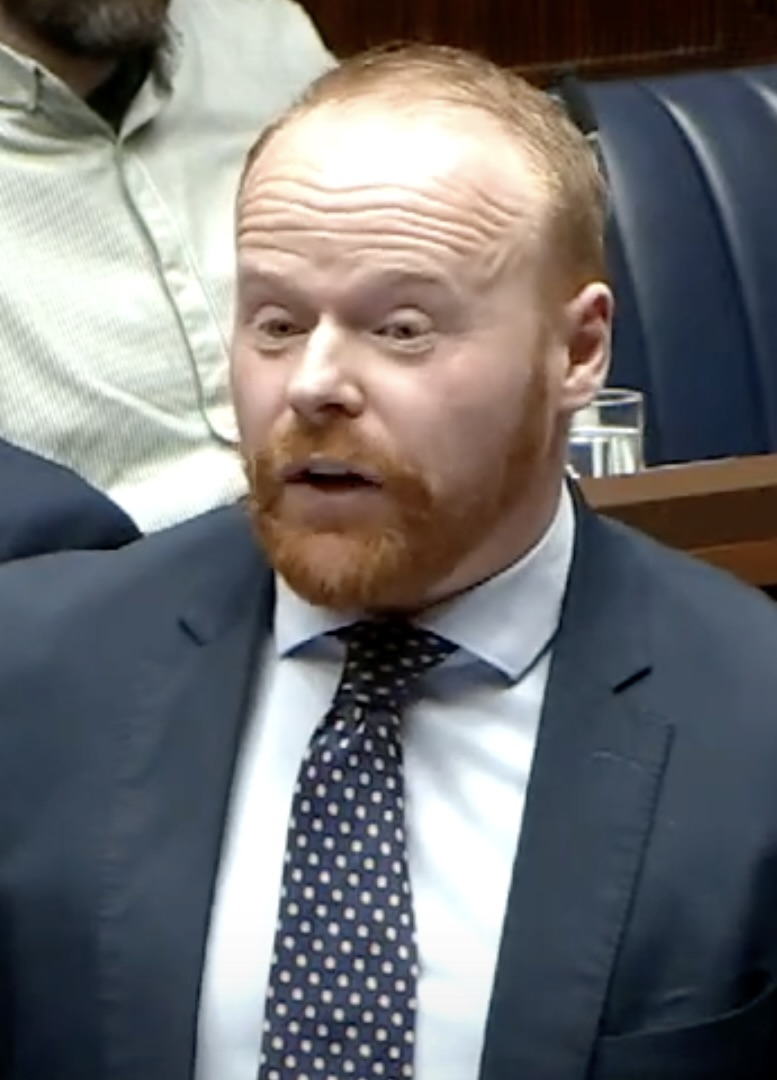
- Stewart in 2024

Deputy Chairperson of the Infrastructure Committee
- Incumbent
- Assumed office 6 February 2024

Ulster Unionist Chief Whip
- In office 25 May 2021 – April 2024
- Leader: Doug Beattie
- Preceded by: Robbie Butler
- Succeeded by: Robbie Butler

Ulster Unionist Party spokesperson for the Executive Office
- Incumbent
- Assumed office 25 May 2021
- Leader: Doug Beattie

Ulster Unionist Party spokesperson for Infrastructure
- Incumbent
- Assumed office 25 May 2021
- Leader: Doug Beattie

Member of the Northern Ireland Assembly for East Antrim
- Incumbent
- Assumed office 2 March 2017
- Preceded by: Alastair Ross

Member of Mid and East Antrim Borough Council
- In office 22 May 2014 – 2 March 2017
- Preceded by: Council established
- Succeeded by: Robin Stewart
- Constituency: Carrick Castle

Member of Carrickfergus Borough Council
- In office 5 May 2011 – 22 May 2014
- Preceded by: Roy Beggs Jr
- Succeeded by: Council abolished
- Constituency: Knockagh

Personal details
- Born: 9 April 1983 (age 43) Carrickfergus, Northern Ireland
- Party: Ulster Unionist Party
- Spouse: Deborah Stewart
- Children: 2
- Education: University of Cardiff
- Occupation: Politician
- Profession: Sales director

John Stewart (born 9 April 1983) is an Ulster Unionist Party (UUP) politician and businessman who has been a Member of the Northern Ireland Assembly (MLA) for East Antrim since 2017. Stewart is Deputy Chairperson of the Assembly's Infrastructure Committee.

== Early life and education ==
Stewart was born on 9 April 1983. He was educated at Carrickfergus Grammar School, a controlled grammar school in Carrickfergus, County Antrim, Northern Ireland. He studied history at Cardiff University, graduating with a Bachelor of Arts (BA) degree.

== Career ==
Before his election to the assembly, Stewart worked as the sales director of his family's business, Robinson's Shoemakers, which is based in Carrickfergus, County Antrim.

Stewart serves in the Army Reserve (formally known as the Territorial Army). He is a soldier of the North Irish Horse.

=== Political career ===
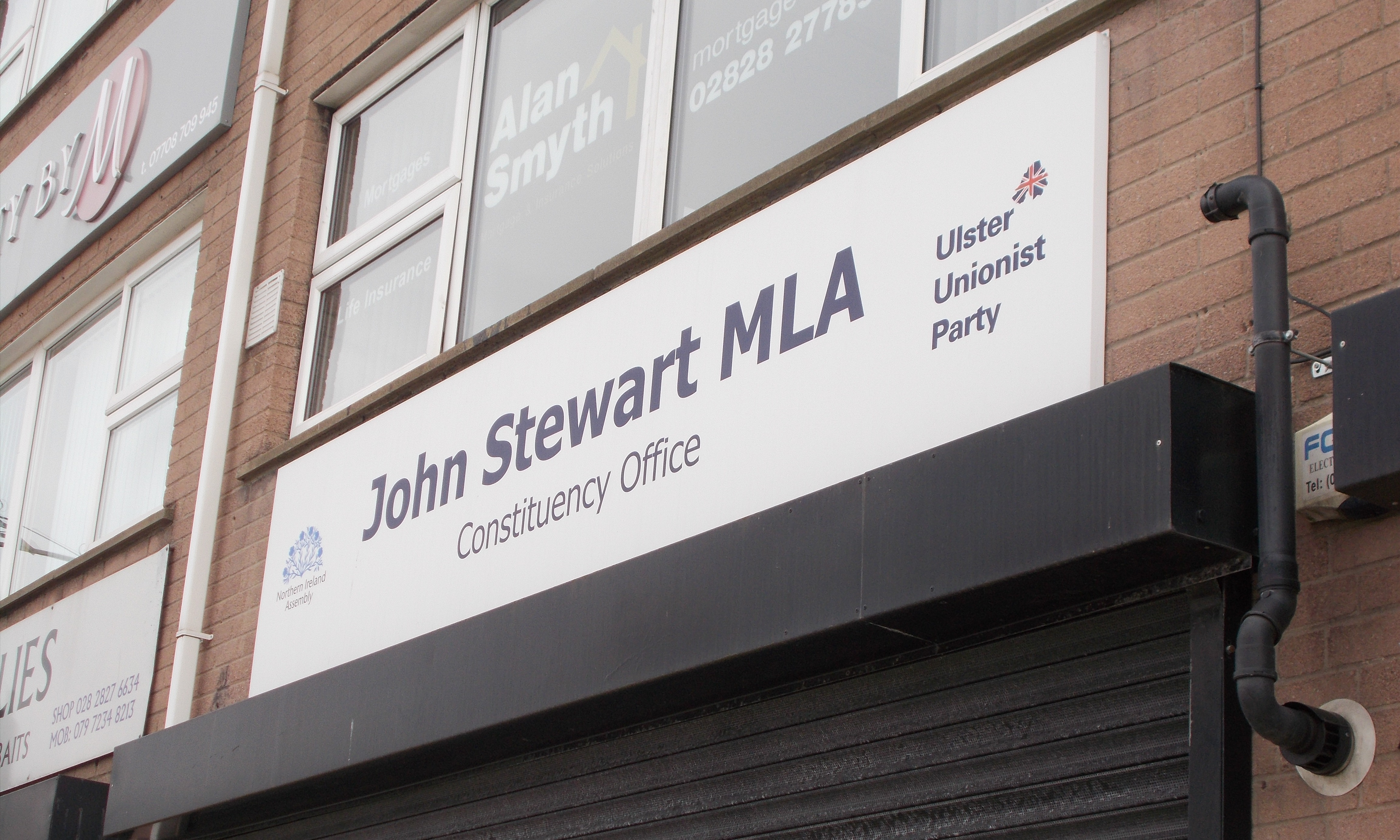
John Stewart MLA - Larne constituency office

Stewart joined the Ulster Unionist Party (UUP) in 2008. He was elected to Carrickfergus Borough Council in the 2011 local elections as a councillor for the Knockagh Monument electoral area. In 2014, he was elected to the newly created Mid and East Antrim Borough Council for Carrick Castle. He served as Deputy Mayor of Carrickfergus 2013–14.

On 2 March 2017, Stewart was elected to the Northern Ireland Assembly for East Antrim in stage 9 of the count. In the 2022 Assembly election, he polled 6195 votes and was re-elected after the third count.

Stewart is the Ulster Unionist Party's Infrastructure spokesperson. In August 2023, he called for action to tackle MoT waiting lists and outlined that the UUP would reuse the Temporary Exemption Certificates, used at the height of the pandemic, "to allow backlogs to be cleared and fines to be appealed."

On 24 August 2023, Stewart called for the Kilroot coal-powered power station to be kept open during the coming winter, this followed news that the gas turbines to replace coal would not be commissioned on time.

He ran as the UUP's candidate in East Antrim at the 2024 general election. In total, Stewart polled 9,476 votes (23.9%), a 7.3% increase.

== Personal life ==
Stewart is married to Deborah. He has two sons, Cohen and Harrison. He also has 2 office dogs Jaxon and Henry.

Northern Ireland Assembly
Preceded by Alastair Ross	MLA for East Antrim; 2017–present	Incumbent
