= Danny O'Connor (Northern Irish politician) =

Northern Irish politician

Member of Larne Borough Council
- In office 21 May 1997 – 5 May 2011
- Preceded by: Amelia Kelly
- Succeeded by: Oliver McMullan
- Constituency: Coast Road

Member of the Northern Ireland Assembly for East Antrim
- In office 25 June 1998 – 26 November 2003
- Preceded by: New Creation
- Succeeded by: George Dawson

Personal details
- Born: 1965 (age 60–61) Larne, Northern Ireland
- Party: Independent (2011–present)
- Other political affiliations: SDLP (1993–2011)

Danny O'Connor (born 1965) is an Irish former Social Democratic and Labour Party (SDLP) politician who was a Member of the Northern Ireland Assembly (MLA) for East Antrim from 1998 to 2003. He was also a Larne Borough Councillor for the Coast Road DEA from 1997 to 2011.

== Background ==
Born in Larne, O'Connor worked as a security guard in the Shorts factory in Belfast and also served in the Ulster Defence Regiment before being elected to Larne Borough Council, representing the Social Democratic and Labour Party (SDLP), in 1997. The same year, he stood for the party at the 1997 Westminster election in East Antrim, but received only 4.6% of the votes cast. He had joined the SDLP earlier in 1993 and helped found the party branch in Larne.

In 1996 he was an unsuccessful candidate in the Northern Ireland Forum election in East Antrim. O'Connor was elected for East Antrim at the 1998 Northern Ireland Assembly election. In 1999, his car was twice petrol-bombed, while his house and his brother's house were also attacked. He described it as part of a systematic loyalist campaign against Catholics in Larne. In 2000, he accused then Democratic Unionist Party councillor Jack McKee of raising tension in the Catholic Seacourt estate in Larne when McKee blamed republicans for targeting the estate's Protestant population. His home was attacked again in 2001, and in 2002, when he blamed the paramilitary Ulster Defence Association (UDA).

O'Connor stood again in the 2001 general election, increasing his share of the vote to 7.3%, but lost his Assembly seat at the 2003 election. In 2004, he fired warning shots when confronted by a group of men. While his mother claimed the group were UDA members, the British government concluded that there was "no evidence" of this.

He fell back to 5.3 percent of the vote at the 2005 general election. In 2006, he became the first nationalist Mayor of Larne. In 2007, he stood again for East Antrim, and was again unsuccessful.

In 2007, O'Connor was criticized for referring to a disabled colleague, DUP councillor Bobby McKee, as "stumpy". O'Connor subsequently apologised.

In the local council elections in 2011 standing in the Coast Road area of Larne Borough Council he lost his seat to Sinn Féin's Oliver McMullan. Later that year he resigned from the SDLP citing their support for civil partnerships as the reason for his departure.

During a 2012 interview O'Connor stated his future intention to vote for the DUP. Despite being at odds with his previous nationalism, O'Connor cites the DUP's policy on issues like abortion and gay rights as closer in line with his traditional Catholic beliefs than the SDLP or Sinn Féin's.

In May 2014 he stood unsuccessfully in the 2014 Mid and East Antrim District Council election as an independent. O'Connor said that he did not feel comfortable associating himself with any political party in Northern Ireland and was undeterred about standing as an independent. His election campaign would be low-key as he was suffering from arthritis and due to financial reasons.

Northern Ireland Assembly
New assembly	MLA for Antrim East; 1998–2003	Succeeded by George Dawson
Civic offices
Unknown	Mayor of Larne; 2006–2007	Succeeded by Mark Dunn
