= Thomas Robinson (Northern Ireland politician) =

Unionist politician from Northern Ireland (born 1950s)

Member of Larne Borough Council
- In office 15 May 1985 – 7 June 2001
- Preceded by: Seat created
- Succeeded by: Winston Fulton
- Constituency: Coast Road
- In office 18 May 1977 – 15 May 1985
- Preceded by: D. Harper
- Succeeded by: Seat abolished
- Constituency: Larne Area A

Member of the Northern Ireland Forum for East Antrim
- In office 30 May 1996 – 25 April 1998
- Preceded by: Forum created
- Succeeded by: Forum dissolved

Personal details
- Born: 1950-1951 Larne, Northern Ireland
- Party: TUV (2007 - present); Ulster Unionist (1977 - 2003)
- Other political affiliations: UK Unionist (2003 - 2007); Independent Unionist (2005)

Thomas Daniel Robinson (born 1950 or 1951), known as Tom Robinson, is a former Northern Irish unionist politician who was a Larne Borough Councillor for the Larne Area A DEA from 1977 to 1985, and then for the Coast Road DEA from 1985 to 2001, representing the Ulster Unionist Party (UUP) on both occasions.

== Background ==
Robinson worked as an independent financial advisor. He joined the Ulster Unionist Party, and was elected to Larne Borough Council at the 1977 Northern Ireland local elections. He held his seat in 1981, and was elected Deputy Mayor of Larne in 1982, then Mayor in 1983.

Robinson was elected for the Coast Road district at the local 1985, 1989, 1993 and 1997 local elections. He was also elected to the Northern Ireland Forum in 1996, representing East Antrim.

By 2000, Robinson had become a prominent critic of UUP leader David Trimble. He lost his council seat in 2001, and subsequently defected to the UK Unionist Party (UKUP). He stood for this new party at the 2003 Northern Ireland Assembly election, but took only 1.8% of the vote and was not elected.

Robinson stood again for Larne Borough Council at the 2005 local elections, this time as an independent candidate, but took only 57 votes and was again unsuccessful. He also failed to win a seat at the 2007 Northern Ireland Assembly election, standing again for the UKUP, and subsequently joined the Traditional Unionist Voice party.

Civic offices
Preceded by Roy Beggs	Mayor of Larne; 1983–1984	Succeeded by Jack McKee
Northern Ireland Forum
New forum	Member for East Antrim; 1996–1998	Forum dissolved
