= 1985 Larne Borough Council election =

Local government election in Northern Ireland

← 1981	15 May 1985	1989 →

All 15 seats to Larne Borough Council 8 seats needed for a majority
	First party	Second party	Third party
Party	DUP	UUP	Alliance
Seats won	6	6	2
Seat change	0	▲2	▼1
	Fourth party	Fifth party
Party	Ind. Nationalist	United Loyalist
Seats won	1	0
Seat change	0	▼1

Elections to Larne Borough Council were held on 15 May 1985 on the same day as the other Northern Irish local government elections. The election used three district electoral areas to elect a total of 15 councillors.

== Election results ==
Larne Borough Council Election Result 1985
Party	Seats	Gains	Losses	Net gain/loss	Seats %	Votes %	Votes	+/−
DUP	6	0	0	0	40.0	39.4	4,289	▲2.2
UUP	6	2	0	▲2	46.7	37.3	4,057	▲13.1
Alliance	2	0	1	▼1	13.3	16.4	1,773	▼1.0
Ind. Nationalist	1	0	0	0	6.7	6.9	755	▼0.6

Note: "Votes" are the first preference votes.

== Districts summary ==
Results of the Larne Borough Council election, 1985 by district
Ward	%	Cllrs	%	Cllrs	%	Cllrs	%	Cllrs	Total Cllrs
Ward	DUP		UUP		Alliance		Others		Total Cllrs
Coast Road	36.7	2	28.9	1	12.9	1	21.5	1	5
Larne Lough	40.4	2	50.0	3	9.6	0	0.0	0	5
Larne Town	41.1	2	32.6	2	26.3	1	0.0	0	5
Total	39.4	6	37.3	6	16.4	2	6.9	1	15

== District results ==
=== Coast Road ===
1985: 2 x DUP, 1 x UUP, 1 x Alliance, 1 x Independent Nationalist

Coast Road - 5 seats
Party	Candidate	FPv%	Count			
Party	Candidate	FPv%	1	2	3	4
UUP	Thomas Robinson*	22.25%	782			
Ind. Nationalist	William Cunning*	21.48%	755			
DUP	Winston Fulton*	18.07%	635			
Alliance	Amelia Kelly	12.94%	455	468.75	629.57	
DUP	Rachel Rea*	13.97%	491	533.75	535.04	674.04
UUP	Samuel Martin	6.66%	234	356.25	360.12	371.12
DUP	Hill Taggart	4.64%	163	175	175.86	
Electorate: 6,875 Valid: 3,515 (51.13%) Spoilt: 82 Quota: 586 Turnout: 3,597 (52.32%)

=== Larne Lough ===
1985: 3 x UUP, 2 x DUP

Larne Lough - 5 seats
Party	Candidate	FPv%	Count			
Party	Candidate	FPv%	1	2	3	4
UUP	Roy Beggs*	27.69%	1,020			
DUP	John Alexander*	18.41%	678			
UUP	Laurence Niblock*	12.92%	476	596.4	597.48	703.48
UUP	Thomas Baxter	9.42%	347	547.8	553.47	657.47
DUP	Samuel McAllister*	13.33%	491	522.6	547.44	567.73
DUP	Gary Haggan	8.69%	320	351.2	379.73	389.22
Alliance	Thomas Benson*	9.53%	351	371.8	372.16	
Electorate: 6,568 Valid: 3,683 (56.07%) Spoilt: 96 Quota: 614 Turnout: 3,779 (57.54%)

=== Larne Town ===
1985: 2 x UUP, 2 x DUP, 1 x Alliance

Larne Town - 5 seats
Party	Candidate	FPv%	Count		
Party	Candidate	FPv%	1	2	3
DUP	Jack McKee*	37.41%	1,375		
Alliance	Liam Kelly*	26.31%	967		
UUP	Robert Robinson*	20.92%	769		
DUP	Leonard Sluman*	2.35%	94	671.36	
UUP	Rosalie Armstrong*	9.36%	344	402.24	670.91
UUP	Thomas Lamrock	2.31%	85	111.32	185.69
DUP	Frederick Hoey	1.14%	42	134.4	143.11
Electorate: 7,289 Valid: 3,676 (50.43%) Spoilt: 87 Quota: 613 Turnout: 3,763 (51.63%)
