= Jack McKee =

Northern Irish unionist politician

Jack Mckee

Member of Larne Borough Council
- In office 15 May 1985 – 22 May 2014
- Preceded by: District created
- Succeeded by: Council abolished
- Constituency: Larne Town
- In office 30 May 1973 – 15 May 1985
- Preceded by: Seat created
- Succeeded by: Seat abolished
- Constituency: Larne Area C

Member of the Northern Ireland Forum for East Antrim
- In office 30 May 1996 – 25 April 1998

Member of the Northern Ireland Assembly for North Antrim
- In office 20 October 1982 – 1986
- Preceded by: Assembly re-established
- Succeeded by: Assembly abolished

Personal details
- Born: 4 September 1943 Larne, Northern Ireland
- Died: 4 October 2015 (aged 72) Larne, Northern Ireland
- Party: Traditional Unionist Voice (2007 - 2015); Democratic Unionist Party (1971 - 2003; 2005 - 2007)
- Other political affiliations: Independent Unionist (2003 - 2005); Loyalist (1973)

Jack McKee (4 September 1943 – 4 October 2015) was a Northern Irish unionist politician who served as a Larne Borough Councillor for the Larne Area C DEA from 1973 to 1985, and then for Larne Town from 1985 to 2014.

A founding member of the Democratic Unionist Party (DUP), McKee defected to the newly-formed Traditional Unionist Voice (TUV) in 2007, after disagreeing with his former party’s decision to form a power-sharing executive with Sinn Féin.

== Early life ==
McKee was born in the port town of Larne on 4 September 1943 as the third of three children to a working-class family with Ellen and Robert as parents. He attended the local schools Inver Primary and Greenland Secondary leaving as soon as he could. He showed little interest in studies. Upon leaving school he found employment in various engineering jobs in Larne.

== Political career ==
McKee's interest in politics was sparked by the television appearance of Ian Paisley in a debate at the Oxford Union in the 1960s. Upon later attending one of Paisley's rallies in Larne he met his future wife Joan, and subsequently became Paisley's election agent and helping the DUP campaign in the area.

He first gained election in 1973 to Larne Borough Council upon its creation. He was one of the longest-serving councillors on Larne Borough Council; like the Ulster Unionist Party's Roy Beggs, he served continuously since the council was formed in 1973, until local government was reformed in 2014.

Resigning from the DUP in 2007 in protest at the DUP's decision to enter government with Sinn Féin, he joined the Traditional Unionist Voice. This act from the DUP made him "sick to his stomach". Every council election he ran in the Larne Lough electoral district. He was also elected to the Northern Ireland Forum in 1996 and the Northern Ireland Assembly in 1982.

At an anti-Good Friday Agreement protest in Antrim in April 1998 McKee shared a platform with then fellow DUP member Sammy Wilson and Kenneth Peeples, a leader of the Orange Volunteers and Protestant fundamentalist, who burned a copy of the agreement. In 2000 he was accused by fellow Larne councillor and Social Democratic and Labour Party member Danny O'Connor of raising tensions in the Catholic Seacourt estate by claiming Irish republicans were targeting the minority Ulster Protestant population in the estate.

He served as Mayor of Larne in 1984–85, and as leader of the DUP group on Larne Borough Council for many years from 1981.

McKee cited heavy-handed policing by the Police Service of Northern Ireland (PSNI) at loyalist protests as the reason for his resignation from the local District Policing Partnership. He was critical of the PSNI's handling of the 2012-2013 Northern Ireland protests near the sectarian interface at Short Strand, where he claimed republicans attacked loyalist protesters without police intervention.

In 2015 McKee objected to the construction of a memorial to former residents of Islandmagee, who had been convicted of witchcraft on the grounds that he "remained to be convinced that the women were not guilty of Satanic practices".

Jack McKee was a founder member of Larne Free Presbyterian church, a church which he attended faithfully right up to his death.

He was a member of the Orange Order.

== Death ==
McKee died at the age of 72 on 4 October 2015, from infective exacerbated pulmonary fibrosis, the same illness which killed his father. His funeral was held at Larne Free Presbyterian Church and his body buried in the town cemetery.

TUV leader Jim Allister described McKee as "fearless in his defence of unionism and unafraid to often stand alone, it was a great privilege to have him as a TUV councillor". Former DUP colleague Sammy Wilson called him a "dedicated public servant" and despite their political differences they maintained a cordial relationship. Sinn Féin councillor James McKeown, while acknowledging his death would be a loss to his community and Larne in general, stated he was an "uncompromising loyalist through and through" and never fully supportive of the steps Larne took to change its image.

McKee was survived by his wife, two children and six grandchildren.

Northern Ireland Assembly (1982)
New assembly	MPA for North Antrim; 1982–1986	Assembly abolished
Northern Ireland Forum
New forum	Member for East Antrim; 1996–1998	Forum dissolved
Civic offices
Preceded by Tom Robinson	Mayor of Larne; 1978–1983	Unknown
