= Sammy Wilson (politician) =

Northern Irish politician (born 1952)

The Right Honourable Sammy Wilson MP
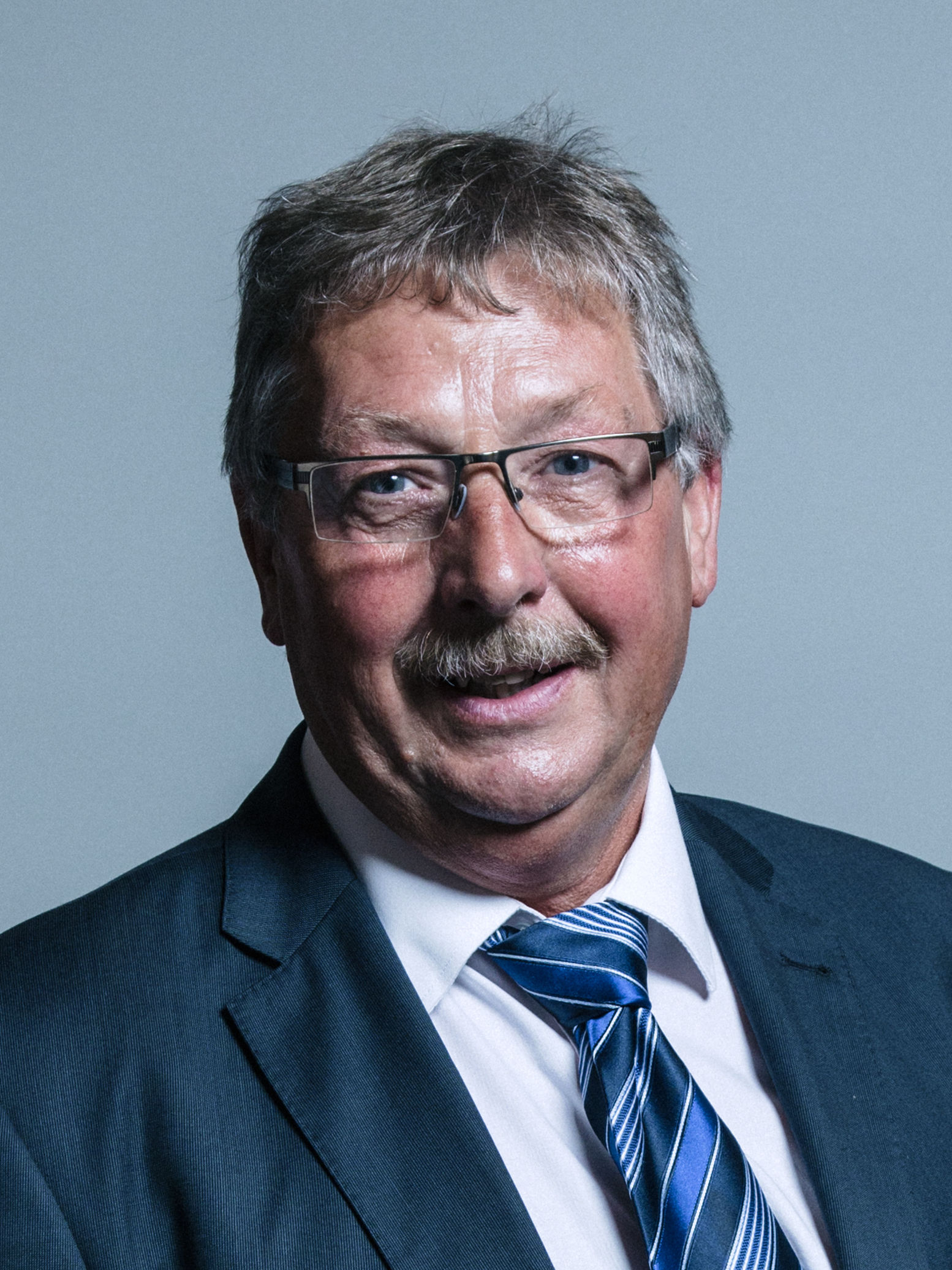
- Official portrait, 2017

Democratic Unionist Party Chief Whip in the House of Commons
- Incumbent
- Assumed office 17 December 2019
- Leader: Jeffrey Donaldson; Gavin Robinson
- Preceded by: Jeffrey Donaldson

Minister of Finance and Personnel
- In office 1 July 2009 – 29 July 2013
- First Minister: Peter Robinson
- Preceded by: Nigel Dodds
- Succeeded by: Simon Hamilton

Minister of the Environment
- In office 9 June 2008 – 1 July 2009
- First Minister: Peter Robinson
- Preceded by: Arlene Foster
- Succeeded by: Edwin Poots
Parliamentary offices
Member of Parliament for East Antrim
Incumbent
Assumed office 5 May 2005
Preceded by	Roy Beggs
Majority	1,305 (3.3%)
Member of the Legislative Assembly
In office 26 November 2003 – 11 August 2015
Preceded by	Roger Hutchinson
Succeeded by	Gordon Lyons
Constituency	East Antrim
In office 25 June 1998 – 26 November 2003
Preceded by	Office established
Succeeded by	Robin Newton
Constituency	Belfast East
Northern Ireland Forum Member for Belfast East
In office 30 May 1996 – 25 April 1998
Preceded by	New forum
Succeeded by	Forum dissolved
Local government offices
43rd and 57th Lord Mayor of Belfast
In office 1 June 2000 – 1 June 2001
Deputy	Frank McCoubrey
Preceded by	Bob Stoker
Succeeded by	Jim Rodgers
In office 1 June 1986 – 1 June 1987
Deputy	Dixie Gilmore
Preceded by	John Carson
Succeeded by	J. J. Dixon Gilmore
Member of Belfast City Council
In office 15 May 1985 – 1 March 2010
Preceded by	District created
Succeeded by	Gavin Robinson
Constituency	Pottinger
In office 20 May 1981 – 15 May 1985
Preceded by	Alasdair McDonnell
Succeeded by	District abolished
Constituency	Belfast Area A

Personal details
- Born: 4 April 1953 Belfast, Northern Ireland
- Party: Democratic Unionist
- Education: Queen's University Belfast

Samuel Wilson (born 4 April 1953) is a British politician who has served as Chief Whip of the Democratic Unionist Party (DUP) in the House of Commons since 2019. Wilson has served as the Member of Parliament (MP) for East Antrim since 2005.

He was returned to Parliament in the 2024 United Kingdom general election in Northern Ireland with a reduced majority (down to 1,306) and a 13% reduction in his share of the vote.

Wilson served as a Member of the Legislative Assembly (MLA) for Belfast East from 1998 to 2003 and for East Antrim from 2003 until 2015. He served as Lord Mayor of Belfast from 1986 to 1987 and again from 2000 to 2001, the first person from the DUP to hold the office. He has also served as Minister of Finance and Personnel and Minister of the Environment in the Northern Ireland Executive.

== Personal life ==
Samuel Wilson was born on 4 April 1953 in Belfast, Northern Ireland, the son of Alexander (Sandy) Wilson, pastor of Elim Pentecostal Church in Bangor. Both of his parents had Alzheimer's disease. He was educated at Methodist College in Belfast, and then went on to study economics and politics at both Queen's University of Belfast and Stranmillis University College. Wilson's first job was a teaching post at Grosvenor Grammar School. He later became the head of economics at the school, and also served as Assistant Chief Examiner for A-Level Economics for the CCEA exam board in Northern Ireland.

In May 1996, the Sunday World published a series of candid holiday photographs showing Wilson and his girlfriend naked. Wilson subsequently sued the paper for damages, which were settled out of court. Two years after the incident, at the inaugural sitting of the Northern Ireland Assembly, Martin McGuinness of Sinn Féin addressed the Assembly by saying "It is also very good to come across someone like Mr Sammy Wilson, whom I have never met, and it is great to see him today with his clothes on."

== Political career ==
=== DUP Press Officer ===
Wilson began his political life as the Democratic Unionist Party's Press Officer. He served as Press Officer from 1982 to 1996. In 1981, he was elected as a DUP councillor to Belfast City Council, a position that he held until March 2010. Through his membership of the city council, Wilson became the first person from the DUP to serve as Lord Mayor of Belfast in 1986 / 1987. Wilson aroused controversy as a DUP councillor in June 1985 when he issued a threat to Ulsterbus vehicles and staff after it refused to transport unionists to a demonstration in Castlewellan, which ended in violence. Wilson said "it now seems that the Northern Ireland office has enlisted not only the RUC but the transport industry in its offensive against the Unionist population. Such a move can place Ulsterbus vehicles and drivers in an extremely vulnerable position." In August 1986, while Lord Mayor of Belfast, Wilson said his party had no difficulty in working alongside the paramilitary Ulster Defence Association (UDA). The following day Social Democratic and Labour Party MP Seamus Mallon accused Wilson of supporting random killings, intimidations and "other outrages". Wilson stood in East Belfast at the 1982 Assembly election but was not elected. In June 1991, during a heated council meeting where Nigel Dodds was installed as mayor, Wilson congratulated those who had "rid Ireland over the last month of those who have politically or militarily supported [the IRA]", referring to the death of three IRA men in an SAS ambush in County Tyrone and the assassination of Sinn Féin councillor Eddie Fullerton by the UDA. He first contested a seat for Parliament in 1992, when he stood for Strangford, but came second with 23% of the vote. In September 1993 the day after the UDA (under its "Ulster Freedom Fighters" cover name) claimed responsibility for firebomb attacks on several Gaelic Athletic Association (GAA) premises, Wilson described the GAA as "the IRA at play".

Wilson chaired a rally in Ulster Hall in November 1986 declaring the founding of a new loyalist paramilitary group, Ulster Resistance. The event was addressed by DUP party colleagues Ian Paisley, Peter Robinson and Ivan Foster. After a large arms cache linked to Ulster Resistance was discovered in County Armagh in November 1988, Wilson told the Sunday Tribune that he "[defended] the right of Unionist people to resist" and "Ulster Resistance are doing no more and no less than Lord Edward Carson." Wilson refused to say when he had last been in contact with Ulster Resistance. In January 1992 at a meeting of Belfast City Council, Sinn Féin councillor Máirtín Ó Muilleoir accused Wilson of involvement in the formation of Ulster Resistance; Wilson reportedly shouted back "I'm proud of it."

In September 1988 Sammy Wilson was named in a Canadian court as having hosted Canada-based gunrunners in Belfast City Hall in October 1986 when he was Lord Mayor. It was also claimed that in Wilson's City Hall sitting room the Canadian arms traffickers met two prominent loyalist paramilitary figures. Wilson left the room shortly before the loyalists entered and was absent for this second meeting. One of the Canadians, Howard Wright, was convicted of illegally exporting firearms to the Ulster Volunteer Force (UVF) between 1979 and 1986. Another Canadian man named during the trial, Bill Taylor, was imprisoned in Canada on an extradition warrant for charges of conspiring to import arms into the United Kingdom.

In January 1994, the UDA released a document calling for ethnic cleansing and repartition of Ireland, with the goal of making Northern Ireland wholly Protestant. The plan was to be implemented should the British Army withdraw from Northern Ireland. Some areas with strong Catholic/nationalist majorities near the Irish border would be handed over to the Republic of Ireland, and those Catholics left stranded in the "Protestant state" would be "expelled, nullified, or interned". Controversially, Wilson called the plan a "very valuable return to reality". He added: "[it] shows that some loyalist paramilitaries are looking ahead and contemplating what needs to be done to maintain our separate Ulster identity".

In April 1994 amidst controversy over a large-scale operation to overhaul the security forces base in the predominantly nationalist village of Crossmaglen, County Armagh, acting as DUP press officer Wilson commented

Unionists should be heartened that, despite the pressure from Dublin, the SDLP and the Catholic Church, there is still some will to make republican communities pay some of the cost of their support for IRA terrorism... The people of Crossmaglen have given support to the IRA and deserve every inconvenience they are now suffering as a result.

In July 1994, Wilson and DUP MP Peter Robinson were pallbearers at the funeral of UDA member Ray Smallwoods, who served half of a 15 year sentence for the attempted murder of Bernadette McAliskey in 1981.

=== MLA for East Belfast ===
In May 1996, Wilson was elected to the Northern Ireland Forum for the constituency of East Belfast and went on to represent this area in the Northern Ireland Assembly upon its creation in June 1998. The DUP were opposed to the Good Friday Agreement and in March 1998 Wilson and fellow DUP politician Ian Paisley Jr gave speeches at a rally in Portadown organised by the paramilitary Loyalist Volunteer Force (LVF), who were also opposed to the ongoing talks process. Their appearance was widely criticised; days earlier the LVF had murdered two men, Philip Allen and Damien Trainor - one a Protestant, one a Catholic - in a bar in Poyntzpass, County Armagh in an indiscriminate sectarian attack. On 24 April 1998, Sammy Wilson and DUP councillor Jack McKee shared a platform with self-styled pastor Clifford Peeples, a member of the LVF and leader of the Orange Volunteers, at an anti-Good Friday Agreement rally in Antrim town. Peeples set a print copy of the Good Friday Agreement alight as attendees cried 'And burn Fenians too'. Police believed the Antrim-based Loyalists who murdered Catholic Ciaran Heffran in Crumlin several hours later attended the rally.

Wilson again served as Lord Mayor of Belfast between June 2000 and June 2001. During his time as Mayor, the Andersonstown News set up a website to highlight Wilson's "naked sectarianism". The site included such quotes from Wilson as: "The GAA is the sporting wing of the IRA"; "I don't care if [gays] are ratepayers. As far as I am concerned they are perverts"; "Taigs don't pay rates"; and "They [Sinn Féin voters in the Oldpark area of Belfast] are sub-human animals". The Andersonstown News had challenged Wilson to take legal action if he felt he was being misrepresented. He did not. The website voluntarily shut down when he ended his tenure as Mayor.

=== MLA and MP for East Antrim ===
In the 2003 Assembly election, Wilson stood successfully in the East Antrim constituency, alongside fellow DUP candidates George Dawson and David Hilditch. This momentum was carried through to the 2005 Westminster Election on 5 May, which saw Wilson defeat Roy Beggs of the Ulster Unionist Party, to become Member of Parliament for East Antrim with 49.6% of the vote.

Wilson is a former member of the Northern Ireland Policing Board and Northern Ireland Housing Council.

In his role as DUP education spokesman, Wilson was one of the most vocal critics of Education Minister Caitríona Ruane's plan to abolish academic selection and introduce a comprehensive school system in Northern Ireland.

He resigned from his position as chair of the Education Committee when he took up his role as Minister for the Environment.

In March 2016, during a BBC Spotlight episode discussing the implications of the EU referendum, Wilson was recorded agreeing with a member of the public who said that they wanted to leave the European Union and "get the ethnics out". Wilson stated: "You are absolutely right". Wilson said he was agreeing with the desire to leave the European Union, not the "ethnics out" call. Wilson was criticised by the Polish consul in Northern Ireland and various other political parties.

In July 2016, he called breastfeeding in the House of Commons chamber "voyeuristic" and said: "To me, anyone who chooses to do it in the chamber rather than who do it in the quietness of their office, is doing it for reasons other than simply feeding the child, to make a point".

On 25 February 2017, he was interviewed by American broadcaster PBS in which he claimed there "has always been an affiliation between the Irish republicans and terrorist groups, especially in the Middle East". He also commented that he agreed with the message behind an Ulster loyalist mural which equated the IRA and Sinn Féin to the Islamic State of Iraq and the Levant.

In 2018, he argued against the suspension of his party colleague Ian Paisley Jr from the Westminster Parliament, after he was punished for accepting family holidays paid for by the government of Sri Lanka while speaking in favour of the regime in the House of Commons.

In March 2019, Wilson was one of 21 MPs who voted against LGBT inclusive sex and relationship education in English schools.

Wilson was photographed on the London Underground without a face mask amid the COVID-19 pandemic in September 2020.

=== Minister for the Environment (2008–2009) ===
On 9 June 2008, Wilson joined the Northern Ireland Executive as Minister of the Environment.

His appointment and tenure as Environment Minister were criticised by some environmental groups. Wilson rejects the scientific consensus on climate change. He has stated that man-made climate change is a "myth based on dodgy science". Wilson says that "reasoned debate must replace the scaremongering of the green climate alarmists" and "resources should be used to adapt to the consequences of climate change, rather than King Canute-style vainly trying to stop it". This, along with his opposition to the creation of an independent environmental protection agency and his support for nuclear power, led the Green Party to condemn Wilson's "deeply irresponsible message" and give him the 'Green Wash' award for being the MLA most likely to damage the environment. Wilson's beliefs on climate change have been likened to "a cigarette salesman denying that smoking causes cancer" by John Woods of Friends of the Earth, who added that "Ironically, if we listen to him Northern Ireland will suffer economically as we are left behind by smarter regions who are embracing the low carbon economy of the future".

Wilson came under renewed criticism in February 2009 when he blocked the broadcast of climate change advertisements on television, calling them part of an "insidious propaganda campaign". He also stated "that future ecological messages could only be promoted in Northern Ireland with his permission". New Scientist magazine stated that despite the minister's comments, "the overwhelming majority of scientists do agree that there is a greater than 90% chance that the rate at which we burn fossil fuels is driving climate change".

=== Minister for Finance and Personnel (2009–2013) ===
In the June 2009 Executive reshuffle, Wilson became Minister of Finance and Personnel. He was praised by First Minister Peter Robinson, who said that Wilson was the "most qualified Finance Minister that Northern Ireland has had in decades".

In August 2009, Wilson was the subject of criticism from the Northern Ireland Council for Ethnic Minorities for saying that "jobs should go to people born in Northern Ireland before going to economic migrants". Following racist attacks on Romanian people in Belfast, Wilson commented that "charges of racism were always coincided with the holding out of the hand for more money". The Northern Ireland Assembly Standards Committee dismissed complaints made against him over these remarks.

Wilson's tenure as Finance Minister coincided with the worst recession in the history of Northern Ireland. He criticised banks in Northern Ireland for not increasing lending to businesses. Wilson was commended for displaying leadership and received cross-party support for stopping bonuses to civil servants during the recession.

Wilson was replaced as Finance Minister in July 2013 by DUP colleague Simon Hamilton, in a planned reshuffle.

=== Chief Whip ===
In December 2019, when Jeffrey Donaldson took over as the DUP leader in the House of Commons, Wilson was elected Chief Whip of the party at Westminster, replacing Donaldson.

In February 2024, Wilson stepped down as Chief Whip. He revealed in March 2024 that he stepped down from the role as he could not force members to vote for policies that he did not agree with. Speaking to View From Stormont, he said, “I have reservations about some of the things that the party has agreed with the Government and I felt it was inappropriate for me to be in a position where I was asking people to make sure they do toe the party line, while on occasion I may be saying something different from what the party is saying.”

In October 2024, he returned as the party's Chief Whip at Westminster, without comment from himself or the DUP.

== Brexit position ==
On 9 February 2016, during a debate in the House of Commons regarding the upcoming Brexit referendum, Wilson gave his support to the UK government holding a referendum, as he wanted to "break down the walls of the prison in which we have been held for the last 40-odd years. In that time, we have been robbed of our money, our fishing grounds have been violated, our farmers have been destroyed and the EU Court of Justice has run over the rights of victims while upholding those of terrorists". Shortly after this statement, Arlene Foster formally announced the Democratic Unionist Party's intention to campaign for a "Leave" vote in the Brexit referendum.

In reply to a 2016 UK Treasury report that highlighted the negative economic impact of the United Kingdom leaving the European Union, with specific reference to the economy of Northern Ireland, Wilson accused the Chancellor of the Exchequer, George Osborne of "resorting to ever increasingly desperate tactics", adding "To suggest that any economic model can predict what our economy let alone the EU and world economy will look like in 14 years time is totally dishonest".

As the DUP's Brexit spokesman, Wilson said in January 2019 it was "perfectly possible" that Theresa May would be able to negotiate a revised withdrawal agreement which removes the Northern Ireland backstop.

On 29 January 2019, during a debate in the House of Commons, Wilson responded to a suggestion from Scottish National Party MP Ian Blackford that a no-deal Brexit could lead to food shortages and that many supermarkets "warn of not having sufficient supplies and of shelves lying empty", by saying people could simply "Go to the chippy" instead. DUP MP Gavin Robinson later said that the remark should "not be taken too seriously", but Caroline Lucas of the Green Party of England and Wales, said the DUP should be "ashamed".

However, on 11 January 2021, during an Economic Update from the Chancellor of the Exchequer Rishi Sunak in the House of Commons, Wilson complained that in Northern Ireland "supermarket shelves are empty and thousands of people are being sent letters from suppliers in England saying that neither they personally nor their businesses will any longer be supplied with goods" as a direct result of Brexit.

In June 2025, Wilson had to dismisses claims he was a supporter of the Windsor Framework after he had posted on Twitter about promoting Northern Ireland's dual market access to the Indian High Commissioner during a trade conference.

== LGBT+ rights ==
In a 1 June 1992 Daily Express article, Wilson was quoted as saying "They are poofs. I don't care if they are ratepayers. As far as I am concerned they are perverts" after gay rights activists had requested the use of Belfast City Hall.

Wilson has voted against legislation allowing same-sex marriage in both the mainland UK in 2013 and Northern Ireland in 2019.

In November 2016, while responding to a letter from a constituent, Wilson refused to support World AIDS Day as he felt the UK government had exhausted considerable resources on dealing with AIDS at the expense of other illnesses which were "not always as a result of lifestyle choices and which therefore deserve higher priorities". A subsequent statement by Chief Executive of the UK National AIDS Trust Deborah Gold asserted that the "misinformed response" from Wilson was the result of "prejudice".

In March 2021, responding to an email from a constituent about gay conversion therapy, Wilson stated “I feel that those who wish to avail themselves of conversion therapy and those who wish to practice it should be allowed to do so". A DUP spokesperson later moved to clarify Wilson’s comments by stating "while the practice is not something he would support; it is not for him to dictate to others the services they seek out".

== Climate change denial ==
Despite once serving as the Environment Minister for Northern Ireland, Wilson has described environmentalism as "hysterical pseudo-religion". In 2009, Wilson blocked 'Act on CO_{2}' television and radio campaign adverts (urging people to reduce their carbon output and use less energy in the home) from being broadcast in Northern Ireland, saying he would not allow this "insidious New Labour propaganda campaign" to be imposed on the public. Furthermore, Wilson said he wrote to the UK Department of Energy and Climate Change to say that the Act on CO_{2} campaign "was not welcome", was contrary to his personal views, and that he did "not wish for climate change messages to be promoted by other Whitehall departments here". He has also warned that future ecological messages could only be promoted in Northern Ireland with his permission.

Northern Ireland Forum
New forum	Member for East Belfast; 1996–1998	Forum dissolved
Northern Ireland Assembly
New assembly	Member of the Legislative Assembly for Belfast East; 1998–2003	Succeeded by Robin Newton
Preceded by Roger Hutchinson	Member of the Legislative Assembly for East Antrim; 2003–2015	Succeeded by Gordon Lyons
Parliament of the United Kingdom
Preceded by Roy Beggs	Member of Parliament for East Antrim; 2005–present	Incumbent
Civic offices
Preceded by John Carson	Lord Mayor of Belfast; 1986–1987	Succeeded by John J. D. Gilmore
Preceded by Bob Stoker	Lord Mayor of Belfast; 2000–2001	Succeeded by Jim Rodgers
Political offices
Preceded by Arlene Foster	Minister of the Environment; 2008–2009	Succeeded by Edwin Poots
Preceded by Nigel Dodds	Minister of Finance and Personnel; 2009–2013	Succeeded by Simon Hamilton
