= East Antrim (Assembly constituency) =

Constituency of the Northern Ireland Assembly

Coordinates: 54.845°N 5.811°W

- Constituency for the Northern Ireland Assembly
- East Antrim shown within Northern Ireland

Current Constituency
- Created: 1996
- Seats: 6 (1996–2016); 5 (2017–)
- MLAs: Cheryl Brownlee (DUP); Stewart Dickson (APNI); Danny Donnelly (APNI); Gordon Lyons (DUP); John Stewart (UUP)
- Districts: Mid and East Antrim Borough Council; Antrim and Newtownabbey Borough Council

Map of current boundaries

East Antrim is a constituency in the Northern Ireland Assembly.

The seat was first used for a Northern Ireland-only election for the Northern Ireland Forum in 1996. Since 1998, it has elected members to the current Assembly.

For Assembly elections prior to 1996, the constituency was largely part of the North Antrim and South Antrim constituencies. From 1997 to 2010 it shared boundaries with the East Antrim UK Parliament constituency; this link was broken by the 2010 Westminster General Election but was restored at the 2011 Assembly elections.

For further details of the history and boundaries of the constituency, see East Antrim (UK Parliament constituency).

== Members ==
Election	MLA (party)	MLA (party)	MLA (party)	MLA (party)	MLA (party)	MLA (party)
1996	Seán Neeson (Alliance Party)	Thomas Robinson (UUP)	May Steele (UUP)	May Beattie (DUP)	Jack McKee (DUP)	5 seats 1996–1998
1998	Seán Neeson (Alliance Party)	Ken Robinson (UUP)	Roy Beggs Jr (UUP)	Roger Hutchinson (UKUP)	David Hilditch (DUP)	Danny O'Connor (SDLP)
2003	Seán Neeson (Alliance Party)	Ken Robinson (UUP)	Roy Beggs Jr (UUP)	Sammy Wilson (DUP)	David Hilditch (DUP)	George Dawson (DUP)
2007	Seán Neeson (Alliance Party)	Ken Robinson (UUP)	Roy Beggs Jr (UUP)	Sammy Wilson (DUP)	David Hilditch (DUP)	George Dawson (DUP)
May 2007 co-option	Seán Neeson (Alliance Party)	Ken Robinson (UUP)	Roy Beggs Jr (UUP)	Sammy Wilson (DUP)	David Hilditch (DUP)	Alastair Ross (DUP)
2011	Stewart Dickson (Alliance Party)	Oliver McMullan (Sinn Féin)	Roy Beggs Jr (UUP)	Sammy Wilson (DUP)	David Hilditch (DUP)	Alastair Ross (DUP)
August 2015 co-option	Stewart Dickson (Alliance Party)	Oliver McMullan (Sinn Féin)	Roy Beggs Jr (UUP)	Gordon Lyons (DUP)	David Hilditch (DUP)	Alastair Ross (DUP)
2016	Stewart Dickson (Alliance Party)	Oliver McMullan (Sinn Féin)	Roy Beggs Jr (UUP)	Gordon Lyons (DUP)	David Hilditch (DUP)	Alastair Ross (DUP)
2017	Stewart Dickson (Alliance Party)	John Stewart (UUP)	Roy Beggs Jr (UUP)	Gordon Lyons (DUP)	David Hilditch (DUP)	5 seats 2017–present
2022	Stewart Dickson (Alliance Party)	John Stewart (UUP)	Danny Donnelly (Alliance Party)	Gordon Lyons (DUP)	David Hilditch (DUP)	5 seats 2017–present
September 2023 co-option	Stewart Dickson (Alliance Party)	John Stewart (UUP)	Danny Donnelly (Alliance Party)	Gordon Lyons (DUP)	Cheryl Brownlee (DUP)	5 seats 2017–present

Note: The columns in this table are used only for presentational purposes, and no significance should be attached to the order of columns. For details of the order in which seats were won at each election, see the detailed results of that election.

== Elections ==
=== Northern Ireland Assembly ===
==== 2027 ====
2027 Assembly election: East Antrim – 5 seats
Party	Candidate	FPv%	Count
Party	Candidate	FPv%	1
Alliance	Stewart Dickson		
Alliance	Danny Donnelly		
Sinn Féin	Ciarán O’Connor		

==== 2022 ====
2022 Assembly election: East Antrim – 5 seats
Party	Candidate	FPv%	Count				
Party	Candidate	FPv%	1	2	3	4	5
UUP	**John Stewart**	15.40%	6,195	6,267	**8,459**		
DUP	**Gordon Lyons**	15.55%	6,256	6,281	6,555	**6,873**	
Alliance	**Stewart Dickson**	12.57%	5,059	5,643	5,910	6,370	**7,207**
Alliance	**Danny Donnelly**	10.50%	4,224	4,759	4,844	5,001	**6,784**
DUP	**David Hilditch**	14.07%	5,662	5,690	6,110	6,500	**6,544**
TUV	Norman Boyd	9.10%	3,661	3,699	4,007	4,408	4,467
Sinn Féin	Oliver McMullan	9.13%	3,675	4,154	4,171	4,180	
UUP	Roy Beggs Jr	8.82%	3,549	3,634			
SDLP	Siobhán McAlister	2.98%	1,200				
Green (NI)	Mark Bailey	1.87%	754				
Electorate: 67,699 Valid: 40,235 (59.43%) Spoilt: 458 Quota: 6,706 Turnout: 40,693 (60.11%)

==== 2017 ====
2017 Assembly election: East Antrim – 5 seats
Party	Candidate	FPv%	Count								
Party	Candidate	FPv%	1	2	3	4	5	6	7	8	9
DUP	**David Hilditch**	16.03%	6,000	6,037	**6,248**						
Alliance	**Stewart Dickson**	11.17%	4,179	4,616	4,658	5,065	5,171	**6,783**			
UUP	**Roy Beggs Jr**	13.68%	5,121	5,272	5,589	5,714	6,156	**6,324**			
DUP	**Gordon Lyons**	10.29%	3,851	3,869	4,068	4,078	4,473	4,490	4,513.94	**7,553.94**	
UUP	**John Stewart**	9.02%	3,377	3,479	3,709	3,788	4,131	4,260	4,599.72	5,034.99	**6,343.88**
Sinn Féin	Oliver McMullan	9.89%	3,701	3,750	3,752	4,278	4,292	4,523	4,690.58	4,698.58	4,700.77
DUP	Stephen Ross	8.85%	3,313	3,334	3,527	3,539	3,816	3,825	3,834.12		
Alliance	Danny Donnelly	4.86%	1,817	2,087	2,105	2,470	2,515				
UKIP	Noel Jordan	4.22%	1,579	1,653	1,933	1,955					
SDLP	Margaret Anne McKillop	4.07%	1,524	1,633	1,653						
TUV	Ruth Wilson	4.24%	1,534	1,587							
Green (NI)	Dawn Patterson	2.08%	777								
Labour Alternative	Conor Sheridan	1.05%	393								
NI Conservatives	Alan Dunlop	0.41%	152								
Independent	Ricky Best	0.28%	106								
Electorate: 62,933 Valid: 37,424 (59.47%) Spoilt: 412 Quota: 6,238 Turnout: 37,836 (60.12%)

==== 2016 ====
2016 Assembly election: East Antrim – 6 seats
Party	Candidate	FPv%	Count											
Party	Candidate	FPv%	1	2	3	4	5	6	7	8	9	10	11	12
DUP	**David Hilditch**	18.22%	**5,906**											
DUP	**Gordon Lyons**	10.71%	3,472	4,323.76	4,362.49	4,372.7	4,488.33	4,500.96	4,512.17	**4,857.17**				
UUP	**Roy Beggs Jr**	11.87%	3,848	3,935.78	4,011.99	4,031.99	4,280.04	4,327.46	4,342.67	**4,707.67**				
Alliance	**Stewart Dickson**	9.61%	3,115	3,126.34	3,130.34	3,196.34	3,224.34	3,504.55	3,745.97	3,778.18	3,780.55	**5,233.55**		
DUP	**Alastair Ross**	7.17%	2,323	2,498.98	2,536.71	2,545.71	2,580.18	2,592.39	2,607.39	2,883.37	3,071.39	3,107.86	3,173.14	**4,096.44**
Sinn Féin	**Oliver McMullan**	8.12%	2,633	2,633.42	2,634.42	2,679.42	2,691.42	2,721.42	3,280.42	3,282.42	3,282.42	3,469.63	3,628.99	**3,672.27**
UKIP	Noel Jordan	6.81%	2,207	2,249.63	2,423.68	2,450.68	2,452.1	2,502.31	2,521.31	2,929.62	2,953.32	2,986.11	3,053.31	3,567.48
UUP	John Stewart	6.12%	1,985	2,013.56	2,051.61	2,071.61	2,269.45	2,307.45	2,321.45	2,534.55	2,545.61	2,621.61	2,926.89	
Alliance	Danny Donnelly	5.04%	1,632	1,634.31	1,635.31	1,710.31	1,729.31	1,909.31	2,220.31	2,241.31	2,242.1			
TUV	Ruth Wilson	5.07%	1,643	1,658.75	1,711.96	1,721.96	1,771.59	1,787.59	1,795.59					
SDLP	Margaret Anne McKillop	3.79%	1,229	1,230.05	1,232.05	1,291.05	1,305.26	1,380.26						
Green (NI)	Dawn Patterson	2.14%	693	694.68	704.68	878.68	886.68							
UUP	Maureen Morrow	2.22%	719	724.46	735.67	746.67								
Labour Alternative	Conor Sheridan	1.70%	551	551.42	557.42									
PUP	Jim McCaw	1.40%	455	463.19										
Electorate: 64,194 Valid: 32,411 (50.49%) Spoilt: 333 Quota: 4,631 Turnout: 32,744 (51.01%)

==== 2011 ====
2011 Assembly election: East Antrim – 6 seats
Party	Candidate	FPv%	Count									
Party	Candidate	FPv%	1	2	3	4	5	6	7	8	9	10
DUP	**Sammy Wilson**	24.74%	**7,181**									
DUP	**David Hilditch**	11.33%	3,288	**4,218.52**								
DUP	**Alastair Ross**	5.54%	1,608	2,566.47	2,641.64	2,645.5	2,937.98	**4,266.98**				
Alliance	**Stewart Dickson**	9.95%	2,889	2,976.72	3,162.16	3,410.17	3,480.32	3,519.67	3,526.67	3,533.69	**4,776.69**	
UUP	**Roy Beggs Jr**	10.48%	3,042	3,349.45	3,450.33	3,468.62	3,839.29	4,037.35	4,080.35	4,125.17	**4,194.17**	
Sinn Féin	**Oliver McMullan**	8.16%	2,369	2,379.32	2,416.75	2,917.47	2,925.33	2,931.05	2,931.05	2,931.29	3,249.8	**3,388.8**
UUP	Rodney McCune	6.38%	1,851	1,958.07	2,029.65	2,038.08	2,343.26	2,417.54	2,446.54	2,462.92	2,603.11	2,890.11
Alliance	Gerardine Mulvenna	5.58%	1,620	1,689.23	1,869.1	2,313.68	2,356.4	2,388.73	2,391.73	2,394.43		
DUP	Gordon Lyons	4.55%	1,321	1,601.36	1,716.26	1,733.41	1,972.69					
TUV	Ruth Wilson	4.64%	1,346	1,509.4	1,650.84	1,653.84						
SDLP	Justin McCamphill	4.59%	1,333	1,344.61	1,433.33							
Green (NI)	Daniel Donnelly	2.29%	664	685.07								
BNP	Steven Moore	1.76%	511	545.83								
Electorate: 61,617 Valid: 29,023 (47.10%) Spoilt: 401 Quota: 4,147 Turnout: 29,424 (47.75%)

==== 2007 ====
2007 Assembly election: East Antrim – 6 seats
Party	Candidate	FPv%	Count												
Party	Candidate	FPv%	1	2	3	4	5	6	7	8	9	10	11	12	13
DUP	**Sammy Wilson**	22.49%	**6,755**												
DUP	**George Dawson**	13.87%	4,167	**4,777.56**											
DUP	**David Hilditch**	9.09%	2,732	4,165.16	**4,586.84**										
Alliance	**Seán Neeson**	10.37%	3,114	3,171.6	3,176.64	3,193.54	3,252.88	3,321.4	3,530.18	3,603	3,756	**5,191**			
UUP	**Roy Beggs Jr**	10.24%	3,076	3,164.56	3,182.76	3,276.1	3,304.22	3,361.08	3,438.3	3,623.68	3,632.04	3,753.3	4,039.53	**5,114.53**	
UUP	**Ken Robinson**	6.26%	1,881	1,955.52	1,962.24	2,022.04	2,036.3	2,102.82	2,135	2,344.92	2,350.92	2,447.02	2,720.2	3,411.69	**4,195.15**
SDLP	Danny O'Connor	5.89%	1,769	1,774.76	1,775.04	1,778.16	1,806.24	1,821.5	1,881.5	1,892.76	2,773.76	2,887.12	3,152.47	3,267.81	3,297.91
UUP	Mark Dunn	5.38%	1,617	1,690.44	1,698.56	1,746.66	1,791.14	1,824.18	1,865.26	2,053.48	2,061.48	2,103.34	2,175.55		
Alliance	Stewart Dickson	5.41%	1,624	1,636.96	1,638.36	1,642.52	1,683.52	1,722.60	1,919.46	1,959.74	1,983.74				
Sinn Féin	Oliver McMullan	3.89%	1,168	1,168.36	1,168.36	1,168.36	1,176.36	1,179.36	1,203.36	1,206.36					
UK Unionist	Thomas Robinson	2.43%	731	770.96	775.16	814.94	842.42	902.12	937.72						
Green (NI)	Mark Bailey	2.04%	612	621	622.96	628.42	725.98	793							
NI Conservatives	Tim Lewis	1.31%	395	405.8	409.16	418.78	453.4								
Independent	John Anderson	1.32%	398	408.44	409.56	416.84									
Electorate: 56,666 Valid: 30,039 (53.01%) Spoilt: 254 Quota: 4,292 Turnout: 30,293 (53.46%)

==== 2003 ====
2003 Assembly election: East Antrim – 6 seats
Party	Candidate	FPv%	Count														
Party	Candidate	FPv%	1	2	3	4	5	6	7	8	9	10	11	12	13	14	15
UUP	**Roy Beggs Jr**	16.72%	**5,175**														
DUP	**Sammy Wilson**	14.68%	**4,544**														
UUP	**Ken Robinson**	6.66%	2,062	2,156	2,158	2,164	2,192	2,204	2,223	2,251	2,346	2,450	2,452	2,531	2,560	2,786	**4,838**
Alliance	**Seán Neeson**	7.04%	2,180	2,208	2,209	2,235	2,258	2,368	2,425	2,518	2,568	2,604	2,663	2,713	3,920	4,025	**4,265**
DUP	**David Hilditch**	9.23%	2,856	2,883	2,940	2,943	2,964	2,975	2,980	3,003	3,100	3,189	3,189	3,429	3,465	4,034	**4,142**
DUP	**George Dawson**	10.22%	3,163	3,197	3,219	3,224	3,238	3,244	3,273	3,292	3,382	3,472	3,472	3,652	3,671	4,061	**4,128**
SDLP	Danny O'Connor	7.84%	2,428	2,433	2,433	2,441	2,442	2,481	2,494	2,536	2,545	2,556	3,204	3,215	3,252	3,298	3,332
UUP	Roy McCune	5.32%	1,646	2,094	2,095	2,103	2,134	2,151	2,190	2,223	2,315	2,425	2,430	2,492	2,553	2,720	
Independent	Jack McKee	4.68%	1,449	1,467	1,471	1,471	1,473	1,475	1,506	1,602	1,627	1,745	1,748	1,974	1,984		
Alliance	Stewart Dickson	3.85%	1,192	1,215	1,216	1,243	1,267	1,329	1,363	1,398	1,411	1,431	1,440	1,460			
Independent	Roger Hutchinson	3.27%	1,011	1,019	1,020	1,023	1,031	1,036	1,061	1,101	1,150	1,180	1,182				
Sinn Féin	Oliver McMullan	2.48%	768	768	768	769	770	775	776	778	778	779					
UK Unionist	Thomas Robinson	1.82%	564	574	575	575	591	595	603	632	652						
PUP	Carolyn Howarth	1.73%	534	540	540	543	550	566	574	591							
Independent	Lindsay Mason	1.18%	364	368	368	385	394	409	515								
Independent	John Anderson	1.12%	348	353	354	364	372	389									
NI Women's Coalition	Anne Monaghan	0.99%	307	309	310	341	348										
NI Conservatives	Alan Greer	0.63%	196	202	202	211											
Green (NI)	Andrew Frew	0.53%	165	166	166												
Electorate: 55,473 Valid: 30,952 (55.80%) Spoilt: 391 Quota: 4,422 Turnout: 31,343 (56.50%)

==== 1998 ====
1998 Assembly election: East Antrim – 6 seats
Party	Candidate	FPv%	Count												
Party	Candidate	FPv%	1	2	3	4	5	6	7	8	9	10	11	12	13
UUP	**Roy Beggs Jr**	16.19%	**5,764**												
Alliance	**Seán Neeson**	14.73%	**5,247**												
DUP	**David Hilditch**	13.69%	4,876	4,918.46	4,921.46	4,943.56	4,953.67	4,955.77	5,036.91	**5,214.91**					
UUP	**Ken Robinson**	6.69%	2,384	2,622.59	2,623.7	2,653.02	2,690.9	2,696.72	2,768.7	3,120.84	3,566.11	4,272.22	4,289.22	**6,275.22**	
UK Unionist	**Roger Hutchinson**	8.05%	2,866	2,902.19	2,903.19	2,947.62	2,974.84	2,975.83	3,012.30	3,133.69	3,430.28	3,565.98	3,604.98	3,855.39	**4,220.39**
SDLP	**Danny O'Connor**	5.91%	2,106	2,108.2	2,111.2	2,116.2	2,190.42	2,210.73	2,879.33	2,948.77	2,977.09	3,652.01	3,652.01	3,896.71	**4,190.71**
DUP	Jack McKee	8.46%	3,013	3,042.7	3,043.7	3,050.14	3,079.13	3,079.94	3,154.57	3,289.9	3,551.23	3,627.75	3,681.75	3,905.34	4,142.34
UUP	May Steele	6.74%	2,399	2,504.05	2,506.16	2,534.38	2,594.93	2,601.17	2,629.36	2,803.48	3,125.82	3,547.92	3,561.92		
Alliance	Stewart Dickson	5.39%	1,921	1,943.77	1,950.77	1,984.19	2,069.3	2,174.42	2,232.87	2,429.58	2,744.26				
Ind. Unionist	James Brown	4.41%	1,571	1,673.08	1,674.08	1,703.4	1,723.51	1,730.02	1,785.77	1,987.57					
PUP	William Greer	4.02%	1,432	1,455.54	1,458.54	1,477.42	1,503.64	1,507.48	1,703.12						
Sinn Féin	Chrissie McAuley	2.09%	746	746.11	746.11	746.11	763.11	764.4							
Ulster Democratic	Tommy Kirkham	1.67%	596	605.79	605.79	610.79	624.01	625.09							
Independent	Lindsay Mason	1.19%	424	427.74	431.74	440.74									
NI Conservatives	Terence Dick	0.65%	233	242.46	243.57										
Natural Law	James McKissock	0.09%	32	32.33											
Electorate: 59,313 Valid: 35,610 (60.04%) Spoilt: 493 Quota: 5,088 Turnout: 36,103 (60.87%)

=== 1996 forum ===
Successful candidates are shown in bold.

Party	Candidate(s)	Votes	Percentage
UUP	**May Steele**; **Thomas Robinson**; James Brown; Eric Ferguson; David Fleck	10,036	30.1
DUP	**Jack McKee**; **May Beattie**; Noel McAllister	9,557	28.7
Alliance	**Seán Neeson**; Stewart Dickson; Amelia Kelly; Bill McKimmon; Janet Crampsey	3,957	11.9
PUP	William Donaldson; William Hamilton; William Greer; George Ferguson; William Adamson	2,254	6.8
SDLP	Danny O'Connor; Mary White	2,213	6.6
UK Unionist	Mark Dingwall; Arthur Cowden	2,041	6.1
Ulster Democratic	Tommy Kirkham; Joe English	1,141	3.4
Sinn Féin	Mary Davey; Martin Meehan; Una Gillespie	619	1.9
NI Women's Coalition	Angela Hegarty; Jaqueline Weir; Carmel Gallagher	323	1.0
NI Conservatives	Sam Crowe; Donald Tomb	271	0.8
Green (NI)	Sharon Morrow; Jenny McMillan; Paddy Agnew	224	0.7
Labour coalition	William McClinton; Joseph Watson	218	0.6
Independent DUP	Neville Steel; Allen Boyland	107	0.3
Democratic Partnership	Maureen Sykes; Rachel McKeown	102	0.3
Ulster Independence	Cecil Kane; Victor King	86	0.3
Independent McMullan	William Cunning; James Simmons	81	0.2
Workers' Party	Austin Kelly; Brendan Heaney	69	0.2
Democratic Left	Kevin Smyth; Eamon Lynch	33	0.1
Natural Law	John Collins; Andrea Gribben	14	0.0
Independent Chambers	Georgina Strain; Hudson Strain	5	0.0
