= Hugh Wilson (Northern Ireland politician) =

Northern Irish politician

Hugh Smyth

Member of Larne Borough Council
- In office 30 May 1973 – 15 May 1985
- Preceded by: Council created
- Succeeded by: District abolished
- Constituency: Larne Area A

Member of the Constitutional Convention for North Antrim
- In office 1975–1976
- Preceded by: Convention created
- Succeeded by: Convention dissolved

Member of the Northern Ireland Assembly for North Antrim
- In office 28 June 1973 – 1974
- Preceded by: Assembly established
- Succeeded by: Assembly abolished

Personal details
- Born: 1905 Ballyclare, County Antrim, Northern Ireland
- Died: 4 January 1998 (aged 92–93)
- Party: Alliance

Hugh Wilson (1905 – 4 January 1998) was a Northern Irish politician.

== Background ==
Born in Ballyclare, Wilson worked as a surgeon. At the 1969 Northern Ireland general election, he stood as an unofficial Unionist supporter of the Prime Minister Terence O'Neill, taking 48% of the vote but being narrowly defeated by William Craig.

In the 1973 Northern Ireland local elections, Wilson was elected in Area "A" of Larne Borough Council, and held his seat in 1977 and 1981.

Wilson was elected in the 1973 Northern Ireland Assembly election in North Antrim, and held his seat on the Northern Ireland Constitutional Convention. He stood unsuccessfully for the Alliance Party in Ian Paisley's Westminster seat of North Antrim in February 1974 and 1979. In the late 1970s, Wilson served as President of the Alliance Party.

Northern Ireland Assembly (1973)
New assembly	Assembly Member for North Antrim; 1973–1974	Assembly abolished
Northern Ireland Constitutional Convention
New convention	Member for North Antrim; 1975–1976	Convention dissolved
