= John Turnley =

Irish nationalist councillor (1935–1980)

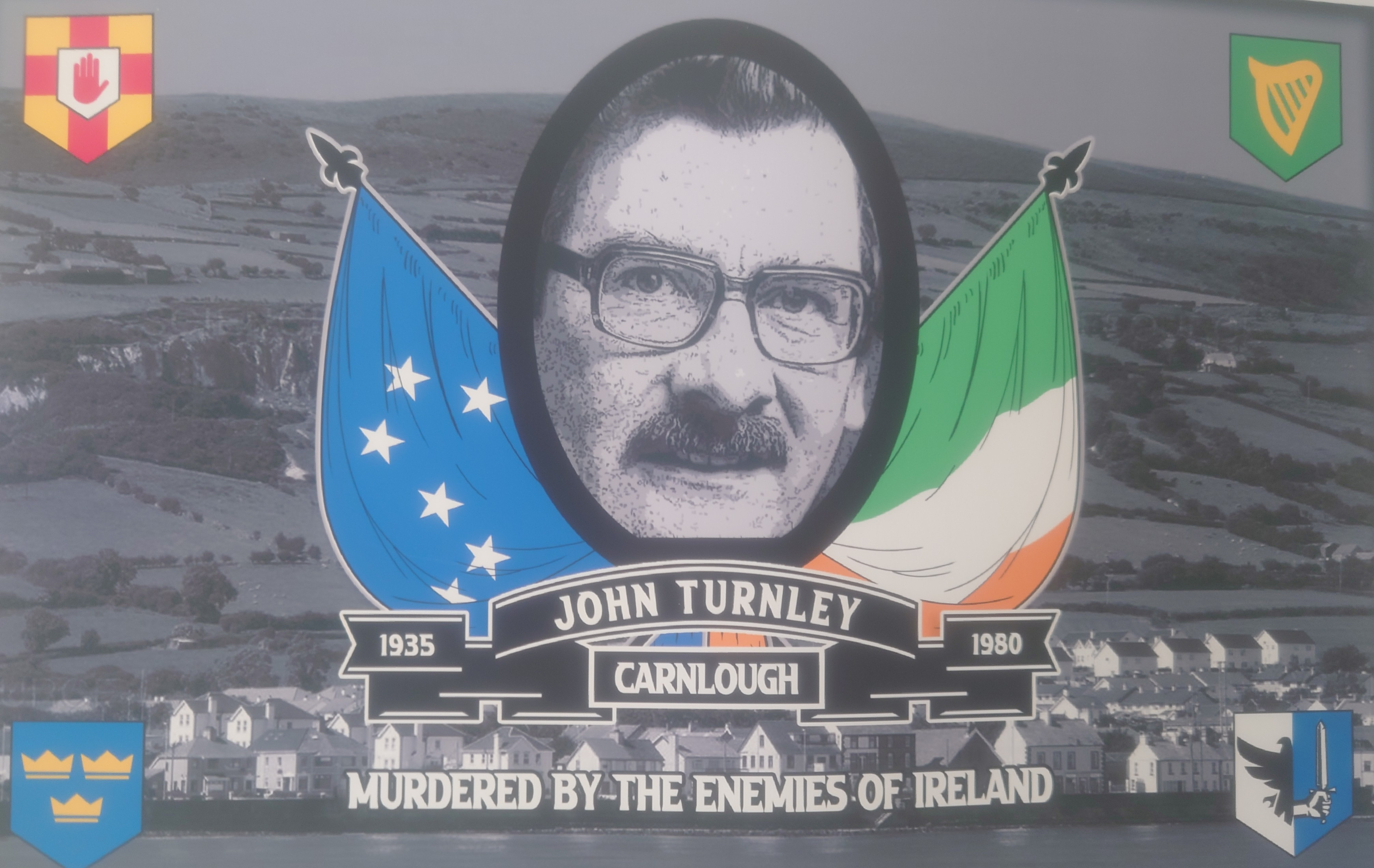

John Turnley (1935 – 5 June 1980) was an assassinated Irish nationalist councillor and activist. Originally from a unionist background, he was gradually drawn to Irish nationalism and became a republican activist. He was killed in 1980 by loyalists in Carnlough, County Antrim.

== Background ==
A teacher by profession, Turnley was born into a wealthy landed Protestant family. He attended Rockport School in Holywood, Co Down. His father was a leading member of the Ulster Unionist Party. After serving as a British Army officer, Turnley worked in Japan, marrying a Japanese woman. In 1972 he returned to Northern Ireland, set up home in his native Carnlough and joined the Social Democratic and Labour Party (SDLP). Upon joining the SDLP, his father reacted by trying to disinherit him. The following year, he stood unsuccessfully for the party in the local government elections for Larne borough council, and was also unsuccessful in North Antrim at the 1973 Northern Ireland Assembly election.

He took second place in an Assembly by-election the following year, and in 1975 he was elected to the Northern Ireland Constitutional Convention. He was also elected to Larne council in 1977, representing Larne 'Area A' which covered the Coast Road areas.

Turnley became disillusioned with the SDLP in the late 1970s, and in October 1977 became a founder member of the newly formed Irish Independence Party, becoming the party chairman. He unsuccessfully contested North Antrim in the 1979 Westminster Election. He also became a leading member of the National H-Blocks Committee, which sought to obtain political status for Irish Republican prisoners.

== Death ==
On 5 June 1980, Turnley drove to Carnlough, for a meeting with other councillors to discuss development in the area. When his car came to a halt, three Ulster Defence Association (UDA) gunmen struck, firing numerous shots, hitting Turnley several times in the chest and body. He died in the ambulance on the way to Larne's Moyle Hospital. Two years later, three men from Larne were convicted of his murder and sentenced to life imprisonment.

== Aftermath ==
One of the three men, Robert "Bobby" McConnell, later joined the Ulster Unionist Party (UUP) and holds the position of vice chairman of the West Belfast Ulster Unionist Association. He was selected to run in the 2011 Belfast council elections but was unsuccessful. McConnell was also convicted of the murder of a Catholic in Larne six weeks after the assassination of Turnley.

Northern Ireland Constitutional Convention
| New convention | Member for North Antrim; 1975–1976 | Convention dissolved |
