= Roy Beggs =

Northern Irish UUP politician

Member of Larne Borough Council
- In office 15 May 1985 – 22 May 2014
- Preceded by: District created
- Succeeded by: Council abolished
- Constituency: Larne Lough
- In office 30 May 1973 – 15 May 1985
- Preceded by: District created
- Succeeded by: District abolished
- Constituency: Larne Area B

Member of Parliament for East Antrim
- In office 9 June 1983 – 11 April 2005
- Preceded by: New constituency
- Succeeded by: Sammy Wilson

Member of the Northern Ireland Assembly for North Antrim
- In office 20 October 1982 – 1986
- Preceded by: Assembly re-established
- Succeeded by: Assembly dissolved

Personal details
- Born: 20 February 1936 (age 90) Ballyclare, County Antrim, Northern Ireland
- Party: Ulster Unionist Party (1982-present)
- Other political affiliations: Democratic Unionist Party (1973 - 1981)
- Spouse: Wilma Beggs
- Relations: Roy Beggs Jnr (son)
- Children: 4
- Education: Stranmillis University College
- Profession: Teacher
- Website: Roy Beggs

John Robert Beggs (born 20 February 1936), commonly known as Roy Beggs, is a Northern Irish unionist politician and former teacher. Formerly a member of the Democratic Unionist Party (DUP), he defected to the rival Ulster Unionist Party (UUP) in 1981. He served as Member of Parliament (MP) for East Antrim from 1983 to 2005, and was a Larne Borough Councillor from 1973 to 2014, representing the district of Larne Area B and its successor, Larne Lough.

== Background ==
Beggs was educated at Ballyclare High School, followed by Stranmillis College, to study teacher training. After his training Beggs became a teacher at Larne High School and had risen to be deputy principal before leaving the profession upon his election to the Westminster Parliament.

=== Political career ===
He first entered politics in 1973 as a councillor for Larne Borough Council. for the Democratic Unionist Party. He was suspended from the party in 1981 after taking part in a council visit to Dún Laoghaire–Rathdown County Council local authority in Dublin. He moved to the Ulster Unionist Party and was re-elected in 1981 as a 'loyalist'. He joined the UUP in 1982 and has retained his council seat to date, serving several terms as Mayor of Larne from 1978 until 1983. In 1982 he was elected to the Northern Ireland Assembly representing North Antrim.

In 1983 he was selected for the new East Antrim in the 1983 general election. With most expecting the DUP to win the seat, he became the new MP in the surprise result. He held the position until the 2005 general election when he was defeated by Sammy Wilson of the DUP. He was UUP Education Spokesman from 1986 up to and including his last few years in Parliament when he also served as Deputy Leader and Chief Whip of the Ulster Unionist Parliamentary Party.

Beggs was known as one of the more hard-line members of the UUP, being vociferous in his Euroscepticism and his suspicions about the Belfast Agreement – initially involving himself in Union First (a group within the Ulster Unionist Party opposed to the Agreement), although in his final two years in Parliament, he appeared publicly supportive of the Agreement and of leader David Trimble. A renowned opponent of "progressive" teaching methods and a supporter of maintaining Northern Ireland's grammar schools, he attacked proposals to abolish academic selection in post-primary education in Northern Ireland.

Beggs was also a strong supporter of the Orange Order during their stand-off over Drumcree Church and in 1995 took part in a blockade of the port of Larne as part of a show of solidarity. Beggs was charged with Public Order offences for his involvement and was fined £1,350. In March 2001, he apologised in the House of Commons for failing to register a local business interest.

== Personal life ==
He lives in Larne and operates a farm and owns a landfill site. He is also the Chairman of the North Eastern Education and Library Board, as well as continuing his council work. He has four children. His son, Roy Beggs Jr was a member of the Northern Ireland Assembly from 1998 until losing his seat in the 2022 Northern Ireland Assembly election.

Civic offices
Unknown	Mayor of Larne; 1978–1983	Succeeded by Tom Robinson
Northern Ireland Assembly (1982)
New assembly	MPA for North Antrim; 1982–1986	Assembly abolished
Parliament of the United Kingdom
New constituency	Member of Parliament for East Antrim; 1983–2005	Succeeded by Sammy Wilson
