= Larne Borough Council =

Former local council in Northern Ireland

Coordinates: 54.855°N 5.838°W

Larne Borough: Buirg Latharna
- Area: 336 km^{2} (130 sq mi)
- Country: Northern Ireland
- Sovereign state: United Kingdom

Larne Borough Council was a Local Council in County Antrim in Northern Ireland. It merged with Ballymena Borough Council and Carrickfergus Borough Council in May 2015 under the reorganisation of local government in Northern Ireland to become Mid and East Antrim Borough Council.

Its headquarters was in the town of Larne.

The Borough of Larne was divided into 3 electoral areas: Larne Town, Larne Lough and Coast Road. At the final election in 2011 15 members were elected from the following political parties: 4 Democratic Unionist Party (DUP), 3 Ulster Unionist Party (UUP), 2 Independent, 3 Alliance Party, 1 Traditional Unionist Voice, 1 Sinn Féin and 1 Social Democratic and Labour Party (SDLP).

Aldermen Jack McKee (TUV) and Roy Beggs (UUP) were the longest serving councillors on the council.

Together with the neighbouring former district of Carrickfergus and part of the former district of Newtownabbey, it forms the East Antrim constituency for elections to the Westminster Parliament and Northern Ireland Assembly.

Settlements and villages in the former borough include Ballycarry, Islandmagee, Ballystrudder, Glynn, Magheramorne, Ballygalley, Cairnalbanagh, Glenarm and Carnlough.

See Also: Local Councils in Northern Ireland

== 2011 Election results ==
Map of the borough's DEAs from 1993 to 2014

Party		seats	change +/-
•	Democratic Unionist Party	4	-1
•	Ulster Unionist Party	3	-1
	Alliance Party of Northern Ireland	3	+1
•	Independent	2	=
•	Sinn Féin	1	+1
•	Social Democratic and Labour Party	1	-1
•	Traditional Unionist Voice	1	+1

== Mayors of Larne ==
1973: Aubrey Girvan, Independent
1974: Tommy Seymour, Vanguard
1975: Tommy Seymour
1976: Tommy Seymour
1977: Tommy Seymour
1978: Roy Beggs, DUP then UUP
1983: Thomas Robinson, UUP
1984: Jack McKee, DUP
1985:
1986: Rosalie Armstrong, UUP
1987: Winston Fulton, DUP
1989: Rosalie Armstrong, UUP
1995:
1996: Sam McAllister, DUP
1997: Joan Drummond, UUP
1999:
2000: David Fleck, UUP
2002: Bobby McKee, DUP
2004: Roy Craig, Independent
2005:
2006: Danny O'Connor, SDLP
2007: Mark Dunn, UUP
2008: Bobby McKee, DUP
2010: Andy Wilson
2011: Bobby McKee, DUP
2012: Gerardine Mulvenna, Alliance
2013: Maureen Morrow, UUP
2014: Martin Wilson, SDLP

== Review of Public Administration ==
Under the Review of Public Administration (RPA) the council was due to merge with Ballymena Borough Council and Carrickfergus Borough Council in 2011 to form a single council for the enlarged area totalling 1047 km^{2} and a population of 127,101. The next election was due to take place in May 2009, but on 25 April 2008, Shaun Woodward, Secretary of State for Northern Ireland announced that the scheduled 2009 district council elections were to be postponed until the introduction of the eleven new councils in 2011. New local government district councils took over from the 26 former councils on 1 April 2015.

== Freedom of the Borough ==
In memory of a battle in the town of Musa Qala in Afghanistan in 2006, involving the Royal Irish Regiment, a new regimental march, composed by Chris Attrill and commissioned by Larne Borough Council, was gifted to the regiment on Saturday 1 November 2008 in Larne, during an event in which the regiment was also presented with the 'Freedom of the Borough'. This gave the regiment the right to march through the towns of the borough with 'flags flying, bands playing and bayonets fixed'. The march was named, 'Musa Qala'.

== Council services ==
- Carnfunnock Country Park, 3.5 miles from Larne, is owned and run by the council.

== Population ==
The area covered by the former Larne Borough Council had a population of 32,180 residents according to the 2011 Northern Ireland census.
