= George Henderson (Northern Ireland politician) =

George Henderson was a farmer and politician in Northern Ireland.

Henderson worked as a farmer in County Antrim. Around the time of his retirement, he was appointed Chairman of the Unbought Tenants' Association. Standing as a representative of that group, he won a seat in Antrim at the 1925 Northern Ireland general election. The seat was abolished at the 1929 general election, and Henderson instead contested Bannside on behalf of the Ulster Liberal Party. He took second place, and was not elected. He also contested the Westminster seat of Antrim as a Liberal at the 1929 general election, but was not close to being elected. He had two children, Arnold Henderson and Jean Middlemas Henderson

Parliament of Northern Ireland
Preceded by Milne Barbour; Hugh O'Neill; Robert Crawford; George Hanna; Robert Megaw; John Fawcett Gordon; Joseph Devlin	Member of Parliament for Antrim; 1925–1929; With: Milne Barbour; Hugh O'Neill; Thomas Stanislaus McAllister; Robert Crawford; George Hanna; John Fawcett Gordon	Constituency abolished
