= Megaw =

Megaw is a surname. Notable people with the surname include:

- Eric Megaw (1908 – 1956) Irish Engineer
- Helen Megaw (1907–2002), Irish crystallographer
- John Megaw (1909–1997), British judge and rugby union player
- Peter Megaw (1910–2006), Irish architectural historian and archaeologist
- Robert Megaw (1869–1947), Northern Irish barrister and politician
- Vincent Megaw (born 1934), Australian archaeologist, also his wife Ruth Megaw

== See also ==
- Megaw Island
