= Robert Megaw =

Barrister and politician from Northern Ireland (1869–1947)

Robert Dick Megaw (26 October 1867 – 2 May 1947) was an Irish barrister and a Unionist politician.

Megaw was born in Ballymoney, Antrim, on 26 October 1867, the son of farmer John Megaw and Ellen Dick. He was educated at Ballymoney Intermediate School, the Royal Belfast Academical Institution and Queen's College, Belfast and served as the 41st President of the Literary and Scientific Society (Queen's University Belfast). He practiced law in Dublin for a while, being called to the Irish Bar in 1893, and serving as Professor of Common Law at King's Inns there from 1912 to 1914. He was appointed King's Counsel in 1921.

In 1921, he moved back to Belfast where he was elected to the Parliament of Northern Ireland as one of seven members for County Antrim, but was defeated in the general election of 1925. Megaw served as Parliamentary Secretary to the Ministry of Home Affairs from 1921 to 1925.

Following the loss of his seat in Parliament, he was appointed by the Minister of Home Affairs as a commissioner from 1925–26 to inquire into the administration of the Housing Acts by Belfast Corporation. He was Judicial Commissioner of the Land Purchase Commission of Northern Ireland from 1927 to 1937 and Chancery Judge of the High Court of Northern Ireland from 1932 to 1943. He was also a member of the Senate of Queen's University, Belfast. He died on 2 May 1947.

In August 1906, Megaw married Annie McElderry (1874-1968), who was also from Ballymoney and a QUB graduate, then teaching mathematics at the Rutland School in Dublin. Of their numerous children, daughter Helen Megaw became a noted crystallographer.

== Notes ==
Parliament of Northern Ireland
New constituency	Member of Parliament for Antrim; 1921–1925; With: Milne Barbour; Hugh O'Neill; George Hanna; Robert Crawford; John Fawcett Gordon; Joseph Devlin	Succeeded by Milne Barbour; Hugh O'Neill; Thomas Stanislaus McAllister; Robert Crawford; George Hanna; George Henderson; John Fawcett Gordon
Political offices
New office	Parliamentary Secretary to the Ministry of Home Affairs; 1921–1925	Succeeded by George Hanna
