= McCalmont =

McCalmont is a surname. Notable people with the surname include:

- Harry McCalmont (1861–1902), British Army officer, racehorse owner, yachtsman and politician
- Hugh McCalmont (1845–1924), British politician
- James McCalmont (1847–1913), British Army officer and politician
- Robert McCalmont (1881–1953), Northern Irish politician and British Army officer

== See also ==
- McCalmont Township, Pennsylvania
- McCalmont Cup, a greyhound racing competition in Kilkenny, Ireland
