= East Antrim (UK Parliament constituency) =

UK Parliament constituency (1885–1922, 1983 onwards)

- County constituency for the House of Commons
- Interactive map of boundaries from 2024
- Location within Northern Ireland
- District: Causeway Coast and Glens; Mid and East Antrim; Antrim and Newtownabbey
- Electorate: 73,302 (May 2024)
- Major settlements: Larne, Carrickfergus and Whitehead

Current constituency
- Created: 1983
- Member of Parliament: Sammy Wilson (Democratic Unionist)
- Seats: 1
- Created from: North Antrim; South Antrim

1885–1922
- Seats: 1
- Type of constituency: County constituency
- Created from: County Antrim; Carrickfergus
- Replaced by: Antrim

East Antrim is a parliamentary constituency in the United Kingdom House of Commons. The MP since 2005 is Sammy Wilson of the Democratic Unionist Party.

Map of boundaries 2010–2024

The constituency of East Antrim is used for elections to the Northern Ireland Assembly.

== Constituency profile ==
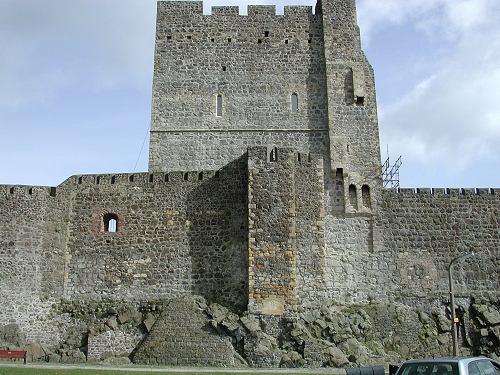
Carrickfergus Castle

The seat covers the east coast from Cushendun down to Carrickfergus. The seat is strongly unionist and one of the few areas of Northern Ireland which voted to leave the European Union.

== History ==
The pre-1922 constituency was a strongly conservative then unionist area, where republican and nationalist candidates were not elected. A victory for the Unionist candidate in 1918 by 15,206 votes to Sinn Féin's 861 votes demonstrated the virtual unanimity of the unionist support. Sinn Féin did not contest the 1919 East Antrim by-election.

Similarly, the post-1983 constituency has been overwhelmingly unionist, with the combined votes for nationalist parties rarely exceeding 10%. However, there have been above average votes for parties outside the traditional unionist block, such as the Alliance and the Conservatives. In the local government elections for the equivalent area many votes often go to independent candidates or groups such as the Newtownabbey Ratepayers Association. While the SDLP sprung a surprise in 1998 by overtaking a DUP candidate to win the final seat due to Ulster Unionist transfers – the first time that any nationalist candidate has benefited in this way.

The main interest in Westminster Elections has been the contest between the Ulster Unionist Party and the Democratic Unionist Party. In 1983 the UUP were only 367 votes ahead of the DUP. As part of a pact to oppose the Anglo-Irish Agreement the DUP did not contest the seat until 1992 but they still failed to come close, though in the 1996 elections to the Northern Ireland Forum they were only slightly behind the UUP. But in the 2001 general election they achieved an astonishing result when they came with 128 votes of winning the Westminster seat, despite not having targeted it. In the 2003 Assembly election they followed this up by gaining two additional MLAs and outpolling the UUP for the first time.

The DUP remained eager to take the Westminster seat and in the 2005 general election they did so.

== Boundaries ==
From 1801 to 1885, County Antrim returned two MPs to the House of Commons of the United Kingdom sitting at the Palace of Westminster, with separate representation for the parliamentary boroughs of Belfast and Carrickfergus. Under the Redistribution of Seats Act 1885, Carrickfergus ceased to exist as a parliamentary borough and the parliamentary county was divided into four divisions: North Antrim, Mid Antrim, East Antrim, and South Antrim. The division of East Antrim was defined as:

The baronies of— Belfast Lower, Glenarm Upper, Antrim Lower (except so much as is comprised in Mid Antrim), Antrim Upper (except so much as is comprised in South Antrim),

so much of the barony of Belfast Upper as comprises the parts of the parishes of Ballymartin and Templepatrick (except the townland of Ballyutoag);

and the county of the town of Carrickfergus.

It was not affected by the Redistribution of Seats (Ireland) Act 1918. Sinn Féin contested the 1918 general election on an abstentionist platform in its election manifesto pledging that instead of taking up any seats at Westminster, they would establish an assembly in Dublin. All MPs elected to Irish seats were invited to participate in the First Dáil convened in January 1919, but no members outside of Sinn Féin did so.

The Government of Ireland Act 1920 established the Parliament of Northern Ireland, which came into operation in 1921. The representation of Northern Ireland in the Parliament of the United Kingdom was reduced from 30 MPs to 13 MPs, taking effect at the 1922 United Kingdom general election. At Westminster, the four divisions of County Antrim were replaced by a two-member county constituency of Antrim. A seven-seat constituency of Antrim was created for the House of Commons of Northern Ireland, which formed the basis in republican theory for representation in the Second Dáil. Under the Representation of the People Act 1948, all two-member constituencies were divided. Antrim was divided into the county constituencies of North Antrim and South Antrim.

The constituency of East Antrim was recreated in 1983, from parts of North Antrim and South Antrim, as part of an expansion of Northern Ireland's constituencies from 12 to 17.

Prior to the 2010 general election, the Boundary Commission originally proposed two significant changes for East Antrim. In the south of the constituency it was proposed to transfer a further part of Newtownabbey to the North Belfast constituency whilst in the north the seat would have gained the Glens and Ballycastle in Moyle district from North Antrim. East Antrim would have been renamed Antrim Coast and Glens. However, this latter part of the proposal raised many questions, with some already arguing that the Glens have no natural ties to Jordanstown (and in 1995 the previous Boundary Commission cited this very reason when rejecting such a proposal). Following consultation and revising the recommendations, the new boundaries for East Antrim were confirmed. The constituency boundaries were amended again by the 2023 review of Westminster constituencies, and first contested at the 2024 general election.

1983–1997	The districts of Carrickfergus and Larne; and in the district of Newtownabbey, the wards of Bradan, Cloughfern, Coole, Dunanney, Hopefield, Monkstown, Rostulla, Whiteabbey, and Whitehouse.
1997–2010	The districts of Carrickfergus and Larne; and in the district of Newtownabbey, the wards of Cloughfern, Jordanstown, Monkstown, and Rostulla.
2010–2024	The districts of Carrickfergus and Larne; in the district of Moyle, the wards of Glenaan, Glenariff, and Glendun; and in the district of Newtownabbey, the wards of Jordanstown, Monkstown, and Rostulla.
2024–	In Antrim and Newtownabbey, the part of the Abbey ward to the north of the northern boundary of the 2010–2024 Belfast North constituency, and the wards of Jordanstown, Monkstown, and Rostulla; and in Mid and East Antrim the wards of Ballycarry and Glynn, Boneybefore, Burleigh Hill, Cairncastle, Carnlough and Glenarm, Castle, Craigyhill, Curran and Inver, Gardenmore, Glenravel, Glenwhirry, Gortalee, Greenisland, Islandmagee, Kilroot, Kilwaughter, Love Lane, Slemish, Sunnylands, The Maidens, Victoria, Whitehead South, and Woodburn.

== Members of Parliament ==
The Member of Parliament since the 2005 general election is Sammy Wilson of the Democratic Unionist Party. In that election he defeated Roy Beggs of the Ulster Unionist Party, who had sat for the seat since it was created at the 1983 general election.

Election	MP	Party
1885	James McCalmont	Irish Conservative
1913	Robert McCalmont	Irish Unionist
1919	George Hanna	Ind. Unionist
1922	constituency abolished	
1983	constituency recreated	
1983	Roy Beggs	UUP
2005	Sammy Wilson	DUP

== Election results ==
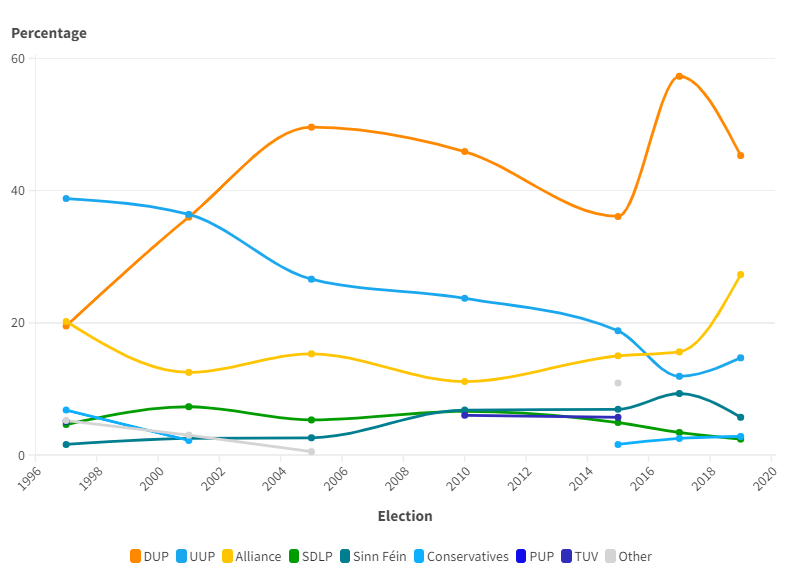

=== Elections in the 2020s ===
2024 general election: East Antrim
Party	Candidate	Votes	%	±%
DUP	Sammy Wilson	11,462	28.9	−13.0
Alliance	Danny Donnelly	10,156	25.6	−0.4
UUP	John Stewart	9,476	23.9	+7.3
TUV	Matthew Warwick	4,135	10.4	New
Sinn Féin	Oliver McMullan	2,986	7.5	−0.3
SDLP	Margaret McKillop	892	2.2	−1.4
Green (NI)	Mark Bailey	568	1.4	−0.3
Majority		1,306	3.3	−14.7
Turnout		39,675	54.1	−3.4
Registered electors		73,302		
DUP hold		Swing	−6.3	

=== Elections in the 2010s ===
2019 general election: East Antrim
Party	Candidate	Votes	%	±%
DUP	Sammy Wilson	16,871	45.3	−12.0
Alliance	Danny Donnelly	10,165	27.3	+11.7
UUP	Steve Aiken	5,475	14.7	+2.8
Sinn Féin	Oliver McMullan	2,120	5.7	−3.6
NI Conservatives	Aaron Rankin	1,043	2.8	+0.3
SDLP	Angela Mulholland	902	2.4	−1.0
Green (NI)	Philip Randle	685	1.8	New
Majority		6,716	18.0	−22.7
Turnout		37,261	57.5	−3.1
Registered electors		64,645		
DUP hold		Swing	−11.9	

2017 general election: East Antrim
Party	Candidate	Votes	%	±%
DUP	Sammy Wilson	21,873	57.3	+21.2
Alliance	Stewart Dickson	5,950	15.6	+0.6
UUP	John Stewart	4,524	11.9	−6.9
Sinn Féin	Oliver McMullan	3,555	9.3	+2.4
SDLP	Margaret Anne McKillop	1,278	3.4	−1.5
NI Conservatives	Mark Logan	963	2.5	+0.9
Majority		15,923	40.7	+23.4
Turnout		38,143	60.6	+7.3
Registered electors		62,908		
DUP hold		Swing	+10.3	

2015 general election: East Antrim
Party	Candidate	Votes	%	±%
DUP	Sammy Wilson	12,103	36.1	−9.8
UUP	Roy Beggs Jnr	6,308	18.8	−4.9
Alliance	Stewart Dickson	5,021	15.0	+3.9
UKIP	Noel Jordan	3,660	10.9	New
Sinn Féin	Oliver McMullan	2,314	6.9	+0.1
TUV	Ruth Wilson	1,903	5.7	−0.3
SDLP	Margaret Anne McKillop	1,639	4.9	−1.7
NI Conservatives	Alex Wilson	549	1.6	New
Majority		5,795	17.3	−4.9
Turnout		33,497	53.3	+2.6
Registered electors		62,811		
DUP hold		Swing	−2.4	

2010 general election: East Antrim
Party	Candidate	Votes	%	±%
DUP	Sammy Wilson	13,993	45.9	−1.0
UCU-NF	Rodney McCune	7,223	23.7	−1.4
Alliance	Gerry Lynch	3,377	11.1	−3.6
Sinn Féin	Oliver McMullan	2,064	6.8	+1.4
SDLP	Justin McCamphill	2,019	6.6	−0.8
TUV	Sammy Morrison	1,826	6.0	New
Majority		6,770	22.2	−0.8
Turnout		30,502	50.7	−3.8
Registered electors		60,204		
DUP hold		Swing	+0.2	

=== Elections in the 2000s ===
2005 general election: East Antrim
Party	Candidate	Votes	%	±%
DUP	Sammy Wilson	15,766	49.6	+13.6
UUP	Roy Beggs	8,462	26.6	−9.8
Alliance	Seán Neeson	4,869	15.3	+2.8
SDLP	Danny O'Connor	1,695	5.3	−2.0
Sinn Féin	James McKeown	828	2.6	+0.1
Rainbow Dream Ticket	David Kerr	147	0.5	New
Majority		7,304	23.0	N/A
Turnout		31,767	54.5	−4.6
Registered electors		57,966		
DUP gain from UUP		Swing	−11.7	

2001 general election: East Antrim
Party	Candidate	Votes	%	±%
UUP	Roy Beggs	13,101	36.4	−2.4
DUP	Sammy Wilson	12,973	36.0	+16.5
Alliance	John Mathews	4,483	12.5	−7.7
SDLP	Danny O'Connor	2,641	7.3	+2.7
Independent	Lindsay Mason	1,092	3.0	−0.3
Sinn Féin	Janette Graffan	903	2.5	+0.9
NI Conservatives	Alan Greer	807	2.2	−4.6
Majority		128	0.4	−18.2
Turnout		36,000	59.1	+0.8
Registered electors		60,897		
UUP hold		Swing	−0.5	

=== Elections in the 1990s ===
1997 general election: East Antrim
Party	Candidate	Votes	%	±%
UUP	Roy Beggs	13,318	38.8	−4.4
Alliance	Sean Neeson	6,929	20.2	−3.1
DUP	Jack McKee	6,682	19.5	−4.8
NI Conservatives	Terence Dick	2,334	6.8	−1.8
PUP	Billy Donaldson	1,757	5.1	New
SDLP	Danny O'Connor	1,576	4.6	New
Independent	Lindsay Mason	1,145	3.3	New
Sinn Féin	Chrissie McAuley	543	1.6	New
Natural Law	Maura McCann	69	0.2	−0.4
Majority		6,389	18.6	−0.3
Turnout		34,353	58.3	−3.9
Registered electors		59,032		
UUP hold		Swing	+0.1	

1992 general election: East Antrim
Party	Candidate	Votes	%	±%
UUP	Roy Beggs	16,966	43.2	−28.4
DUP	Nigel Dodds	9,544	24.3	New
Alliance	Sean Neeson	9,132	23.3	−2.3
NI Conservatives	Myrtle Margaretta Boal	3,359	8.6	New
Natural Law	Andrea Palmer	250	0.6	New
Majority		7,422	18.9	−27.1
Turnout		39,251	62.4	+7.2
Registered electors		62,864		
UUP hold		Swing		

=== Elections in the 1980s ===
1987 general election: East Antrim
Party	Candidate	Votes	%	±%
UUP	Roy Beggs	23,942	71.6	+34.2
Alliance	Seán Neeson	8,582	25.6	+5.6
Workers' Party	Austin Kevin Kelly	936	2.8	+1.3
Majority		15,360	46.0	+45.1
Turnout		33,460	55.2	−9.9
Registered electors		60,587		
UUP hold		Swing		

1986 East Antrim by-election
Party	Candidate	Votes	%	±%
UUP	Roy Beggs	30,386	84.9	+47.5
Alliance	Seán Neeson	5,405	15.1	−4.9
Majority		24,981	69.8	+68.9
Turnout		24,981	59.2	−5.9
Registered electors		60,780		
UUP hold		Swing		

1983 general election: East Antrim
Party	Candidate	Votes	%	±%
UUP	Roy Beggs	14,293	37.4	
DUP	Jim Allister	13,926	36.5	
Alliance	Seán Neeson	7,620	20.0	
SDLP	Michael O'Cleary	1,047	2.7	
Independent	William Anthony Cunning	741	1.9	
Workers' Party	Austin Kevin Kelly	581	1.5	
Majority		367	0.9	
Turnout		38,154	65.1	
Registered electors		58,671		
UUP win (new seat)				

=== Elections in the 1910s ===
1919 East Antrim by-election
Party	Candidate	Votes	%	±%
Ind. Unionist	George Boyle Hanna	8,714	48.3	New
Irish Unionist	William Agnew Moore	7,549	41.8	−52.8
Independent	Charles McFerran Legg	1,778	9.9	New
Majority		1,165	6.5	N/A
Turnout		24,798	72.7	+7.9
Registered electors		24,798		
Ind. Unionist gain from Irish Unionist		Swing		

1918 general election: East Antrim
Party	Candidate	Votes	%	±%
Irish Unionist	Robert McCalmont	15,206	94.6	N/A
Sinn Féin	Daniel Dumigan	861	5.4	New
Majority		14,345	89.2	N/A
Turnout		16,067	64.8	N/A
Registered electors		24,798		
Irish Unionist hold		Swing		

1913 East Antrim by-election
Party	Candidate	Votes	%	±%
Irish Unionist	Robert McCalmont	Unopposed		
Registered electors				
Irish Unionist hold				

December 1910 general election: East Antrim
Party	Candidate	Votes	%	±%
Irish Unionist	James McCalmont	Unopposed		
Registered electors				
Irish Unionist hold				

January 1910 general election: East Antrim
Party	Candidate	Votes	%	±%
Irish Unionist	James McCalmont	Unopposed		
Registered electors				
Irish Unionist hold				

=== Elections in the 1900s ===
1906 general election: East Antrim
Party	Candidate	Votes	%	±%
Irish Unionist	James McCalmont	4,496	67.7	+10.3
Russellite Unionist	Henry Rosere Beddoes	2,145	32.3	New
Majority		2,351	35.4	+20.5
Turnout		6,641	77.2	+7.0
Registered electors		8,606		
Irish Unionist hold		Swing		

1900 general election: East Antrim
Party	Candidate	Votes	%	±%
Irish Unionist	James McCalmont	3,582	57.45	N/A
Ind. Unionist	James King-Kerr	2,653	42.55	New
Majority		929	14.90	N/A
Turnout		6,235	70.17	N/A
Registered electors		8,886		
Irish Unionist hold		Swing		

=== Elections in the 1890s ===
1895 general election: East Antrim
Party	Candidate	Votes	%	±%
Irish Unionist	James McCalmont	Unopposed		
Registered electors				
Irish Unionist hold				

1892 general election: East Antrim
Party	Candidate	Votes	%	±%
Irish Unionist	James McCalmont	Unopposed		
Registered electors				
Irish Unionist hold				

=== Elections in the 1880s ===
1886 general election: East Antrim
Party	Candidate	Votes	%	±%
Irish Conservative	James McCalmont	Unopposed		
Registered electors		8,773		
Irish Conservative hold				

1885 general election: East Antrim
Party	Candidate	Votes	%	±%
Irish Conservative	James McCalmont	4,180	66.5	
Liberal	Marriott Robert Dalway	2,105	33.5	
Majority		2,075	33.0	
Turnout		6,285	71.6	
Registered electors		8,773		
Irish Conservative win (new seat)				

== See also ==
- List of parliamentary constituencies in Northern Ireland

== Bibliography ==
- Walker, Brian M., ed. (1978). Parliamentary Election Results in Ireland, 1801–1922. Dublin: Royal Irish Academy. ISBN 0901714127.
- Stenton, M.; Lees, S., eds. (1978). Who's Who of British members of parliament: Volume II 1886–1918. The Harvester Press.
