= Mid Antrim =

Mid Antrim may refer to:

- The central part of County Antrim
- Mid Antrim (Northern Ireland Parliament constituency)
- Mid Antrim (UK Parliament constituency)
