= Senator McAllister =

Senator McAllister may refer to:

- Matthew Hall McAllister (1800–1865), Georgia State Senate
- Norman H. McAllister (born 1951), Vermont State Senate
- Thomas Stanislaus McAllister (1878–1950), Northern Irish Senate
- William M. McAllister (1896–1986), Oregon State Senate

== See also ==
- Hill McAlister (1875–1959), Tennessee State Senate
