= Ballymoney Town Hall =

Municipal Building in Ballymoney, Northern Ireland

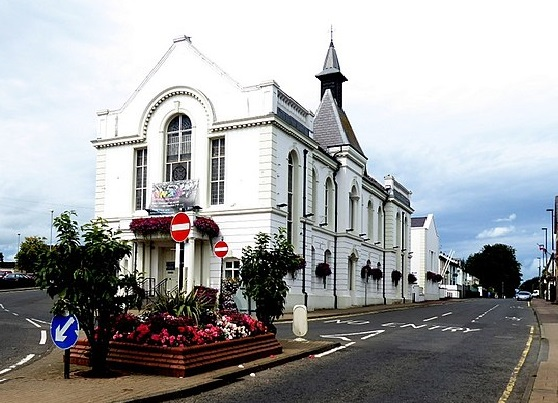
- Ballymoney Town Hall

- Shown in Northern Ireland
- 55.0716°N 6.5183°W
- Location: High Street, Ballymoney

History
- Built: 1866

Site notes
- Architectural style: Italianate style

Listed Building – Grade B1
- Official name: Town Hall
- Designated: 17 July 1978
- Reference no.: HB 04/15/006

Ballymoney Town Hall is a municipal structure in the High Street, Ballymoney, County Antrim, Northern Ireland. The structure, which incorporates a local history museum, is a Grade B1 listed building.

== History ==
The first municipal building in Ballymoney was the market hall in Charlotte Street which was erected on the initiative of Randal William MacDonnell, 6th Earl of Antrim, in 1775. It was the venue for the trials and subsequent executions of several of the United Irishmen during the Irish Rebellion of 1798. In the early 1860s, the new town commissioners, who had been appointed in 1858, decided to procure assembly rooms for the town which would be financed by public subscription: the site they selected was on the west side of the High Street.

The new building was designed in the Italianate style, built in red brick at a cost of £1,300 and was completed in August 1866. The original design involved an asymmetrical main frontage with six bays facing onto the High Street; the third bay from the left, which slightly projected forward, featured, on the ground floor, a doorway flanked by Doric order colonettes supporting a round headed architrave with a keystone and, on the first floor, a deeply recessed window also flanked by Doric order colonettes supporting a round headed architrave with a keystone. The two bays on the left and the three bays on the right featured segmental windows with keystones on the ground floor and round headed windows with architraves and keystones on the first floor. At roof level, there was a modillioned cornice and a central pyramid-shaped roof surmounted by a louvered turret. Internally, the principal rooms were the main assembly room, a library, offices for the town commissioners and a museum.

In October 1869, the town hall was the venue for a meeting which led, a week later, to the founding of the Route Tenants' Defence Association, an organisation which campaigned for tenant rights across Ulster. The area was advanced to the status of an urban district with the assembly rooms, thereafter referred to as the town hall, as its headquarters in 1899. Significant speakers at the new town hall in the early 20th century included the Irish nationalist, Roger Casement, who, in October 1913, delivered his maiden political speech in which he advocated lawful opposition to the provincial government led by Sir Edward Carson. In September 1914, at the start of the First World War, many recruits were enrolled for service in the 12th (Service) Battalion (Central Antrim) Royal Irish Rifles at the town hall before departing for service on the Western Front.

In the early 1930s, the building was substantially re-modelled and extended with an extra bay to the south and two extra bays to the north, fenestrated by full height windows with round headed architraves and keystones. The re-modelling also involved the building being coated in a white stucco finish and, following the re-modelling, the building was re-opened by the former Member of the Northern Ireland Parliament, Robert Megaw, on 16 February 1934. The building continued to serve as the meeting place of the urban district council for much of the 20th century, but ceased to be the local seat of government after the enlarged Ballymoney District Council was formed with its offices at Radia House in Charles Street in 1973. An extensive programme of refurbishment works, which involved the creation of new space for the museum and for the tourist information centre, was completed in 2005. Key exhibits in the museum include a sword which belong to the United Irishman, John Nevin, who took part in the Irish Rebellion of 1798.
