= 1970 South Antrim by-election =

The 1970 South Antrim by-election of 16 April 1970 resulted in the loss of a seat from the Ulster Unionist Party to the much smaller Protestant Unionist Party.

In the 1969 General Election the previous MP, the comparatively liberal Richard Ferguson, handily beat his only opponent, the Protestant Unionist William Beattie. Although the Ulster Unionist candidate was relatively hardline, losing his previous seat to the pro O'Neill unofficial Unionists.

Beattie first came to public attention in 1966 after he took over Paisley's Ulster Hall rallies while he was imprisoned for unlawful assembly.

== Result ==
South Antrim by-election, 1970
Party	Candidate	Votes	%	±%
Protestant Unionist	William Beattie	7,137	35.16	+1.90
UUP	W. J. Morgan	6,179	30.44	−36.30
Independent	David Corkey	5,212	25.67	New
NI Labour	Adrian Whitby	1,773	8.73	New
Majority		958	4.72	N/A
Turnout		28,633	70.90	+5.61
Protestant Unionist gain from UUP		Swing		

== Previous result ==
General Election 24 February 1969: Antrim South
Party	Candidate	Votes	%	±%
UUP	Richard Ferguson	10,761	66.74	−18.38
Protestant Unionist	William Beattie	5,362	33.26	New
Majority		5,399	33.48	−36.75
Turnout		24,693	65.29	+15.81
UUP hold		Swing		
