= Our Lady of Lourdes High School, Ballymoney =

Our Lady of Lourdes School Ballymoney

Location
- Castle Street; Ballymoney, BT53 6JX; Northern Ireland; 55.06696°N 6.521633°W

Information
- Type: Secondary School
- Motto: Caring, Sharing, Learning together to meet the future
- Religious affiliation: Roman Catholic
- Established: 1964
- Local authority: Education Authority (North Eastern)
- Chairperson: Gregor Kerr
- Principal: Simon Smyth
- Staff: 140 approx.
- Gender: co-educational
- Age: 11 to 16
- Enrollment: 400 approx
- Colour
- Website: ourladyoflourdesballymoney.com

Our Lady of Lourdes School is a secondary school in Ballymoney, County Antrim, Northern Ireland.

== Academics ==
The school offers subjects at GCSE and A-Level. It partners with the neighbouring Ballymoney High School and Dalriada School for projects and the delivery of some subjects.

== Extra curriculum ==
The school offers sports including hurling, netball, Gaelic Football, soccer, camogie, athletics, table tennis, hockey and rugby, and arts activities including music, dance, drama, glee choir and Irish Dancing.

== Inspection ==
The standard inspection of the school by the Education and Training Inspectorate in 2015 found the school's overall effectiveness to have a high level of capacity for sustained improvement, and achievements and standards, provision for learning, and leadership and management all to be very good. The report described the school's performance in GCSE English language, history and mathematics at grades A*-C as significantly above average and the standards in GCSE English language as outstanding.
