= 1919 East Antrim by-election =

UK Parliamentary by-election

- 27 May 1919
- Turnout: 72.7%
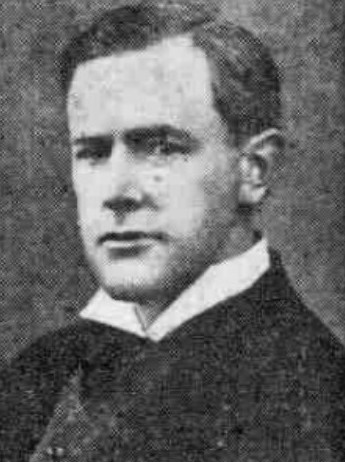
		UUU	Ind
Candidate	George Hanna	William Moore	Charles Legg
Party	Ind. Unionist	Irish Unionist	Independent
Alliance		Coalition
Popular vote	8,714	7,549	1,778
Percentage	48.3%	41.8%	9.9%
Swing	New	▼52.8%	New
MP before election
Robert McCalmont
Irish Unionist
Subsequent MP
George Hanna
Ind. Unionist

The 1919 East Antrim by-election was held on 27 May 1919. The by-election was held due to the appointment of Commander of the Irish guards of the incumbent Irish Unionist MP, Robert McCalmont. It was won by the Independent Unionist candidate George Hanna.

== Result ==
1919 East Antrim by-election
Party	Candidate	Votes	%	±%
Ind. Unionist	George Hanna	8,714	48.3	New
Irish Unionist	William Moore	7,549	41.8	–52.8
Independent	Charles Legg	1,778	9.9	New
Majority		1,165	6.5	N/A
Turnout		24,798	72.7	+7.9
Registered electors				
Ind. Unionist gain from Irish Unionist		Swing		
