= Patrick Boyle (writer) =

Irish writer

Patrick Boyle (11 April 1905–7 February 1982) was an Irish novelist.

Boyle was born in 1905 in Ballymoney, County Antrim. He worked for the Ulster Bank in County Donegal and Wexford. He began writing when he was in his forties. His first collection of short stories, At Night All Cats are Grey, was published in 1966. He also wrote a novel, Like Any Other Man, published in the same year. These two books were followed by two more collections of stories, All Looks Yellow to the Jaundiced Eye (1969), and A View from Calvary (1976). He was a member of the Irish Academy of Letters. He died in 1982.

== Sources ==
- Peter Guy: Novelist in Oblivion: Patrick Boyle page 145
- Dictionary of Ulster Biography
- Extract from David Pierce: Irish Writing in the Twentieth Century
