= Ballymoney High School =

Coordinates: 55.068°N 6.503°W

Information
- School type: Secondary school
- Enrollment: c.660 (2012)
- Website: www.ballymoneyhigh.org.uk

Ballymoney High School is a secondary school located in Ballymoney, County Antrim, Northern Ireland. As of 2012, it had an enrollment of over 660 pupils and an average annual intake of approximately 130 new pupils each year.

In 2016, a new expansion of the school was built, and in 2017 it was officially named the 'Holmes wing'. It was named after Mollie Holmes OBE, a retired mayor of Ballymoney who died at age 101.

== Notable alumni ==
Past pupils of the school include Stephen Carson (an association football player with Glasgow Rangers) and Mervyn Storey (DUP politician).
