= Robert Simpson (Northern Ireland politician) =

Unionist politician in Northern Ireland (1923–1997)

Minister for Community Relations
- In office 1969–1971

Member of Parliament for Mid Antrim
- In office 1953–1973

Personal details
- Born: 3 July 1923; Ballymena, Northern Ireland
- Died: 3 April 1997 (aged 73)
- Political party: Unionist
- Education: Queen's University Belfast

Robert Simpson (3 July 1923 – 8 April 1997) was a unionist politician in Northern Ireland.

== Early life and education ==
Born in Ballymena and often known as Bob Simpson, Simpson studied medicine at Queen's University Belfast before setting up his own practice.

== Political career ==
He joined the Ulster Unionist Party (UUP) in 1952, and was selected as the party's candidate for Mid Antrim. He won the seat, unopposed, at the 1953 Northern Ireland general election, and held it at each election thereafter, not facing a single opponent until 1969.

A strong support of Terence O'Neill's reforms, Simpson was appointed briefly as Additional Parliamentary Secretary in the Department of the Prime Minister, and then as the first Minister for Community Relations in late 1969. He resigned from the freemasons and from the Orange Order in an attempt to appear impartial. In the role, he organised a series of dinner parties with attendees from both nationalist and unionist backgrounds, and through these developed a friendship with Seamus Heaney.

When Brian Faulkner became Prime Minister of Northern Ireland in 1971, Simpson was removed from his ministerial post and, the following year, Simpson resigned from the UUP.

Simpson spent the remainder of his life writing on medicine, agriculture and travel, developing an arboretum and organising the Ballymena Music Festival.

Parliament of Northern Ireland
Preceded by Robert Nichol Wilson	Member of Parliament for Mid Antrim; 1953–1973	Parliament abolished
Political offices
New office	Additional Private Secretary, Department of the Prime Minister (Northern Ireland); 1969	Office abolished
New office	Minister for Community Relations; 1969–1971	Succeeded by David Bleakley
