= South Antrim (Northern Ireland Parliament constituency) =

Constituency of the Northern Ireland Parliament (1929–1973)

Coordinates: 54.505°N 6.066°W

- Former County constituency for the Parliament of Northern Ireland
- South Antrim shown within Northern Ireland

Former constituency
- Created: 1929
- Abolished: 1973
- Election method: First past the post

South Antrim was a constituency of the Parliament of Northern Ireland.

The House of Commons (Method of Voting and Redistribution of Seats) Act (Northern Ireland) 1929 introduced first-past-the-post elections for 48 single-member constituencies (including Antrim South).

== Boundaries and boundary changes ==
This constituency was one of seven county divisions in County Antrim from 1929, and, after 1969, one of nine. The changes in the vicinity of Belfast affected the boundaries of this division.

It comprised (in terms of then local government units) part of the rural district of Lisburn and the whole of the urban district of Lisburn. In 1969, the part of the rural district closest to Belfast became the new seat of Antrim, Larkfield.

Antrim South returned one member of Parliament from 1929 until the Parliament of Northern Ireland was temporarily suspended in 1972, and then formally abolished in 1973.

== Politics ==
County Antrim (except for parts of Belfast) is a strongly unionist area. There was never the slightest chance of a republican or nationalist candidate being elected in a single-member Antrim county constituency. Antrim South was not an exception.

From the Northern Ireland general election of 1929, the Antrim South division was an extremely safe Unionist seat for the rest of the existence of the Northern Ireland Parliament.

== Members of Parliament ==
| Election | Member | Party |
|---|---|---|
| 1929 | John Milne Barbour | Ulster Unionist |
| 1951 | Brian McConnell | Ulster Unionist |
| 1968 | Richard Ferguson | Ulster Unionist |
| 1970 | Rev. William Beattie | Protestant Unionist |
| 1971 | Rev. William Beattie | Democratic Unionist |
| 1973 | constituency abolished | |

== Elections ==
The elections in this constituency took place using the first past the post electoral system.

General Election 22 May 1929: Antrim South
| Party | Candidate | Votes | % | ±% |
|---|---|---|---|---|
| UUP | John Milne Barbour | Unopposed | N/A | N/A |
| UUP win (new seat) | | | | |

General Election 30 November 1933: Antrim South
| Party | Candidate | Votes | % | ±% |
|---|---|---|---|---|
| UUP | John Milne Barbour | Unopposed | N/A | N/A |
| UUP hold | | Swing | N/A | |

General Election 9 February 1938: Antrim South
| Party | Candidate | Votes | % | ±% |
|---|---|---|---|---|
| UUP | John Milne Barbour | Unopposed | N/A | N/A |
| UUP hold | | Swing | N/A | |

General Election 14 June 1945: Antrim South
| Party | Candidate | Votes | % | ±% |
|---|---|---|---|---|
| UUP | John Milne Barbour | Unopposed | N/A | N/A |
| UUP hold | | Swing | N/A | |

General Election 10 February 1949: Antrim South
| Party | Candidate | Votes | % | ±% |
|---|---|---|---|---|
| UUP | John Milne Barbour | Unopposed | N/A | N/A |
| UUP hold | | Swing | N/A | |

- Death of Barbour

South Antrim by-election, 1951
| Party | Candidate | Votes | % | ±% |
|---|---|---|---|---|
| UUP | Brian McConnell | Unopposed | N/A | N/A |
| UUP hold | | Swing | N/A | |

General Election 22 October 1953: Antrim South
| Party | Candidate | Votes | % | ±% |
|---|---|---|---|---|
| UUP | Brian McConnell | Unopposed | N/A | N/A |
| UUP hold | | Swing | N/A | |

General Election 20 March 1958: Antrim South
| Party | Candidate | Votes | % | ±% |
|---|---|---|---|---|
| UUP | Brian McConnell | Unopposed | N/A | N/A |
| UUP hold | | Swing | N/A | |

General Election 31 May 1962: Antrim South
| Party | Candidate | Votes | % | ±% |
|---|---|---|---|---|
| UUP | Brian McConnell | Unopposed | N/A | N/A |
| UUP hold | | Swing | N/A | |

General Election 25 November 1965: Antrim South
| Party | Candidate | Votes | % | ±% |
|---|---|---|---|---|
| UUP | Brian McConnell | 14,491 | 77.89 | N/A |
| NI Labour | Sydney Stewart | 4,113 | 22.11 | New |
| Majority | | 10,378 | 55.78 | N/A |
| Turnout | | 34,419 | 54.05 | N/A |
| UUP hold | | Swing | N/A | |

- Resignation of McConnell

South Antrim by-election, 1968
| Party | Candidate | Votes | % | ±% |
|---|---|---|---|---|
| UUP | Richard Ferguson | 16,288 | 85.12 | +7.23 |
| NI Labour | John Coulthard | 2,848 | 14.88 | −7.23 |
| Majority | | 13,440 | 70.24 | +14.46 |
| Turnout | | 38,672 | 49.48 | −4.57 |
| UUP hold | | Swing | | |

- Boundary change

General Election 24 February 1969: Antrim South
| Party | Candidate | Votes | % | ±% |
|---|---|---|---|---|
| UUP | Richard Ferguson | 10,761 | 66.74 | −18.38 |
| Protestant Unionist | William Beattie | 5,362 | 33.26 | New |
| Majority | | 5,399 | 33.48 | −36.75 |
| Turnout | | 24,693 | 65.29 | +15.81 |
| UUP hold | | Swing | | |

- Resignation of Ferguson

South Antrim by-election, 1970
| Party | Candidate | Votes | % | ±% |
|---|---|---|---|---|
| Protestant Unionist | William Beattie | 7,137 | 35.16 | +1.90 |
| UUP | W. J. Morgan | 6,179 | 30.44 | −36.30 |
| Independent | David Corkey | 5,212 | 25.67 | New |
| NI Labour | Adrian Whitby | 1,773 | 8.73 | New |
| Majority | | 958 | 4.72 | N/A |
| Turnout | | 28,633 | 70.90 | +5.61 |
| Protestant Unionist gain from UUP | | Swing | | |

- Parliament prorogued 30 March 1972 and abolished 18 July 1973
