= Louis Joseph Walsh =

Louis Joseph Walsh (1880 – 26 December 1942) was an Irish republican activist, judge and author.

Born in Maghera in County Londonderry, Walsh was educated at St Columb's College and University College Dublin, where he joined the Gaelic League. His sister was Helena Concannon. He was a contemporary of James Joyce, who caricatured him as Hughes in Stephen Hero.

Walsh qualified as a solicitor, initially practising in Maghera, before moving to Ballycastle, County Antrim. He wrote three plays in this period, The Pope in Killybuck, The Guileless Saxon and The Next Time: a story of Forty-eight.

Walsh did not participate in the Easter Rising, but the events radicalised him, and he joined Sinn Féin, standing unsuccessfully for the party in South Londonderry at the 1918 general election. In 1920, troops raided his office, planning to intern him, but he had already fled. After spending time on the run in the Glens of Antrim, he was eventually captured back in Maghera and interned. Although conditions were generally tough, he was able to direct a performance of The Pope in Killybuck, performed by other internees. He stood unsuccessfully in Antrim at the 1921 Stormont election, and was released around the time of the election.

On release, Walsh moved to Letterkenny in County Donegal, where he was the first district judge appointed by the Dáil. He wrote short stories and some non-fiction works, and also contributed columns to newspapers in support of traditional Catholic values.
