= Mid Antrim (UK Parliament constituency) =

Parliamentary constituency in the United Kingdom, 1885–1922

- Former county constituency for the House of Commons

1885–1922
- Created from: Antrim
- Replaced by: Antrim

Mid Antrim was a UK Parliament constituency in Ireland which returned one Member of Parliament from 1885 to 1922, using the first past the post electoral system.

== Boundaries and boundary changes ==
This county constituency comprised the central part of County Antrim, specifically the baronies of Glenarm Lower, Toome Lower, part of the barony of Antrim Lower (those parts in the parishes of Ahoghill, Ballyclug, Glenwhirry, Racavan and Skerry, and the townlands of Appletree, Ballee, Ballycowan, Carnaghts, Crevilly Valley, Cromkill, Slaght, Tullaghgarley and Tullynamullan in the parish of Connor), and that part of the barony of Antrim Upper in the parish of Ahoghill. It was bounded to the north by Antrim North, to the west by Londonderry South, to the south by Antrim South and Antrim East and to the east by the sea.

Prior to the 1885 United Kingdom general election and from the dissolution of Parliament in 1922 the area was part of the Antrim constituency.

In terms of the local government areas the constituency comprised parts of the rural districts of Ballymena, Ballymoney and Larne. The division also included the whole of the urban district of Ballymena.

== Politics ==
The constituency was a predominantly Unionist area. It was also a safe seat for the O'Neill family. All three of the MPs who represented the constituency were related. In 1918 the Unionists defeated Sinn Féin by about 4 to 1.

From 1886 to 1974 the Conservative and Unionist members of the United Kingdom House of Commons formed a single Parliamentary party.

== The First Dáil ==
Sinn Féin contested the 1918 general election on the platform that instead of taking up any seats they won in the United Kingdom Parliament, they would establish a revolutionary assembly in Dublin. In republican theory every MP elected in Ireland was a potential Deputy to this assembly. In practice only the Sinn Féin members accepted the offer.

The revolutionary First Dáil assembled on 21 January 1919 and last met on 10 May 1921. The First Dáil, according to a resolution passed on 10 May 1921, was formally dissolved on the assembling of the Second Dáil. This took place on 16 August 1921.

In 1921 Sinn Féin decided to use the UK authorised elections for the Northern Ireland House of Commons and the House of Commons of Southern Ireland as a poll for the Irish Republic's Second Dáil. Elections to both assemblies were conducted not under the first past the post system, but instead under the Single Transferable Vote. Mid Antrim was incorporated in a seven-member constituency of Antrim.

== Members of Parliament ==
Election	Member	Party
1885	Hon. Robert Torrens O'Neill	Conservative
1891	Hon. Robert Torrens O'Neill	Irish Unionist
Jan 1910	Hon. Arthur O'Neill	Irish Unionist
1915 (b)	Hon. Hugh O'Neill	Irish Unionist
May 1921	Hon. Hugh O'Neill	Ulster Unionist
1922	constituency abolished	

== Elections ==
=== Elections in the 1910s ===
1918 general election: Mid Antrim
Party	Candidate	Votes	%	±%
Irish Unionist	Hugh O'Neill	10,711	79.3	N/A
Sinn Féin	Joseph Connolly	2,791	20.7	New
Majority		7,920	58.6	N/A
Turnout		13,502	74.9	N/A
Irish Unionist hold		Swing	N/A	

By-Election 17 February 1915: Mid Antrim
Party	Candidate	Votes	%	±%
Irish Unionist	Hugh O'Neill	Unopposed		
Irish Unionist hold				

General election 8 December 1910: Mid Antrim
Party	Candidate	Votes	%	±%
Irish Unionist	Arthur O'Neill	Unopposed		
Irish Unionist hold				

General election 18 January 1910: Mid Antrim
Party	Candidate	Votes	%	±%
Irish Unionist	Arthur O'Neill	Unopposed		
Irish Unionist hold				

=== Elections in the 1900s ===
General election 22 January 1906: Mid Antrim
Party	Candidate	Votes	%	±%
Irish Unionist	Robert Torrens O'Neill	3,367	56.6	N/A
Russellite Unionist	John Hamilton Verschoyle	2,577	43.4	New
Majority		790	13.2	N/A
Turnout		5,944	81.0	N/A
Registered electors		7,337		
Irish Unionist hold		Swing	N/A	

General election 5 October 1900: Mid Antrim
Party	Candidate	Votes	%	±%
Irish Unionist	Robert Torrens O'Neill	Unopposed		
Irish Unionist hold				

=== Elections in the 1890s ===
General election 19 July 1895: Mid Antrim
Party	Candidate	Votes	%	±%
Irish Unionist	Robert Torrens O'Neill	Unopposed		
Irish Unionist hold				

General election 8 July 1892: Mid Antrim
Party	Candidate	Votes	%	±%
Irish Unionist	Robert Torrens O'Neill	Unopposed		
Irish Unionist hold				

=== Elections in the 1880s ===
General election 10 July 1886: Mid Antrim
Party	Candidate	Votes	%	±%
Irish Conservative	Robert Torrens O'Neill	4,631	83.2	+24.7
Liberal	James Hamilton McKelvey	933	16.8	−24.7
Majority		3,698	66.4	+49.4
Turnout		5,564	67.0	−11.8
Registered electors		8,307		
Irish Conservative hold		Swing	+24.7	

General election 2 December 1885: Mid Antrim
Party	Candidate	Votes	%	±%
Irish Conservative	Robert Torrens O'Neill	3,832	58.5	
Liberal	Thomas Alexander Dickson	2,713	41.5	
Majority		1,119	17.0	
Turnout		6,545	78.8	
Registered electors		8,307		
Irish Conservative win (new seat)				

=== See also ===
- List of Irish constituencies
- List of UK Parliament Constituencies in Ireland and Northern Ireland
- List of MPs elected in the 1918 United Kingdom general election
