= Unbought Tenants' Association =

Agrarian pressure groups in Ireland

Unbought Tenants' Association and Unpurchased Tenants' Association were labels for agrarian pressure groups in Ireland in the 1910s and 1920s. Under the Irish Land Acts, most farmers in the preceding decades had bought the freehold to their farms; the Association represented the interests of remaining tenant farmers.

In the House of Commons in 1913, William O'Brien mentioned "a map prepared by the Unpurchased Tenants' Association of East Down, showing how the districts purchased at greatly reduced annuities are surrounded on all sides by townlands still unpurchased, where the farmers suffer from high rents and uncertainty as to the future".

In 1920, the Irish Farmers' Union (IFU) founded an All-Ireland Unpurchased Tenants' Association to agitate for purchase and organise rent strikes. This created tension in the Irish Free State among the large landowners in the IFU, between unionists anxious to sell up and emigrate to Great Britain and those who wished to remain on their Irish estates. The Unpurchased Tenants' Association's opposition to the Free State's Land Act 1923 was more extreme than that of the Farmers' Party; James Hoban ran unsuccessfully in Galway in the 1923 general election under the "Unpurchased Tenants' Association" label, against Farmers' Party candidates. Michael Heffernan was a member of the Unpurchased Tenants' Association when elected for the Farmers' Party in the same election.

In the 1925 Northern Ireland election, George Henderson was elected under the Unbought Tenants label for Antrim, which Graham Walker attributes to a "strain of agrarian Presbyterian radicalism" antagonistic to the Ulster Unionist Party. Robert Nathaniel Boyd, previously president of the Unbought Tenants, became first president of the Ulster Liberal Party. Henderson stood unsuccessfully for the Ulster Liberal Party in the 1929 Stormont election. Ulster Unionist John Maginnis, opposing the use of the single transferable vote for the 1973 local elections, stated that in the 1920s '[i]t was discovered that under this system the "Don't knows" usually vote for some obscure person. One party which secured a seat in Parliament was the Unbought Tenants.'
