= 1915 Mid Antrim by-election =

UK Parliamentary by-election

The 1915 Mid Antrim by-election was held on 17 February 1915. The by-election was held due to the incumbent Irish Unionist MP, Arthur O'Neill, being killed in action at Klein Zillebeke ridge during the First Battle of Ypres in the First World War. It was won by his brother the Irish Unionist candidate Hugh O'Neill, who was elected unopposed.
