= Bannside (Northern Ireland Parliament constituency) =

Constituency of the Northern Ireland Parliament (1929–1973)

Coordinates: 54.846°N 6.329°W

- Former County constituency for the Parliament of Northern Ireland
- Bannside shown within Northern Ireland

Former constituency
- Created: 1929
- Abolished: 1973
- Election method: First past the post

Bannside was a single-member county constituency of the Parliament of Northern Ireland.

== Boundaries and Boundary Changes ==
This was a division of County Antrim. Before 1929 it was part of the seven-member Antrim constituency. The constituency sent one MP to the House of Commons of Northern Ireland from 1929 until the Parliament was temporarily suspended in 1972, and then formally abolished in 1973.

In terms of the then local government areas the constituency in 1929 comprised parts of the Rural Districts of Antrim, Ballymena and Ballymoney.

After boundary changes in 1969 the constituency included parts of the same Rural Districts but Bannside was extended to take in the northern part of the 1929–1969 Antrim Borough constituency.

== Members of Parliament ==
Election	Member	Party
1929	George Charles Gillespie Young	Ulster Unionist Party
1933	George Charles Gillespie Young	Ulster Unionist Party
1938	George Charles Gillespie Young	Ulster Unionist Party
1939	Malcolm William Patrick	Ulster Unionist Party
1945	Malcolm William Patrick	Ulster Unionist Party
1946	Terence O'Neill	Ulster Unionist Party
1949	Terence O'Neill	Ulster Unionist Party
1953	Terence O'Neill	Ulster Unionist Party
1958	Terence O'Neill	Ulster Unionist Party
1962	Terence O'Neill	Ulster Unionist Party
1965	Terence O'Neill	Ulster Unionist Party
1969	Terence O'Neill	Ulster Unionist Party
1970	Ian Paisley	Protestant Unionist
1971	Ian Paisley	Democratic Unionist
1973	constituency abolished	

== Elections ==
The parliamentary representatives of the division were elected using the first past the post system.

General Election 22 May 1929: Bannside
Party	Candidate	Votes	%	±%
UUP	George Charles Gillespie Young	5,931	54.31	
Ulster Liberal	George Henderson	4,174	38.22	
Independent Labour	William Ervine	816	7.47	
Majority		1,757	16.09	
Turnout		16,802	65.00	
UUP win (new seat)				

General Election 30 November 1933: Bannside
Party	Candidate	Votes	%	±%
UUP	George Charles Gillespie Young	Unopposed	N/A	N/A
UUP hold		Swing	N/A	

General Election 9 February 1938: Bannside
Party	Candidate	Votes	%	±%
UUP	George Charles Gillespie Young	Unopposed	N/A	N/A
UUP hold		Swing	N/A	

- Death of Young

1939 Bannside by-election
Party	Candidate	Votes	%	±%
UUP	Malcolm Patrick	Unopposed	N/A	N/A
UUP hold		Swing	N/A	

General Election 14 June 1945: Bannside
Party	Candidate	Votes	%	±%
UUP	Malcolm Patrick	5,029	62.80	N/A
Ind. Unionist	A. J. Gillespie	2,979	37.20	New
Majority		2,050	25.60	N/A
Turnout		16,461	48.65	N/A
UUP hold		Swing	N/A	

- Death of Patrick

1946 Bannside by-election
Party	Candidate	Votes	%	±%
UUP	Terence O'Neill	Unopposed	N/A	N/A
UUP hold		Swing	N/A	

General Election 10 February 1949: Bannside
Party	Candidate	Votes	%	±%
UUP	Terence O'Neill	Unopposed	N/A	N/A
UUP hold		Swing	N/A	

General Election 22 October 1953: Bannside
Party	Candidate	Votes	%	±%
UUP	Terence O'Neill	Unopposed	N/A	N/A
UUP hold		Swing	N/A	

General Election 20 March 1958: Bannside
Party	Candidate	Votes	%	±%
UUP	Terence O'Neill	Unopposed	N/A	N/A
UUP hold		Swing	N/A	

General Election 31 May 1962: Bannside
Party	Candidate	Votes	%	±%
UUP	Terence O'Neill	Unopposed	N/A	N/A
UUP hold		Swing	N/A	

General Election 25 November 1965: Bannside
Party	Candidate	Votes	%	±%
UUP	Terence O'Neill	Unopposed	N/A	N/A
UUP hold		Swing	N/A	

- Boundary changes

General Election 24 February 1969: Bannside
Party	Candidate	Votes	%	±%
UUP	Terence O'Neill	7,745	47.27	N/A
Protestant Unionist	Ian Paisley	6,331	38.64	New
People's Democracy	Michael Farrell	2,310	14.10	New
Majority		1,414	8.63	N/A
Turnout		20,635	79.41	N/A
UUP hold		Swing	N/A	

- Resignation of O'Neill

1970 Bannside by-election
Party	Candidate	Votes	%	±%
Protestant Unionist	Ian Paisley	7,981	43.68	+5.04
UUP	Bolton Minford	6,778	37.09	−10.18
NI Labour	Patrick McHugh	3,514	19.23	New
Majority		1,203	6.59	N/A
Turnout		22,954	79.61	+0.20
Protestant Unionist gain from UUP		Swing		

- Parliament prorogued 30 March 1972 and abolished 18 July 1973

== Peerage title ==
When Ian Paisley was created a life peer in 2010, he took his title of Baron Bannside, of North Antrim in the County of Antrim from the constituency he had won in 1970.
