= Mid Antrim (Northern Ireland Parliament constituency) =

Constituency of the Northern Ireland Parliament (1929–1973)

Coordinates: 54.911°N 6.147°W

- Former County constituency for the Parliament of Northern Ireland
- Mid Antrim shown within Northern Ireland

Former constituency
- Created: 1929
- Abolished: 1973
- Election method: First past the post

Mid Antrim was a constituency of the Northern Ireland House of Commons.

The House of Commons (Method of Voting and Redistribution of Seats) Act (Northern Ireland), 1929 introduced first-past-the-post elections for 48 single-member constituencies (including Antrim Mid).

It was a single-member division of County Antrim represented in the Parliament of Northern Ireland. Before 1929, it was part of the seven-member Antrim constituency. The constituency sent one MP to the House of Commons of Northern Ireland from 1929 until the Parliament was temporarily suspended in 1972, and then formally abolished in 1973.

In terms of the then local government areas the constituency in 1929 comprised parts of the rural districts of Ballymena, Ballymoney and Larne. The division also included the whole of the urban district of Ballymena.

== Members of Parliament ==
Election	Member	Party
1929	Robert Crawford	Ulster Unionist
1933	Robert Crawford	Ulster Unionist
1938	John Patrick	Ulster Unionist
1945	John Patrick	Ulster Unionist
1949	Robert Nichol Wilson	Ulster Unionist
1953	Robert Simpson	Ulster Unionist
1958	Robert Simpson	Ulster Unionist
1962	Robert Simpson	Ulster Unionist
1965	Robert Simpson	Ulster Unionist
1969	Robert Simpson	Ulster Unionist
1973	Constituency abolished	

== Election results ==
General Election 22 May 1929: Antrim Mid
Party	Candidate	Votes	%	±%
UUP	Robert Crawford	7,375	68.21	
Independent	James Alexander Gaston	3,437	31.79	
Majority		3,938	36.42	
Turnout		17,857	60.55	
UUP win (new seat)				

General Election 30 November 1933: Antrim Mid
Party	Candidate	Votes	%	±%
UUP	Robert Crawford	7,567	59.37	−8.84
Ind. Unionist	John Woodburn	5,178	40.63	New
Majority		2,389	18.74	−17.68
Turnout		18,152	70.21	+9.66
UUP hold		Swing		

General Election 9 February 1938: Antrim Mid
Party	Candidate	Votes	%	±%
UUP	John Patrick	9,386	67.53	+8.16
Progressive Unionist	Andrew Beggs	4,514	32.47	New
Majority		4,872	35.06	+16.32
Turnout		19,062	72.92	+2.71
UUP hold		Swing		

General Election 14 June 1945: Antrim Mid
Party	Candidate	Votes	%	±%
UUP	Robert Nichol Wilson	Unopposed	N/A	N/A
UUP hold		Swing	N/A	

General Election 10 February 1949: Antrim Mid
Party	Candidate	Votes	%	±%
UUP	Robert Nichol Wilson	Unopposed	N/A	N/A
UUP hold		Swing	N/A	

General Election 22 October 1953: Antrim Mid
Party	Candidate	Votes	%	±%
UUP	Robert Simpson	Unopposed	N/A	N/A
UUP hold		Swing	N/A	

General Election 20 March 1958: Antrim Mid
Party	Candidate	Votes	%	±%
UUP	Robert Simpson	Unopposed	N/A	N/A
UUP hold		Swing	N/A	

General Election 31 May 1962: Antrim Mid
Party	Candidate	Votes	%	±%
UUP	Robert Simpson	Unopposed	N/A	N/A
UUP hold		Swing	N/A	

General Election 25 November 1965: Antrim Mid
Party	Candidate	Votes	%	±%
UUP	Robert Simpson	Unopposed	N/A	N/A
UUP hold		Swing	N/A	

General Election 24 February 1969: Antrim Mid
Party	Candidate	Votes	%	±%
UUP	Robert Simpson	10,249	82.83	N/A
NI Labour	Robert Hugh Galbraith	2,124	17.17	New
Majority		8,125	65.66	N/A
Turnout		21,992	56.26	N/A
UUP hold		Swing	N/A	

- Parliament prorogued 30 March 1972 and abolished 18 July 1973
