= William Beattie (politician) =

Northern Irish clergyman and politician (1942–2025)

Deputy Leader of the Democratic Unionist Party
- In office 30 September 1971 – 31 May 1980
- Leader: Ian Paisley
- Preceded by: Office created
- Succeeded by: Peter Robinson

Chairman of the Democratic Unionist Party
- In office 1973–1980
- Leader: Ian Paisley
- Preceded by: Desmond Boal
- Succeeded by: James McClure

Deputy leader of the Protestant Unionist Party
- In office 1969–1971
- Leader: Ian Paisley
- Preceded by: Office created
- Succeeded by: Office abolished

Member of Lisburn City Council
- In office 19 May 1993 – 7 June 2001
- Preceded by: District created
- Succeeded by: Jonathan Craig
- Constituency: Lisburn Town North
- In office 15 May 1985 – 19 May 1993
- Preceded by: District created
- Succeeded by: Anne Marie Armstrong
- Constituency: Dunmurry Cross
- In office 18 May 1977 – 15 May 1985
- Preceded by: Robert McNeice
- Succeeded by: District abolished
- Constituency: Lisburn Area E

Member of the Northern Ireland Assembly for South Antrim
- In office 20 October 1982 – 1986
- In office 28 June 1973 – May 1974

Member of the Northern Ireland Constitutional Convention for South Antrim
- In office 1 May 1975 – 6 March 1976

Member of the Northern Ireland Parliament for South Antrim
- In office 1970 – 30 March 1972
- Preceded by: Richard Ferguson
- Succeeded by: Parliament dissolved

Personal details
- Born: 21 September 1942 Ballymena, County Antrim, Northern Ireland
- Died: 13 February 2025 (aged 82)
- Party: Independent Unionist (1997–2001); Democratic Unionist Party (1971–1997)
- Other political affiliations: Protestant Unionist Party (1966–1971)

William John Beattie (21 September 1942 – 13 February 2025) was a Northern Irish minister of religion and unionist politician who was deputy leader of the Democratic Unionist Party (DUP) from its foundation in 1971 until 1980.

== Life and career ==
Beattie grew up in Ballymena. In 1965, he became a student minister at the Dunmurry Free Presbyterian Church, and in 1967 he became a full minister in the Church, led by Ian Paisley. He also joined Paisley's Protestant Unionist Party (PUP), and became the deputy leader. Beattie first came to public attention in 1966 after he took over Paisley's Ulster Hall rallies while he was imprisoned for unlawful assembly.

In 1970, Beattie was elected to the Northern Ireland House of Commons in a by-election in South Antrim. Beattie had stood in the same constituency in the previous year's election but failed to be elected. On the same day, Paisley was elected for Bannside, and the two became the PUP's first Members of Parliament. Journalist W. D. Flackes later commented that these by-elections were "probably the most vital in the history of the Stormont House of Commons".

Beattie stood for Belfast North in the 1970 general election, but came a distant third, behind the Official Unionist Party (OUP) and Labour candidates.

In 1971, the PUP formed the Democratic Unionist Party (DUP), and Beattie retained his post as deputy leader. The Parliament was prorogued in 1972, but Beattie was elected to the Northern Ireland Assembly of 1973, and became deputy chief whip of the United Unionist Assembly Party (UUUC). He was again elected, to the Northern Ireland Constitutional Convention in 1975. However, 1975 saw the beginning of Beattie's fall from Paisley's favour. He seriously damaged his political credibility within hard-line unionism, when, as a member of the three-man UUUC delegation which held talks with the Social Democratic and Labour Party (SDLP), he failed to dissociate himself early enough from Bill Craig's suggestion of having Northern Ireland governed by a voluntary coalition between unionists and nationalists. In early 1976 Beattie was replaced as chairman of the DUP.

Beattie had a reputation for provocative rhetoric: several times he had warned the SDLP not to provoke a "civil war situation or they and their supporters will have to seek refuge in the Republic"; had accused the 1976 peace women of concentrating their efforts "where they would not interfere with terrorist activity"; and had suggested that only "the gallows would bring peace to Ulster".

Beattie was elected to Lisburn District Council in 1977. Beattie's election to the council began what one fellow councillor called "A period of bigoted sectarian confrontations after four years in which Lisburn had a relatively good and moderate reputation". The most infamous clash was the Beattie-led loyalist protest over the building of a new overflow Catholic housing estate at Poleglass on the edge of West Belfast. From his base at Dunmurry, adjacent the proposed scheme, Beattie claimed that 30,000 loyalists were prepared to "fight to the bitter end" to stop the new homes for Catholics, and threatened to sabotage the Housing Executive's allocation of homes to Catholics by setting up "Protestant-only estates". Beattie's campaign was ultimately unsuccessful, aside from one low-key rally addressed by DUP leader Ian Paisley and Official Unionist leader Jim Molyneaux.

In April 1983, Beattie forced the cancellation of Sunday performances by Circus Hoffman by threatening to disrupt them with open-air prayer meetings outside. He also agitated to reinstate a ban on usage of the municipal swimming pool and other public leisure facilities on Sundays. One anti-Catholic outburst from Beattie so embarrassed an Official Unionist member of Lisburn Council that he personally apologised to an SDLP member present. Beattie also objected to library facilities for the predominantly Catholic Twinbrook estate and to planning permission for a health centre in Poleglass.

Peter Robinson later replaced Beattie as DUP Deputy Leader.

In May 1982, the Irish National Liberation Army (INLA) attempted to assassinate Beattie by planting a large bomb at his home. The device failed to detonate and was defused by the British Army.

Beattie was elected to the Northern Ireland Assembly of 1982. Months after being elected, Beattie came to media attention after attempting to stop the Assembly's economic development committee from discussing a proposal from Londonderry Chamber of Commerce for a cross-border industrial development zone in Derry and County Donegal.

Beattie stood in Lagan Valley in the 1983 general election but again failed to win a seat in the British House of Commons. He resigned from the DUP in the mid-1990s and retired as a minister on 31 December 2005.

Beattie died on 13 February 2025, at the age of 82. Writing in Fortnight magazine in 1983, journalist Andy Pollak described Beattie as "one of the last truly unashamed voices of Northern Irish bigotry".

Parliament of Northern Ireland
Preceded by Richard Ferguson	Member of Parliament for South Antrim; 1970–1973	Parliament abolished
Northern Ireland Assembly (1973)
New assembly	Assembly Member for South Antrim; 1973–1974	Assembly abolished
Northern Ireland Constitutional Convention
New convention	Member for South Antrim; 1975–1976	Convention dissolved
Northern Ireland Assembly (1982)
New assembly	MPA for South Antrim; 1982–1986	Assembly abolished
Party political offices
Unknown	Deputy Leader and Chairman of the Protestant Unionist Party; 1969–197	Party dissolved
New political party	Deputy Leader of the Democratic Unionist Party; 1971–1980	Succeeded by Peter Robinson
Preceded by Desmond Boal	Chairman of the Democratic Unionist Party; 1973–1980	Succeeded by James McClure
Preceded by Peter Robinson	General Secretary of the Democratic Unionist Party; 1980–1983	Succeeded by Alan Kane
