= Robert Nichol Wilson =

Politician from Northern Ireland

Robert Nichol Wilson, known as R. N. Wilson, was a unionist politician in Northern Ireland.

Wilson studied at Malvern College and served in the Royal Artillery during World War II. After the war, he became a director of a textile company and joined the Ulster Unionist Party. He was elected in the 1945 Northern Ireland general election in Mid Antrim, holding the seat until he retired in 1953 without ever facing an opponent. From 1948 to 1950, he was the Chairman of Ways and Means and Deputy Speaker of the Northern Ireland House of Commons.

Parliament of Northern Ireland
Preceded by John Patrick	Member of Parliament for Mid Antrim; 1945–1953	Succeeded by Robert Simpson
Preceded by Thomas Bailie	Chairman of Ways and Means and Deputy Speaker of the Northern Ireland House of Commons; 1969–1972	Succeeded by Samuel Hall-Thompson
