= John Patrick (Northern Ireland politician) =

Unionist politician from Northern Ireland

John Patrick (born 1898) was an Ulster Unionist Party politician and soldier. He was elected at the 1938 Northern Ireland general election as a Member of Parliament (MP) for Mid Antrim, and held the seat until the 1945 general election.

Parliament of Northern Ireland
| Preceded by Robert Crawford | MP for Mid Antrim; 1938–1945 | Succeeded by Robert Nichol Wilson |
