= Richard Ferguson (barrister) =

Northern Irish barrister

Richard Ferguson, QC, SC

Member of the Northern Ireland Parliament for South Antrim
- In office 1968–1970
- Preceded by: Brian McConnell
- Succeeded by: William Beattie

Personal details
- Born: 22 August 1935 Derrygonnelly, County Fermanagh, Northern Ireland
- Died: 26 July 2009 (aged 73)
- Political party: Alliance Party (from 1971); Ulster Unionist Party (until 1971)

Richard (Dick) Ferguson QC, SC (22 August 1935 – 26 July 2009) was a Northern Irish barrister and Ulster Unionist Party (UUP) politician.

== Background ==
Born in Derrygonnelly in the west of County Fermanagh, Ferguson was the son of a sergeant in the Royal Ulster Constabulary (RUC), and he later attended Rainey Endowed School in Magherafelt in South Londonderry and Methodist College ('Methody') in Belfast. He went on to study law at Trinity College, Dublin (TCD), and The Queen's University of Belfast. He was called to the Bar in Northern Ireland in 1956 and later in the Republic of Ireland, and from 1972, in England.

== Political career ==
Although he rapidly established a reputation as one of the jurisdiction's ablest young advocates, in 1968, Ferguson was elected to the Parliament of Northern Ireland for the Ulster Unionist Party (UUP), representing South Antrim. He was considered a liberal Unionist and was a supporter of the Prime Minister Terence O'Neill. Before his election, he had called for local government reform including a one man, one vote system. O'Neill in his autobiography praised Ferguson as 'the most liberal supporter I had'.

Ferguson held his seat at the 1969 general election. In August, he resigned from the Orange Order, and was subsequently subject to intimidation. He stood down from Parliament in 1970 alongside O'Neill, citing ill health. In the subsequent by-election the Ulster Unionist candidate was beaten by the candidate from the Protestant Unionist Party. In April, his house in Lisburn was firebombed in an attack blamed on loyalists.

== Legal career ==
In 1971, Ferguson joined the Alliance Party of Northern Ireland, but did not continue in an active political role. Instead, he focused on law, becoming a Queen's Counsel (QC) in Northern Ireland in 1973 and chairing the Northern Ireland Mental Health Review Tribunal from 1973 until 1984. He departed Northern Ireland in 1983 and became a Senior Counsel in the Irish Republic, before moving to London in 1986 where he became a QC in England. From 1993 until 1995, he served as the Chair of the Criminal Bar Association.

He was defence counsel in many high-profile cases, such as those of mass-murderers Rosemary West and Patrick Magee, and successfully defended two British soldiers accused of war crimes in Iraq. By 2003, he was the top-earning criminal defence barrister, with more than £800,000 in that year.

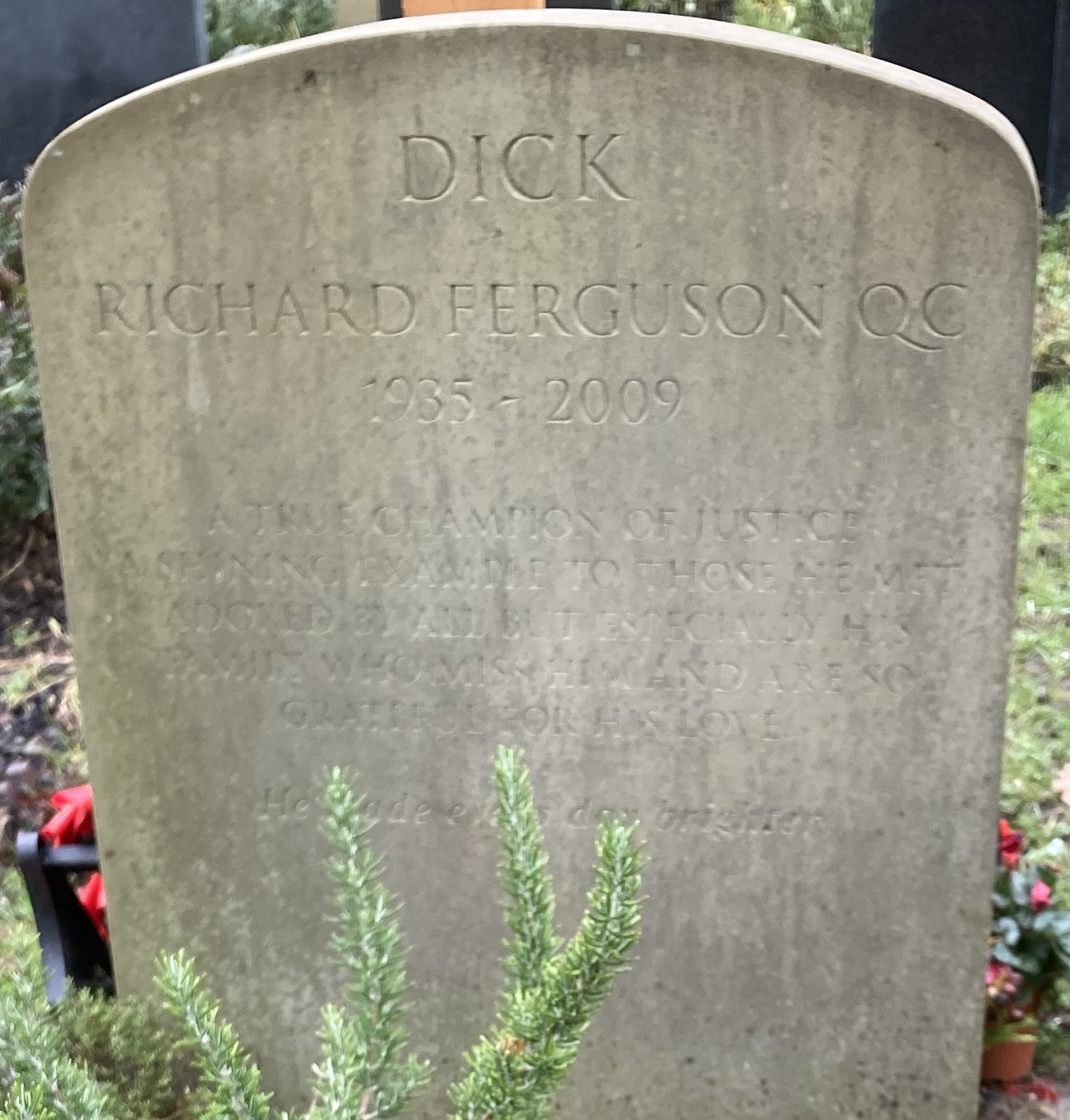
Grave of Richard Ferguson in Highgate Cemetery

In an obituary it was noted that he represented "property tycoon Nicholas Van Hoogstraten, Richard Branson of Virgin, Afghan airplane hijackers, the Birmingham Six, Guinness boss Ernest Saunders and boxer Terry Marsh....he regretted, he once said, not having the chance to defend Michael Jackson."

== Death notification ==
Ferguson died after heart surgery on 26 July 2009, aged 73, and was buried on the eastern side of Highgate Cemetery. He is survived by his second wife, Roma (née Whelan), a barrister, and their son; and by his first wife, Janet (née Magowan), and their four children.

Parliament of Northern Ireland
Preceded by Brian McConnell	Member of Parliament for South Antrim; 1968–1970	Succeeded by William Beattie
