= Ballymoney =

Town in County Antrim, Northern Ireland

Coordinates: 55.071°N 6.508°W

Ballymoney: Irish: Baile Monaidh; Scots: Bellymoney
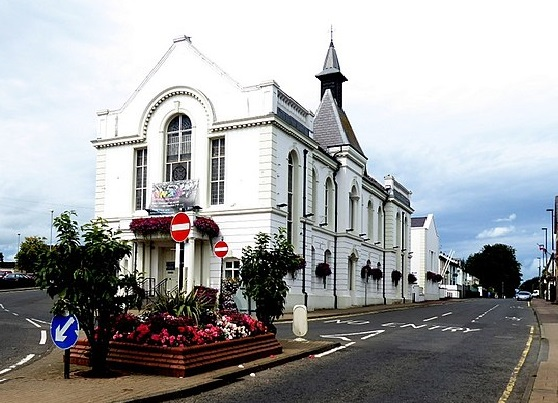
- Ballymoney Town Hall

- Coat of Arms

- Location within Northern Ireland
- Population: 11,048 (2021 census)
  - Belfast: 48 mi (77 km)
- District: Causeway Coast and Glens
- County: County Antrim
- Country: Northern Ireland
- Sovereign state: United Kingdom
- Post town: BALLYMONEY
- Postcode district: BT55
- Dialling code: 028
- Police: Northern Ireland
- Fire: Northern Ireland
- Ambulance: Northern Ireland
- UK Parliament: North Antrim
- NI Assembly: North Antrim

Ballymoney (Irish: Baile Monaidh [ˌbˠalʲə ˈmˠɔnˠə], meaning 'townland of the moor') is a market town and civil parish in County Antrim, Northern Ireland. It is within the Causeway Coast and Glens Borough Council area. The civil parish of Ballymoney is situated in the historic baronies of Dunluce Upper and Kilconway in County Antrim, as well as the barony of North East Liberties of Coleraine in County Londonderry. It had a population of 11,048 people at the 2021 census.

The town was established by Scottish settlers following the Tudor Conquest of Ulster at the beginning of the 17th. century. In the 18th. century, townspeople were drawn to the dissident Volunteer and United Irish movements. In the 19th. century, they supported tenant farmers in their agitation for tenant right and land ownership. On the question of Irish self-government and unity, the town, reflecting its Protestant majority, has been staunchly unionist.

The town hosts the Ballymoney Drama Festival, the oldest drama festival in Ireland, which was founded in 1933. The town also hosts the Ballymoney Show, one of the oldest agricultural shows in Northern Ireland, founded in 1902.

== History ==
=== 16th and 17th century ===
In 1556, an account of an English expedition against the MacDonnells, a branch of the Scottish Clan Donald that lorded over a wide expanse of north and east Antrim known as the Route and Glynns, records "a bishop's house, which was with a castle and a church joined together in one, called Ballymonyn". Destroyed in the Irish Rebellion of 1641, no vestige of the bishop's house or castle remains, but a tower of a church built in 1637 by Sir Randal MacDonnell survives and is the town's oldest structure.

In the wake of the devastation caused by the Nine Years War, Sir Randal had invited settlers from lowland Scotland. Unlike the MacDonnells and the native Irish, the majority of these were not Roman Catholics, but neither did they recognise the episcopacy of the reformed church established under the British Crown. Conscious of their disabilities both as "dissenters" from the established church and as tenants at will, after two/three generations, these Scottish Presbyterians began to leave in search of opportunity elsewhere.

=== 18th century ===
In summer 1718, several Presbyterian ministers from Ballymoney and the surrounding area led their congregants abroad ships in Coleraine and Londonderry bound for New England. This was among the early wave of departures that, in the course of the coming decades, was to carry tens of thousands of "Scots-Irish" across the Atlantic.

From 1778, inspired by the revolt of their relatives in the American colonies, the disaffection among the people of the town and district took a more radical turn, first in the drilling and political conventions of the Volunteer militia, and then from 1795 in the Society of United Irishmen. The "test" or pledge of the Society "to form a Brotherhood of affection amongst Irishmen of every religious persuasion" and secure an "equal representation of all the people in Ireland", was administered by leading residents of the town, among them a doctor, a schoolmaster and two attorneys. When in June 1798, having despaired of parliamentary reform, the Society called for insurrection, men assembled on Dungobery Hill, parading with guns, pikes, pitchforks, and scythes tied upon sticks. Although they quickly dispersed on news of the defeat of the larger rebel host at Antrim town, reprisals were taken. Government troops burned the town, and many of the rebels were either hanged or "sent for transportation" (to the West Indies or to the penal colony of New South Wales). The young licentiate minister, Richard Caldwell, who had had command of the rebels found exile in the United States, there to die in War of 1812 in a march on Canada.

=== 19th century ===
In 1837, Lewis's Topographical Dictionary of Ireland, describes Ballymoney as "a market-town and post-town" containing 2,222 inhabitants (11,579 in the broader civil parish) with a long established linen market chiefly supplying the London market, and with "a very extensive trade ... in grain, butter, pork, and general provisions". Transport was largely via the Bann. By 1860, the town was connected to both Belfast and Derry by rail.

At the height of the Great Famine in 1847, entire families were being admitted to the Ballymoney Workhouse. At one point, it became vastly overcrowded with 870 inmates. The destitute families were separated, men, women, and children being subject to demanding work regimes. By the end of the century, the number of people seeking relief had declined, and the workhouse closed in 1918. It later became the site of the Route Hospital.

In the decades following the famine, the issue of tenant right challenged large landowners who, as "loyalists" and "unionists", had believed they could count on popular support, and had contributed to the electoral successes of James MacKnight and Samuel MacCurdy Greer in neighboring County Londonderry. In 1869, the Rev. James Armour and others in Ballymoney formed the Route Tenants Defence Association. In 1874, the association organised a major North-South National Tenants' Rights conference in Belfast, which called for loans to facilitate tenant purchase of land and for breaking the landlord monopoly on local government.

=== 20th century ===
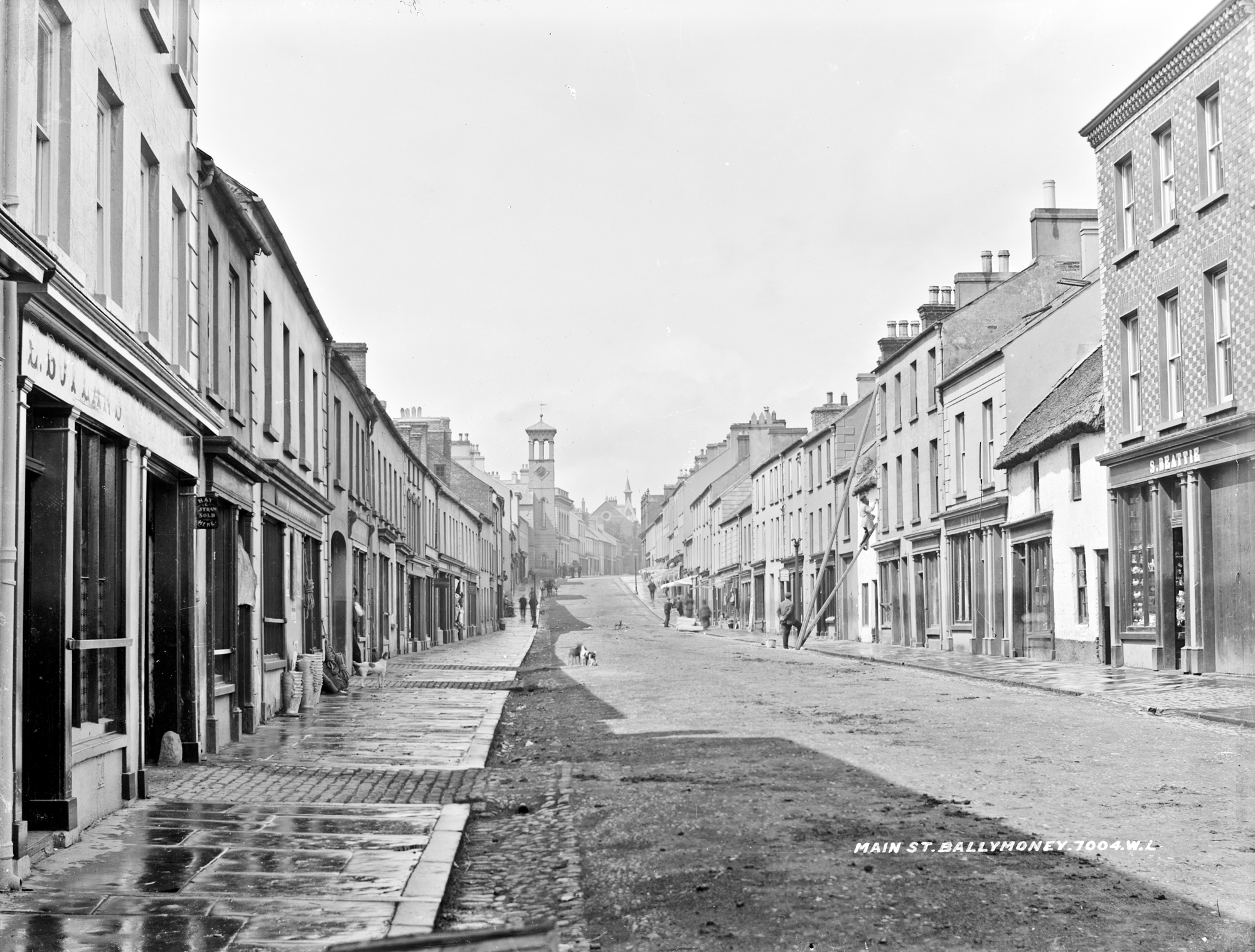
Main Street, Ballymoney, in the early 1900s

After the turn of the century there was local support for the Independent Orange Order, promoted by its first Imperial Grand Master, Lindsay Crawford (an admirer of the United Irishmen), as an expression of "progressive Protestantism". In 1906, the IOO supported the election of Liberal R. G. Glendinning due largely to his support for compulsory land purchase.

By the time of the 1912–14 Home Rule crisis, the land question had resolved largely in the tenants' favour, and official unionism reasserted itself. A meeting in Ballymoney Town Hall in October 1913 organised by Armour and Ballymena's Jack White, and with Sir Roger Casement and Alice Stopford Green on the platform, disputed the claim of Edward Carson's Unionists to speak for northern Protestants. Local historian Alex Blair notes, "the meeting put Ballymoney into the press headlines across the United Kingdom. All the big London papers had a representative in the Town Hall and ‘The London Times’ carried an editorial as well as a report". But while the dissident meeting had filled the hall, in November an anti-Home Rule meeting addressed by Carson's lieutenant Sir James Craig had the crowd spilling out of the hall into the surrounding streets.

Broadly in line with its three-quarters Protestant majority, Ballymoney remained a Unionist town. From 1921, its Antrim, and later Bannside, constituencies returned Ulster Unionists to the Northern Ireland Parliament virtually unopposed. This ended only in February 1969, when standing as a Protestant Unionist, the Rev. Ian Paisley came within a few percentage points of unseating the Prime Minister of Northern Ireland, Captain Terence O'Neill.

This was at the onset of the Northern Irish Troubles, in the course of which Ballymoney and its immediate surroundings witnessed 14 conflict-related deaths. Seven people were killed by various loyalist groups, four by the Irish Republican Army (IRA), and three by the British Army. The most notorious incident occurred at the height of the Drumcree protests, three months after the 1998 "Good Friday" Agreement under which both republican and loyalist paramilitaries had committed to permanent ceasefires. The Ulster Volunteer Force petrol bombed a house in a predominantly Protestant area of the town, killing three Catholic children, the Quinn brothers.

The last major flax-spinning operation in the area, the Balnamore Mill, made its final shipment of linen (to Germany) and closed its doors in 1959. The same year, saw the camera manufacturer K.G. Corfield moved from Wolverhampton to Ballymoney, becoming the only camera manufacturer on the island of Ireland. But this surprise addition to Ballymoney's shrinking industrial base failed in the face of Japanese and German competition. It ceased production in 1971. A further blow to the local economy was delivered in 1988 by a fire that destroyed the Lovell and Christmas pig processing factory that had employed more than 400 people and processed about 40% of Northern Ireland's pork.

=== 21st century ===
In the 21st century, Ballymoney recovered its ability to attract industrial investment. Examples included a 2015 €6.8 million expansion in the operations of McAuley Engineering, and the announcement in June 2022 of a £9 million expansion of the metal fabricator facility of the U.S. machinery giant Terex.

In the 30 years between the 1981 census and the 2011 census, the population of the town almost doubled from 5,679 to 10,393 people. In the broader-than-the-town census area, the population rose from 26,865 in 2001 to 32,505 in 2020.

In June 2025, there were three nights of rioting during which a number of immigrant homes were attacked. The principal target was the area's Roma community which according to local sources had grown in recent years to as many as 2,000. Of these, three-quarters are thought to have fled the town after the riots, with but with most quietly returning later in the year to neighbourhoods other than Clonavon where they had previously concentrated.

== Politics ==
Ballymoney district is part of the Causeway Coast and Glens Borough Council. In 2023, the residents elected 2 Democratic Unionist Party, 2 Sinn Féin, 1 Ulster Unionist Party, 1 Traditional Unionist Voice and 1 Alliance Party councillors. in 2022, Ballymoney's North Antrim Constituency returned to the Northern Ireland Assembly one Ulster Unionist, one Democratic Unionist, one Traditional Unionist Voice, one Sinn Féin and one Alliance member.

In the 2024 general election, Jim Allister, leader of the Traditional Unionist Voice, defeated Ian Paisley Jr for the Westminster seat with a majority of 460 votes. This marked the end of 54 years of the constituency being in the hands of the Paisley family.

== Demographics ==
=== 2021 census ===
On census day (21 March 2021), 11,048 people were living in the town of Ballymoney. Of these:

- 71.9% belong to or were brought up in a 'Protestant and Other Christian (including Christian-related)' faith, and 16% belong to or were brought up in the Catholic Christian faith.
- 68.9% indicated that they had a British national identity, 37.8% had a Northern Irish national identity and 7.3% had an Irish national identity (respondents could indicate more than one national identity).

=== 2011 census ===
At the time of the 2011 census, 27 March 2011, 10,402 people were living in the town of Ballymoney (in 4,354 households), an increase of 15.3% on the 2001 census population of 9,021. Of these:

- 19.75% were aged under 16 years, and 16.91% were aged 65 and over.
- 52.84% of the usually resident population were female and 47.16% were male.
- 76.23% belong to or were brought up in a 'Protestant and Other Christian (including Christian-related)' faith, and 17.17% belong to or were brought up in the Catholic Christian faith.
- 73.34% indicated that they had a British national identity, 28.11% had a Northern Irish national identity, and 6.78% had an Irish national identity (respondents could indicate more than one national identity).
- 39 years was the average (median) age of the population.
- 32.05% had some knowledge of Ulster-Scots, and 4.01% had some knowledge of Irish (Gaelic).

== Buildings of note ==
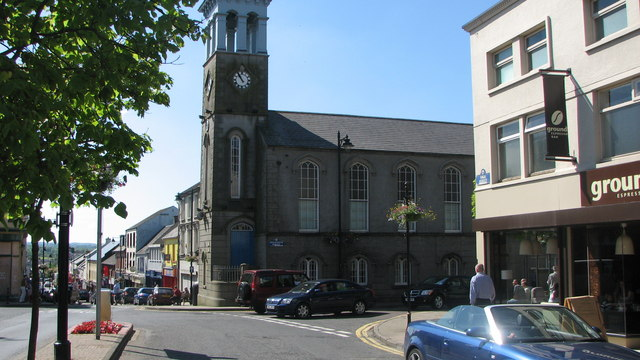
Ballymoney town clock and masonic hall

There are several historic buildings in Ballymoney's town centre. These include an old church tower, dating from 1637, which is the town's oldest surviving building.

The town clock and masonic hall was commissioned by Randal MacDonnell, 6th Earl of Antrim in 1775. The hall was used as a market house, courthouse, town hall, and school.

Ballymoney Town Hall was erected in 1866.

== Education ==
=== Primary schools ===
- Ballymoney Primary School, also known as Ballymoney Model, located on North Road is within the Northern Eastern Education Library Board area.
- Garryduff Primary School, for pupils aged 4–11, is located on the Garryduff road approximately 3 miles outside of Ballymoney. It has a new extension with a multi-purpose hall and a classroom.
- Landhead Primary School is a primary school for pupils aged 5 to 11 years on Kilraughts Road.
- Leaney Primary School is located near Ballymoney High School on Intermediate Road, approximately 1 mile from the town centre. The school, for children aged 4 to 11, is part of the Eco-Schools programme.
- Lislagan Primary School is about three miles from Ballymoney in a rural location. It is a controlled school for girls and boys aged from 3 to 11 and is within the North Eastern Education and Library Board area. As of 2006, enrollment stood at 94.
- St. Brigid's Primary School is located in Castle Street.

=== Secondary schools ===
- Ballymoney High School
- Dalriada School
- Our Lady of Lourdes High School, Ballymoney

== Sport ==
Association football clubs in the area include Ballymoney United F.C. and Glebe Rangers F.C.

== Transport ==
=== Rail ===
Ballymoney railway station originally opened on 4 December 1855, and was closed to goods traffic on 4 January 1965. It was one terminus of the Ballycastle Railway, a narrow gauge railway which ran 17 miles connecting Ballycastle to Ballymoney, on the Belfast and Northern Counties Railway (BNCR), later Northern Counties Committee (NCC), main line to Derry, and closed in July 1950.

The refurbished railway station was opened in May 1990.

=== Road ===
The A26 road, which connects Coleraine to Banbridge, skirts round the north and east of the town. However, there are various junctions for roads from the town.

A main thoroughfare in town is Charles Street/Church Street/Queen Street/Ballymena Road.

=== Bus ===
There are several buses most days on Ulsterbus route 178 which runs between Coleraine and Ballycastle. Within town, Ulsterbus Town Service operates routes 373a and 373b Mondays to Fridays as at 2026.

== Economy and media ==
Maine Soft Drinks Ltd is based in the area.

The Ballymoney Chronicle was established in 1844. It is the largest-selling weekly newspaper on the North Coast and the second-largest in Northern Ireland.

== People ==
=== Arts and media ===
- Patrick Boyle (1905–1982), novelist.
- George Shiels (1881–1949), popular playwright of the early 20th century.
- James Young (1918–1974), comedian.

=== Politics ===
- J. B. Armour (1841–1928), cleric, educationalist and Home Rule activist.
- Thomas McKean (1734–1817), a prominent figure in the American Revolution, was the son of an emigrant from Ballymoney.
- Sir William Moore (1864–1944), Unionist politician and judge.
- William Robinson (1823–1912), Conservative Ontario politician.
- John Pinkerton (1845–1908), Tenant righter and Irish Parliamentary Party MP.
- John Robb (1932–2018), surgeon and member of Seanad Éireann.
- John Tennant (1777–1813), born at Roseyards near Ballymoney, leading United Irishman, killed in the service of Napoleon's Irish Legion.

=== Sports ===
- Adrian Archibald (born 1969), motorcycle racer.
- Stephen Carson (born 1980), former Northern Ireland Under-21 international footballer, who plays for Coleraine in the IFA Premiership.
- Peter Chambers (born 1990), rower; silver medal in the men's lightweight four at the 2012 Summer Olympics.
- Karen Corr (born 1969), pool and snooker player.
- Stephen Dooley (born 1991), professional footballer.
- Michael Dunlop (born 1989), motorcycle racer, Robert Dunlop's son
- Joey Dunlop (1952–2000), known as the "King of the Road", won at the Isle of Man TT a record 26 times.
- Robert Dunlop (1960–2008), motorcycle racer, Joey Dunlop's brother
- William Dunlop (1985–2018), motorcycle racer, Robert Dunlop's son
- Mabel Harrison (1886–1972), golfer, died at Ballymoney
- James Hopkins (1901–1943), professional footballer.
- Gary Kelly (born 1989), Bowls World Cup Singles champion
- Gareth McAuley (born 1992), sport shooter
- Bridget McKeever (born 1983), a former Ireland women's field hockey international.
- Dino Morelli (born 1973), racing driver
- Jim Platt (born 1952), former Middlesbrough and Northern Ireland goalkeeper.
- Damien Quinn (born 1980), captain of the Antrim senior hurling team.
- Chris Turner (born 1987), former Northern Ireland Under-21 international footballer.
- Davy Tweed (1959–2021), rugby player, Unionist politician

== Town twinning ==
- Benbrook, Texas, United States
- Douglas, Isle of Man
- Taguig, Philippines
- Vannes, France

== See also ==
- List of localities in Northern Ireland by population
- List of civil parishes of County Antrim
- Market houses in Northern Ireland
