= 1913 East Antrim by-election =

UK Parliamentary by-election

The 1913 East Antrim by-election was held on 19 February 1913. The by-election was held due to the death of the incumbent Irish Unionist MP, James McCalmont. It was won by the Irish Unionist candidate Robert McCalmont, who was unopposed.

== Result ==
1913 East Antrim by-election
Party	Candidate	Votes	%	±%
Irish Unionist	Robert McCalmont	Unopposed		
Registered electors				
Irish Unionist hold				
