= George Hanna (MP for East Antrim) =

Northern Irish barrister, unionist politician and county court judge

George Hanna, KC
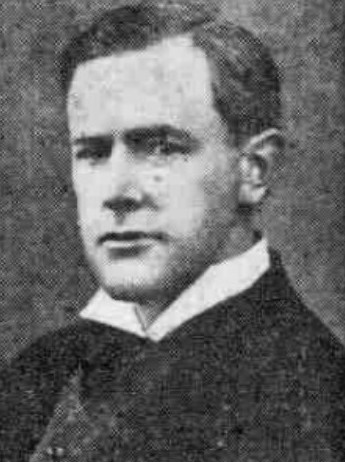
- Hanna, c. 1920s

Member of Parliament for East Antrim
- In office 19 May 1919 – 15 November 1922.
- Preceded by: Robert McCalmont

Personal details
- Born: 17 December 1877
- Died: 30 October 1938 (aged 60)

George Boyle Hanna, KC (17 December 1877 – 30 October 1938) was a Northern Irish barrister, unionist politician and county court judge.

He was born at Linen Hall Street in Ballymena, County Antrim, the son of auctioneer Robert Hanna and Mary Jane Kennedy. He was educated at Gracehill Academy, Ballymena Academy and Trinity College, Dublin and was first admitted as a solicitor in 1901, being called to the Bar in 1920, taking silk as a King's Counsel in 1933. He was a member of Antrim County Council from 1908 to 1921.

From 1919 until 1922, he was the independent Unionist Member of the UK Parliament for East Antrim, narrowly beating an official Unionist candidate in a by-election, but standing down at the 1922 general election.

From 1921 to 1937, he served as an official Unionist in the Parliament of Northern Ireland, first representing County Antrim (1921–29) and then Larne until his appointment as a county court judge for County Tyrone in 1937. He was Parliamentary Secretary to the Ministry of Home Affairs from 1925 to 1937. He only served as a judge for six months, dying soon after his appointment.

== Personal life ==
He was married in December 1903 to Susanna "Sunnie" Mack and had two children – George and Mary.

Parliament of the United Kingdom
Preceded by Robert McCalmont	Member of Parliament for East Antrim; 1919–1922	Constituency abolished
Parliament of Northern Ireland
New constituency	Member of Parliament for Antrim; 1921–1929	Constituency abolished
New constituency	Member of Parliament for Larne; 1929–1937	Succeeded by Harold Claude Robinson
Political offices
Preceded by Robert Megaw	Parliamentary Secretary to the Ministry of Home Affairs; 1925–1937	Succeeded by John Clarke Davison
