= James McCalmont =

British politician

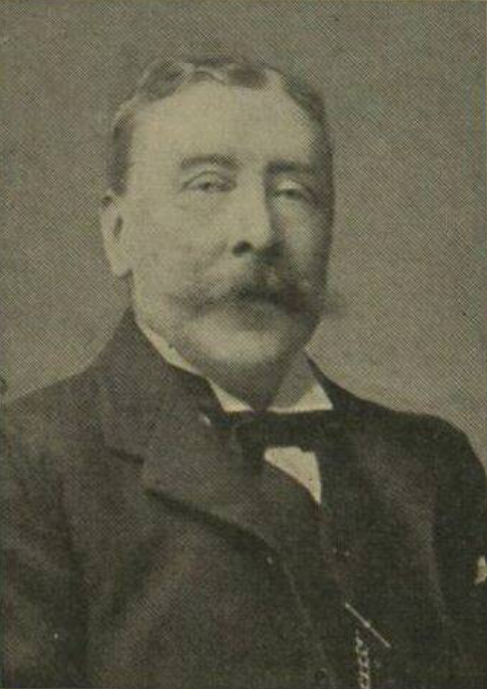

Member of Parliament for Antrim East
- In office 24 November 1885 – 2 February 1913
- Preceded by: Constituency created
- Succeeded by: Robert McCalmont

Personal details
- Born: 23 May 1847 Belfast, Ireland
- Died: 2 February 1913 (aged 65) Belfast, Ireland
- Party: Home Rule (1874) Conservative (1885–1892) Irish Unionist (1892–1913)
- Spouse: Mary Caroline Romer (m. 1880)
- Education: Eton College
- Military career
- Allegiance: United Kingdom
- Branch: British Army
- Service years: 1866–1874, 1876–1883
- Rank: Colonel

Colonel James Martin McCalmont (23 May 1847 – 2 February 1913) was a British Army officer and Conservative, later Irish Unionist, politician.

== Early life and education ==
McCalmont was born in Abbeylands, Belfast on 23 May 1847, the second and final son of James McCalmont (1819–1849), JP, DL for County Antrim, and his wife Emily Anne Martin (1827–1901). His older brother was Major-General Sir Hugh McCalmont, Member of Parliament for North Antrim from 1895 to 1899. Both he and his brother were educated at Eton College.

== Military career ==
After leaving Eton, McCalmont joined the 8th Hussars as a Cornet in 1866. He was promoted to Lieutenant in 1869, then Captain in 1871. He retired from the Hussars in 1874, in order to pursue a career in politics. Two years later, he resumed his career as a Lieutenant with the Denbighshire Hussars and was re-promoted to captain in 1877. During this time, he served as A.D.C. to The Duke of Marlborough, Viceroy of Ireland, and his successor Earl Cowper. McCalmont resigned his commission again in 1883. He was made an honorary Colonel to the Antrim Artillery in the 1890s.

== Political career ==
Having left the military, McCalmont was eligible to stand in the 1874 general election, and he was nominated as one of three candidates for the Home Rule League in County Longford. The election was won by Myles O'Reilly and George Errington, with McCalmont receiving only 26 votes. Following this defeat he returned to the military for a further seven years, before again retiring to stand for the newly created Antrim East constituency as a Conservative candidate in 1885. He was elected, and was subsequently re-elected for a further seven elections, holding the seat until his death. From 1892 he was a member of the Irish Unionist party. During his time in parliament, McCalmont was heavily involved in Irish and military affairs, particularly with regards to the increasingly dominant subject of Irish home rule. He was involved in the defeat of the Irish Home Rule Bill in 1886 and 1893.

== Personal life and death ==
McCalmont was married to Mary Caroline Romer (1859–1922) in Dolgelly, Wales, on 14 October 1880. The couple had two children, Robert and Margaret. Outside of politics, McCalmont was a keen pianist and sportsman. He frequently entered the Waterloo Cup, and was heavily involved in the development of the Royal Portrush Golf Club.

McCalmont made his final public appearance in September 1912 at a demonstration regarding the Home Rule Crisis. He died in February 1913, aged 65, following a short illness. His death resulted in a by-election in Antrim East, and his son, Robert McCalmont succeeded him as MP until 1919.

Parliament of the United Kingdom
New constituency see Antrim	Member of Parliament for Antrim East; 1885–1913	Succeeded by Robert McCalmont
