= Stephen Carson =

Northern Irish footballer (born 1980)

Personal information
- Full name: Stephen Carson
- Date of birth: 6 October 1980 (age 46)
- Place of birth: Ballymoney, Northern Ireland
- Position: Winger

Senior career*
Years	Team	Apps	(Gls)
1999–2001	Rangers	2	(0)
2001–2003	Dundee United	20	(0)
2003–2004	Barnsley	11	(1)
2004	Hartlepool United	3	(0)
2004–2011	Coleraine	280	(62)
2011–2013	Glentoran	51	(7)
2013–2014	Coleraine	20	(3)

International career
2000–2001	Northern Ireland U21	2	(0)
2009	Northern Ireland	1	(0)
- * Club domestic league appearances and goals

Stephen Carson (born 6 October 1980) is a Northern Irish former professional footballer who played as a winger. He is now director of coaching at FC Westchester.

== Career ==
Carson started his senior career in the Scottish Premier League with Rangers. After only a handful of first team appearances, he moved to Dundee United in August 2001 for a transfer fee of £150,000, but he struggled to command a regular place in the team. After leaving United in 2003, Carson had brief spells with Barnsley and Hartlepool United prior to his return to Northern Ireland to join the club he supported as a boy, Coleraine. Stephen Carson is also Youth development officer at Coleraine.

In May 2008, he received his first call-up to the Northern Ireland squad for the friendly against Italy on 6 June. He won his first international cap with a start in against the Azzurri in Pisa.

In July 2009 it was reported on the BBC Sport website that Carson was in talks with A-League side Newcastle United Jets FC about a possible transfer. Carson went on a trial in Australia but the transfer did not take place.

Carson revealed on 11 April 2011, that he would be leaving Coleraine to join Glentoran at the end of the 2010–2011 season. He would later go on to win the Irish League Cup with the side in 2012 and the Irish Cup a year later. After two seasons in total, however, Carson returned to his boyhood favourites, Coleraine FC, where he resumed the position of winger. He retired in January 2014 to take up a coaching role in New York with Everton FC Westchester.

== Career statistics ==
Appearances and goals by club, season and competition
Club	Season	League		National cup		League cup		Other		Total	
Club	Season	Apps	Goals	Apps	Goals	Apps	Goals	Apps	Goals	Apps	Goals
Rangers	1999–00	0	0	0	0	1	0	0	0	1	0
Rangers	2000–01	2	0	1	0	0	0	0	0	3	0
Rangers	Total	2	0	1	0	1	0	0	0	4	0
Dundee United	2001–02	13	0	4	0	1	0	0	0	18	0
Dundee United	2002–03	7	0	0	0	0	0	0	0	7	0
Dundee United	Total	20	0	4	0	1	0	0	0	25	0
Barnsley	2003–04	11	1	4	0	0	0	2	0	17	1
Hartlepool	2003–04	3	0	0	0	0	0	0	0	3	0
Career total		36	1	9	0	2	0	2	0	49	1
