= Helen Megaw =

Irish X-ray crystallographer

- Megaw circa 1950
- Born: 1 June 1907; Dublin
- Died: 26 February 2002 (aged 94); Ballycastle, County Antrim
- Education: Queen's University, Belfast, Girton College, Cambridge
- Known for: Crystallographer who determined the structure of ice crystals and the Perovskite crystal structure.
- Father: Robert Megaw
- Awards: The Roebling Medal of the Mineralogical Society of America. Megaw Island and the mineral Megawite (CaSnO_{3}) are named after her.
- Scientific career
- Fields: Crystallography
- Doctoral advisor: J. D. Bernal
- Doctoral students: Robert E. Newnham; Sivaramakrishna Chandrasekhar

Helen Dick Megaw (1 June 1907 – 26 February 2002) was an Irish crystallographer who was a pioneer in X-ray crystallography. She made measurements of the cell dimensions of ice and established the Perovskite crystal structure.

== Education and career ==
Megaw was born in Dublin to mathematics teacher Annie McElderry (1874-1968) and judge Robert Megaw, two graduates of Queen's University Belfast who were both originally from Ballymoney, Antrim. She was educated at first at Alexandra College in Dublin, and then briefly at Methodist College in Belfast after the family (including younger brother John, later a leading judge) moved back there in 1921, and finally at the Roedean School in England. While still at school, Megaw read Bragg's X-rays and Crystal Structure. She spent a year at Queen's University, Belfast before moving to Girton College, Cambridge to study Natural Sciences in 1926. She graduated in 1930 and was a research student in crystallography under J. D. Bernal. Megaw's first speciality was the structure of ice, and she was awarded her PhD in 1934, and Girton awarded her a Hertha Ayrton research scholarship which she used to study in Vienna in 1934-1935 under Hermann Francis Mark. In 1935 Megaw co-published with Bernal an influential method for fixing the position of hydrogen atoms known as the Bernal-Megaw model. She spent the year 1935–1936 in Oxford with Francis Simon and then spent several years as a schoolteacher before becoming an industrial crystallographer with Philips Lamps in London in 1943. It was through work at Philips on barium titanate that Megaw first worked on the perovskite crystal structure, on which she established herself as an acknowledged expert. In 1945 Megaw returned to working with Bernal, now at Birkbeck College in London, for a year before taking a post at the Cavendish Laboratory in Cambridge. She became a Fellow and Director of Studies at Girton. Megaw retired in 1972 and divided her time between Cambridge and Ballycastle, County Antrim, where she died in 2002.

Her first book, Ferroelectricity in Crystals, was published in 1957. It was followed by a second book, Crystal Structures: a Working Approach, in 1973.

Following a conversation with Mark Hartland Thomas in 1949 (chief industrial officer of the Council of Industrial Design), Megaw was appointed scientific consultant for the Festival Pattern Group of the Festival of Britain, 1951. She became the prime scientific mover in the group which put crystallographic images in the hands of industrial designers for them to use in products which were displayed at the Festival and in some cases beyond. In 2019, some of Megaw's fabric samples were displayed at the Science Museum, London as part of an exhibition "The Art of Innovation" which explored the relationship between art and science.

== Legacy and honors ==
In recognition of her work in determining the structures of ice crystals, Megaw Island in the Southern Ocean is named for her. Megawite (CaSnO_{3}), a perovskite-group mineral, is also named after her.

In 1976, Megaw gave a collection of fabric samples from the Festival of Britain along with a souvenir guide-book to the Science Museum in London.

In 1989, Megaw became the first woman to receive the Roebling Medal of the Mineralogical Society of America. She had honorary doctorates from the Universities of Cambridge and Queen's University Belfast.

== Bibliography ==
- Megaw, Helen D (1957). Ferroelectricity in crystals. London: Methuen. OCLC 2226235.
- Megaw, Helen D. (1965). Crystallographic Book List. Boston, MA. ISBN 978-1-4613-4620-3. OCLC 913812505.
- Megaw, Helen D. (1973). Crystal structures: a working approach. Philadelphia: Saunders. ISBN 0-7216-6260-9. OCLC 707007.
- Historical atlas of crystallography. J. Lima-de-Faria, Martin J. Buerger, Jenny P. Glusker, Helen D. Megaw, Paul B. Moore, Marjorie Senechal, William A. Wooster. Dordrecht: Published for International Union of Crystallography by Kluwer Academic Publishers. 1990. ISBN 0-7923-0649-X. OCLC 20933210.
