= Robert McCalmont =

British politician and Army officer

Brigadier-General Sir Robert McCalmont KCVO CBE DSO DL
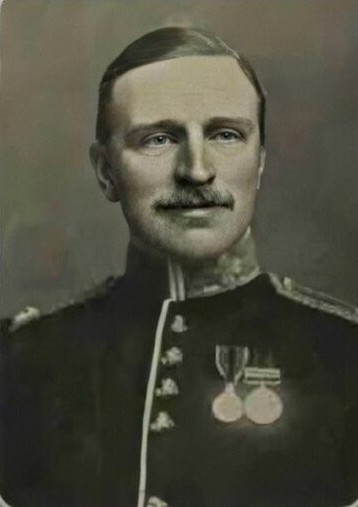

Member of Parliament for East Antrim
- In office 1913–1919
- Preceded by: James McCalmont
- Succeeded by: George Hanna

Personal details
- Born: Robert Chaine Alexander McCalmont; 29 August 1881 Merrion Square East, Dublin, Ireland
- Died: 4 November 1953 (aged 72) Dublin, Ireland
- Party: Irish Unionist
- Parent: James McCalmont (father)
- Education: Eton College

Military service
- Allegiance: United Kingdom
- Branch/service: British Army
- Rank: Brigadier-General
- Unit: Royal Warwickshire Regiment; Irish Guards
- Battles/wars: Second Boer War; First World War

Brigadier-General Sir Robert Chaine Alexander McCalmont KCVO CBE DSO DL (29 August 1881 – 4 November 1953) was a Northern Irish unionist politician and British Army officer.

Macalmont was born in Merrion Square East in Dublin, the son of Colonel and MP James McCalmont, and Mary Caroline Roman. He was educated at Eton College.

In 1900, he joined the Royal Warwickshire Regiment and served in the Second Boer War.

After the death of his father, Robert Macalmont took his father's seat as an Irish Unionist MP in the House of Commons for East Antrim at the 1913 by-election.

He served with the Irish Guards in the First World War, and reached the rank of Brigadier-General. He was appointed a Companion of the Distinguished Service Order in the 1917 New Year Honours and a Commander of the Royal Victorian Order in the 1937 Coronation Honours. He was appointed Honorary Colonel of 48th (South Midland) Divisional Signals, Royal Corps of Signals, on 16 July 1937. He was appointed a Knight Commander of the Royal Victorian Order in 1952.

He died in a Dublin nursing home in 1953, aged 72.

Parliament of the United Kingdom
Preceded by James McCalmont	Member of Parliament for East Antrim; 1913 – 1919	Succeeded by George Hanna
