= Megaw Island =

Island in Graham Land, Antarctica

Megaw Island (66°55′S 67°36′W) is the easternmost of the Bennett Islands in Hanusse Bay, Antarctica. It was mapped from air photos taken by the Ronne Antarctic Research Expedition (1947–48) and the Falkland Islands and Dependencies Aerial Survey Expedition (1956–57). The island was named by the UK Antarctic Place-Names Committee for Irish physicist Helen Megaw, who in 1934 made accurate measurements of the cell dimensions of ice.

== See also ==
- List of Antarctic and sub-Antarctic islands
