= Antrim (Northern Ireland Parliament constituency) =

Coordinates: 54.951°N 6.208°W

- Former County constituency for the Parliament of Northern Ireland
- Antrim shown within Northern Ireland

Former constituency
- Created: 1921
- Abolished: 1929
- Election method: Single transferable vote

Antrim was a county constituency of the Parliament of Northern Ireland from 1921 to 1929. It returned seven MPs, using proportional representation by means of the single transferable vote.

== Boundaries ==
Antrim was created by the Government of Ireland Act 1920 and consisted of the administrative County Antrim (that is, excluding those parts of the historic county within the County Borough of Belfast). The House of Commons (Method of Voting and Redistribution of Seats) Act (Northern Ireland) 1929 divided the constituency into seven constituencies elected under first past the post: Antrim Borough, Bann Side, Carrick, Larne, Mid Antrim, North Antrim and South Antrim.

== Second Dáil ==
In May 1921, Dáil Éireann, the parliament of the self-declared Irish Republic run by Sinn Féin, passed a resolution declaring that elections to the House of Commons of Northern Ireland and the House of Commons of Southern Ireland would be used as the election for the Second Dáil. All those elected were on the roll of the Second Dáil, but as no Sinn Féin MP was elected for Antrim, it was not represented there.

== Politics ==
Antrim had a Unionist majority, with some pockets of Nationalist support. In 1921, six Unionists and one Nationalist were elected, while in 1925, there were five unionists, one Nationalist and one member of the Unbought Tenants Association elected.

== Members of Parliament ==
Election	MP (Party)	MP (Party)	MP (Party)	MP (Party)	MP (Party)	MP (Party)	MP (Party)
1921	John Milne Barbour (UUP)	Hugh O'Neill (UUP)	George Hanna (UUP)	Robert Crawford (UUP)	Robert Dick Megaw (UUP)	John Fawcett Gordon (UUP)	Joseph Devlin (Nationalist)
1925	John Milne Barbour (UUP)	Hugh O'Neill (UUP)	George Hanna (UUP)	Robert Crawford (UUP)	Robert Dick Megaw (UUP)	George Henderson (Unbought Tenants)	Thomas Stanislaus McAllister (Nationalist)

== Election results ==
24 May 1921 General Election: Antrim (7 seats)
Party	Candidate	FPv%	Count				
Party	Candidate	FPv%	1	2	3	4	5
UUP	John Milne Barbour	22.18	17,735				
UUP	Hugh O'Neill	20.86	16,681				
UUP	George Hanna	15.74	12,584				
Nationalist	Joseph Devlin	11.82	9,448	9,469	9,499	9,528	9,560
UUP	Robert Dick Megaw	10.41	8,326	8,991	11,979		
UUP	Robert Crawford	7.47	5,976	11,958			
Sinn Féin	Louis Joseph Walsh	6.19	4,951	4,958	4,973	4,988	5,028
UUP	John Fawcett Gordon	3.71	2,967	3,890	7,507	10,029	
Sinn Féin	Joseph Connolly	1.60	1,281	1,424	1,461	1,485	1,511
Electorate: 93,566 Valid: 79,949 Quota: 9,994 Turnout: 85.5%

3 April 1925 General Election: Antrim (7 seats)
Party	Candidate	FPv%	Count				
Party	Candidate	FPv%	1	2	3	4	5
UUP	John Milne Barbour	20.99	13,499				
UUP	Hugh O'Neill	19.56	12,579				
Nationalist	Thomas Stanislaus McAllister	18.44	11,857				
UUP	Robert Crawford	11.37	7,310	11,369			
UUP	George Hanna	10.14	6,524	7,216	8,720		
Unbought Tenants	George Henderson	7.57	4,866	4,908	4,994	8,712	
UUP	Robert Dick Megaw	6.78	4,362	4,643	6,217	6,271	6,469
UUP	John Fawcett Gordon	5.16	3,318	3,703	5,078	5,123	8,254
Electorate: 98,278 Valid: 64,315 Quota: 8,040 Turnout: 65.4%
