= Milne Barbour =

Northern Irish politician

The Right Honourable Sir Milne Barbour Bt JP DL
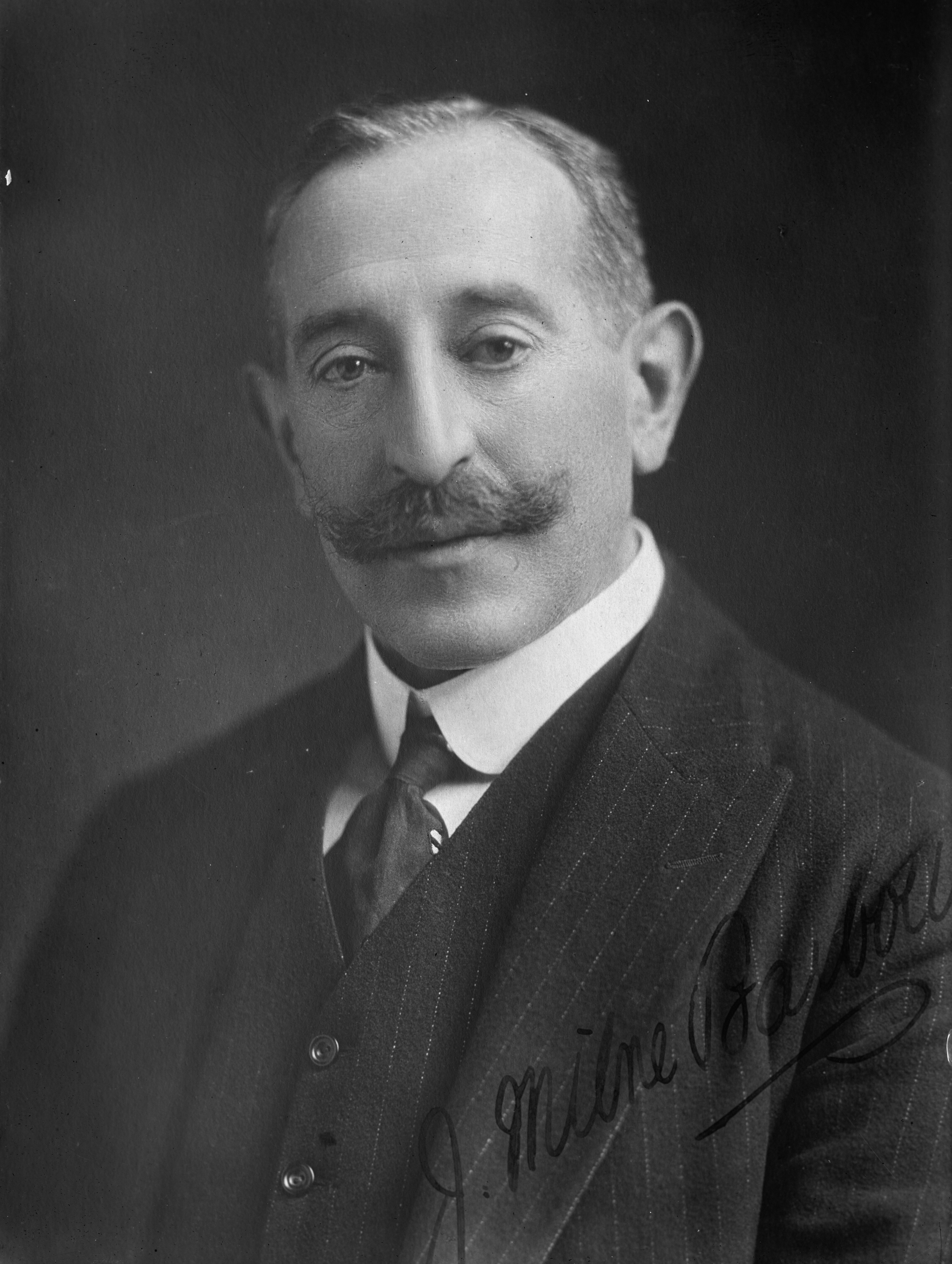

Minister of Commerce of Northern Ireland
- In office 16 April 1925 – 16 January 1941.

Minister of Finance for Northern Ireland
- In office 16 January 1941 – 6 May 1943.
- Constituency: Antrim (1921–1929)
- Constituency: South Antrim (1929–1951)

Personal details
- Born: John Milne Barbour; 4 January 1868 Lisburn, Ireland
- Died: 3 October 1951 (aged 83)
- Party: Ulster Unionist Party
- Spouse: Elise Barbour
- Children: 4
- Occupation: Linen manufacturer

Sir John Milne Barbour, 1st Baronet PC (NI) JP, DL, usually known as Sir Milne Barbour (4 January 1868 – 3 October 1951) was a Northern Irish politician and baronet.

== Background and education ==
Milne Barbour was the son of John Doherty Barbour, a mill owner, and Elizabeth Law Milne. He was born at The Fort in Lisburn, County Antrim, and was educated at Elstree School, Harrow School, Brasenose College, Oxford, and Darmstadt, Germany. The members of his family were wealthy linen manufacturers, owners of William Barbour Linen Thread Company of Hilden – the largest linen thread manufacturers in the world. In business he was chairman of the family company, which exists today in the same factory as Barbour Campbell Threads.

== Career ==
In politics, he served as a member of parliament for County Antrim from 1921 to 1929 and then for South Antrim from 1929 until his death in 1951. In 1921, he was appointed Parliamentary and Financial Secretary to the Ministry of Finance, and then entered Craigavon's Cabinet as Minister of Commerce in 1937 (where he was perceived as "wrong, inept and palsied") and was promoted, aged 72, to Minister of Finance. As a member of the Privy Council of Northern Ireland he was entitled to be the style The Right Honourable.

He also acted as High Sheriff of Armagh in 1905 and as High Sheriff of Down in 1907. He was created a baronet, of Hilden, in the County of Antrim, on 17 August 1943. He also served as President of the Belfast Chamber of Commerce in 1911, as a member of Belfast Harbour Commissioners from 1914 to 1950, as President of the Royal Victoria Hospital, Belfast and as president of the Royal Ulster Agricultural Society from 1925 to 1930 and from 1931 until his death. He also sat on the Senate of Queen's University, Belfast.

== Personal life ==
Barbour married Elise Barbour, a distant relative (b. Paterson, New Jersey, USA in 1873); Lady Barbour died at their home, Conway House, Dunmurry, in 1910. The couple had three daughters and one son.

The son, John Milne Jnr., was a civilian pilot (a former competitor in the King's Cup Race) who would fly home at the weekends from the Barbour factory in Glasgow, where he worked during the week. He died in July 1937 in an air-crash near Johnstone, Scotland, along with the three others on the aircraft.

Barbour's sister, Helen, married Thomas Andrews, architect of the Titanic. Barbour was a Freemason. He was described by diarist Lillian Dean, later Lady Spender (wife of Sir Wilfrid Spender) as "a curious man who looks like a stage Mephistopheles but is given to preaching in dissenting chapels". A deeply religious man throughout his life, he served as a Member of the General Synod of the Church of Ireland and presented the East Window to Christ Church Cathedral, Lisburn, in memory of his wife and son.

The baronetcy became extinct upon his death, Barbour having been predeceased by his son.

Barbour Memorial Playing Fields and the Sir Milne Barbour Memorial Garden, both in Lisburn, are named in his honour. A prize cup at the boat club of Queen's University, Belfast is also named in his honour.

== Arms ==
Coat of arms of Milne Barbour
Notes Granted by Sir Arthur Vicars, Ulster King of Arms, 31 October 1905. Crest On a wreath of the colours a hand couped between two flax branches Proper holding a cross pattée fitchée Azure. Escutcheon Argent a cross pattée between two flaunches Azure on a chief of the last three empty quills upright of the first. Motto Nihilo Nisi Cruce

== See also ==
- Summary of a piece of film held in the Public Records Office NI Digital Film Archive which features Sir Milne
- A motor car made for Sir Milne (in Spanish)

Parliament of Northern Ireland
New constituency	Member of Parliament for South Antrim; 1929–1951	Succeeded by Brian McConnell
Political offices
New office	Parliamentary and Financial Secretary, Ministry of Finance; 1921–1937	Succeeded by Alexander Gordon
Preceded by Edward Archdale	Minister of Commerce; 1925–1941	Succeeded by Sir Basil Brooke
Preceded by J. M. Andrews	Minister of Finance; 1941–1943	Succeeded by John Maynard Sinclair
Baronetage of the United Kingdom
New creation	Baronet (of Hilden); 1943–1951	Extinct
