= John Fawcett Gordon =

Northern Irish politician

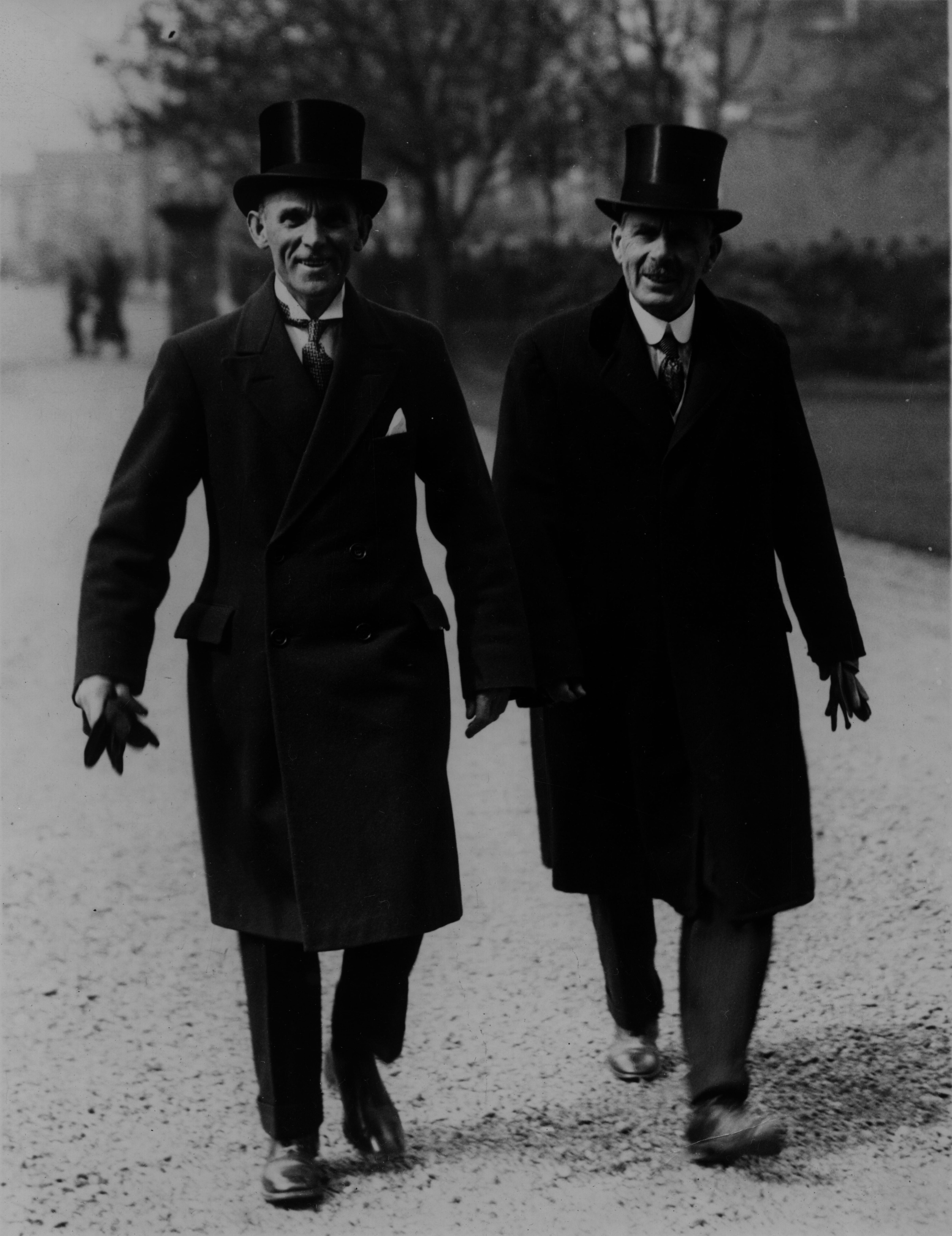
John F. Gordon MP (left) and Northern Irish Prime Minister John Andrews, 1940s at Stormont.

John Fawcett Gordon PC(NI) (13 May 1879 – 21 June 1965) was a politician in Northern Ireland.

Son of William James Gordon and Margaret Fawcett. Husband of Charlotte Banks. Born in the Belfast area, Gordon was sent to live with relatives in the US after his father died and was educated at Falls River School, Massachusetts, United States. He was manager of flax camps and a member of Belfast Corporation from 1920 to 1923. He was the Ulster Unionist Party Member of Parliament (MP) in the Northern Ireland parliament for Antrim and then Carrick from 1921 to 1943.

He served as Minister of Labour (Northern Ireland) from 1938 to 1943. Prior to that, he was Parliamentary Secretary to the Minister of Labour from 1921. He served as Chairman of the National Assistance Board of Northern Ireland from 1943 to 1956 when he retired, although he was serving as Governor's Deputy as late as 1964

He is the great-grandfather of Jonathan McDowell (Personal communication John F Gordon to Jonathan McDowell, March 1964).

== Sources ==
- http://www.election.demon.co.uk/stormont/biographies.html
- http://planet4589.org/jcm/pics/family/index.html
- Jonathan McDowell's family archives

Parliament of Northern Ireland
New parliament	Member of Parliament for Antrim; 1921–1929	Constituency abolished
New constituency	Member of Parliament for Carrick; 1929–1943	Succeeded by John Dermot Campbell
Political offices
New office	Parliamentary Secretary to the Ministry of Labour; 1921–1938	Succeeded by William Grant
Preceded by David Graham Shillington	Minister of Labour; 1938–1943	Succeeded by William Grant
