= Robert Crawford (Antrim politician) =

Robert Crawford (1874 – 28 July 1946) was an Ulster Unionist Party politician. He was Chairman of Antrim County Council for 23 years. At the 1921 Northern Ireland general election he was elected as a Member of Parliament (MP) for Antrim, and held that seat until it was abolished at the 1929 general election, when he was elected for the new Mid Antrim constituency. He retired from politics at the 1938 Northern Ireland general election.

Crawford was also the senior elder of the First Ballymena Presbyterian Church, and ran its Sunday school for more than fifty years.

Parliament of Northern Ireland
New constituency	MP for Mid Antrim; 1929–1938	Succeeded by John Patrick
