= Thomas Stanislaus McAllister =

Irish politician

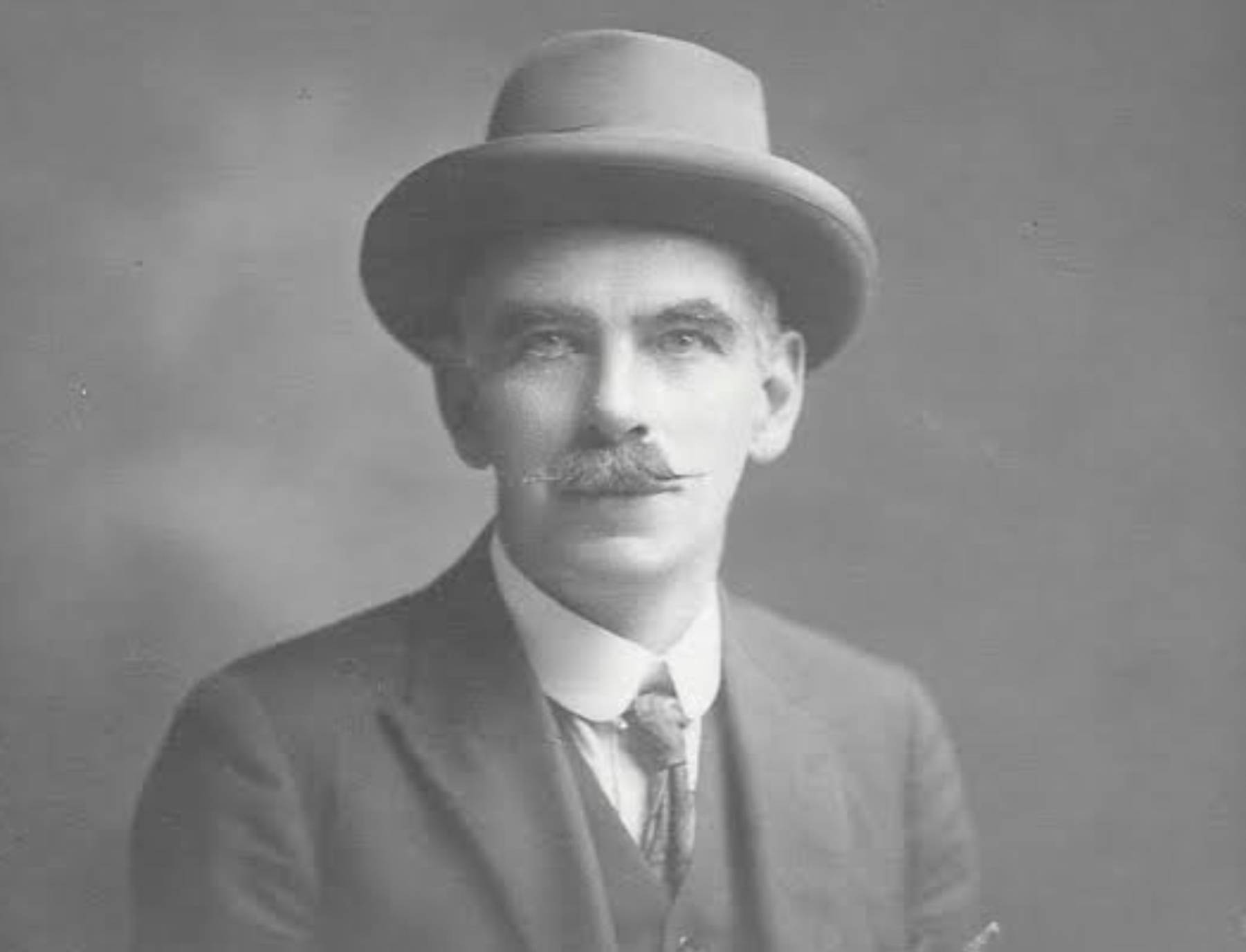
- Thomas Stanislaus McAllister
- Born: 1878
- Died: 29 April 1950 (aged 71–72)
- Occupations: Politician; solicitor

Thomas Stanislaus McAllister (1878 – 29 April 1950) was an Irish nationalist politician.

McAllister worked as a solicitor and became active in the United Irish League. At the 1925 Northern Ireland general election, he was elected for the Nationalist Party in Antrim. He took his seat almost immediately, alongside Joe Devlin, and the rest of the party gradually followed suit. He stood down at the 1929 general election, shortly after his election to the Senate of Northern Ireland. He became the party leader in the Senate and served until his death in 1950. He served as Deputy Speaker of the Senate 1930–32 and 1942–44.

McAllister was a native of Ballymena. He was noted as a huntsman, racing cyclist and also played football for Bohemians football club. He was the first president of St Malachy's College Old Boys' Association.

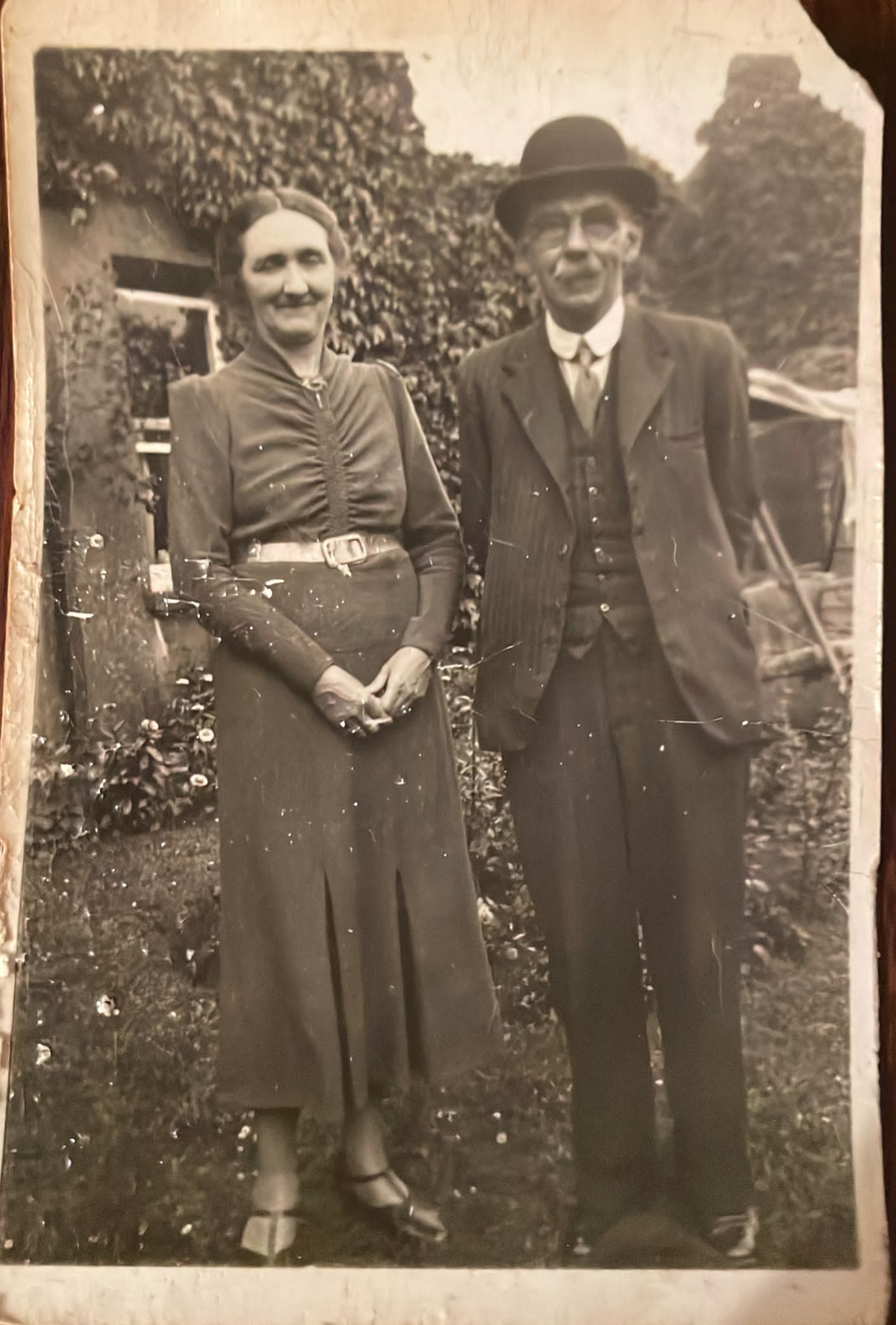
Sara and Thomas McAllister at home 1938
