= Protestant Unionist Party =

- Leader: Ian Paisley
- Founded: 1966; 60 years ago
- Dissolved: 1971; 55 years ago
- Preceded by: Ulster Protestant Action
- Succeeded by: Democratic Unionist Party
- Ideology: British unionism British nationalism Conservatism (British)
- Political position: Right-wing
- Religion: Fundamentalist Protestantism
- Colours: Red, White and Blue

The Protestant Unionist Party (PUP) was a unionist political party operating in Northern Ireland from 1966 to 1971. It was the forerunner of the Democratic Unionist Party (DUP) and emerged from the Ulster Protestant Action (UPA) movement. It was founded and led by Ian Paisley, who also founded and led the Free Presbyterian Church of Ulster.

The UPA had two councillors elected to Belfast Corporation. In 1967, both were re-elected as PUP candidates. The PUP stood six candidates against the ruling Ulster Unionist Party of the Northern Ireland parliament in the January 1969 general election. They polled over 20,000 votes, but gained no seats, although Paisley was seen as coming close in the previously safe Bannside seat of the Prime Minister of Northern Ireland Terence O'Neill.

When Terence O'Neill (the then Northern Irish Prime Minister) stood down from Stormont in 1970 along with one of his colleagues, the PUP nominated candidates for the two vacant seats. Both were successful. Ian Paisley and fellow Free Presbyterian minister, the Rev. William Beattie, PUP leader and deputy respectively, were elected - Paisley for Bannside and Beattie for South Antrim. In that year's Westminster general election, Paisley was elected to represent Antrim North in the British House of Commons.

The PUP campaigned for the retention of the Union and for total freedom for Orange parades. The PUP was wound up in 1971 and re-emerged as the DUP in October of that year.

The electoral label Protestant Unionist was subsequently used in the 1980s by Belfast City Council member George Seawright after he left the DUP.
