= Reginald Hoare =

British diplomat and banker

Sir Reginald Hoare KCMG

British Envoy to Romania
- In office 1935–1941
- Preceded by: Michael Palairet
- Succeeded by: No representation due to World War II

British Envoy to Persia
- In office 1931–1934
- Preceded by: Sir Robert Clive
- Succeeded by: Sir Hughe Knatchbull-Hugessen

Personal details
- Born: Reginald Hervey Hoare; 19 July 1882 Minley Manor, Hampshire
- Died: 12 August 1954 (aged 72) London, England
- Spouse: Lucy Joan Cavendish-Bentinck (m. 1922)
- Relations: Lord Arthur Hervey (grandfather)
- Parent(s): Charles Hoare; Katharine Patience Georgiana Hervey
- Education: Eton College
- Occupation: Diplomat, banker

Sir Reginald Hervey Hoare KCMG (19 July 1882 – 12 August 1954) was a British diplomat and banker.

== Early life ==
Hoare was born on 19 July 1882 at Minley Manor in Hampshire. Rex, as he was known, was the fourth son, in a family of four sons and three daughters, of Katharine Patience Georgiana Hervey and Charles Hoare (1844–1898), senior partner of C. Hoare & Co. His maternal grandparents were the former Patience Singleton and Lord Arthur Hervey, the Bishop of Bath and Wells from 1869 to 1894 (who was the fourth son of Frederick Hervey, 1st Marquess of Bristol).

Through his father, he was a descendant of King Henry VII.

Hoare was educated at Eton College.

== Career ==
After joining the diplomatic service in 1905, he served as diplomat to Bucharest, Constantinople (now known as Istanbul in Turkey), Rome, Cairo, Peking (today known as Beijing), and Petrograd (today known as Saint Petersburg). While in Russia, he replaced Francis Oswald Lindley and served under British consul, Douglas Young.

In 1931, he became Envoy Extraordinary and Minister plenipotentiary to Persia in Tehran, serving until 1934. In 1934, he was appointed Envoy Extraordinary and Minister plenipotentiary to Romania and began serving in 1935. Following King Carol's abdication in 1940, Hoare was withdrawn from Romania in 1941; he retired in 1942. Upon his exit from Rumania, the Italian newspaper Il Giornale d'Italia wrote:

"Hoare [Sir Reginald Hoare, British Minister to Rumania] goes without leaving any regret. On the contrary, if anything follows his flight it will be the maledictions of the widows and orphans of Rumanian workers whose lives were barbarously and uselessly sacrificed in the numerous and disastrous attempts at acts of sabotage carried out in the oil fields by British agents working under the personal direction of Hoare."

After his retirement from the government, he joined C. Hoare & Co., the family bank as a partner in 1944.

== Personal life ==
In 1922, he married Lucy Joan Cavendish-Bentinck (1889–1971), the elder daughter of William George Frederick Cavendish-Bentinck and Ruth Cavendish Bentinck. Lucy's grandfathers were Ferdinand Seymour, Earl St. Maur (son of Edward Seymour, 12th Duke of Somerset) and the Rt. Hon. George Cavendish-Bentinck (grandson of William Cavendish-Bentinck, 3rd Duke of Portland). Lucy's brothers, Ferdinand and Victor, were the 8th and 9th Duke of Portland, respectively. Together, Reginald and Lucy were the parents of one child:

- Joseph Andrew Christopher Hoare (1925–2002), the former chairman of Association of Chartered & Technical Analysts. He married Lady Christina Alice McDonnell, a daughter of Randal McDonnell, 8th Earl of Antrim and the artist Angela Sykes of Glenarm Castle. Among her brothers was Alexander McDonnell, 9th Earl of Antrim and artist Hector McDonnell.

He lived at Pine Crest in Hawley and at 80 Harley House on Marylebone Road in London. Sir Reginald died in London on 12 August 1954.

Hoare was appointed a Companion of the Order of St Michael and St George (CMG) in the 1926 Birthday Honours while he was Counsellor of Embassy in Constantinople.

Diplomatic posts
Preceded by Sir Robert Clive	Envoy Extraordinary and Minister Plenipotentiary to Persia; 1931–1934	Succeeded by Sir Hughe Knatchbull-Hugessen
