= Flora McDonnell =

Anglo-Irish artist and author

Flora Mary McDonnell (born 7 November 1963) is an Anglo-Irish artist, illustrator and author.

She won the Mother Goose Award for 1995.

== Early life ==
Born in Ireland, McDonnell is the eldest daughter of Alexander McDonnell, who was Keeper of Conservation at the Tate Gallery, a grand-daughter of the sculptor Angela Sykes, and a niece of another artist, Hector McDonnell. She is a descendant of William the Conqueror.

She was educated at St Mary's School, Shaftesbury, Gresham's School in Norfolk, and Exeter College, Oxford, which she left after two years in 1984. She then attended City and Guilds of London Art School from 1984 to 1989, graduating with a Diploma in Illustrative Arts.

== Career ==
In August 1989, McDonnell shared an art exhibition in Belfast with her uncle Hector McDonnell, when the News Letter commented "An Antrim artistic family if ever there was one." She had a solo exhibition at the Kerlin Gallery in Belfast in March 1991, with a theme of sheep farming. This was reported to have been "hugely successful". A solo exhibition in May 1992 with a fishing theme had the title "Trawling for Prawns from Ardglass". An exhibition in 1993 at One Oxford Street, Belfast, of fifty landscapes and portraits, was called "Familiar Faces 10am to 4pm and Favourite Places".

McDonnell went on to launch her children's book career with I Love Animals (1994), published by Walker Brothers. This was followed by I Love Boats (1995). Since then, she has published many children's books and collaborated with authors and poets, including illustrating two new editions of books of verse by Ted Hughes. Her illustrations for the Ted Hughes collection The Cat and the Cuckoo show Nethercott at Iddesleigh in North Devon, a Farm for City Children, near where Hughes lived.

In 2001, McDonnell had a joint exhibition at the Cavehill Gallery, Belfast, with Malcolm Bennett titled "At Times Charming and at Times Childlike". The Belfast Telegraph noted that they were "two very different artists with totally divergent work".

After a long intermission, McDonnell's Out of a Dark Winter's Night was published by Thames and Hudson in March 2020, when for the book launch the original oil pastels were exhibited at Abbott and Holder's gallery in Museum Street, Bloomsbury.

== Personal life ==
McDonnell married Dr Thomas Pennybacker in 2003, and they have one son, born in 2004. As the daughter of an Earl, she has the courtesy title of Lady Flora, but does not use it.

== Awards ==
- 1995: the Mother Goose Award for a first-time published children's book illustrator

== Publications ==
=== Children's books ===
- I Love Animals (Walker Books, 1994) ISBN 978-0-7445-4392-6
- I Love Boats (Walker Books, 1995) ISBN 978-0-7445-4373-5
- Flora McDonnell's ABC (Walker Books, 1998) ISBN 978-0-7445-6007-7
- Splash! (Candlewick Books, 1999) ISBN 0-7636-0481-X
- The Mermaid's Purse [poems by Ted Hughes, illustrated by Flora McDonnell] (Knopf Books, 2000) ISBN 978-0-375-90569-8
- The Cat and the Cuckoo [by Ted Hughes, illustrated by Flora McDonnell] (Roaring Brook Press, 2003) ISBN 978-0-7613-1548-3
- Sparky (Candlewick Books, 2004) ISBN 978-0-7636-2208-4
- Giddy up! Let's Ride! (New Line Books, 2006) ISBN 978-1-59764-214-9
- Out of a Dark Winter's Night (Thames and Hudson, 2020) ISBN 978-0-500-65195-7

=== Other ===
- Flora McDonnell, ed., Threads of Hope: Learning to Live with Depression (Short Books, 2003, ISBN 978-1-904095-35-4), with contributions by Margaret Drabble, Wendy Cope, Andrew Solomon, Virginia Ironside, Lewis Wolpert, Alastair Campbell, Montagu Don, and Kay Redfield Jamison.
