= Order of precedence in the Republic of Ireland =

Relative preeminence of officials for ceremonial purposes

Ireland has limited use of order of precedence.

== President ==
The Constitution of Ireland states that the President of Ireland "shall take precedence over all other persons in the State". This formula was used when the Constitution was enacted in 1937, instead of describing the President as head of state. The question of whether the head of state was the President or the British monarch was deliberately ambiguous until The Republic of Ireland Act 1948 came into force in 1949. In 1938–40 the "Court and Personal" column of The Irish Times, a Dublin newspaper of unionist background, was criticised by the Fianna Fáil government for listing the President's engagements after those of the British royal family and others, including leading members of the former Protestant Ascendancy — what Frank Aiken called "every hyphenated person in the country". The agreed solution was to place items about the President elsewhere in the paper. The government also objected when the Gaelic Athletic Association (GAA) removed President Douglas Hyde as a patron, and stopped inviting him to its matches, after he attended an Irish international soccer match in 1938. At the end of Hyde's term, Taoiseach Éamon de Valera secured the GAA's agreement that in future it would invite the President to major functions as a matter of course rather than after taking regard for his conduct in office.

The Constitution does not define precedence, prompting Myles na gCopaleen to ask, "Can the President jump a bus queue?" The state directory published by the Institute of Public Administration states that the President takes precedence within the country in all formal addresses and at all functions social or ceremonial. In the 1950s, when President Seán T. O'Kelly was to host a dinner for Ettore Felici, the papal nuncio to Ireland, the President's office asked the Department of External Affairs whether the first toast should be for the President or the Pope; the department responded that there was no doubt that the first toast at a function should be 'President of Ireland'.

== Government and Oireachtas ==
When a newly appointed Taoiseach re-enters the Dáil (lower house) with his nominated government ministers, these are traditionally ordered: Taoiseach, Tánaiste, Minister for Finance, then others based on length of previous ministerial service, ending with first-time ministers based on length of Oireachtas (parliament) service. Enda Kenny broke this convention in 2016 to bring female ministers to the front of the line. The order in which the Taoiseach reads out the names of the ministers in the Dáil chamber becomes their de facto order of precedence. Garret FitzGerald, noted that at cabinet meetings "Ministers always sat in whatever place they chose by chance at their first Government meeting".

In Dáil standing orders, the only members (TDs) who are referred to by title are the chair (Ceann Comhairle, Leas-Cheann Comhairle, or temporary chair), government ministers, and ministers of state. Private members, including opposition party leaders, are addressed as "Deputy <name>".

== Local government ==
Some county councils and city councils state that the council's mayor or cathaoirleach, if attending a function within the county or city in an official capacity, is expected to take precedence over everyone except the President of Ireland if present. The medieval characterisation of a mayor as "first citizen" is still found. Thus, for example, the Lord Mayor of Dublin has precedence over the Taoiseach within the city of Dublin.

Prior to the Local Government Reform Act 2014, the mayor or cathaoirleach of a borough or town council took precedence within the town over the mayor or cathaoirleach of the council of the county within which the town was located. The 2014 Act abolished borough and town councils, as well as the city councils of Limerick and Waterford. It created municipal district councils; these are sub-units of the county councils (or city and county council in the case of Limerick and Waterford), whose mayor or cathaoirleach does not take precedence over the county mayor. The Mayor of Waterford, now head of a metropolitan district council rather than a city council, complained at being outranked by the Cathaoirleach and Leas-Cathaoirleach of the merged city-and-county council. A similar change affected the Mayor of Limerick within the new Limerick City and County Council.

In multiple-seat local electoral areas for urban councils, the first councillor elected formerly held the symbolic title alderman, until the distinction was abolished by the Local Government Act 2001. Aldermen were ranked by seniority of first election to the council.

== Diplomatic corps ==
The Irish Free State became independent in 1922, and after a 1928 visit from Frank B. Kellogg, the U.S. Secretary of State, the Department of External Affairs began consultation on diplomatic protocol, including establishing policy on precedence.

The papal nuncio to Ireland, as ambassador of the Holy See, is dean of the diplomatic corps and takes precedence over other ambassadors, who are ranked by seniority of appointment. The papal nuncio exception is permitted under the 1961 Vienna Convention on Diplomatic Relations. The 1961 treaty recognised a custom already widespread and present in Ireland since the first nuncio was appointed in 1930, when he was second in overall precedence to the Governor-General of the Irish Free State. After the nuncio, the next ambassador-level appointment was V. K. Krishna Menon of India in 1949; other heads of mission having the lower rank of envoy extraordinary and minister plenipotentiary or high commissioner. Menon, accredited just after Ireland left the Commonwealth, thereby outranked other Commonwealth envoys, to the displeasure of Gilbert Laithwaite, the United Kingdom Representative.

== Judges and barristers ==
The Courts of Justice Act 1924, as amended, provides for the order of precedence between judges of the superior courts as follows:

1. the Chief Justice;
2. the President of the Court of Appeal;
3. the President of the High Court;
4. former Chief Justices in order of appointment;
5. ordinary judges of the Supreme Court (excluding ex officio judges) in order of appointment;
6. judges of the Court of Appeal who are ex officio judges of the Supreme Court (being former Presidents of the Court of Appeal or of the High Court) in order of appointment as President of the respective court;
7. judges of the High Court who are ex officio judges of the Supreme Court (being former Presidents of the High Court) in order of appointment as President of the High Court. (Note: The Court of Appeal was created in 2014 pursuant to a 2013 constitutional amendment. Subsequently, the President of the High Court has been ex officio a judge of the Court of Appeal, but not so for earlier Presidents, who consequently have lower precedence.)
8. judges of the Court of Appeal in order of appointment;
9. ordinary judges of the High Court (excluding ex officio judges) in order of appointment;
10. the President of the Circuit Court by virtue of being an ex officio judge of the High Court;
11. former Presidents of the Circuit Court in order of appointment.

The act also prescribes that the precedence of "ordinary judges" of the Circuit Court is by date of appointment; this excludes the "specialist judges" introduced in 2012 for personal insolvency cases.

Frances Fitzgerald, then Minister for Justice and Equality, explained the purpose of the provision in Seanad Éireann at its revision in 2014:

I wish to make the point that precedence and the order does not have anything to do with salaries. It is a well established hierarchical structure. It is interesting to note, for example, that in some legislation one will have inbuilt in the legislation a particular order in which a particular issue is dealt with. Therefore, the listing and, if one likes, hierarchical structure can address the issue. In certain contexts provision is made for the next most senior judge to hear a case or organise the business of the court so there is an order of precedence imported in that context. It is to deal with those issues that we have set out the order in section 28 and that is the only reason.

A patent of precedence is used to assign the title Senior Counsel to a practising barrister, or since 2020 to a practising solicitor. Among barristers, in professional contexts, the Attorney General of Ireland takes precedence, followed by senior counsel in order of call to the [inner] bar, followed by junior counsel in order of either call to the [outer] bar or date of joining the Bar Council's Law Library. (Note: The latter provision applies to those accredited by a foreign body reciprocally recognised by the Irish bar council.) In non-professional contexts, seniority is usually by call to the outer bar, with the "Father/Mother of the Bar" ranked first; at King's Inns dinners, Benchers have precedence, at Circuit functions, members of the host circuit may take precedence.

== State ceremonies ==
At the 1963 state banquet during John F. Kennedy's visit to Ireland, the Irish seated at the top table included the Taoiseach, Tánaiste, Minister for Finance, Minister for External Affairs, Catholic Archbishop of Dublin, and Leader of the Opposition.

At the 1973 presidential inauguration of Erskine H. Childers the seating plan in St. Patrick's Hall was:

Dais
Outgoing president Éamon de Valera; Incoming president Childers and wife Rita; Government ministers; Council of State
Block A	Block B
Diplomatic corps; Relatives and friends of Childers	Church leaders; Parliamentary secretaries; Tom O'Higgins (loser of the 1973 presidential election); "VIP" Oireachtas members, i.e.: Leas Cathaoirleach, former ministers, former parliamentary secretaries; Departmental secretaries; Chaplains
Block C	Block D
Judiciary; Relatives and friends of Childers	Mayors and chairs of city and county councils; Oireachtas members
Block E	Block F
Oireachtas members	Civil service; Defence Forces; Garda Síochána; Newspaper editors
Block G	Block H
"Universities, etc."; Seanad nominating bodies	Oireachtas; "National organisations"; "Other bodies"

== See also ==
- Order of precedence in Ireland (1897–1922)
