= Aughareamlagh =

Townland in County Antrim, Northern Ireland

Coordinates: 54°57′27″N 6°1′40″W

Aughareamlagh: Irish: Achadh Ramalach
- Location within Northern Ireland
- County: County Antrim
- Country: Northern Ireland
- Sovereign state: United Kingdom
- Police: Northern Ireland
- Fire: Northern Ireland
- Ambulance: Northern Ireland

Aughareamlagh (from Irish Achadh Ramalach, meaning 'field of stagnant water') is a townland of 800 acres in County Antrim, Northern Ireland. It is situated approximately 2.6 miles (4.2 km) southwest of Carnlough, in the civil parish of Tickmacrevan and the historic barony of Glenarm Lower. Aughareamlagh was known for its bauxite mining.

There is a fork in the road between the A42 road (Carnough Road) and Slane Road in the area. The main landmark is the Mullaghwee Self Catering Farmhouse along Slane Road.

== See also ==
- List of townlands in County Antrim
- List of places in County Antrim
