= Randal McDonnell, 8th Earl of Antrim =

British diplomat, activist, soldier & administrator (1911-1977)

The Earl in August 1965.

Randal John Somerled McDonnell, 8th Earl of Antrim KBE (1911–1977) was a diplomat, activist, soldier and administrator. He became chairman of the National Trust in 1965.

== Life ==
He was the son of Randal Mark Kerr McDonnell, 7th Earl of Antrim, and his wife, Margaret Isabel Talbot, daughter of John Gilbert Talbot. He was educated at Eton College and at Christ Church, Oxford, where he was a friend of Evelyn Waugh, and left without taking a degree. He succeeded his father in 1932. In 1937 Antrim visited Valencia, during the Spanish Civil War, with Cyril Connolly.

During the Second World War Antrim was a Royal Navy officer, with the rank of Lieutenant-Commander. With the Special Operations Executive and Peter Fleming he served in various theatres of war.

In 1965, Antrim and eleven other Irish peers presented a petition to the House of Lords arguing that the law still provided for Irish representative peers to represent Ireland. Henry Moore, 10th Earl of Drogheda, had continued to sit as one until 1954, long after the creation of the Irish Free State, and it was simply a question of providing a new mechanism for the elections. However, the Lords rejected the petition.

Antrim was Chairman of the National Trust from 1965 to 1977.

== Family ==
Antrim married the artist Angela Sykes in 1934: she was the daughter of Sir Mark Sykes, 6th Baronet, and sister of Christopher Sykes. They lived at Glenarm Castle.

They had three sons, one of whom died young, and a daughter Lady Christina who married Joseph Hoare, son of Sir Reginald Hervey Hoare. The elder surviving son Alexander succeeded his father as Earl; the younger son was Hector McDonnell the artist.

== Notes ==
Peerage of Ireland
Preceded by Randal McDonell	Earl of Antrim; 1932–1977	Succeeded by Alexander McDonnell
