= Carnalbanagh =

Village in County Antrim, Northern Ireland

Coordinates: 54.901°N 6.081°W

Carnalbanagh: Scots: Carn Albanach
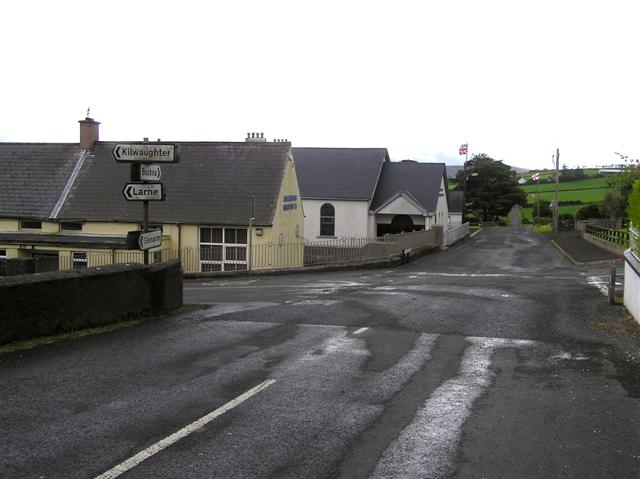
- Carnalbanagh in 2007

- Location within Northern Ireland
- District: Mid and East Antrim
- County: County Antrim
- Country: Northern Ireland
- Sovereign state: United Kingdom
- Postcode district: BT
- Police: Northern Ireland
- Fire: Northern Ireland
- Ambulance: Northern Ireland

Carnalbanagh or Carn Albanagh (from Irish Carn Albanach 'cairn of the Scotsmen') is a small village and townland (of 1,628 acres) in County Antrim, Northern Ireland, 13 km east-north-east of Ballymena. It is in the civil parish of Tickmacrevan and the historic barony of Glenarm Lower, and is part of Mid and East Antrim district. It is near Glenarm and Mount Slemish.

The name is said to derive from a cairn marking the site of a battle fought in 1315 during the Scottish Bruce campaign in Ireland.

Local services include an Orange Hall and Presbyterian church. The local flute band is known as Carnalbanagh Flute Band. The primary school closed in 2021.

== See also ==
- List of towns and villages in Northern Ireland
- List of townlands in County Antrim
