= Dalriada (disambiguation) =

Dalriada can refer to:

- Dál Riata, a Gaelic kingdom in western Scotland and north-east Ireland in the Early Middle Ages
- Dalriada Festival, a festival in Glenarm, Northern Ireland
- Dalriada School, a co-educational, voluntary grammar school in Ballymoney, Northern Ireland
- Dalriada (band), Hungarian folk metal band
