= Randal McDonnell, 10th Earl of Antrim =

Northern Irish landowner and businessman

Arms of the Earl of Antrim

Randal Alexander McDonnell, 10th Earl of Antrim DL (born 2 July 1967), previously known as Viscount Dunluce, is a Northern Irish landowner, with an estate based at Glenarm Castle, and a City of London businessman, chairman of Sarasin & Partners LLP a subsidiary of J. Safra Sarasin. He is also a Deputy Lieutenant of County Antrim.

== Early life and education ==
The only son of Alexander McDonnell, 9th Earl of Antrim, and a grandson of the sculptor Angela Sykes, the present Lord Antrim was educated at Gresham's School and Worcester College, Oxford, where he graduated in Modern History. He is the nephew of the artist Hector McDonnell.

== Career ==
After Oxford, Dunluce, as he then was, embarked on a career in asset management in the City of London. In 1992, when he was twenty-five, his father put him in charge of the Glenarm Castle estate, and in that role he invested in Glenarm Shorthorn Beef, Glenarm Organic Salmon and hydroelectric power. During his tenure, the Glenarm estate was developed to include visitor facilities and a restored Walled Garden, while its agricultural activities included a herd of Beef Shorthorn cattle. Glenarm Castle was first built in 1603 by Antrim's ancestor Randal MacSorley MacDonnell.

He was an investment manager at NCL Investments from 1993 to 1997. In 1998 he began to work at Sarasin & Partners LLP, where he has been chairman since 2008, taking responsibility for the investment mandates of the firm's largest customers and its charitable endowments. He managed the creation of the Sarrasin presence in Dublin and is also a non-executive director of Aberdeen Standard Asia Focus PLC. In 2002, he was a member of three London clubs, the Savile, the Turf, and the Beefsteak.

In December 2013, as Dunluce, he was appointed a Deputy Lieutenant for County Antrim.

When his father died on 21 July 2021, Antrim inherited the earldom, subsidiary titles and estates.

In November 2021, Antrim, Edwin Poots, and local children planted the first trees of 350 hectares of new native woodland on Antrim's estate at Glenarm Forest. Poots, who was then Northern Ireland's Minister of Agriculture, Environment and Rural Affairs, announced this as Northern Ireland's first Queen's Commonwealth Canopy forest conservation project.

== Marriage and children ==
Lord Antrim married Aurora Gunn in 2004. Lady Antrim is a documentary filmmaker and member of the board of the Royal Parks.

They have two children:

- Alexander David Somerled McDonnell, Viscount Dunluce (born 30 June 2006), heir apparent to the earldom.
- Lady Helena Maeve Aurora McDonnell (born 19 February 2008)

== Notes ==
Peerage of Ireland
Preceded by Alexander McDonnell	Earl of Antrim; 2021–	Incumbent
