= Ault, Northern Ireland =

Townland in County Antrim, Northern Ireland

Coordinates: 54°55′51″N 5°56′43″W

Ault, Northern Ireland: Irish: Allt
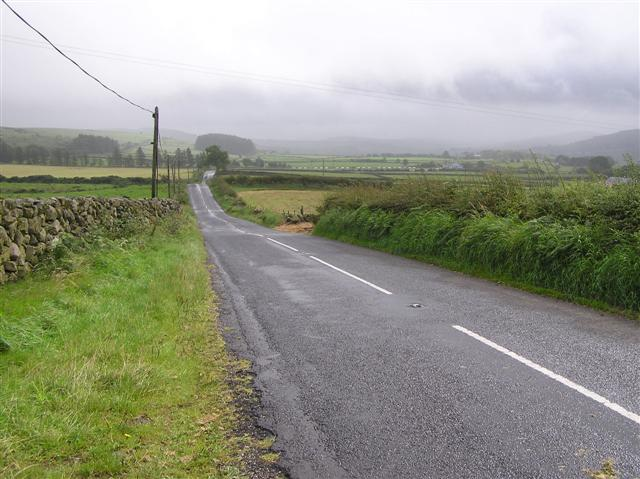
- Ault townland in 2007
- County: County Antrim
- Country: Northern Ireland
- Sovereign state: United Kingdom
- Police: Northern Ireland
- Fire: Northern Ireland
- Ambulance: Northern Ireland

Ault (from Irish Allt, meaning 'ravine'), also known as Gowkstown, is a townland of 367 acres in County Antrim, Northern Ireland. 7 miles (11 km) north-west of Larne, it is in the civil parish of Tickmacrevan and the historic barony of Glenarm Lower.

The townland contains a wedge tomb (Giant’s Grave) registered as a Scheduled Historic Monument at grid ref: D3161 1082. The wedge tomb is set in a long cairn aligned south-west/north-east, with a single large burial chamber and small antechamber. The antechamber has a straight stone facade and the burial chamber is formed from a number of large stones, with one lintel stone in place. There is an outer kerb of closely spaced boulders (with over 25 stones in place) and the space between the kerb and the burial chamber is filled with cairn material.

== See also ==
- List of townlands in County Antrim
- List of places in County Antrim
