= Order of precedence in Ireland (1897–1922) =

Relative preeminence of officials for ceremonial purposes

The order of precedence in Ireland was fixed by Royal Warrant on 2 January 1897 during Ireland's ties to the United Kingdom of Great Britain and Ireland.

This is a listing who were the office holders on 6 December 1922.

== Gentlemen ==
=== Royal family and Lord Lieutenant ===
Title	Name	Ref
The Sovereign (regardless of sex)	King George V	
The Lord Lieutenant	Edmund FitzAlan-Howard, 1st Viscount FitzAlan of Derwent	
Eldest Son of the Sovereign	Edward, Prince of Wales	
Younger Sons of the Sovereign	Prince Albert, Duke of York; The Prince Henry; The Prince George	
Grandsons of the Sovereign	of which there are none	
Brothers of the Sovereign	of which there are none	
Uncles of the Sovereign	Prince Arthur, Duke of Connaught and Strathearn	
Nephews of the Sovereign	of which there are none	

=== Archbishops, High Officers of State, et al. ===
- Ambassadors
- Lord Mayor of Dublin (only within the precincts of the City of Dublin)
  - Laurence O'Neill
- Archbishop of Canterbury (Randall Davidson)
- Lord High Chancellor of Great Britain (George Cave, 1st Viscount Cave)
- Archbishop of York (Cosmo Gordon Lang)
- Archbishops of Armagh
  - Catholic (Cardinal Michael Logue)
  - Church of Ireland (Charles D'Arcy)
- Lord High Chancellor of Ireland (if a peer)
- Archbishops of Dublin
  - Catholic (Edward Joseph Byrne)
  - Church of Ireland (John Gregg)
- Moderator of the General Assembly of the Presbyterian Church in Ireland (William Gordon Strahan)
- The Lord High Chancellor of Ireland (not being a peer)
  - Sir John Ross, 1st Baronet
- Lord High Treasurer of Ireland (none; in commission since 1817)
- Lord President of the Council (being a Baron, or higher in degree)
  - James Gascoyne-Cecil, 4th Marquess of Salisbury
- The Lord Privy Seal (being a Baron, or higher in degree)
  - Vacant
- Lord Great Chamberlain (Charles Wynn-Carington, 1st Marquess of Lincolnshire)
- Lord High Constable of Ireland (office only in existence for coronations)
- Earl Marshal (Bernard Fitzalan-Howard, 16th Duke of Norfolk)
- Lord High Admiral (none; in commission since 1828)
- Lord Steward of the Household (Anthony Ashley-Cooper, 9th Earl of Shaftesbury)
- Lord Chamberlain of the Household (Rowland Baring, 2nd Earl of Cromer)
- Lord High Steward of Ireland (John Chetwynd-Talbot, 21st Earl of Waterford)

=== Nobility, bishops, et al. ===
==== Dukes, et al. ====
- Dukes of England (ordered according to date of creation)
  - The Duke of Norfolk, who ranked higher as Earl Marshal
- Dukes of Scotland (ordered according to date of creation)
- Dukes of Great Britain (ordered according to date of creation)
- Dukes of Ireland before 1801
  - Edward FitzGerald, 7th Duke of Leinster
- Dukes of United Kingdom and Ireland created after 1801 (ordered according to date of creation)
- Eldest sons of Dukes of the Blood Royal
  - Prince Arthur of Connaught
- Foreign Ministers and Envoys

==== Marquesses, et al. ====
- Marquesses of England (ordered according to date of creation)
- Marquesses of Scotland (ordered according to date of creation)
- Marquesses of Great Britain (ordered according to date of creation)
- Marquesses of Ireland before 1801 (ordered according to date of creation)
  - John Beresford, 7th Marquess of Waterford
  - Arthur Hill, 7th Marquess of Downshire
  - Edward Chichester, 6th Marquess of Donegall
  - Terence Taylour, 5th Marquess of Headfort
  - Terence Browne, 9th Marquess of Sligo
  - George Loftus, 7th Marquess of Ely
- Marquesses of United Kingdom and Ireland created after 1801 excepting:
  - The Marquess of Lincolnshire, who ranked higher as Lord Great Chamberlain
- Eldest sons of Dukes according to their Fathers' precedence

==== Earls, et al. ====
- Earls of England (ordered according to date of creation)
- Earls of Scotland (ordered according to the Decreet of Ranking of 1606 and to date of creation)
- Earls of Great Britain (ordered according to date of creation)
- Earls of Ireland created before 1801 (ordered according to date of creation)
  - John Chetwynd-Talbot, 21st Earl of Waterford
  - Charles Boyle, 10th Earl of Cork and Orrery
  - Anthony Nugent, 11th Earl of Westmeath
  - Reginald Brabazon, 12th Earl of Meath
  - Arthur James Francis Plunkett, 11th Earl of Fingall
  - William Feilding, 10th Earl of Denbigh
  - Rudolph Lambart, 10th Earl of Cavan
  - Charles Moore, 11th Earl of Drogheda
  - Bernard Forbes, 8th Earl of Granard
  - Peter Wentworth-Fitzwilliam, 8th Earl Fitzwilliam
  - Ivo Bligh, 8th Earl of Darnley
  - Charles Perceval, 9th Earl of Egmont
  - Frederick Ponsonby, 10th Earl of Bessborough
  - Brian Butler, 9th Earl of Carrick
  - Robert Boyle, 8th Earl of Shannon
  - Charles Butler, 7th Earl of Lanesborough
  - Arthur Gore, 8th Earl of Arran
  - James Stopford, 7th Earl of Courtown
  - John Savile, 7th Earl of Mexborough
  - Edward Turnour, 6th Earl Winterton
  - Henry King-Tenison, 9th Earl of Kingston
  - Osbert Molyneux, 6th Earl of Sefton
  - Robert Jocelyn, 8th Earl of Roden
  - Ernest Vaughan, 7th Earl of Lisburne
  - John Charles Edmund Carson Meade, 6th Earl of Clanwilliam
  - Randal Mark Kerr McDonnell, 7th Earl of Antrim
  - Edward Pakenham, 6th Earl of Longford
  - Lionel Dawson-Damer, 6th Earl of Portarlington
  - Walter Bourke, 8th Earl of Mayo
  - Robert Annesley, 9th Earl Annesley
  - John Crichton, 5th Earl Erne
  - Lowry Cole, 4th Earl of Enniskillen
  - William Howard, 8th Earl of Wicklow
  - Rupert Scott, 7th Earl of Clonmell
  - Hamilton Cuffe, 5th Earl of Desart
  - George Bingham, 5th Earl of Lucan
  - Charles Clements, 5th Earl of Leitrim
  - Armar Lowry-Corry, 5th Earl Belmore
  - James Bernard, 4th Earl of Bandon
  - Arthur Stuart, 7th Earl Castle Stewart
  - Eric Alexander, 5th Earl of Caledon
  - Richard Hely-Hutchinson, 6th Earl of Donoughmore
- Earls of the United Kingdom and of Ireland created after 1801 (ordered according to date of creation)
- Younger sons of Dukes of the Blood Royal (of which there are none)
- Eldest sons of Marquesses according to their Fathers' precedence
- Younger sons of Dukes

==== Viscounts, et al. ====
- Viscounts of England (ordered according to date of creation)
- Viscounts of Scotland (ordered according to date of creation)
- Viscounts of Great Britain (ordered according to date of creation)
- Viscounts of Ireland created before 1801 (ordered according to date of creation)
  - Jenico Preston, 14th Viscount Gormanston
  - Piers Butler, 16th Viscount Mountgarret
  - Harold Dillon, 17th Viscount Dillon
  - Arthur Annesley, 11th Viscount Valentia
  - Algernon Skeffington, 12th Viscount Massereene
  - James Caulfeild, 8th Viscount Charlemont
  - Hugh Dawnay, 8th Viscount Downe
  - George Molesworth, 9th Viscount Molesworth
  - Godfrey Chetwynd, 8th Viscount Chetwynd
  - St John Brodrick, 1st Earl of Midleton
  - Gustavus Hamilton-Russell, 9th Viscount Boyne
  - Henry Gage, 6th Viscount Gage
  - George Monckton-Arundell, 7th Viscount Galway
  - Mervyn Wingfield, 8th Viscount Powerscourt
  - Llowarch Flower, 9th Viscount Ashbrook
  - William de Montmorency, 6th Viscount Mountmorres
  - Arthur Southwell, 5th Viscount Southwell
  - Yvo Vesey, 5th Viscount de Vesci
  - Thomas Agar-Robartes, 6th Viscount Clifden
  - Archibald Hewitt, 6th Viscount Lifford
  - Edward St Leger, 6th Viscount Doneraile
  - Ernest Pomeroy, 7th Viscount Harberton
- Viscounts of the United Kingdom and of Ireland created after 1801 (ordered according to date of creation)
  - The Viscount FitzAlan of Derwent, who ranked higher as the Lord Lieutenant
- Eldest sons of Earl's according to their Fathers' precedence
- Younger sons of Marquesses according to their Fathers' precedence

==== Bishops ====
- Bishop of London (Arthur Winnington-Ingram)
- Bishop of Durham (Hensley Henson)
- Bishop of Winchester (Edward Talbot)
- All Other English Bishops according to seniority of confirmation of election
- Irish Bishops

==== Barons ====
- Secretaries of State and Chief Secretary being of the degree of a baron
  - Secretary of State for the Colonies (Victor Cavendish, 9th Duke of Devonshire)
  - Secretary of State for Foreign and Commonwealth Affairs (George Curzon, 1st Marquess Curzon of Kedleston)
  - Secretary of State for War (Edward Stanley, 17th Earl of Derby)
  - Secretary of State for India (William Peel, 1st Earl Peel)
- Barons of England (ordered according to date of creation)
- Scottish Lords of Parliament (ordered according to date of creation)
- Barons of Great Britain (ordered according to date of creation)
- Barons of Ireland created before 1801 (ordered according to date of creation)
- Barons of the United Kingdom and of Ireland created after 1801

=== Gentry, et al. ===
==== Royal Household officials ====
- Speaker of the House of Commons (John Henry Whitley MP)
- Lords Commissioners of the Great Seal (none; last appointed in 1850)
- Treasurer of the Household (George Gibbs MP)
- Comptroller of the Household (Harry Barnston MP)
- Master of the Horse (Thomas Thynne, 5th Marquess of Bath)
- Vice-Chamberlain of the Household (Douglas Hacking MP)
- Secretaries of State and Chief Secretary for Ireland if under the degree of a baron
  - Air Secretary (Sir Samuel Hoare MP)
  - Home Secretary (William Bridgeman MP)
  - Chief Secretary for Ireland (Office abolished)
- Eldest Sons of Viscounts
- Younger Sons of Earls
- Eldest Sons of Barons

==== Knights of the Garter, Knights of the Thistle and Knights of St Patrick ====
- Knights of the Garter (KG)
- Knights of the Thistle (KT)
- Knights of St Patrick (KP)

==== Privy Counsellors, et al. ====
- Privy Counsellors (PC (Ire)) (ordered according to date of oath-taking)
  - General Officer Commanding the Forces in Ireland and Attorney-General (unless of personal rank) have this precedence, being always Privy Counsellors, and ranking as such, according to the dates of their being sworn in.
- Chancellor of the Exchequer (Stanley Baldwin MP)
- Chancellor of the Duchy of Lancaster (James Gascoyne-Cecil, 4th Marquess of Salisbury, who ranked higher as Lord President of the Privy Council)

==== Senior judges, et al. ====
- Lord Chief Justice (Thomas Molony)
- Master of the Rolls (Charles O'Connor)
- Lord Chief Baron of the Exchequer (Vacant)
- Lord Justices of the Court of Appeal
- Vice-Chancellor
- Judges of the High Court of Justice, King's Bench Division (ordered according to seniority of appointment)
- Judicial Commissioner of the Irish Land Commission, being a Judge of the High Court of Justice (ordered according to seniority of appointment)
- Land Judges of the Chancery Division, High Court of Justice (ordered according to seniority of appointment)
- Younger Sons of Viscounts
- Younger Sons of Barons
- Sons of the Lords of Appeal in Ordinary

==== Baronets ====
- Baronets (Bt) (ordered according to date of creation)

==== Knights ====
- Knights Grand Cross
  - Knights Grand Cross of the Order of the Bath (GCB)
  - Knights Grand Commander of the Order of the Star of India (GCSI)
  - Knights Grand Cross of the Order of St Michael and St George (GCMG)
  - Knights Grand Commander of the Order of the Indian Empire (GCIE)
  - Knights Grand Cross of the Royal Victorian Order (GCVO)
  - Knights Grand Cross of the Order of the British Empire (GBE)
- Knights Commander
  - Knights Commander of the Order of the Bath (KCB)
  - Knights Commander of the Order of the Star of India (KCSI)
  - Knights Commander of the Order of St Michael and St George (KCMG)
  - Knights Commander of the Order of the Indian Empire (KCIE)
  - Knights Commander of the Royal Victorian Order (KCVO)
  - Knights Commander of the Order of the British Empire (KBE)
- Knights Bachelor (Kt)

=== Other lower ranks, including Esquires and Gentlemen ===
==== Companions and commanders of various orders ====
- Companions of the Order of the Bath (CB)
- Companions of the Order of the Star of India (CSI)
- Companions of the Order of St Michael and St George (CMG)
- Companions of the Order of the Indian Empire (CIE)'
- Commanders of the Royal Victorian Order (CVO)
- Commanders of the Order of the British Empire (CBE)
- Companions of the Distinguished Service Order (DSO)

==== Lower level judges, et al. ====
- The Attorney-General (Office abolished)
- The Solicitor-General (Office abolished)
- The Serjeant-at-law
- Judges of County Court

==== Lieutenants and officers of various orders ====
- Lieutenants of the Royal Victorian Order (LVO)
- Officers of the Order of the British Empire (OBE)
- Companions of the Imperial Service Order (ISO)
