= Louisa McDonnell, Countess of Antrim =

British aristocrat

The Right Honourable Countess of Antrim
- The Countess of Antrim on the occasion of the coronation of King George V in 1911
- Born: Louisa Jane Grey; 15 February 1855; St James's Palace, London
- Died: 2 April 1949 (aged 94); London
- Noble family: Grey
- Spouses: William Randal McDonnell, 6th Earl of Antrim (m. 1875; died 1918)
- Issue: Lady Sybil Mary McDonnell; Randal Mark Kerr McDonnell, 7th Earl of Antrim; Hon. Angus McDonnell
- Father: Charles Grey
- Mother: Caroline Eliza Farquhar
- Occupation: Lady of the Bedchamber to Queen Victoria and Queen Alexandra

Louisa Jane McDonnell, Countess of Antrim, VA (née Grey; 15 February 1855 – 2 April 1949) was a British noblewoman and courtier.

== Biography ==
Lady Antrim was born at St James's Palace, the daughter of Gen. Hon. Charles Grey (a son of the 2nd Earl Grey and Private Secretary to Prince Albert) and his wife, Caroline Eliza née Farquhar (daughter of Sir Thomas Harvie Farquhar). She had one brother, Albert Grey, 4th Earl Grey and her three sisters Sybil, Duchess of St Albans (wife of 10th Duke of St Albans), Lady Victoria Dawnay (wife of Lewis Payn Dawnay), and Mary, Countess of Minto.

In 1890, the Countess became a Lady of the Bedchamber to Queen Victoria, serving until the latter's death in January 1901. She was reappointed under Queen Alexandra one month later, serving until Edward VII's death in 1910. As a lady of the court, the countess often accompanied the Queen to official engagements, and served in waiting on the Queen at one of the royal palaces for scheduled months. In April 1900 she accompanied Queen Victoria on her first visit to Ireland since 1861.

She married in the Chapel Royal at St. James's Palace on 1 June 1875 the 6th Earl of Antrim. They had three children:

- Lady Sybil Mary McDonnell (26 March 1876 – 16 April 1959), married Vivian Smith, 1st Baron Bicester.
- Randal Mark Kerr McDonnell, 7th Earl of Antrim (10 December 1878 – 15 June 1932)
- Hon. Angus McDonnell (7 June 1881 – 22 April 1966)

The Countess of Antrim died in London in 1949, aged 94.
