= Unshinagh Mountain =

Unshinagh Mountain: Irish: Sliabh Uinseannach
- County: County Antrim
- Country: Northern Ireland
- Sovereign state: United Kingdom
- Police: Northern Ireland
- Fire: Northern Ireland
- Ambulance: Northern Ireland

Unshinagh Mountain (from Irish Uinseanach, meaning 'place of ash trees') is a townland of 635 acres in County Antrim, Northern Ireland. It is situated in the civil parish of Tickmacrevan and the historic barony of Glenarm Lower.

== See also ==
- List of townlands in County Antrim
- List of places in County Antrim
