= Randal McDonnell, 7th Earl of Antrim =

British landowner and peer (1878–1933)

The Right Honourable The Earl of Antrim DL
- Born: 1878; St James's Palace
- Died: 1933 (aged 54–55)
- Other names: Viscount Dunluce
- Occupation: Deputy Lord Lieutenant of County Antrim
- Spouse: Margaret Isabel Talbot
- Children: 4, including Randal
- Parent(s): William McDonnell, 6th Earl of Antrim; Lady Louisa Grey

Randal Mark Kerr McDonnell, 7th Earl of Antrim DL (1878–1933) was an Irish landowner and peer, known as Viscount Dunluce until 1918.

== Early life ==
Antrim was born at St James's Palace, the son of William McDonnell, 6th Earl of Antrim, whose main seat was Glenarm Castle, which he inherited, with his father's peerages, in 1918. His mother was Lady Louisa Grey, sister of Albert Grey, 4th Earl Grey and granddaughter of Prime Minister Lord Grey.

Antrim's middle names commemorated his descent in the male line from Lord Mark Kerr, whose wife inherited the Earldom of Antrim. Their son, Hugh Seymour Kerr, succeeded to the Earldom in due course and assumed the surname of McDonnell in 1836. Through William Kerr, 5th Marquess of Lothian, Antrim was also a descendant of Charles Louis, Elector Palatine, and thus in the Jacobite succession to the throne.

== Career ==
Educated at Eton College and the Royal Military College, Sandhurst, he was commissioned into the Royal Lancaster Regiment. He was later appointed as a Deputy Lord Lieutenant of County Antrim.

== Personal life ==
He married Margaret Isabel Talbot, a daughter of John Gilbert Talbot, and they had four children:

1. Lady Rose Gwendolen Louisa McDonnell (1909–1993)
2. Randal John Somerled McDonnell, 8th Earl of Antrim (1911–1977)
3. Lady Jean Meriel McDonnell (1914–1998)
4. Hon. James Angus Grey McDonnell (1917–2005)

Lord Antrim died in 1933 and was succeeded by his eldest son, Randal.

== Notes ==
Peerage of Ireland
Preceded by William McDonnell, 6th Earl of Antrim	Earl of Antrim; 1918–1932	Succeeded by Randal McDonnell
