= Tickmacrevan =

- County: County Antrim
- Country: Northern Ireland
- Sovereign state: United Kingdom
- Police: Northern Ireland
- Fire: Northern Ireland
- Ambulance: Northern Ireland

Tickmacrevan is a civil parish in County Antrim, Northern Ireland. It is situated in the historic barony of Glenarm Lower.

== Civil parish of Tickmacrevan ==
The civil parish includes the villages of Carnlough and Glenarm.

== Townlands ==
The civil parish contains the following townlands:

- Aughaboy
- Aughareamlagh
- Ault (also known as Gowkstown)
- Ballyvaddy
- Bay
- Bellair
- Burns Libbert
- Carnalbanagh
- Carnave
- Carrive
- Clady
- Cregcattan, part of Galdanagh
- Deer Park Farms
- Deer Park Great
- Deer Park Little
- Demesne Upper
- Dickey's Town
- Doonan
- Drumcrow
- Druminagh
- Drumnacole
- Drumourne
- Dunarragan
- Dunteige
- Galdanagh
- Gartford
- Glebe
- Glenarm Demesne
- Glore
- Gortcarney
- Gowkstown (also known as Ault)
- Harphall
- Libbert East
- Libbert West
- Longfield
- Minnis North
- Mullaghconnelly
- Munie North
- Munie South
- Old Church
- Owencloghy
- Parishagh
- Stony Hill
- Town Parks
- Tully
- Unshinagh Mountain
- Unshinagh North
- Unshinagh South

== See also ==
- List of townlands in County Antrim
- List of civil parishes of County Antrim
