= Angela MacDonnell, Countess of Antrim =

Countess of Antrim, a sculptor, a cartoonist, and an illustrator

The Right Honourable The Countess of Antrim
- Born: Angela Christina Sykes; 6 September 1911; Yorkshire, United Kingdom
- Died: 27 August 1984 (aged 72); Glenarm, Ireland
- Occupations: sculptor, cartoonist, illustrator, Peer
- Spouse: Randal McDonnell, 8th Earl of Antrim (m. 1934; died 1977)
- Children: 4, including Alexander, 9th Earl of Antrim and Hector
- Father: Sir Mark Sykes

Angela Christina MacDonnell, Countess of Antrim (6 September 1911 – 27 August 1984), also known as Angela Antrim, was Countess of Antrim, a sculptor, a cartoonist, and an illustrator.

== Early life and education ==
Angela Christina Sykes was born 6 September 1911 at Eddlethorpe, near Malton in Yorkshire, as the fifth child and youngest daughter of a total of three sons and three daughters to Sir Mark Sykes, 6th Baronet of Sledmere, and Lady Edith Violet Sykes (née Gorst). She was educated privately before going to Brussels to train under Marnix d'Haveloose. After that she attended the British School in Rome for six months. When Sykes returned to London she established her own studio near Regent's Park. It was there she began to sculpt in stone.

== Career and family ==
In 1928, she showed Mother and child and Woman and child at the Royal Academy. Her first one-person show was almost ten years later, in 1937 at the Beaux Arts Gallery in London where she showed eighteen pieces of sculpture and five cartoon. Some of the pieces she carved displayed expressions of medieval sculpture while others were more political such as an anti—fascist piece depicting a figure in a German helmet which was smashed sometime after being rejected by the Royal Academy but displayed at Whitechapel Gallery.

In 1934, she married the 8th Earl of Antrim (1911–1977), with whom she had three sons, including the artist Hector McDonnell and the heir, Alexander, 9th Earl of Antrim, and one daughter. One of their sons lived for a day. Their home was Glenarm Castle in County Antrim. From 11 May 1934, Sykes married name became McDonnell and she was styled Countess of Antrim. Lady Antrim, as she now was, became known for her witty caricature drawings which featured her relatives, such as The siege of Dunluce (c.1934–5).

Lady Antrim was active in the Women's Voluntary Service in the Second World War. She organised canteens and hostels as well as led a mobile hospital unit for rescued people from concentration camps through the Catholic Women's League in Ulster. Lady Antrim served with the Catholic Relief Services on missions in the Netherlands and Germany at the end of the war. Lady Antrim received the Papal decoration Pro Ecclesia et Pontifice in 1947.

Antrim exhibited Bronze head: Alexander (1948) and The descent from the cross (1949) at the Royal Hibernian Academy and they were the only two works shown there. In another solo exhibition in 1950, among the sculptures displayed was the Belsen mother and child. It was based on her experiences in the war relief efforts. The exhibition was at the Gallery for the Council for the Encouragement of Music and the Arts (CEMA). In 1961, Lady Antrim created the nativity scene design for the stained-glass window in the Church of the Immaculate Conception in Glenarm. She created the bronze sculpture of St Patrick in his youth for St Mary's Church, Feystown, County Antrim. The model for the piece was her own son, Hector. She created the paint of the apocalypse on the chancel ceiling of Holy Trinity Church, Edenbridge, Kent. In 1969, for the Broadway tower of the Royal Victoria Hospital, Belfast, she created the Hand of healing sculpture.

In 1951, she exhibited at the first show of the Contemporary Ulster Group. Other displays of her work took place in the Institute of the Sculptors of Ireland (1953–7) and the Royal Ulster Academy of Arts (1956).

An accident in 1962 left Angela Antrim, as she often called herself, unable to carve due to damage to her hand. At that point she began then to model her figures to allow them to be cast in bronze.

Throughout these years, Lady Antrim was integral to the art movement in Northern Ireland. She became an academician of the Royal Ulster Academy of the Arts in 1950, and was on their Art Advisory Committee. For many years she was a governor of the Belfast College of Art. From the foundation of Ulster Television in 1958, Angela Antrim was one of the directors. She was also a trustee of the Ulster Museum, Belfast, and was the chair of the museum's arts committee. She was President of the Institute of the Sculptors of Ireland in 1956. Lady Antrim chaired the organising committee of Art in worship today, an exhibition of postwar church building and works of art, shown in Belfast in 1968. She served on the Northern Ireland Arts Council, and was a founder and first president of the Association of Ulster Drama Festivals.

She illustrated several books. Two were written as Angela Antrim (she signed artwork as A. A.)

- The little round man (1977)
- The Antrim McDonnells (1977)
- The Yorkshire wold rangers (1981)

Lady Antrim was awarded an honorary LLD from Queen's University Belfast in 1971. Angela, Dowager Countess of Antrim, died at Glenarm Castle on 27 August 1984, and was buried in the MacDonnell family graveyard nearby.
