= Alexander McDonnell, 9th Earl of Antrim =

Irish peer (1935–2021)

Alexander Randal Mark McDonnell, 9th Earl of Antrim, FRSA (3 February 1935 – 21 July 2021), known as Alexander Dunluce, was a landowner, hereditary peer, artist, and art restorer.

He lived mostly at his ancestral home, Glenarm Castle, County Antrim, Ireland. As his titles were in the peerage of Ireland, he did not sit in the House of Lords.

== Early life and education ==
Lord Antrim was the eldest son of Randal McDonnell, 8th Earl of Antrim (1911–1977) and his artist wife Angela Sykes (1911–1984), daughter of Sir Mark Sykes, Bt. As heir apparent to his father's titles he was styled Viscount Dunluce from his birth until 1977.

Brought up as a Roman Catholic, Antrim was educated at Downside School, Christ Church, Oxford, and the Ruskin School of Drawing & Fine Art.

== Career ==
Lord Antrim worked as an art restorer for the Tate Gallery, holding the posts of Keeper of Conservation, 1975–1995, and Director of Collection Services, 1990–1995. He was also a Director of Ulster Television from 1982 to 2000, Chairman of Northern Salmon Co. Ltd, from 2000 to 2008, and Prime Warden of the Worshipful Company of Fishmongers for the year 1995–1996.

He was the first to spot the potential of Bankside Power Station as a site for the Tate Modern.

== Appointments ==
- Director of Ulster Television (UTV)
- Fellow of the Royal Society of Arts
- Member of the Marine Biological Association
- Patron of the Arts Society of Ulster

== Marriages and children ==
Antrim was married twice and had four children. Firstly, he married Sarah Harmsworth on 9 February 1963. They had three children:

- Lady Alice Angela Jane McDonnell (born 5 December 1964)
- Randal Alexander St John McDonnell, 10th Earl of Antrim (born 2 July 1967)

Antrim and his first wife divorced in 1974 and 21 October 1977 he married secondly Elizabeth Sacher. They had one daughter:

- Lady Rachel Frances McDonnell (born 24 February 1978)

His younger brother was the artist Hector McDonnell.

== Death ==
Lord Antrim died on 21 July 2021 from sepsis at the age of 86 after a short illness. His funeral was held at the Our Lady of Immaculate Conception Church in Glenarm.

== Sources ==
- The Complete Peerage, volume 14 (1998)
- Burke's Peerage and Baronetage, 106th Edition (1999)
- 9th Earl of Antrim at thepeerage.com

Peerage of Ireland
| Preceded by Randal McDonnell | Earl of Antrim; 1977–2021 | Succeeded by Randal Alexander McDonnell |
