= Hector McDonnell =

Northern Irish painter, etcher and author

The Hon. Hector John McDonnell (born 1947) is a Northern Irish painter, etcher, and author, specializing in architectural art, landscape, and portrait work.

== Early life and education ==
A younger son of Randal McDonnell, 8th Earl of Antrim, by his marriage to the sculptor Angela Sykes, and the younger brother of Alexander McDonnell, 9th Earl of Antrim, Hector McDonnell was born in Belfast. He grew up on the family estate at Glenarm, County Antrim, Northern Ireland, and was educated at Eton and Christ Church, Oxford, where he read modern history. In 1965 and 1966, before going up to Oxford, he studied painting in Munich and Vienna.

== Artistic career ==
McDonnell lives and works in Northern Ireland and New York, but maintains close links with Germany. In 1979, he was the winner of the Darmstädter Kunstpreis and held a Retrospective Exhibition at the Matildenhöhe, Darmstadt, in 1981. His first book, The Ould Orange Flute, was published in 1983. A further Retrospective Exhibition was at the Ulster Museum, Belfast, from 2003 to 2004. The Belfast Telegraph has described McDonnell as "one of Ireland's greatest living artists".

== Personal life ==
In 1969 McDonell married Catherine Elizabeth, a daughter of Ronald Chapman, and had a daughter, born in 1971, and a son born the next year, before they divorced in 1974. He also has a daughter by Wendy Lindbergh, born in 2000. In 2019 he was living at the Old Rectory, Glenarm.

McDonnell is an uncle of the 10th Earl of Antrim and of the artist Flora McDonnell.

== Publications ==
- The Ould Orange Flute (Blackstaff Press, 1983)
- The Night before Larry was Stretched (Blackstaff Press, 1984)
- A Chinese Journey (1986, edited by Anna Pao-Sohmen, illustrated by Hector McDonnell)
- A Journey to Tsaparang (A Journey to Tsaparang (Gschwendtner Blätter, 1990)
- Fools Rush in: A Call to Christian Clowning (1993, with Roly Bain)
- Hector McDonnell, (1993) "Agnews and O'Gnimhs", Journal of The Glens of Antrim Historical Society, Vol 21, pp 13-53.
- The Wild Geese of the Antrim MacDonnells (Irish Academic Press, 1996)
- A Rwandan Journey - Sept-Oct 1996 (1996)
- Diction Aires & French Letters (2000, with Elisabeth Wise)
- A History of Dunluce (2004)
- Irish Round Towers (Wooden Books, 2005, ISBN 978-1-90426-331-9)
- St Patrick: his life and legend (2007)
- Ireland's Other Poetry: Anonymous to Zozimus (The Lilliput Press, 2007, with John Wyse Jackson,ISBN 978-1-84351-122-9)
- Holy Hills and Pagan Places of Ireland (2008)
- Dublin's Other Poetry: Rhymes and Songs of the City (The Lilliput Press, 2009, with John Wyse Jackson)
- Ulster's Other Poetry: Verses and Songs of the Province (The Lilliput Press, 2009, with John Wyse Jackson)
- Ireland's Other History (2015)

== Bibliography ==
- Hector McDONNELL ARUA (Solomon Gallery, exhibition catalogue, 2008)
