= Eddlethorpe =

Hamlet in North Yorkshire, England

Coordinates: 54.090862°N 0.811367°W

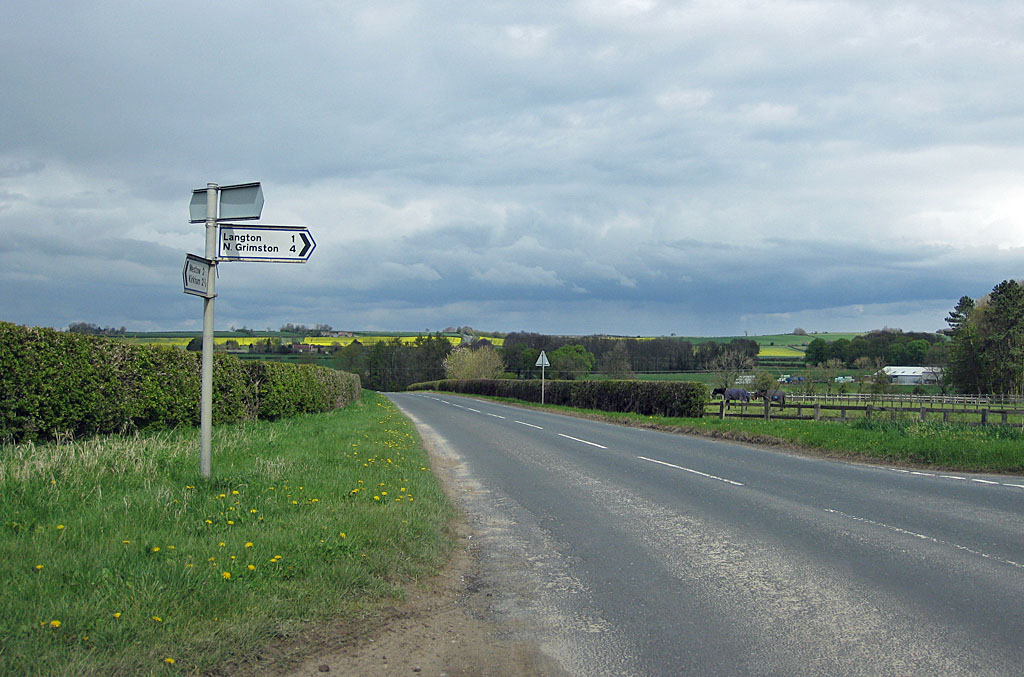

- Location within North Yorkshire
- OS grid reference: SE778667
  - London: 175 mi (282 km) S
- Civil parish: Burythorpe
- Unitary authority: North Yorkshire
- Ceremonial county: North Yorkshire
- Region: Yorkshire and the Humber
- Country: England
- Sovereign state: United Kingdom
- Post town: MALTON
- Postcode district: YO17
- Dialling code: 01656
- Police: North Yorkshire
- Fire: North Yorkshire
- Ambulance: Yorkshire
- UK Parliament: Thirsk and Malton

Eddlethorpe is a hamlet in the civil parish of Burythorpe, in North Yorkshire, England. It is approximately 4 miles (6 km) south from Malton, and between the village of Langton to the east, and Westow to the south-west.

Until 1974 the hamlet was part of the East Riding of Yorkshire. From 1974 to 2023 it was part of the district of Ryedale, it is now administered by the unitary North Yorkshire Council.

The name Eddlethorpe probably derives from the Old English personal name Eadwald and the Old Norse þorp meaning 'secondary settlement'.

In 1823 Eddlethorpe (then Eddlethorp), was in the civil parish of Westow, and the Wapentake of Buckrose in the East Riding of Yorkshire. Population at the time was 62, with occupations including two farmers, one of whom was the Surveyor of Highways.

Eddlethorpe was formerly a township in the parish of Westow, in 1866 Eddlethorpe became a separate civil parish, on 1 April 1935 the parish was abolished and merged with Burythorpe. In 1931 the parish had a population of 38.

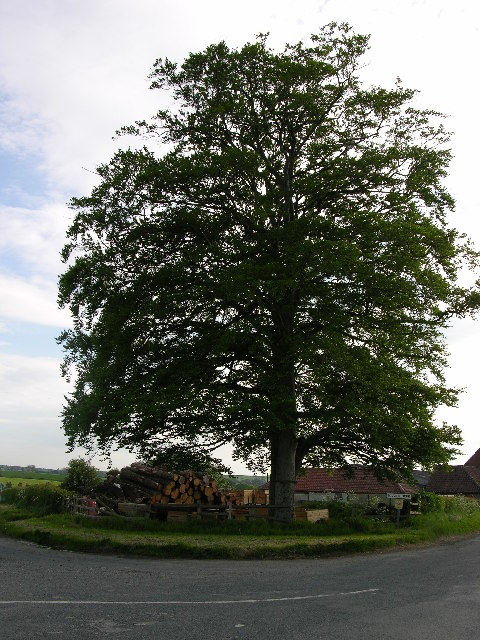
Tree and woodpile 0.5 miles (1 km) south from Eddlethorpe
