= Carnlough =

Village in County Antrim, Northern Ireland

Coordinates: 54.99°N 5.99°W

Carnlough: Irish: Carnlach; Scots: Carnloch
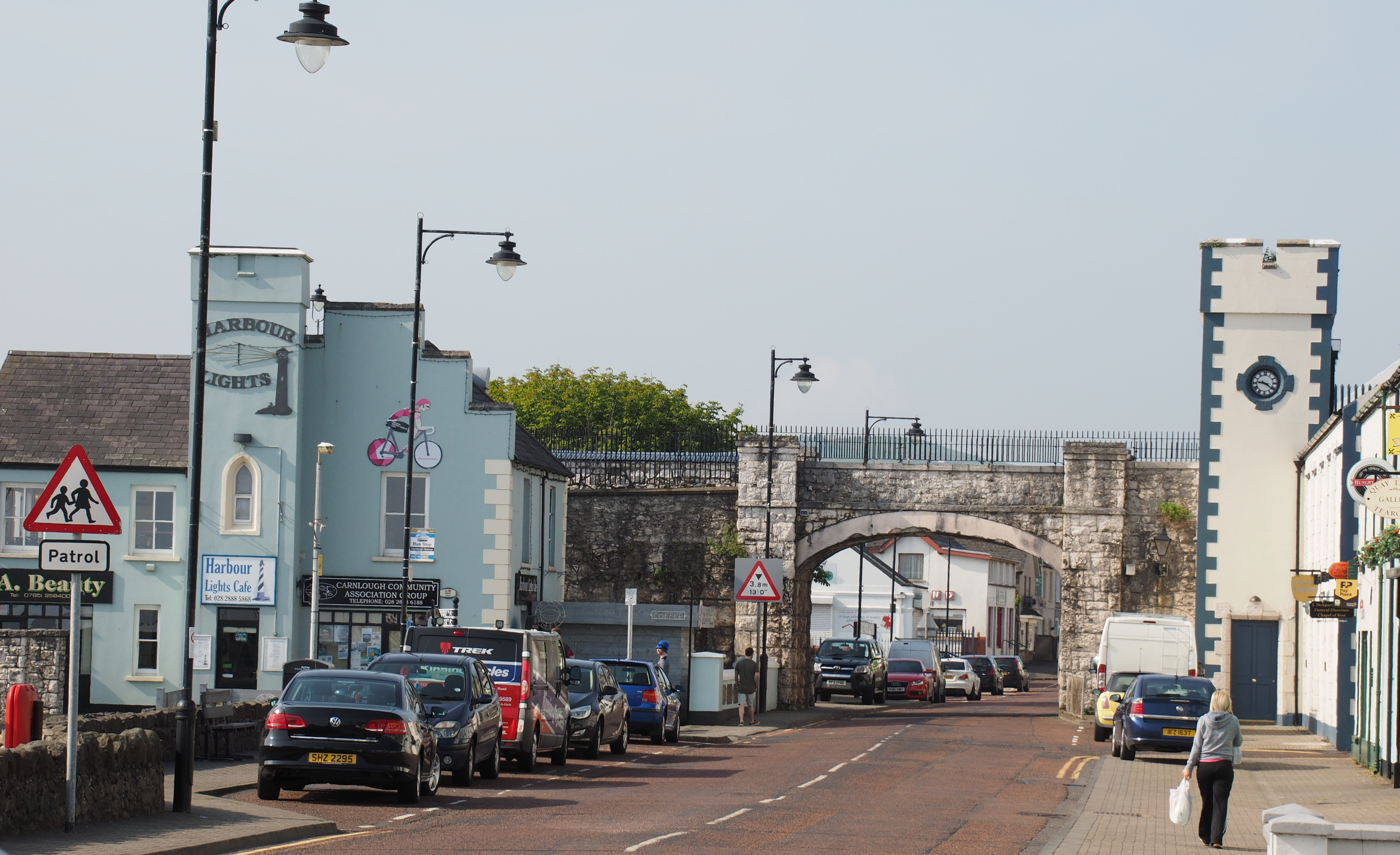
- Harbour Road, Carnlough

- Location within Northern Ireland
- Population: 1,512 (2011 Census)
- Irish grid reference: D2818
  - Belfast: 27 mi (43 km)
  - Dublin: 114 mi (183 km)
- District: Mid and East Antrim
- County: County Antrim
- Country: Northern Ireland
- Sovereign state: United Kingdom
- Post town: BALLYMENA
- Postcode district: BT44
- Dialling code: 028
- UK Parliament: East Antrim
- NI Assembly: East Antrim

Carnlough (/kɑːrnˈlɒx/ karn-LOKH; from Irish Carnlach 'place of cairns') is a village in County Antrim, Northern Ireland. It is situated in Mid and East Antrim district, as well the historic barony of Glenarm Lower, and the civil parishes of Ardclinis and Tickmacrevan. The village is on the Antrim coast, 14 miles (23 km) north-east of Ballymena. It had a population of 1,512 people at the 2011 census.

== History ==
=== Built heritage ===
Carnlough's harbour was built by the owners of the quarries west of the village, as was a freight tramway between the quarries and the harbour, including two bridges, both extent, for two parallel streets in the village.

The Londonderry Arms Hotel, now known as the Harbourview Hotel, was built in 1848 as a coaching inn by Frances Anne Vane Tempest, Marchioness of Londonderry, great-grandmother of Winston Churchill.

=== 20th century ===
On 21 August 1942, a Royal Air Force Consolidated Liberator Mk. III (LV340) of No. 120 Squadron on a test flight from RAF Nutts Corner, Northern Ireland crashed into Big Trosk Mountain near Carnlough in heavy mist with the loss of all eight aboard, including Harry King Goode, a First World War flying ace.

In June 1980, Irish Independence Party member and Larne Borough Council councillor John Turnley was murdered by the Ulster Defence Association as he drove to attend a political meeting on the Marine Road. In April 1987, loyalist bandsman and UDA member Andrew Mason was beaten to death by two local men who were subsequently jailed for the killing.

== Education ==
There are three main educational institutions in the area. These are: St. John's Primary School, St Killian's College, and Carnlough Controlled Integrated Primary School. The latter was known as Carnlough Primary School up until 2004 - but as the non Roman Catholic population began to dwindle, numbers fell at the school. A primary school in nearby Glenarm has since closed and the two schools have now merged into one integrated school.

== Sport ==
=== Football ===
There were two IFA junior football teams based in the village. They were Carnlough United and Glencloy Swifts.

Carnlough United was founded in 1964 and started off in the now defunct Larne and District Junior League. In 1994, the club joined the Ballymena Saturday Morning League. At the beginning of season 2007–2008, Carnlough United entered the Junior Division 2 section of the Ballymena and Provincial League.

Glencloy Swifts was established in 1994 and following one season in the Larne and District League, the club entered Division 3 of the Ballymena Saturday Morning League. Glencloy Swifts secured their first trophy in 2003 when they won the Crawford Cup.

In 2009, Carnlough United and Glencloy Swifts merged to become Carnlough Swifts. Carnlough Swifts play in the first division of the Ballymena Saturday Morning League. The club's reserve team play in the Ballymena & Provincial League Junior Division 3

Glens United FC a junior Grassroots club was established in 2018 with 12 children from the village, the club now has over 170 children with 9 teams, Playing each week in the SBYL league and the Lisburn League. The Club was voted IFA McDonalds IFA National Junior Club of the year 2023/24 and has enjoyed fanatic growth from forming in the Glens of Antrim Village.

Carnlough native Brendan Rodgers is the former manager of Scottish Premiership side Celtic FC, a former Northern Ireland schoolboy international and manager of Chelsea reserves, and the former manager of Liverpool and Leicester City.

=== Gig rowing ===
Four-oared gig racing has a measure of popularity in Carnlough. Up until recently, craft for this sport were the product of local boat builders and during the summer crews may be seen training out on the bay. An annual regatta which takes place in May and attracts who take part in the Round the Rock Challenge.

The local rowing club is Carnlough Rowing Club, which has over 100 members and is part of the Irish Coastal Rowing Federation. The club's ladies section competed at the 2007 All Ireland Championships which were held at Union Hall, County Cork. In 2008, the Veteran Ladies won a bronze at the All Irelands which was held in Cairndhu. 2009's All Ireland a combined crew of Glenarm and Carnlough won a silver in the Veteran Men. The club was featured on the BBC documentary programme Coast.

=== Camogie ===
Carnlough are represented in the Antrim Camogie Association by the St John's club, where they are represented at U12 and U16 level. From March 2008 St. John's started a senior camogie team who contest in the 3rd Division of the all-county league.

== Politics ==
Carnlough lies within the Carnlough electoral ward of Mid and East Antrim Borough Council's Coast Road District electoral division. Of the five electoral wards which make up the Coast Road district electoral area Carnlough is the only ward with a Nationalist majority and the only majority Nationalist ward in the whole of the former Larne Borough Council area. Sinn Féin have seen their vote increase in the area and opened a constituency office in Carnlough in 2012.

The twelfth of July celebrations are held in the village every seven years. In 2007, a residents' group protested against both the parade and a Royal Black Preceptory parade.

== Demography ==
Carnlough is classified as a village by the Northern Ireland Statistics and Research Agency (NISRA) (i.e. with a population between 1,000 and 2,499 people). On Census day (27 March 2011) there were 1,512 people living in Carnlough. Of these:

- 22.62% were aged under 16 years and 14.68% were aged 65 and over
- 47.69% of the population were male and 52.31% were female
- 83.86% were from a Catholic background and 14.22% were from a Protestant background

== Notable people ==
- George Shiels (1881–1949), dramatist
- Declan O'Loan (born 1951), former Member of the Northern Ireland Assembly (MLA) for North Antrim]
- Brendan Rodgers (born 1973), professional football manager and former player

== Gallery ==
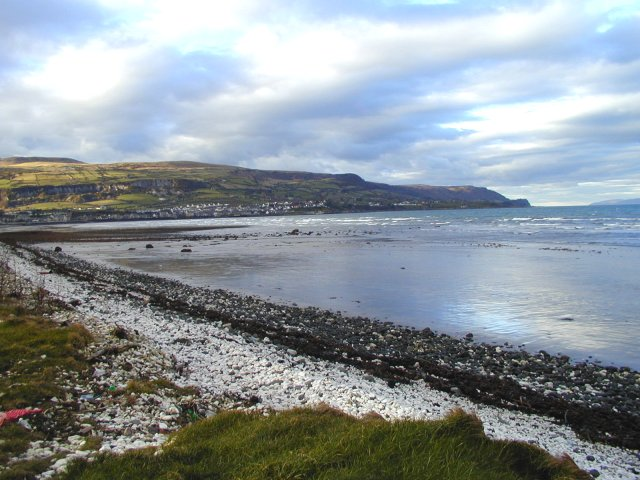
Carnlough Bay

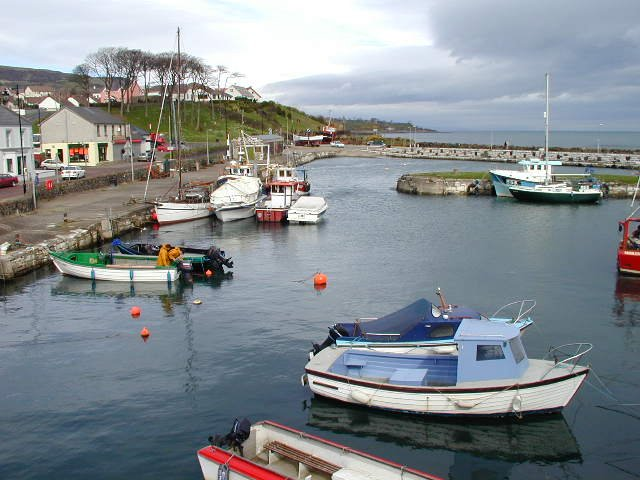
Carnlough Harbour

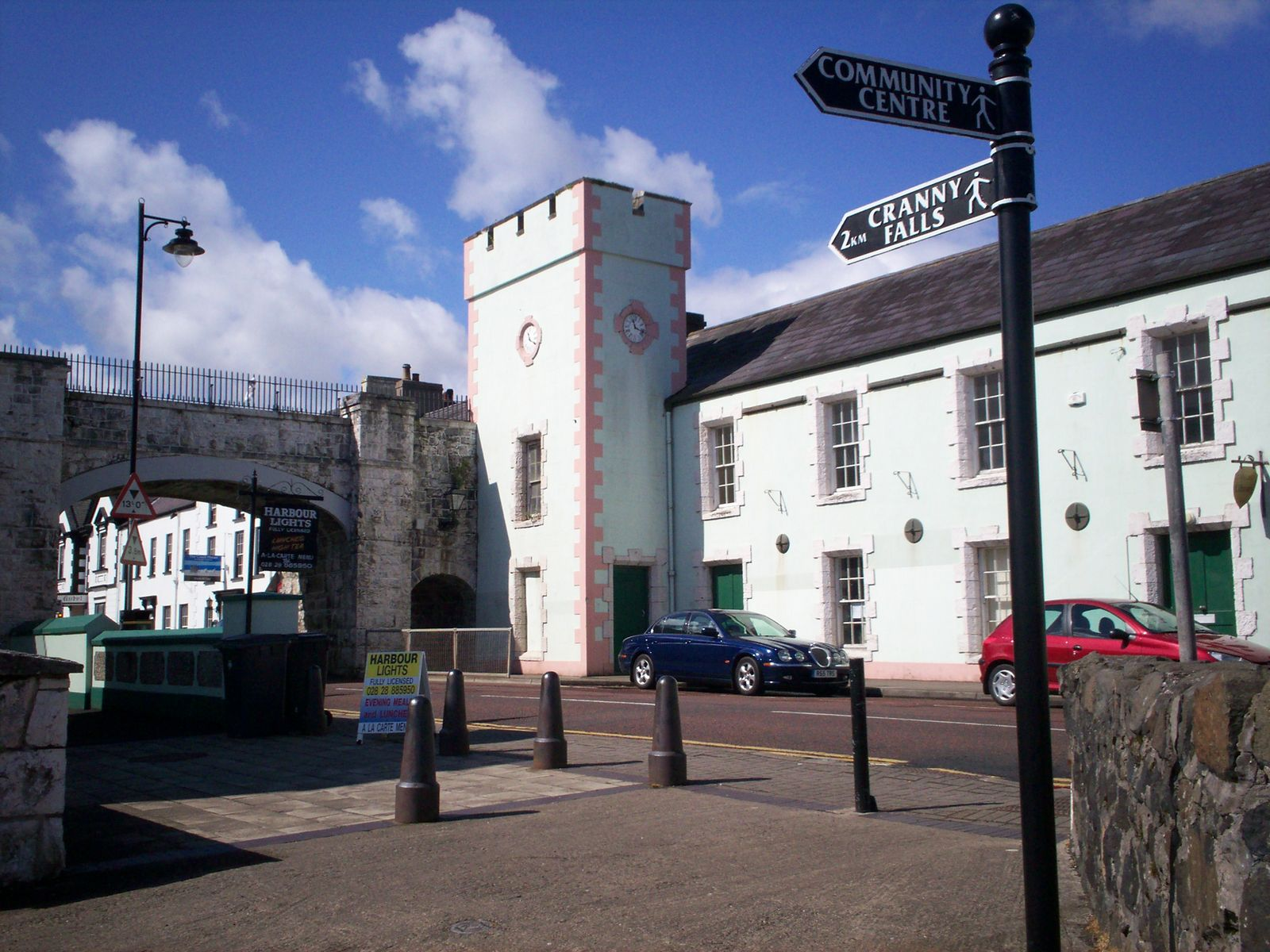
Harbour Road

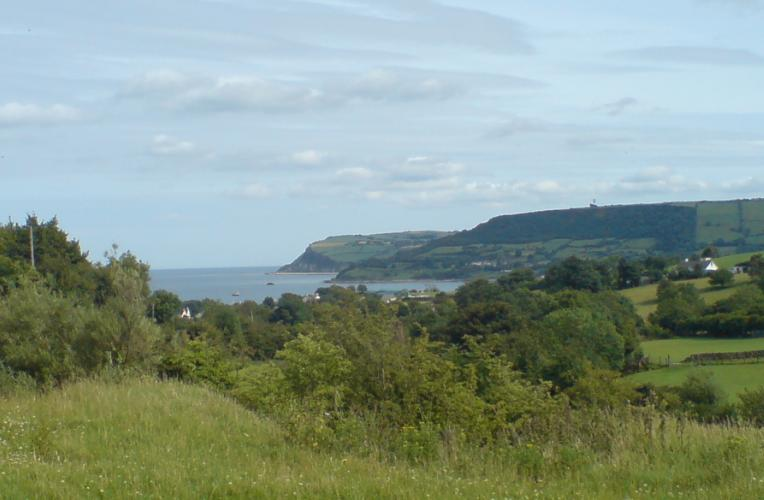
View of the Antrim Glens from Carnlough

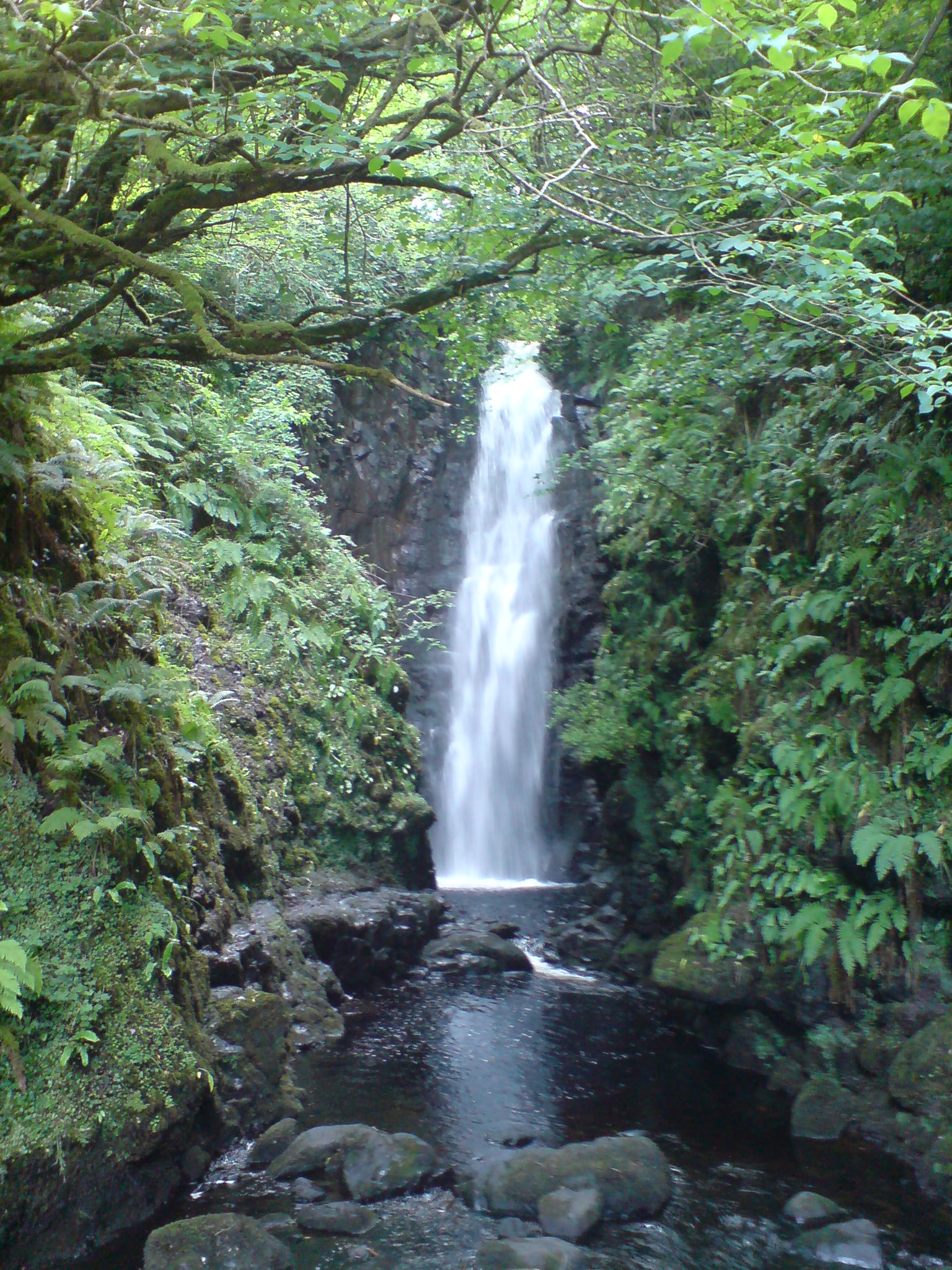
Cranny Falls

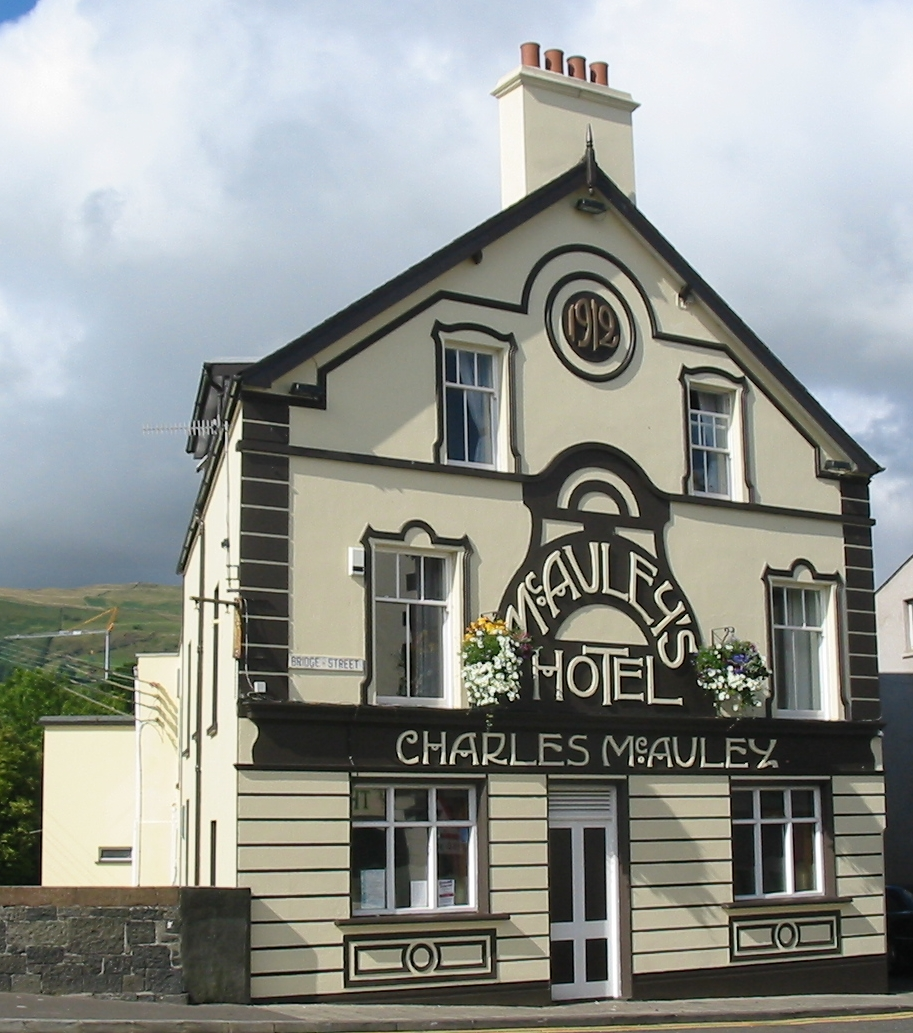
Local hotel with Art Nouveau decoration
