= Dalriada Festival =

Annual cultural festival in Glenarm, Northern Ireland

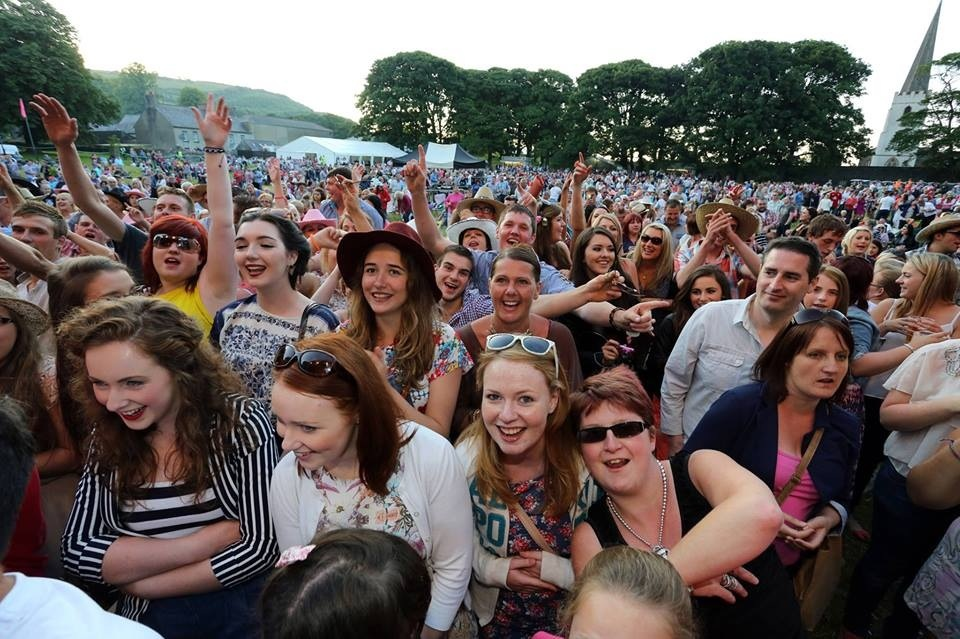
Dalriada Festival 2013 crowd shot

The Dalriada Festival, later known as Dalfest, is an annual cultural and heritage festival of sport, music and foods that has previously taken place, during July, in the village of Glenarm in Northern Ireland.

== Overview ==
The main events of the festival have taken place at Glenarm Castle since 2011. Since its establishment, the event has grown to include Highland games, other sports, food stalls and demonstrations, dance and "displays of living history".

As part of the festival, Glenarm Castle also hosts outdoor concerts known as "DalriadaLIVE". Artists who have appeared at DalriadaLIVE include General Fiasco, Duke Special, The Priests, David Phelps, Ronan Keating, Sharon Corr, Nathan Carter and Lisa McHugh. Glenarm village and the local area provides the location for the sporting events such as a triathlon, rowing regatta and horse hunt chase. The village also hosts community based events including a wife-carrying competition, a treasure hunt, fun run and a foraging walk. The festival week traditionally comes to end with a street carnival, live music and a fireworks finale.

The festival, which previously attracted between 20,000 and 30,000 attendees, was cancelled in 2020 due to the COVID-19 pandemic. However, a 'Homefest' event was held in 2020 where artists performed "virtually" via a livestream broadcast.

In 2021, the festival was repackaged as 'Dalfest' and was held as a live event with social distancing regulations in place. Artists included The Undertones, Pixie Lott and Ella Henderson. Performers at the 2022 event included Tom Odell, Melanie C, Roman Kemp, Paddy Raff and Dea Matrona. The 2023 festival, held between 15–16 July 2023, included performances by The Vamps and KT Tunstall.

In February 2024, it was announced that the July 2024 event would be cancelled due to "poor weather" the previous year. It was cancelled again in 2025.
