= Glenarm Castle =

Country house in Glenarm, County Antrim, Northern Ireland

- Glenarm, County Antrim, Northern Ireland
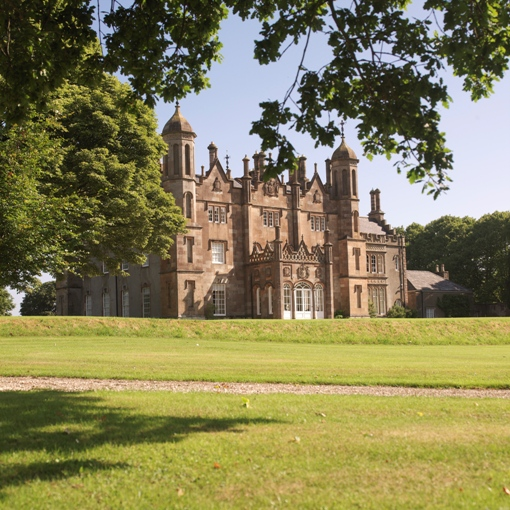
- Glenarm Castle

Site information
- Type: Country estate
- Owner: Randal, Viscount Dunluce
- Controlled by: Northern Irish Environment Agency
- Open to the public: yes
- Website: www.GlenarmCastle.com

Location
- Coordinates: 54.966°N 5.956°W

Site history
- Built: 1636

Glenarm Castle, Glenarm, County Antrim, Northern Ireland, is the ancestral home of the Earl of Antrim.

== History ==
There has been a castle at Glenarm since the 13th century, where it resides at the heart of one of Northern Ireland's oldest estates. It was owned by John Bisset who acquired lands between Larne and Ballycastle from Hugh de Lacy, the Earl of Ulster. Bisset made Glenarm his capital, and by 1260 there was a castle, which stood at the centre of the present village, with a kitchen garden, an orchard and a mill, as well as woods and meadows. The old village courthouse still incorporates some of its walls, indeed an immured skeleton was discovered there in the 1970s. In 1495 Con O'Donnell of Tirconnell marched on ‘MacEoin of the Glens’ (as the Bisset chieftain was called), ‘for he had been told that MacEoin had the finest wife, steed and hound in his neighbourhood. O'Donnell had sent messengers for the steed but was refused it so he made no delay, but surmounting the difficulties of every passage he arrived at night at MacEoin's house without giving any warning of his designs. He captured MacEoin and made himself master of his wife his steed and his hound'. The last MacEoin Bisset was killed fighting the O'Donnells in 1522. Their lands were then seized by the MacDonnells, their former partners, who occupied the Bisset's castle until they built the new one.

The present castle was built by Sir Randal MacDonnell, 1st Earl of Antrim, in 1636, and it has remained in the family since its construction. It is currently owned by Randal McDonnell, 10th Earl of Antrim. The McDonnells have been in Glenarm for nearly 600 years and the estate has been in the family for 400 years.

== Events ==
The castle's walled garden is open to the public between May and September and hosts a number of events. In July of every year, the grounds are the site of a Highland games event. The Dalriada Festival is also held at Glenarm Castle and within the local village. The castle also hosts traditional Ulster Scots cultural events. As part of the Dalriada Festival, Glenarm Castle has started to host outdoor concerts and, in 2012, it welcomed artists like General Fiasco, The Priests, Duke Special, Ronan Keating, Sharon Corr, and David Phelps.

Summer Madness, Ireland's biggest Christian Festival, moved from its annual residence at the Kings Hall, Belfast, to Glenarm Castle in 2012.

== Film location ==
Glenarm Castle was used as a major location in Five Minutes of Heaven. The grounds of Glenarm Castle Estate were used as the location of the Ashford Meadows tourney in season 1 of A Knight of the Seven Kingdoms (TV Series).
