= List of United Kingdom MPs: O =

Following is an incomplete list of past and present Members of Parliament (MPs) of the United Kingdom whose surnames begin with O. The dates in parentheses are the periods for which they were MPs.

- Francis O'Beirne
- Sir Bill O'Brien (1983–2005)
- Cornelius O'Brien
- Sir Edward O'Brien, 4th Baronet
- J. F. X. O'Brien
- James O'Brien
- John O'Brien
- Lucius O'Brien, 13th Baron Inchiquin
- Mike O'Brien (1992–2010)
- Patrick O'Brien
- Stephen O'Brien (1999–2015)
- William O'Brien
- William Smith O'Brien
- Charles O'Connell
- Daniel O'Connell
- Daniel O'Connell Jnr
- John O'Connell
- Maurice O'Connell
- Art O'Connor
- Arthur O'Connor
- Feargus O'Connor
- John O'Connor
- John O'Connor
- Morgan John O'Connell
- T. P. O'Connor (1880–1929)
- James Edward O'Doherty
- Joseph O'Doherty
- Philip O'Doherty
- William O'Doherty
- Charles James O'Donnell (1906–1910)
- John O'Donnell
- Frank Hugh O'Donnell
- Thomas O'Donnell
- Daniel O'Donoghue
- Anthony O'Flaherty
- Patrick O'Keeffe
- Conor O'Kelly
- John J. O'Kelly
- Seán T. O'Kelly
- Thomas O'Hagan, 1st Baron O'Hagan
- Thomas O'Hanlon
- Edward O'Hara (1990–2010)
- Patrick O'Hea
- Brian O'Higgins
- Pádraic Ó Máille
- Seán O'Mahony
- William O'Malley
- James O'Mara
- Arthur O'Neill
- Charles O'Neill
- Edward O'Neill, 2nd Baron O'Neill
- Hugh O'Neill, 1st Baron Rathcavan
- John O'Neill, 3rd Viscount O'Neill
- Martin O'Neill, Baron O'Neill of Clackmannan (1979–2005)
- Robert Torrens O'Neill
- Daniel O'Leary
- William Hagarty O'Leary
- Bryan O'Loghlen
- Colman O'Loghlen
- Myles O'Reilly
- William O'Reilly
- William O'Shea
- Patrick O'Shaughnessy
- Richard O'Shaughnessy
- Eugene O'Sullivan
- Timothy O'Sullivan
- William Henry O'Sullivan OA
- Gordon Oakes (1964–1997)
- Mark Oaten (1997–2010) OD
- William Odell
- OG
- George Ogle OL
- William Oldfield (1942–1955)
- Laurence Oliphant (1865–1869)
- Charles Silver Oliver
- Bill Olner (1992–2010)
- Sarah Olney (2016–2017) ON
- Richard Onslow, 1st Baron Onslow (1679–1715)
- Chi Onwurah (2010–present) OP
- Lembit Öpik (1997–2010)
- Sally Oppenheim-Barnes, Baroness Oppenheim-Barnes (1970–1987) OR
- Diana Organ (1997–2005)
- Sir Charles Ormsby, 1st Baronet
- David Ormsby-Gore, 5th Baron Harlech (1950–1961)
- William Ormsby-Gore
- William Ormsby-Gore, 4th Baron Harlech (1910–1938)
- William Ormsby-Gore, 2nd Baron Harlech (1841–1852), (1858–1876) OS
- George Osborne (2001–present)
- Sandra Osborne (1997–present) OT
- Sir Richard Ottaway (1983–1987), (1992–2015)
- Sir Arthur Otway OW
- Albert Owen (2001–present)
- David Owen (1966–1992)
- Idris Owen (1970–1974)
