= O'Doherty =

O'Doherty (Irish: Ó Dochartaigh) is an Irish surname, which is derived from the O'Doherty clan.

== List of people with the surname ==
- Brian O'Doherty (born 1928), Irish art critic, writer, artist, and academic
- Sir Cahir O'Doherty (1587–1608), last Gaelic Lord of Inishowen in Ireland
- Chris O'Doherty (born 1951), known as Reg Mombassa, New Zealand-born artist and musician
- Claudia O'Doherty (born 1983), Australian actress and comedian
- David O'Doherty (born 1975), Irish stand-up comedian
- Éamonn O'Doherty (republican) (1939–1999), Irish republican and author
- Éamonn O'Doherty (sculptor) (1939–2011), Irish sculptor and painter
- Ellen O'Doherty (religious) (1894-1983), Australian superior general of Sisters of Charity
- Gemma O'Doherty, Irish investigative journalist
- Hugh O'Doherty (died 1924), Irish nationalist politician
- Ian O'Doherty, Irish columnist
- James Edward O'Doherty (1848–1932), Irish lawyer and politician
- Jarrod O'Doherty, rugby league footballer
- Jim O'Doherty, American television producer, writer and actor
- Joseph O'Doherty (1891–1979), Irish politician
- Ken O'Doherty (born 1963), former professional footballer
- Kevin Izod O'Doherty (1823–1905), Irish-Australian politician
- Louie O'Doherty (born 2000), English boxer
- Malachi O'Doherty (born 1951), Irish journalist, author and broadcaster
- Martin O'Doherty (born 1952), retired hurler
- Mary Eva O'Doherty (1826–1910), married name of Mary Eva Kelly, Irish-Australian poet and writer
- Mary-Jean O'Doherty, American-born coloratura soprano
- Maurice O'Doherty (1932–1998), Irish broadcaster and newsreader
- Michael O'Doherty (publisher), Irish talent judge, newswriter and publisher
- Michael J. O'Doherty (1874–1949), Irish archbishop in Manila, Philippines
- Orla O'Doherty, Irish squash player
- Pat O'Doherty, Australian professional rugby league footballer
- Peter O'Doherty (born 1958), New Zealand and Australian musician
- Philip O'Doherty (1871–1926), MP for North Donegal 1906–1918
- Rosa O'Doherty (1588–1660), birth name of Rosa O'Neill, member of the O'Doherty family
- Stephen O'Doherty (born 1959), Australian politician
- Thomas O'Doherty (1877–1936), Irish bishop of Clonfert and Galway
- Tony O'Doherty (born 1947), Irish footballer and manager

== See also ==
- O'Doherty family
- O'Doherty's Rebellion, a 1608 uprising
- Doherty (surname)
- Doherty (disambiguation)
