= Rose O'Neill (disambiguation) =

Rose O'Neill (1874–1944) was an American cartoonist and writer.

Rose O'Neill may also refer to:

- Rose O'Neill (Irish noblewoman) (fl. 1587–1607), Gaelic Irish noblewoman and queen consort of Tyrconnell
- Rosa O'Neill (born Rosa O'Doherty; died 1660), Gaelic Irish noblewoman

== See also ==
- Rose O'Neal Greenhow (1813–1864), American socialite and Confederate spy
