= Doherty =

Doherty may refer to:

== People ==
- Doherty (surname), including a list of people with the surname
- O'Doherty, including a list of people with the surname
  - O'Doherty family, an Irish clan

== Places ==
- Doherty, Ontario, Canada
- Doherty House, a historic house in Hot Springs, Arkansas, United States
- Doherty Slide, a prominent dissected volcanic rim in Oregon, United States

== Schools ==
- Doherty School, in Cincinnati, Ohio, United States
- Doherty High School, in Colorado Springs, Colorado, United States
- Doherty Memorial High School, in Worcester, Massachusetts, United States

== Other ==
- USS Doherty (DE-14), a US Navy destroyer escort
- Doherty amplifier, a modified class B radio-frequency amplifier

== See also ==
- Dohertya, a genus of moths in the subfamily Arctiinae
- Dohertyorsidis, a genus of longhorn beetles of the subfamily Lamiinae
