= Aodh Eangach =

Prophesied figure High King of Ireland

Aodh Eangach (Aodh who leaves a trail of fire or the pennoned one) was a prophesied High King of Ireland in the middle ages who, it was said, would arise from the 'lonely mountains of Patrick' and dislodge the English from Ireland.

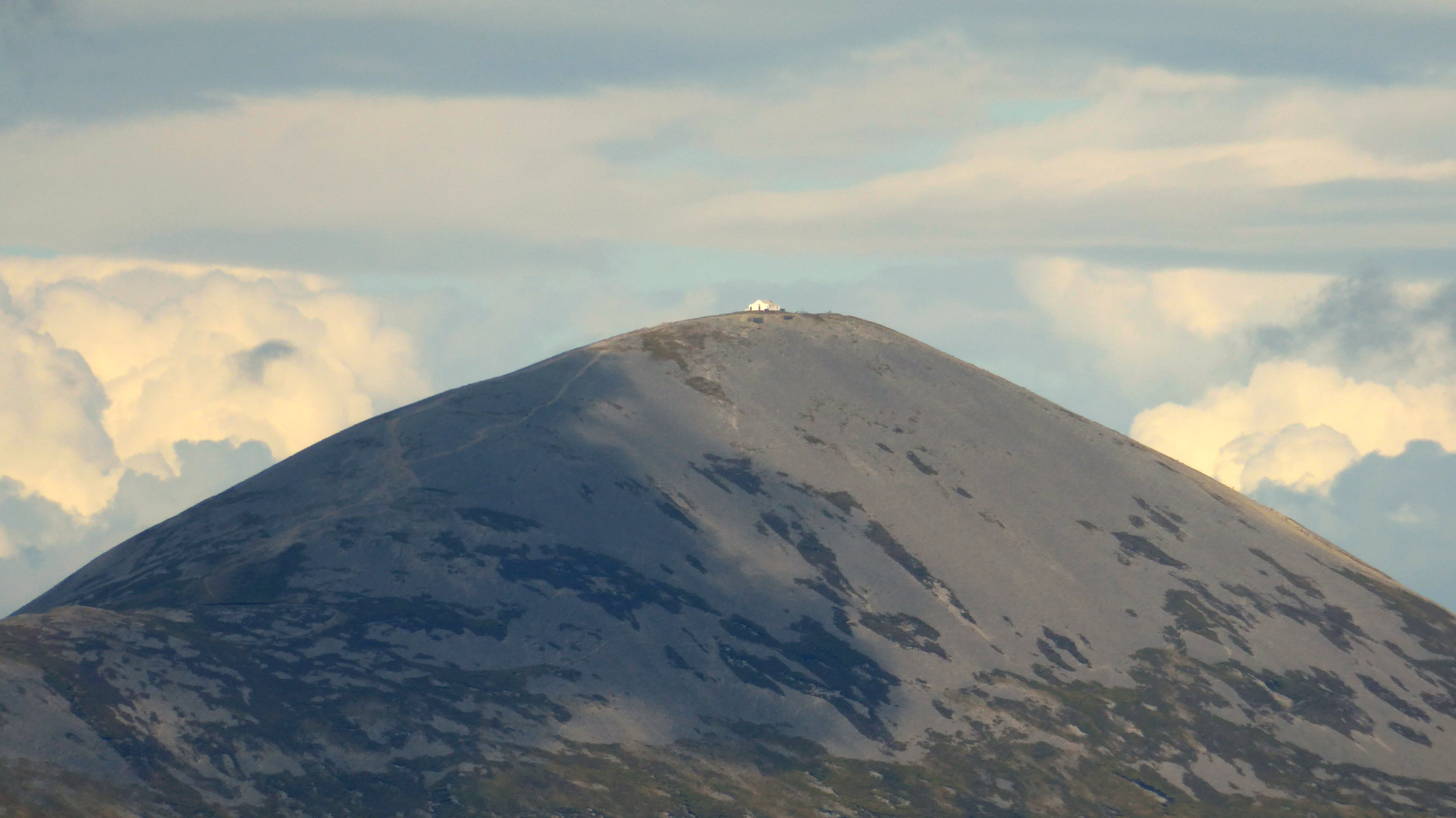
Croagh Patrick, the prophesied mountain where Aodh Eangach would rise out of and descend upon the woods of Ui Fhaelain.

The story seems to have originated in the 'Vision of St. Bearchan' and most references to Aodh's coming frame it in a Christian perspective, such as Giolla Brighde Mac Con Midhe's poem addressed to Aodh O Domhnaill stating explicitly the prophecies origins from Christian saints of Irelands past.

However another source by the mysterious Flann File (Flann the Poet) indicates pagan undertones for Aodh's return, that he would reoccupy the Hill of Tara and restore druidism. This pagan undercurrent to Aodh's foretold banishing of the English from Ireland can be seen against the background of the Anglo-Norman reform of the Irish church, whereby it became an institution dominated in the higher ranks by Englishmen, and the native Irish resistance and resentment to this change.

Various O Conor Kings of Connacht were claimed by their court poets to be the prophesied Aodh including Cathal Crobhdearg Ua Conchobair, his son Aedh Ua Conchobair, and Áed na nGall in an apparent attempt to enhance their prestige and legitimacy. Whether the Kings and their subjects believed these prophecies to be true is debatable, but its clear it held the position of a powerful metaphorical literary motif and showed a desire for a return to a perceived golden age in Ireland that existed before the coming of the Normans to the island.

In 1214 the Annals of Loch Ce make reference to the prophecy when they state ''In this year, moreover, appeared the false Aedh, who was called 'the Aider'(The deliverer).'' The referred to Aedh caused a brief sensation claiming to be the fulfillment of the prophecy and must have had some following who believed his claims for it to be mentioned at all, though the annalist clearly refutes them and no more is heard of this individual.

Hugh Roe O'Donnell (1572–1602) was associated with the prophecy, which was spread by his mother Iníon Dubh. After Hugh Roe died, his nephew Hugh O'Donnell (1605–1625; son of Hugh Roe's brother Cathbarr) was also associated with the prophecy.
