= 1905 North Donegal by-election =

UK Parliamentary by-election

The 1905 North Donegal by-election was a parliamentary by-election held for the United Kingdom House of Commons constituency of North Donegal on 15 June 1905. The vacancy arose because of the death of the sitting member, William O'Doherty of the Irish Parliamentary Party. Only one candidate was nominated, John Muldoon representing the Irish Parliamentary Party, who was elected unopposed.

== Result ==
1905 North Donegal by-election
Party	Candidate	Votes	%	±%
Irish Parliamentary	John Muldoon	Unopposed	N/A	N/A
Irish Parliamentary hold				
