= 1890 North Donegal by-election =

UK Parliamentary by-election

The 1890 North Donegal by-election was a parliamentary by-election held for the United Kingdom House of Commons constituency of North Donegal on 25 June 1890. The vacancy arose because of the resignation of the sitting member, James Edward O'Doherty of the Irish Parliamentary Party. Only one candidate was nominated, James Rochfort Maguire representing the Irish Parliamentary Party, who was elected unopposed.

== Result ==
North Donegal by-election, 1890
Party	Candidate	Votes	%	±%
Irish Parliamentary	James Rochfort Maguire	Unopposed	N/A	N/A
Irish Parliamentary hold				
