= John Eustace Jameson =

Irish politician

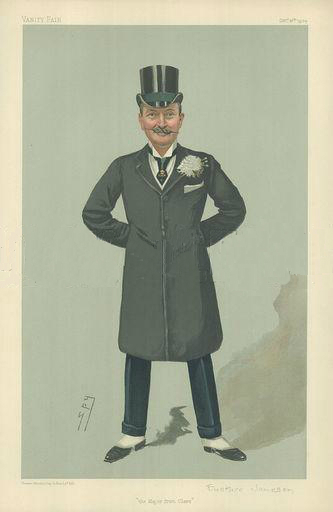
- Vanity Fair caricature by Spy (Leslie Ward), 27 October 1904.
- Born: 22 March 1853; Ireland
- Died: 22 December 1919 (aged 66); Ealing, London
- Known for: Irish soldier in the British Army, distiller and politician
- Spouse: Mary Cabbell

Lieutenant-Colonel John Eustace Jameson (22 March 1853 – 22 December 1919) was an Irish soldier in the British Army, distiller and politician.

Born in Ireland, the son of John Jameson of Anfield, County Dublin, he was educated at Sandhurst. He served in the 18th Regiment of Foot, the 20th Hussars, and the Queen's Own Worcestershire Hussars. In 1914, he raised the 24th (County of London) Battalion (The Queen's), and served in Dublin and Flanders.

He served as HM Inspector of Factories and was managing director of William Jameson distillers, Dublin.

From 1895 until 1906 he served as member of parliament for West Clare. Elected as a member of the Irish Parliamentary Party, he took an independent line in the 1900s and in 1904 he transferred his support to the Irish Unionist Party, which was affiliated to the Conservative Party. He contested the 1906 general election in Chatham, but was defeated by a candidate for the Labour Representation Committee.

He married Mary Cabbell of Cromer, and died in 1919 at his residence in Ealing, London.

Parliament of the United Kingdom
| Preceded by James Rochfort Maguire | Member of Parliament for West Clare; 1895 – 1906 | Succeeded by James Halpin |
