= James Rochfort Maguire =

British politician (1855–1925)

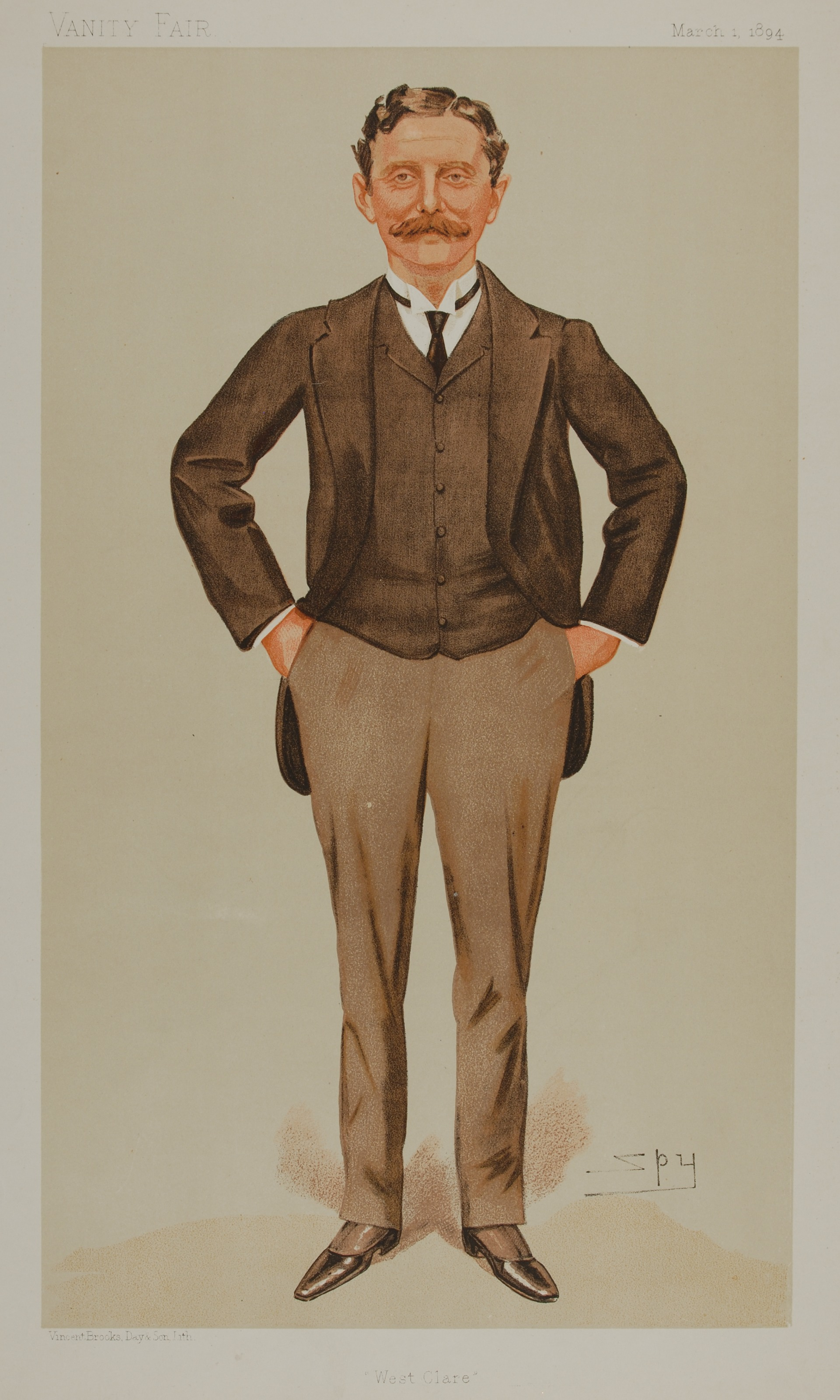
Maguire as caricatured by Spy (Leslie Ward) in Vanity Fair, March 1894

James Rochfort Maguire CBE (4 October 1855 – 18 April 1925) was a British imperialist and Irish Nationalist politician and MP in the House of Commons of the United Kingdom of Great Britain and Ireland. As a member of the Irish Parliamentary Party he represented North Donegal (1890–1892) and as a Parnellite Member he represented West Clare (1892–1895). He was a friend and associate of Cecil Rhodes (1853–1902), and was one of the three men who signed the original concession on which was based the British South Africa Company, of which he was president in 1923–1925.

== Family life and education ==
He was the second son of John Mullock Maguire, rector of Kilkeedy, County Limerick, and his wife Anne Jane née Humphreys. He was educated at Cheltenham College and Merton College, Oxford, where he obtained first classes in mathematics and jurisprudence. He was elected a Fellow of All Souls College, Oxford in 1878 and was called to the bar in 1883, although he never practised the law.

In 1895, in St. George's, Hanover Square, London, he married the Hon. Julia Beatrice Peel, eldest daughter of Viscount Peel, a former Speaker of the House of Commons. In 1913 she laid the Foundation Stone for Bulawayo Railway Station.

== Career ==
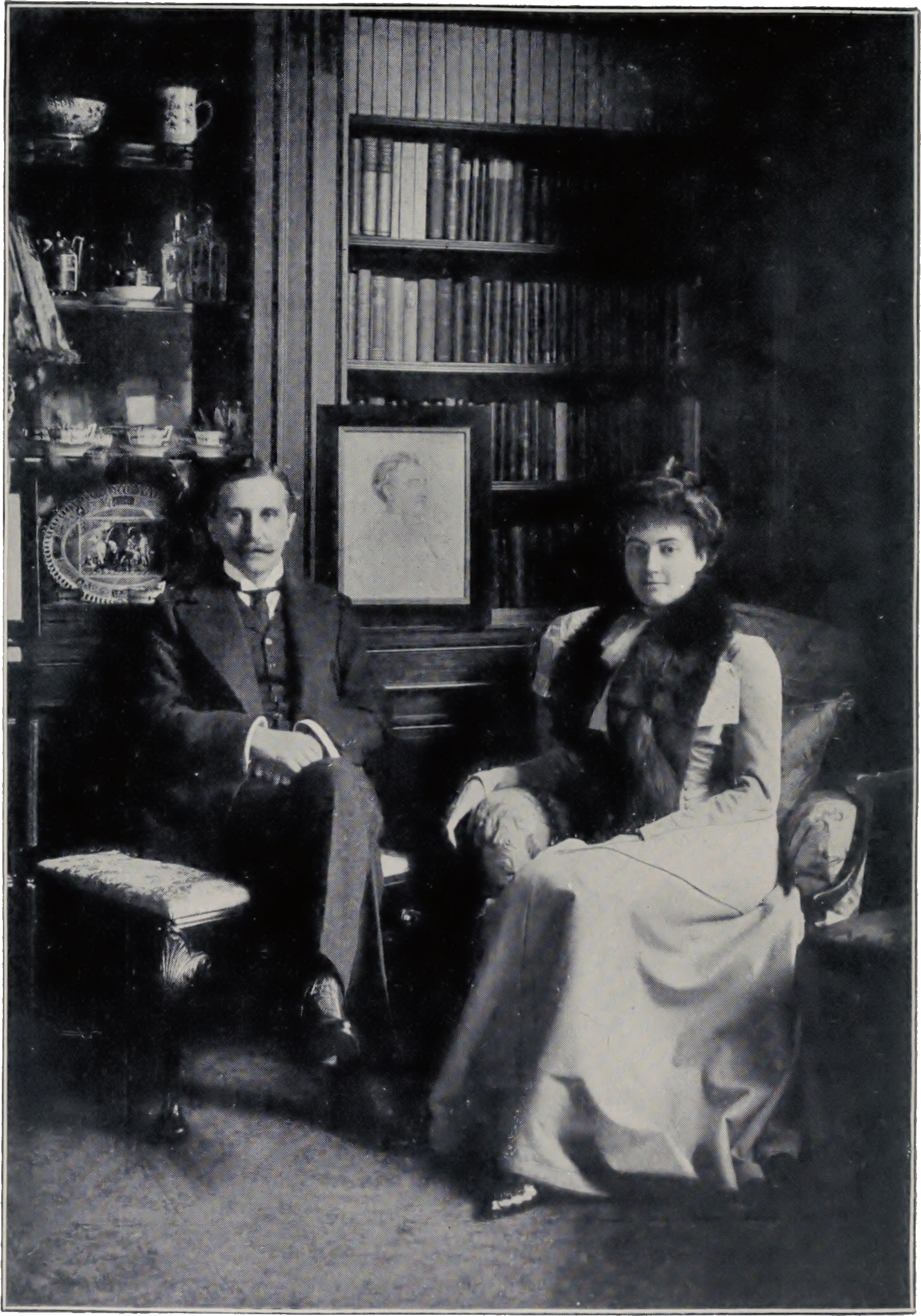
Maguire with his wife

While at Oxford, Maguire became friendly with Cecil Rhodes. In 1888, Rhodes sent him with Charles Rudd and Francis Thompson to negotiate a concession of land and mineral rights in Matabeleland from Chief Lobengula at Bulawayo. This was signed on 30 October. The British South Africa Company was chartered the following October and Maguire was associated with it for the rest of his life.

Meanwhile, in 1888, Rhodes had reached an agreement with Parnell, whom he admired. Rhodes supported Home Rule for Ireland, but saw it as only part of an Imperial federal scheme for the whole British Empire in which all the self-governing territories would send members to the Imperial Parliament. He therefore objected to the terms of Gladstone's unsuccessful Home Rule Bill of 1886, which would have ended Irish representation at Westminster. He gave Parnell £10,000 for the Irish Party's funds in exchange for an undertaking that the Party would promote the continuation of Irish members at Westminster (in the event both later Home Rule Bills, in 1893 and 1912, did provide for this).

Maguire, who shared Rhodes' admiration for Parnell, became the main link between Rhodes and Parnell, and a seat was found for him at an uncontested by-election at North Donegal in June 1890. Less than six months later, however, the Irish Party split over Parnell's leadership. Maguire continued his support for Parnell, and, after Parnell's death in October 1891, for the embattled Parnellites. This meant that he was faced with a real fight at the general election of 1892. Then, he contested West Clare, defeating the Anti-Parnellite candidate convincingly by over 1,000 votes. However, at the following general election in 1895, after the destruction of the second Home Rule Bill by the House of Lords in 1894, Maguire lost the seat to a fresh Anti-Parnellite candidate, by 403 votes.

His later career was almost entirely concerned with South and central Africa. He went through the Siege of Kimberley in the Boer War with Rhodes, accompanied by his wife. After Rhodes' death in 1902, Maguire carried on his work as a businessman, in the British South Africa Company, as a director of the Consolidated Gold Fields of South Africa, and particularly in the development of the Rhodesian railway system of which he was chairman for many years.

He was appointed a Commander of the Order of the British Empire in the 1918 New Year Honours for his efforts during the First World War.

According to The Times, among dozens of friends and associates from his imperial career who attended his funeral on 24 April 1925, there was only one representative of the Irish nationalist movement, namely his former Parnellite colleague John O'Connor.

== Publications ==
- The Pioneers of Empire: Being a Vindication of the Principle and a Short Sketch of the History of Chartered Companies, with Especial Reference to the British South Africa Company, London, Methuen, 1896
- Cecil Rhodes: A Biography and Appreciation by Imperialist; with Personal Reminiscences by Dr. Jameson, London: Chapman & Hall, 1897 (&) Macmillan & Co., 1897 (Colonial Library edition)
- The Case of Ireland: "The Times" proposal. My suggestions, 1919
- "Rhodesia," Journal of the African Society (continued as African Affairs), Vol.22 No.86, January 1923, pp. 81–95

== Sources ==
- Irish Independent, 20 April 1925, pp. 6 and 7
- F. S. L. Lyons, Charles Stewart Parnell, London, Collins, 1977, pp. 442–4, 587–9
- Newbury, Colin (2008) [2004]. "Maguire, James Rochfort (1855–1925)". Oxford Dictionary of National Biography (online ed.). Oxford University Press. doi:10.1093/ref:odnb/34832. (Subscription, Wikipedia Library access or UK public library membership required.)
- The Times, 20 and 23 April 1925
- Brian M. Walker (ed.), Parliamentary Election Results in Ireland, 1801–1922, Dublin, Royal Irish Academy, 1978
- Who Was Who 1916–1928

Parliament of the United Kingdom
Preceded by James Edward O'Doherty	Member of Parliament for North Donegal; 1890–1892	Succeeded by John Mains
Preceded by Jeremiah Jordan	Member of Parliament for West Clare; 1892–1895	Succeeded by John Eustace Jameson
