= Arthur Lynch (politician) =

Australian engineer and writer (1861–1934)

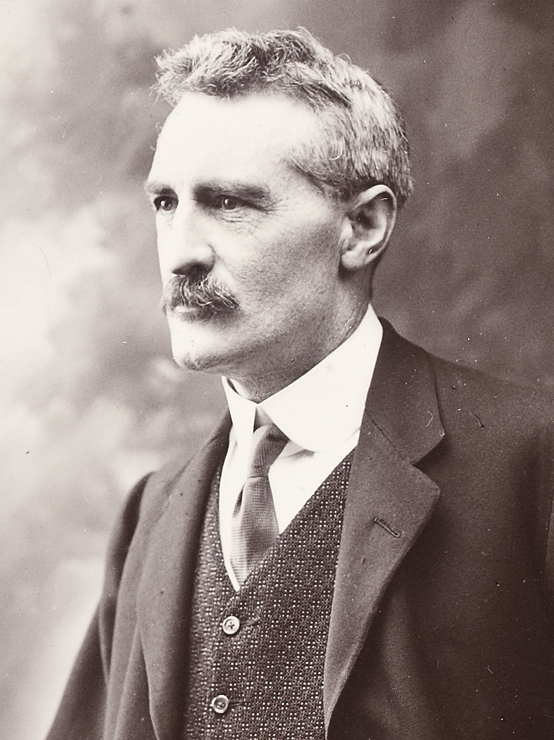

Member of Parliament
- In office 1909 – December 1918
- Preceded by: James Halpin
- Succeeded by: Brian O'Higgins
- Constituency: West Clare
- In office 1901–1903
- Preceded by: Martin Morris, 2nd Baron Killanin
- Succeeded by: Charles Ramsay Devlin
- Constituency: Galway Borough

Personal details
- Born: 16 October 1861 Smythesdale, Colony of Victoria
- Died: 25 March 1934 (aged 72) Haverstock Hill, London, England
- Party: Irish Parliamentary Party

Military service
- Allegiance: Boer Republics
- Unit: Second Irish Brigade
- Battles/wars: Second Boer War

Arthur Alfred Lynch (16 October 1861 – 25 March 1934) was an Irish Australian civil engineer, physician, journalist, author, soldier, anti-imperialist and polymath. He served as MP in the UK House of Commons as member of the Irish Parliamentary Party, representing Galway Borough from 1901 to 1902, and later West Clare from 1909 to 1918. Lynch fought on the Boer side during the Boer War in South Africa, for which he was sentenced to death but later pardoned. He supported the British war effort in the First World War, raising his own Irish battalion in Munster towards the end of the war.

== Australian years ==
Lynch was born at Smythesdale near Ballarat, Victoria, the fourth of 14 children. His father, John Lynch, was an Irish Catholic surveyor and civil engineer and his mother Isabella (née MacGregor) was Scottish. John Lynch was a founder and first president of the Ballarat School of Mines, and a captain of Peter Lalor at the Eureka Stockade rebellion (1854) and John Lynch wrote a book, Austral Light (1893–94), about it – later republished as The Story of the Eureka Stockade.

== Europe and Ireland ==
Lynch left Australia and went to Berlin, where he studied physics, physiology and psychology at the University of Berlin in 1888–1889. He had a particular respect for Hermann von Helmholtz.

Lynch met Annie Powell (daughter of John D. Powell) in Berlin and they were married in 1895. They were to have no children. In Lynch's words, the marriage "never lost its happiness" (My Life Story, p. 85).

== Boer brigade ==
When the Second Boer War broke out, Lynch was sympathetic to the Boers and decided to go to South Africa as a war correspondent. In Pretoria, he met General Louis Botha, and decided to join the Boer side. Lynch raised the Second Irish Brigade, which consisted of peoples opposed to the British. He was given the rank of Colonel and saw limited active service. In his comprehensive history on the Australia's Boer War, Craig Wilcox said, it was misleading to call the 70 or so men in the Irish unit raised by Lynch "a brigade", rather he suggested that "the publicity that comes from spectacular gestures..." made Lynch appear "a romantic warrior" and that his actions "flattered many Irishmen and women...". In contrast, Antony O'Brien's fictional Bye-Bye Dolly Gray, is kinder to Lynch's showy South African exploits and his uitlanders. Michael Davitt who travelled to South Africa has photos of Lynch with his brigade on the veldt in The Boer Fight for Freedom.

== Conviction and pardon ==
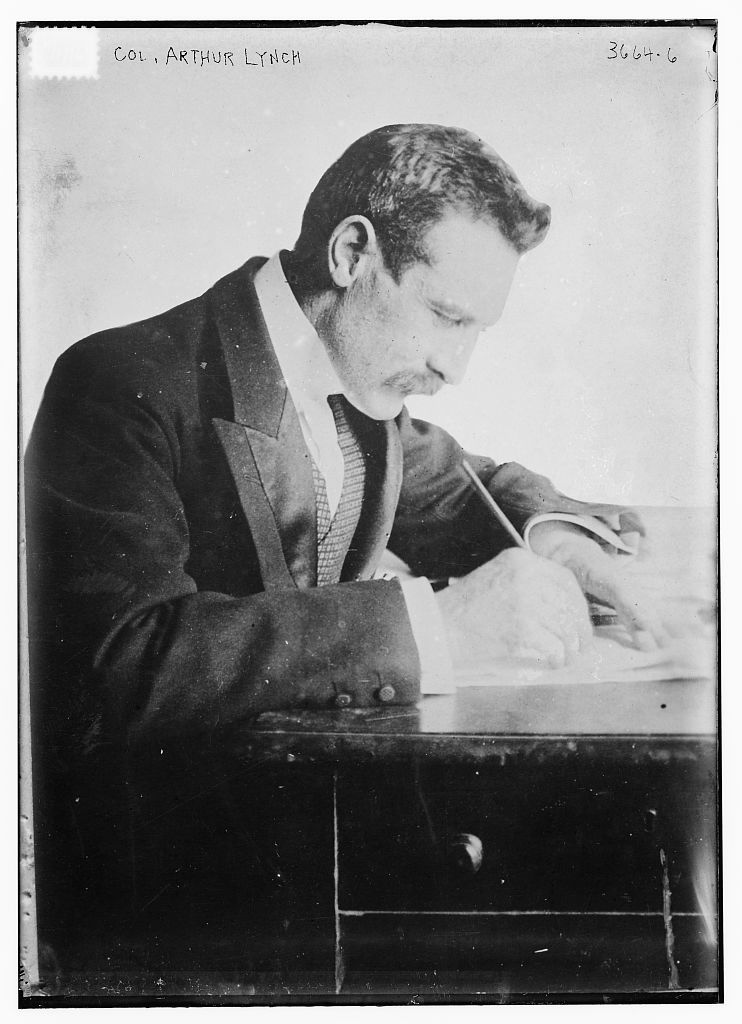
Lynch in 1915

After South Africa, Lynch travelled to the United States, and then returned to Paris, from where he again stood for Galway Borough in November 1901 and was elected in his absence as MP. On going to London, Lynch was arrested for his pro-Boer activities and on remand for eight months.

In July 1907, Lynch was pardoned, and in 1909 he was again elected Member of Parliament, this time for West Clare, in Ireland.

== Munster battalion ==
During World War I, Lynch volunteered for the New British Army. He raised a private 10th Battalion, Royal Munster Fusiliers and was given the rank of colonel, although he and his unit never saw active front service. At the end of the war, Lynch chose to stand as a Labour candidate in newly created Battersea South for the 1918 General election. He finished second to the Conservative candidate.

== Publications ==
Lynch wrote many publications including:

- Modern Authors (1891)
- Approaches the Poor Scholar's Quest of a Mecca (1892)
- A Koran of Love (1894)
- Our Poets (1894)
- Religio Athletae (1895)
- Human Documents (1896)
- Prince Azreel (1911)
- Psychology; A New System (two vol.; 1912)
- Purpose and Evolution (1913)
- Sonnets of the Banner and the Star (1914)
- Ireland: Vital Hour (1915)
- Poppy Meadows, Roman Philosophique (1915)
- La Nouvelle Ethique (1917)
- L'Evolution dons ses Rapports avec l'ethique (1917)
- Moments of Genius (1919)
- The Immortal Caravel (1920)
- Moods of Life (1921)
- O'Rourke the Great (1921)
- Ethics, an Exposition of Principles (1922)
- Principles of Psychology (1923)
- Seraph Wings (1923)
- My Life Story (1924)
- Science, Leading and Misleading (1927)
- The Rosy Fingers (1929)
- The Case Against Einstein (1932)

== Popular culture ==
- Antony O'Brien, Bye-Bye Dolly Gray, Artillery Publishing, Hartwell, 2006. (a novel includes several sympathetic scenes involving Lynch's exploits on the Colenso, Johannesburg and Transvaal front during 1899 and 1900)

== At the Boer War ==
- Craig Wilcox. (2002), Australia's Boer War: The War in South Africa, 1899-1902, Oxford. A blunt appraisal of A.A's action in the war
- Michael Davitt. (1902) The Boer Fight For Freedom: From the Beginning of Hostilities to the Peace of Pretoria, Funk & Wagnalls, New York, 3rd ed.

Parliament of the United Kingdom
Preceded by Martin Morris	Member of Parliament for Galway Borough; 1901–1903	Succeeded by Charles Ramsay Devlin
Preceded by James Halpin	Member of Parliament for West Clare; 1909–1918	Succeeded by Brian O'Higgins
