= Thomas Bartholomew Curran =

Thomas Bartholomew Curran (1870 – 1929) was an Irish barrister and an Anti-Parnellite/Irish National Federation politician who served in the United Kingdom House of Commons as Member of Parliament (MP) for the constituencies of Kilkenny City (1892–1895) and North Donegal (1895–1900). He was the son of Thomas Curran, MP for South Sligo from 1892 to 1900 and Mary (Coll) Curran (1847) of Derryfad, Creeslough, County Donegal, Ireland.

Thomas Curran and his son, Thomas Bartholomew, owed their elections to the Irish National Federation to whom Thomas senior made an unsecured loan of £10,000 to fund their campaign in the 1892 general election. According to Tim Healy:

"Thomas Curran, a hotel-keeper in Sydney (New South Wales), came to our rescue by lending £10,000 without security. Although he was repaid, his generosity deserves remembrance. He was a man by no means sentimentally moulded. When I learnt to know him I thought him of the type least likely to make a sacrifice. We put his son (then a law student in London) up for the City of Kilkenny, and himself for Sligo, and both were elected."

Thomas Bartholomew Curran was succeeded as MP for Kilkenny City by Pat O'Brien.

His photographic portrait taken on 22 September 1897 by Sir (John) Benjamin Stone, is in the National Portrait Gallery, London.

It seems he went back to Australia and stood as a Progressive candidate in the constituency of Paddington, New South Wales in the 1904 elections. he was defeated on that occasion, winning 36% of the vote compared to 64% for the incumbent Liberal Party member, Charles William Oakes.

Parliament of the United Kingdom
Preceded by Thomas Quinn	Member of Parliament for Kilkenny City; 1892–1895	Succeeded by Pat O'Brien
Preceded by John Mains	Member of Parliament for North Donegal; 1895–1900	Succeeded by William O'Doherty
Preceded by Frederick Smith	Baby of the House; 1892–1895	Succeeded by William Wentworth-Fitzwilliam
