= North Donegal =

UK parliamentary constituency in Ireland, 1885–1922

- Former county constituency for the House of Commons

1885–1922
- Seats: 1
- Created from: County Donegal
- Replaced by: Donegal

North Donegal was a UK Parliament constituency in Ireland, returning one Member of Parliament from 1885 to 1922.

Prior to the 1885 United Kingdom general election the area was part of the County Donegal constituency. From 1922, on the establishment of the Irish Free State, it was not represented in the UK Parliament.

== Boundaries ==
This constituency comprised the northern part of County Donegal, consisting of the barony of Inishowen East, that part of the barony of Inishowen West not contained within the constituency of East Donegal, and that part of the barony of Kilmacrenan contained within the parishes of Clandavaddog, Killygarvan and Tullyfern and the townlands of Drumherrive, Glenalla and Ray in the parish of Aughnish.

== Members of Parliament ==
Election	Member	Party	Note
1885, December 1	James Edward O'Doherty	Irish Parliamentary	Resigned
1890, June 25	James Rochfort Maguire	Irish Parliamentary	Party split
1890, December ^{1}	James Rochfort Maguire	Irish National League	Re-elected for West Clare
1892, July 12	John Mains	Irish National Federation	
1895, July 15	Thomas Bartholomew Curran	Irish National Federation	
1900, October 8	William O'Doherty	Irish Parliamentary	Died 18 May 1905
1905, June 15	John Muldoon	Irish Parliamentary	
1906, January 16	Philip O'Doherty	Irish Parliamentary	
1918, December 14 ^{2}	Joseph O'Doherty	Sinn Féin	Did not take his seat at Westminster
1922, October 26	UK constituency abolished		

Notes:-

- ^{1} Not an election, but the date of a party change. The Irish Parliamentary Party had been created in 1882, on the initiative of Charles Stewart Parnell's Irish National League. Both the IPP and the INL split into Parnellite and Anti-Parnellite factions, in December 1890. The Parnellites remained members of the Irish National League after the split and the Anti-Parnellites organised the Irish National Federation in March 1891. The two organisations and the United Irish League merged in 1900, to re-create the Irish Parliamentary Party.
- ^{2} Date of polling day. The result was declared on 28 December 1918, to allow time for votes cast by members of the armed forces to be included in the count.

== Elections ==
=== Elections in the 1910s ===
1918 general election: North Donegal
Party	Candidate	Votes	%	±%
Sinn Féin	Joseph O'Doherty	7,003	69.5	New
Irish Parliamentary	Philip O'Doherty	3,075	30.5	N/A
Majority		3,928	39.0	N/A
Turnout		10,078	57.5	N/A
Registered electors		17,538		
Sinn Féin gain from Irish Parliamentary		Swing	N/A	

December 1910 general election: North Donegal
Party	Candidate	Votes	%	±%
Irish Parliamentary	Philip O'Doherty	Unopposed		
Irish Parliamentary hold				

January 1910 general election: North Donegal
Party	Candidate	Votes	%	±%
Irish Parliamentary	Philip O'Doherty	Unopposed		
Irish Parliamentary hold				

=== Elections in the 1900s ===
1906 general election: North Donegal
Party	Candidate	Votes	%	±%
Irish Parliamentary	Philip O'Doherty	Unopposed		
Irish Parliamentary hold				

1905 North Donegal by-election
Party	Candidate	Votes	%	±%
Irish Parliamentary	John Muldoon	Unopposed		
Irish Parliamentary hold				

1900 general election: North Donegal
Party	Candidate	Votes	%	±%
Irish Parliamentary	William O'Doherty	2,562	61.4	N/A
Healyite Nationalist	Arthur O'Connor	1,612	38.6	N/A
Majority		950	22.8	N/A
Turnout		4,174	51.6	N/A
Registered electors		8,095		
Irish Parliamentary hold		Swing	N/A	

=== Elections in the 1890s ===
1895 general election: North Donegal
Party	Candidate	Votes	%	±%
Irish National Federation	Thomas Bartholomew Curran	Unopposed		
Irish National Federation hold				

1892 general election: North Donegal
Party	Candidate	Votes	%	±%
Irish National Federation	John Mains	3,819	77.5	−4.8
Liberal Unionist	David Bartholomew McCorkell	1,108	22.5	+4.8
Majority		2,711	55.0	−9.6
Turnout		4,927	70.7	−4.0
Registered electors		6,965		
Irish National Federation gain from Irish Parliamentary		Swing		

1890 North Donegal by-election
Party	Candidate	Votes	%	±%
Irish Parliamentary	James Rochfort Maguire	Unopposed		
Irish Parliamentary hold				

=== Elections in the 1880s ===
1886 general election: North Donegal
Party	Candidate	Votes	%	±%
Irish Parliamentary	James Edward O'Doherty	4,263	82.3	−0.5
Irish Conservative	Harry Hutchinson Augustus Stewart	914	17.7	+0.5
Majority		3,349	64.6	−1.0
Turnout		5,177	74.7	−5.3
Registered electors		6,932		
Irish Parliamentary hold		Swing	−0.5	

1885 general election: North Donegal
Party	Candidate	Votes	%	±%
Irish Parliamentary	James Edward O'Doherty	4,597	82.8	
Irish Loyal and Patriotic Union	Harry Hutchinson Augustus Stewart	952	17.2	
Majority		3,645	65.6	
Turnout		5,549	80.0	
Registered electors		6,932		
Irish Parliamentary win (new seat)				
