= John Mains =

John Mains (1851–1901) was an Irish nationalist politician and member of parliament (MP) in the House of Commons of the United Kingdom of Great Britain and Ireland.

He was elected as an Irish National Federation (Anti-Parnellite) MP for the North Donegal constituency at the 1892 general election. He did not contest the 1895 general election.

Parliament of the United Kingdom
Preceded by James Rochfort Maguire	Member of Parliament for North Donegal; 1892 – 1895	Succeeded by Thomas Bartholomew Curran
