= Hugh O'Donnell (died 1625) =

Irish-born soldier (1605–1625)

- Born: June 1605; Ulster, Ireland
- Died: April 1625 (aged 19); Breda, Spanish Netherlands
- Parents: Caffar O'Donnell (father); Rosa O'Doherty (mother)
- Military career
- Allegiance: Spanish Empire
- Rank: Captain
- Conflicts: Eighty Years War; Siege of Breda †

Captain Hugh O'Donnell (Irish: Aodh Ó Domhnaill; June 1605 – April 1625) was an Irish-born soldier who served in the first Irish regiment (tercio) of the Spanish military. He was the son of Gaelic nobles Caffar O'Donnell and Rosa O'Doherty, and took part in the Flight of the Earls. He fought in the Eighty Years' War and died in the Siege of Breda, aged 19.

== Family background and early life ==
Hugh O'Donnell was born in June 1605. He was descended from the O'Donnell clan of Tyrconnell, a Gaelic kingdom associated with County Donegal. His father Caffar was the youngest son of Hugh McManus O'Donnell, who ruled as Lord of Tyrconnell from 1566 to 1592. Caffar served with his elder brothers Hugh Roe, Rory and Manus during the Nine Years' War, which ended with the Irish confederacy's surrender in 1603.

Hugh's mother, Rosa O'Doherty, was a daughter of Sean O'Doherty of Inishowen and brother of Cahir O'Doherty. Caffar also had an illegitimate son, named Conn, with another woman. According to Darren McGettigan, Conn was born with six toes on one foot. According to Francis Martin O'Donnell and Jerrold Casway, it was Hugh who had six toes on one foot.

Following the death of his uncle Hugh Roe, who was associated with the Aodh Engeach prophecy, young Hugh became associated with the same prophecy. It alleged that if two men named Hugh succeeded each other as O'Donnell chief, the last Hugh shall "be a monarch in Ireland and quite banish thence all foreign nations and conquerors".

== Spanish Netherlands ==
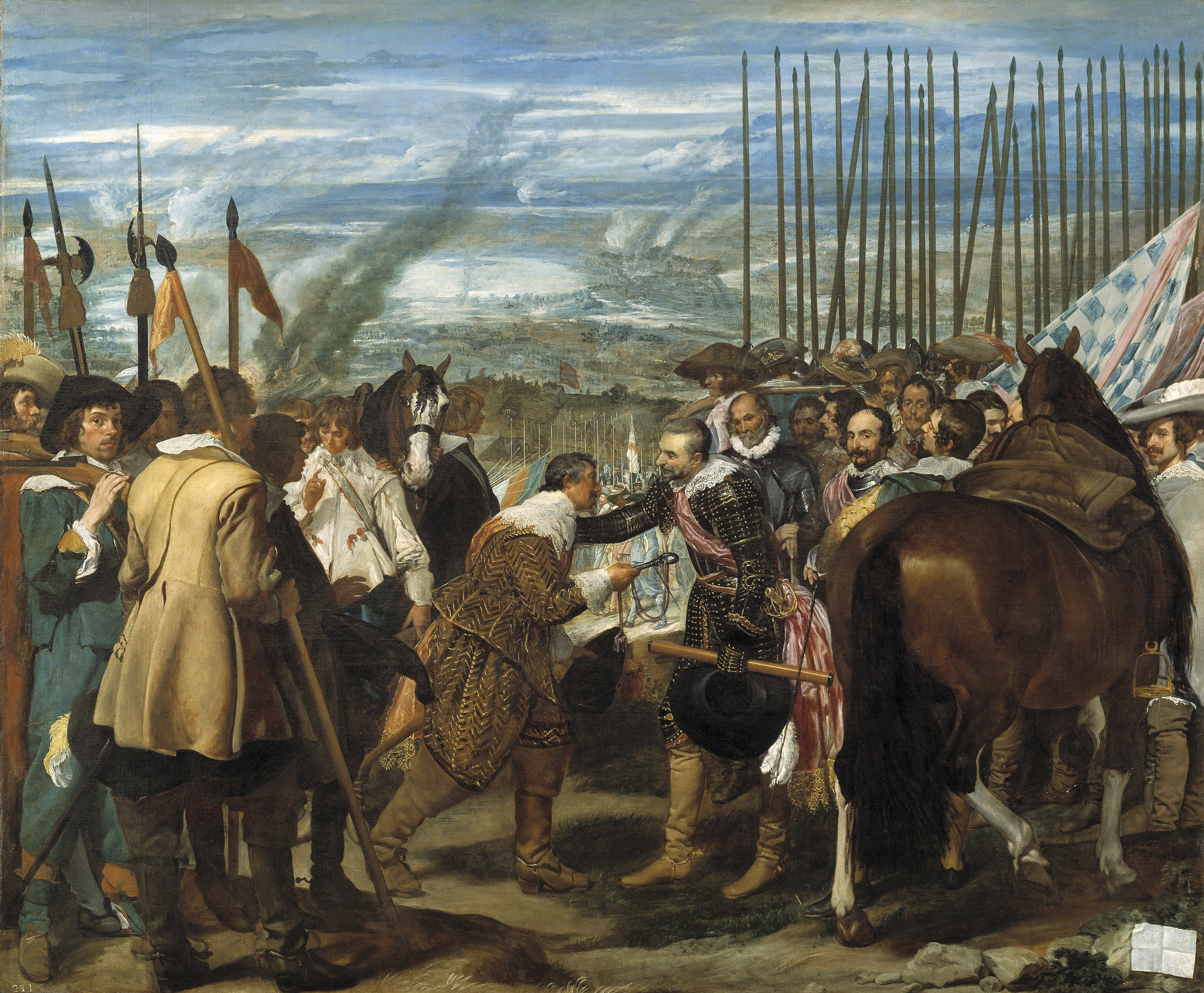
Hugh O'Donnell died at the Siege of Breda in 1625.

In September 1607, Hugh accompanied his parents and extended family, led by his uncle Rory and the Earl of Tyrone, on the Flight of the Earls.

At midday on 13 September, O'Neill and his family arrived at Caffar's home in Ballindrait. Caffar (and presumably Rosa) joined the group that night, crossing the River Foyle and reaching Ramelton at daybreak the following day. They arrived at Rathmullan, a seaside village on Lough Swilly where Rory was waiting for them with a ship. Under the harried circumstances, Rosa and Caffar attempted to retrieve Hugh and Conn from their respective foster-families. Caffar learnt of Hugh's imminent arrival, and he quickly rode to intercept his infant son and the foster-father on the road to Ramelton. Caffar "violently" seized the child and hastily returned to the ship. Conn's foster-father made off with the child, and Caffar had to leave Ireland without him.

Hugh's younger cousin, Hugh Albert O'Donnell (son of Rory), was also on the flight.

The refugees hoped to reached Spain, but were turned away due to Philip III's fears of violating the Treaty of London. Thus the refugees spent the winter in Leuven in the Spanish Netherlands. Many of the refugees were compelled to leave their children behind in Leuven under the care of Franciscans. Hugh and his cousin Hugh Albert were left in Leuven, whilst their fathers continued to Rome. Hugh's mother Rosa remained in the Spanish Netherlands. Rory and Caffar both died of illness in Rome in late 1608.

The two boys remained in the care of their nurses at the convent until October 1610, when they were given over to Hugh MacCaughwell, the Franciscan superior of the Irish College in Leuven. At the Irish College, the O'Donnell cousins were raised in the company of the Earl of Tyrone's sons Shane and Brian. Rosa and Hugh's aunt Nuala were made responsible for the two young nobles.

Hugh O'Donnell eventually became a captain in the first Irish regiment in the Spanish army (the "Old Irish Regiment"; Spanish: El Tercio Viejo Irelandés), which was led by Shane. Hugh O'Donnell died in 1625 in the Siege of Breda. His death was reported under the date of 20 April 1625, and he was laid to rest in the chapel of the Irish Franciscans. He was not yet twenty years old.

== Sources ==
- "Annals of the Four Masters". CELT. June 19, 2016. "originally published in 1636"
- Burke, Sir Bernard (1866). A Genealogical History of the Dormant: Abeyant, Forfeited, and Extinct Peerages of the British Empire. Harrison.
- Casway, Jerrold (1981). "Rosa O Dogherty: A Gaelic Woman". Seanchas Ardmhacha: Journal of the Armagh Diocesan Historical Society. 10 (1): 42–62. doi:10.2307/29740947. ISSN 0488-0196. JSTOR 29740947.
- Casway, Jerrold (1984). Owen Roe O'Neill and the Struggle for Catholic Ireland. Digitized by the Internet Archive in 2022 with funding from Kahle/Austin Foundation. Philadelphia: University of Pennsylvania Press. ISBN 0-8122-7895-X.
- Casway, Jerrold (2003). "Heroines or Victims? The Women of the Flight of the Earls". New Hibernia Review / Iris Éireannach Nua. 7 (1): 56–74. ISSN 1092-3977. JSTOR 20557855.
- Casway, Jerrold (2016). "Catherine Magennis and the Wives of Hugh O'Neill". Seanchas Ardmhacha: Journal of the Armagh Diocesan Historical Society. 26 (1): 69–79. ISSN 0488-0196. JSTOR 48568219.
- Jennings, Brendan (1941). "The Career of Hugh, Son of Rory O Donnell, Earl of Tirconnel, in the Low Countries, 1607-1642". Studies: An Irish Quarterly Review. 30 (118): 219–234. ISSN 0039-3495. JSTOR 30097953.
- McGettigan, Darren (2005). Red Hugh O'Donnell and the Nine Years War. Dublin: Four Courts Press. ISBN 978-1-8518-2887-6. OL 11952048M.
- McGettigan, Darren (October 2009). "O'Donnell, Caffar". Dictionary of Irish Biography. doi:10.3318/dib.002288.v1. Archived from the original on 27 October 2021.
- McGurk, John (2007). "The Flight of the Earls: Escape or Strategic Regrouping?". History Ireland. 15 (4): 16–21. ISSN 0791-8224. JSTOR 27725653.
- McNeill, Ronald John (1911). "O'Neill" . In Chisholm, Hugh (ed.). Encyclopædia Britannica. Vol. 20 (11th ed.). Cambridge University Press. pp. 107–111.
- Meehan, Helen (2006). "The Early 17th Century and Rory O'Donnell". Donegal Annual. 58: 45–66.
- Morgan, Hiram (1993). Tyrone's Rebellion: The outbreak of the Nine Years' War in Tudor Ireland. London: The Boydell Press. ISBN 0-85115-683-5.
- O'Clery, Lughaidh; O'Clery, Cucogry; Murphy, Denis (1895). Beatha Aodha Ruaidh ui Dhomhnaill. The life of Hugh Roe O'Donnell, prince of Tirconnell (1586-1602). Digitized by the Internet Archive in 2013. Dublin: Fallon & Co.
- O'Donnell, Francis Martin (2020), Memorialising Emigré Dignity - The Cultural Heritage of St. Anthony's College, Leuven, pp. 1–32
- Walsh, Micheline Kerney (1996). An exile of Ireland, Hugh O'Neill, Prince of Ulster. Dublin: Four Courts Press. ISBN 978-1-85182-234-8.
