= James Halpin =

James Halpin (June 1843 – 26 July 1909) was an Irish farmer, building contractor and politician.

James Halpin farmed a considerable amount of land in County Clare and was the proprietor of the Fergus Vale creamery. He was associated with several Nationalist movements, including the Land League and the Gaelic League. He was twice imprisoned in connection with Land League activities. He was a Poor Law Guardian of Ennis Union and chairman for three years.

He was elected unopposed as Member of Parliament for West Clare in 1906, and remained as member until his death.

Parliament of the United Kingdom
Preceded by John Eustace Jameson	Member of Parliament for West Clare; 1906 – 1909	Succeeded by Arthur Lynch
