= 1909 West Clare by-election =

UK Parliamentary by-election

The 1909 West Clare by-election was held on 3 September 1909. The by-election was held due to the death of the incumbent Irish Parliamentary MP, James Halpin. It was won by the Irish Parliamentary candidate Arthur Lynch, who was unopposed.
