= West Clare =

UK parliamentary constituency in Ireland, 1885–1922

- Former county constituency for the House of Commons

1885–1922
- Seats: 1
- Created from: County Clare
- Replaced by: Clare

West Clare was a UK parliament constituency in Ireland, returning one Member of Parliament from 1885 to 1922.

Prior to the 1885 United Kingdom general election the area was part of the County Clare constituency. From 1922, on the establishment of the Irish Free State, it was not represented in the UK Parliament.

== Boundaries ==
This constituency comprised the western part of County Clare, consisting of the baronies of Clonderalaw, Corcomroe, Ibrickan and Moyarta, and those parts of the baronies of Inchiquin and Islands not contained within the constituency of East Clare.

== Members of Parliament ==
| Election | Member | Party |
|---|---|---|
| 1885 | Jeremiah Jordan | Nationalist |
| 1892 | James Rochfort Maguire | Parnellite Nationalist |
| 1895 | John Eustace Jameson | Anti-Parnellite Nationalist |
| 1900 | John Eustace Jameson | Nationalist |
| 1904 | John Eustace Jameson | Unionist |
| 1906 | James Halpin | Nationalist |
| 1909 | Arthur Lynch | Nationalist |
| 1918 | Brian O'Higgins | Sinn Féin |
| 1922 | constituency abolished | |

== Elections ==
=== Elections in the 1880s ===
General election 1 December 1885: Clare West
| Party | Candidate | Votes | % | ±% |
|---|---|---|---|---|
| Irish Parliamentary | Jeremiah Jordan | 6,763 | 95.9 | |
| Irish Conservative | Robert William Carey Reeves | 289 | 4.1 | |
| Majority | | 6,474 | 91.8 | |
| Turnout | | 7,052 | 71.9 | |
| Registered electors | | 9,813 | | |
| Irish Parliamentary win (new seat) | | | | |

General election 6 July 1886: Clare West
| Party | Candidate | Votes | % | ±% |
|---|---|---|---|---|
| Irish Parliamentary | Jeremiah Jordan | Unopposed | | |
| Registered electors | | 9,813 | | |
| Irish Parliamentary hold | | | | |

=== Elections in the 1890s ===
General election 14 July 1892: Clare West
| Party | Candidate | Votes | % | ±% |
|---|---|---|---|---|
| Irish National League | James Rochfort Maguire | 3,878 | 57.5 | N/A |
| Irish National Federation | Bernard O’Connor | 2,871 | 42.5 | N/A |
| Majority | | 1,007 | 15.0 | N/A |
| Turnout | | 6,749 | 60.9 | N/A |
| Registered electors | | 11,077 | | |
| Irish National League gain from Irish Parliamentary | | Swing | N/A | |

General election 23 July 1895: Clare West
| Party | Candidate | Votes | % | ±% |
|---|---|---|---|---|
| Irish National Federation | John Eustace Jameson | 3,376 | 53.2 | +10.7 |
| Irish National League | James Rochfort Maguire | 2,973 | 46.8 | −10.7 |
| Majority | | 403 | 6.4 | N/A |
| Turnout | | 6,349 | 60.5 | −0.4 |
| Registered electors | | 10,488 | | |
| Irish National Federation gain from Irish National League | | Swing | +10.7 | |

=== Elections in the 1900s ===
General election 5 October 1900: Clare West
| Party | Candidate | Votes | % | ±% |
|---|---|---|---|---|
| Irish Parliamentary | John Eustace Jameson | Unopposed | | |
| Registered electors | | 10,683 | | |
| Irish Parliamentary hold | | | | |

General election 18 January 1906: Clare West
| Party | Candidate | Votes | % | ±% |
|---|---|---|---|---|
| Irish Parliamentary | James Halpin | Unopposed | | |
| Registered electors | | 8,989 | | |
| Irish Parliamentary hold | | | | |

- Death of Halpin

By-election 3 September 1909: Clare West
| Party | Candidate | Votes | % | ±% |
|---|---|---|---|---|
| Irish Parliamentary | Arthur Lynch | Unopposed | | |
| Registered electors | | 8,854 | | |
| Irish Parliamentary hold | | | | |

=== Elections in the 1910s ===
General election 19 January 1910: Clare West
| Party | Candidate | Votes | % | ±% |
|---|---|---|---|---|
| Irish Parliamentary | Arthur Lynch | Unopposed | | |
| Registered electors | | 8,834 | | |
| Irish Parliamentary hold | | | | |

General election 8 December 1910: Clare West
| Party | Candidate | Votes | % | ±% |
|---|---|---|---|---|
| Irish Parliamentary | Arthur Lynch | Unopposed | | |
| Registered electors | | 8,834 | | |
| Irish Parliamentary hold | | | | |

General Election 14 December 1918: Clare West
| Party | Candidate | Votes | % | ±% |
|---|---|---|---|---|
| Sinn Féin | Brian O'Higgins | Unopposed | | |
| Registered electors | | 21,674 | | |
| Sinn Féin gain from Irish Parliamentary | | | | |
