= Dohertya =

Scientific classification
- Kingdom: Animalia
- Phylum: Arthropoda
- Class: Insecta
- Order: Lepidoptera
- Superfamily: Noctuoidea
- Family: Erebidae
- Subfamily: Arctiinae
- Tribe: Lithosiini
- Genus: Dohertya; Hampson, 1894
- Species: D. cymatophoroides

Binomial name
- Dohertya cymatophoroides Hampson, 1894

Genus of moths

Dohertya is a monotypic moth genus in the subfamily Arctiinae. Its single species, Dohertya cymatophoroides, is found in Myanmar. The genus and species were first described by George Hampson in 1894.
