= Rosa O'Neill =

Irish noblewoman (died 1660)

Rosa O'Doherty
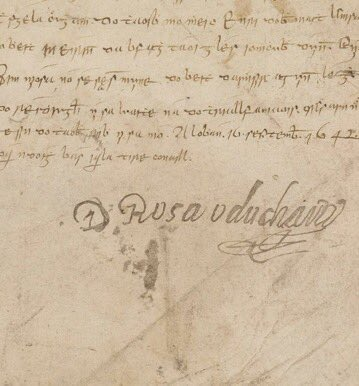
- Rosa's signature
- Born: c. 1588; Ulster, Ireland
- Died: 1 November 1660; Brussels, Spanish Netherlands (modern-day Belgium)
- Buried: St Anthony's College, Leuven
- Spouses: Caffar O'Donnell (m. 1604; died 1608); Owen Roe O'Neill (m. 1613; died 1649)
- Issue: Hugh O'Donnell

Rosa O'Neill (born Rosa O'Doherty; Irish: Róisín Ní Dhochartaigh; c. 1588 – 1 November 1660) was an Irish noblewoman of the O'Doherty clan of Inishowen.

== Biography ==
Rosa was born circa 1588 or 1590, the daughter of Sir Seán Óg O'Doherty and his first wife. Rosa had five siblings (two sisters and three brothers). Her eldest brother was Cahir O'Doherty. The O'Doherty clan were the traditional rulers of Inishowen in the north-west of Ulster. Seán Óg died on 27 January 1601, making Cahir clan chief. Cahir fought on the Crown's side during the Nine Years' War (1593–1603). In 1608, angered at his treatment by local officials, Cahir launched O'Doherty's rebellion by burning Derry. Cahir was defeated and killed at the Battle of Kilmacrennan, and Inishowen was confiscated from the family.

In late 1604, Rosa married Caffar O'Donnell, younger brother of both Hugh Roe O'Donnell and Rory O'Donnell, 1st Earl of Tyrconnell. In 1607 both Caffar and Rosa accompanied Tyrconnell to Continental Europe in the Flight of the Earls. Caffar died of fever in Rome the following year, leaving Rosa a widow at the age of twenty.

Rosa remarried in 1613–14 to Owen Roe O'Neill, an Irish officer serving in the Spanish army whom she met in Flanders.

In 1642, when Owen Roe returned to Ireland to serve the Irish Confederacy during the War of Three Kingdoms, Rosa accompanied him. She arrived after her husband, landing at Wexford in the company of Colonel Richard O'Farrell with supplies and reinforcements for her husband's Ulster Army. Owen Roe became a leading figure of the Irish Confederacy, enjoying mixed fortunes but winning a notable success against Scottish forces at the Battle of Benburb in 1646.

Owen Roe O'Neill died at Cloughoughter Castle in County Cavan in November 1649. Rosa had been in Galway and arrived a few days after her husband's death by natural causes. She went to Flanders following the Cromwellian conquest of Ireland. Rosa lived in Brussels until her death on 1 November 1660. She was buried at the Franciscan College of St. Anthony of Padua in Louvain. A gravestone marks her burial place.

== Sources ==
- Casway, Jerrold (2009). "O'Doherty, Rosa". Dictionary of Irish Biography. doi:10.3318/dib.006685.v2. Archived from the original on 22 September 2021.
- Casway, Jerrold (1981). "Rosa O Dogherty: A Gaelic Woman". Seanchas Ardmhacha: Journal of the Armagh Diocesan Historical Society. 10 (1): 42–62. doi:10.2307/29740947. ISSN 0488-0196. JSTOR 29740947.
- Casway, Jerrold (1984). Owen Roe O'Neill and the Struggle for Catholic Ireland. Digitized by the Internet Archive in 2022 with funding from Kahle/Austin Foundation. Philadelphia: University of Pennsylvania Press. ISBN 0-8122-7895-X.
- O'Donnell, Francis Martin (1 January 2020). "Memorialising Emigré Dignity - The Cultural Heritage of St. Anthony's College, Leuven". Irish College Leuven - Memorialising Emigré Dignity - The Cultural Heritage of St. Anthony's College, Leuven.
