= William O'Doherty =

Irish politician

Member of Parliament for North Donegal
- In office 1900 – 18 May 1905
- Preceded by: Thomas Bartholomew Curran
- Succeeded by: John Muldoon

Member of Londonderry Corporation
- In office 1896 – 18 May 1905
- Constituency: West Ward

Personal details
- Born: 1868 Carndonagh, County Donegal, Ireland
- Died: 18 May 1905 (aged 36–37) London, England
- Party: Irish Parliamentary Party
- Spouse: Margaret Mitchell (m. 1894)
- Occupation: Politician, solicitor, coroner

William O'Doherty (1868 – 18 May 1905) was an Irish nationalist politician and Member of Parliament (MP) in the House of Commons of the United Kingdom of Great Britain and Ireland.

== Biography ==
O'Doherty was born in 1868 in Carndonagh, County Donegal. He attended St Columb's College in Derry. In 1893 he became a solicitor, and a year later became the coroner for Inishowen (North Donegal). In 1896 he was elected to the West Ward constituency on Londonderry Corporation. He was elected as the Irish Parliamentary Party MP for North Donegal constituency at the 1900 general election. In 1902 O'Doherty was criticised by the United Irish League for attending the coronation of King Edward VII and called on him to resign. He responded to the criticism but stating the separation policy of the party was impractical.

On 18 May 1905, while in the House of Commons, O'Doherty suffered a paralytic stroke and later succumbed to a haemorrhage. The subsequent by-election for his vacant seat was won by John Muldoon.

== Personal life ==
In 1894 he married Margaret Mitchell.

Parliament of the United Kingdom
Preceded by Thomas Bartholomew Curran	Member of Parliament for North Donegal; 1900 – 1905	Succeeded by John Muldoon
