= Caffar O'Donnell =

Irish nobleman (c. 1583 – 1608)

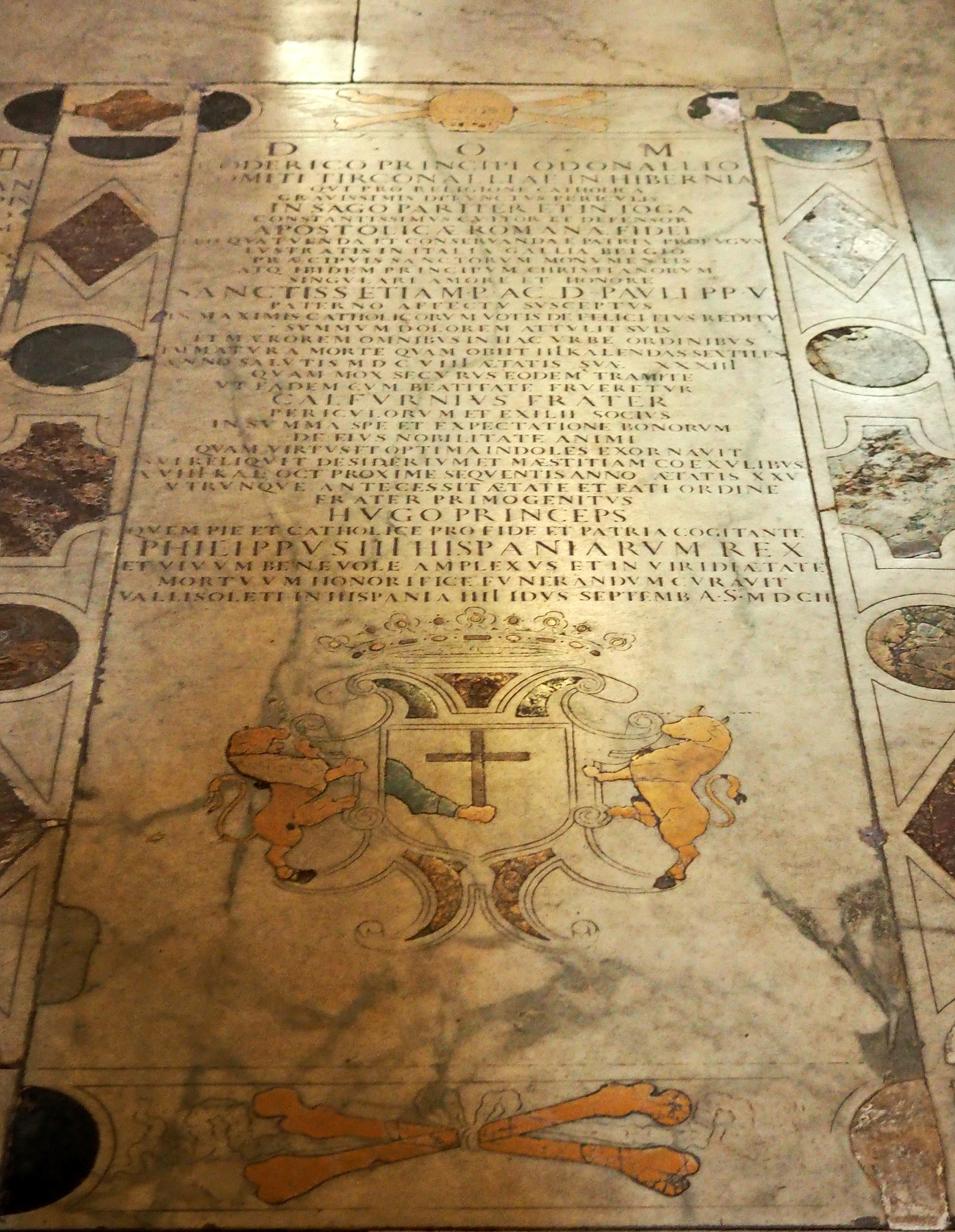
- Inscription above the tombs of Caffar and his brother Rory in San Pietro in Montorio, Rome
- Born: c. 1583; Tyrconnell, Ulster, Ireland
- Died: 15 September 1608 (aged 25); Rome, Papal States
- Spouse: Rosa O'Doherty (m. 1604)
- Issue: Hugh O'Donnell; Caffar Oge "Conn" O'Donnell (ill.)
- Father: Hugh McManus O'Donnell
- Mother: Iníon Dubh

Caffar O'Donnell (Irish: Cathbharr Ó Domhnaill; Latinised Calfurnius; c. 1583 – 15 September 1608) (Note: Unless otherwise stated, all dates before 1752 are given in the Gregorian calendar, which was used by the Irish confederates and chroniclers throughout Caffar O'Donnell's lifetime, as well as in Catholic Europe.) was an Irish nobleman of the O'Donnell clan of Tyrconnell. The youngest brother of Hugh Roe O'Donnell, Caffar fought for the Irish confederacy in the Nine Years' War.

In 1605 he married Rosa O'Doherty, sister of Cahir O'Doherty. Caffar took part in the Flight of the Earls in September 1607, leaving Ireland for mainland Europe. He settled in Rome but shortly afterwards died of a fever, aged 25. He is buried in San Pietro in Montorio, beside his older brother Rory O'Donnell, 1st Earl of Tyrconnell.

== Early life ==
Born c. 1583, Caffar was the fourth and youngest son of Hugh McManus O'Donnell, a Gaelic Irish lord who ruled Tyrconnell from 1566 to 1592. Caffar's mother was his father's second wife, Scottish aristocrat Iníon Dubh. His older brothers were Hugh Roe, Rory and Manus, and his sisters included Nuala, Mary and Margaret. He also had older half-siblings from his father's previous relationships, including Donal and Siobhán.

== Military career ==
Caffar and his brothers belonged to a confederacy of Irish lords, led in part by the eldest brother, Hugh Roe, which opposed English rule during the Nine Years' War (1593–1603). Caffar fought alongside his brothers leading a unit of firearm infantry at the Battle of Curlew Pass in 1599, which resulted in a crucial victory for the Irish confederacy. Manus died from injuries sustained at the Battle of Lifford in 1600. In 1601, Caffar accompanied Hugh Roe and Rory on the march to Kinsale in County Cork, where Spanish forces had arrived to reinforce the confederacy.

Caffar fought at the Siege of Kinsale where the confederacy faced a crushing defeat. After the battle he returned to Lower Connacht with Rory. Despite attempts to recover the military initiative, the confederacy was severely weakened. Hugh Roe died of illness on 9 September 1602 and Rory surrendered to the Crown at Athlone on 14 December [O.S. 4 December]. The confederates received generous peace terms from King James I; Rory was created 1st Earl of Tyrconnell. Following the war, Caffar resided at his lands in Ballindrait.

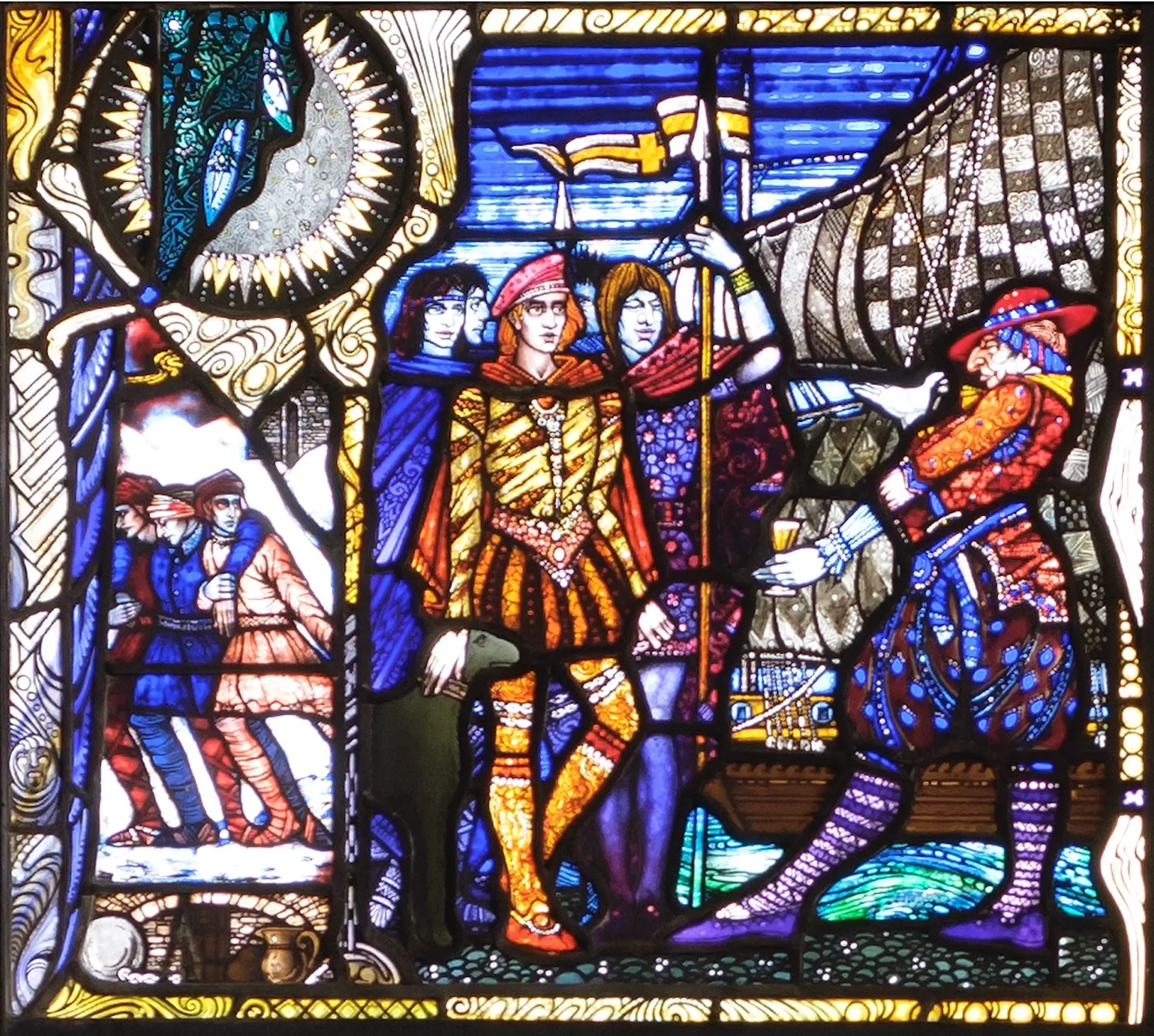
A depiction of Hugh Roe O'Donnell, brother of Caffar, in the Kevin Barry Memorial Window by Harry Clarke Studios

== Marriage and children ==
In 1598, Caffar had an illegitimate son, Caffar Oge "Conn" O'Donnell, with a woman he did not marry.

In late 1604, Caffar married Rosa O'Doherty, a daughter of John O'Doherty, Lord of Inishowen, and sister of loyalist-turned-rebel Cahir O'Doherty. The O'Doherty clan were sub-chiefs to the O'Donnell clan, and the marriage consolidated their families' traditional bond. The couple's son, Hugh O'Donnell, was born around June 1605.

According to historian Darren McGettigan, Conn was born with six toes on one foot, though historians Francis Martin O'Donnell and Jerrold Casway state it was Hugh who had six toes. In 1608, British politician John Davies stated that the O'Donnell family had high hopes for the child, as "one of their saints of Tyrconnell" prophesied that a six-toed O'Donnell child "shall drive all the Englishmen out of Ireland".

Children of the Gaelic Irish nobility were traditionally fostered to fellow clans in the hopes of developing political alliances. By September 1607, both of Caffar's children were living with their foster families.

== Flight of the Earls ==
In 1607, Caffar's brother Rory and his wartime ally Hugh O'Neill, Earl of Tyrone, faced potential arrest for their involvement in treasonous activities; the earls and many of their relatives quietly fled to continental Europe. At midday on 13 September, O'Neill and his family arrived at Caffar's home in Ballindrait. Caffar (and presumably Rosa) joined the group that night, crossing the River Foyle and reaching Ramelton at daybreak the following day, later arriving at nearby Rathmullan, a seaside village on Lough Swilly where Rory was waiting for them with a ship. Under the harried circumstances, Rosa and Caffar attempted to retrieve Hugh and Conn from their respective foster-families. Caffar learnt of Hugh's imminent arrival, and he quickly rode to intercept his infant son and the foster-father on the road to Ramelton. Caffar "violently" seized the child and hastily returned to the ship. Conn's foster-father made off with Conn, and Caffar had to leave Ireland without him.

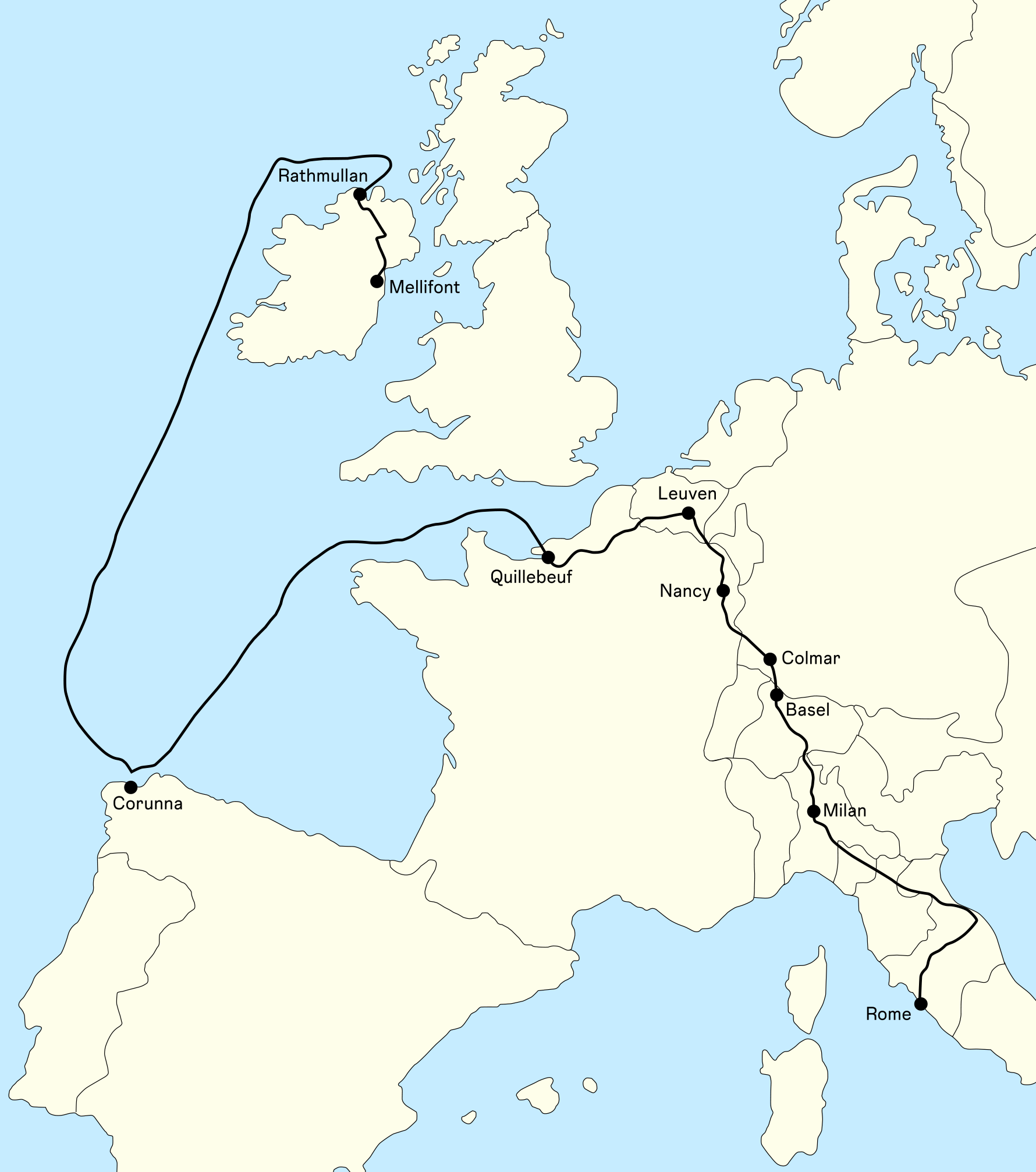
Caffar's journey through Europe

The group of Irish nobles, accompanied by about 100 passengers (including their domestic workers and retinue), embarked from Rathmullan on 14 September, bound for A Coruña in Spain. The ship was driven by storms into port at Quillebeuf in Normandy, and were immediately diverted by the French to the court of the Archduke Albert VII in Flanders. The émigrés travelled to the Spanish Netherlands, where they were met by prominent Irish residents. The nobles lived in Leuven for three months. Despite their petitioning, Philip III of Spain would not allow them to enter Spain for fear of violating the 1604 Anglo-Spanish peace treaty. In mid-December, the émigrés received news that Albert VII wanted them to leave his states. Caffar and Rosa left Hugh in the Netherlands under the care of the convent Dames Blanches of Leuven, and on 28 February 1608, the couple left with a group of thirty-two people on horseback (plus other women in a coach) to travel southwards. On 29 April, the émigrés were welcomed into Rome by a large procession of cardinals. The nobles were granted a small monthly pension by Pope Paul V, but they were displeased with their reduced lifestyles and quickly found themselves in debt.

== Illness and death ==
In early July 1608, Caffar travelled to Ostia, a coastal town fifteen miles west of Rome, for a holiday and a "change of air". He was accompanied by his brother Rory, Hugh O'Neill, 4th Baron Dungannon, and Donal O'Carroll, Vicar General of Killaloe. Unfortunately, the men "all agreed that that particular place [was] one of the worst and most unhealthy for climate in all Italy", as the marshlands were infested with mosquitos. Rory caught a fever on 18 July, Caffar caught it the next day, and Rory died of fever on 28 July. Despite constant attention from Rosa and the doctors, Caffar's condition deteriorated. He was moved to a better residence, but following a two-month illness, he died of fever in Rome on 15 September. He was 25 years old. Rory and Caffar were buried beside each other in San Pietro in Montorio, dressed in the brown habits of Franciscans. Caffar's funeral allegedly included a "splendid cortege accompanying him in procession" to the church.

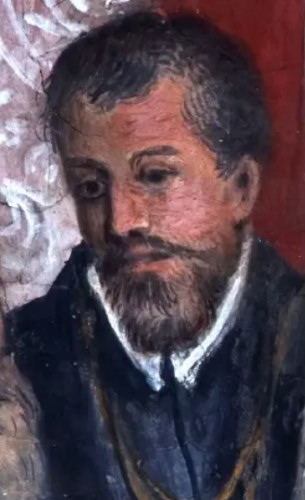
A depiction of Rory O'Donnell, 1st Earl of Tyrconnell and brother of Caffar, from a mural in the Pope Paul V Gallery of the Vatican Library

As soon as [Rory] was free of care, his brother Caffar, as he enjoyed the same path with the same happiness, the companion of his exile and dangers, in the highest hope and expectation of good things from the nobility of his spirit, which virtue and the best character adorned, left his desire and sorrow to his co-exiles on 14 September in the next year [1609] at the age of 25.

— English translation of an excerpt from the Latin inscription on Rory and Caffar's tombs

== Legacy ==
The Irish annals recorded that Caffar was remembered for his feasts with which he entertained his followers. The poet Eoghan Ruadh Mac an Bhaird, who took part in the Flight, wrote an elegy titled Lament for the Princes of Tyrone and Tyrconnell (Buried in Rome), which laments the death of Irish nobles in Rome. Caffar is mentioned: "Beside his brother Cathbar, whom / Tirconnell of the Helmets mourns / In deep despair— / For valour, truth, and comely bloom, / For all that greatens and adorns, / A peerless pair."

Caffar was the last of his brothers to die, and subsequently leadership of the O'Donnell family passed to Rory's son Hugh Albert O'Donnell, 2nd Earl of Tyrconnell. In 1614, Rosa remarried to Captain Owen Roe O'Neill, Tyrone's nephew and her own cousin, whom she had met in the Spanish Netherlands.

Caffar's son Hugh became a captain in the Spanish army. He fought in the Eighty Years' War and was killed in 1625 during the Siege of Breda. Conn remained in Ireland and was raised in the household of Lord Deputy Henry Cary, 1st Viscount Falkland. Conn was later imprisoned in a London prison, but escaped in 1629 and fled to Flanders alongside his cousins Mary Stuart O'Donnell and Hugh O'Rourke.

== Ancestry ==
Ancestors of Caffar O'Donnell (Note: Hugh McManus O'Donnell's parents were Manus O'Donnell and Siobhán O'Neill. Fiona MacDonald's parents were James MacDonald, 6th of Dunnyveg, and Agnes Campbell. Manus O'Donnell's father was Hugh Dubh O'Donnell. Siobhán O'Neill's father was Conn Bacagh O'Neill, 1st Earl of Tyrone. James MacDonald's parents were Alexander Carragh MacDonnell, 5th of Dunnyveg, and Catherine MacDonald. Agnes Campbell's parents were Colin Campbell, 3rd Earl of Argyll and Jean Gordon.)

8. Hugh Dubh O'Donnell, Lord of Tyrconnell
4. Manus O'Donnell, Lord of Tyrconnell
2. Hugh McManus O'Donnell, Lord of Tyrconnell
10. Conn Bacagh O'Neill, 1st Earl of Tyrone
5. Siobhán O'Neill
1. Caffar O'Donnell
12. Alexander Carragh MacDonnell, 5th of Dunnyveg
6. James MacDonald, 6th of Dunnyveg
13. Catherine MacDonald
3. Fiona MacDonald
14. Colin Campbell, 3rd Earl of Argyll
7. Agnes Campbell
15. Jean Gordon
