= Brian O'Higgins =

Irish writer, poet and politician (1882–1963)

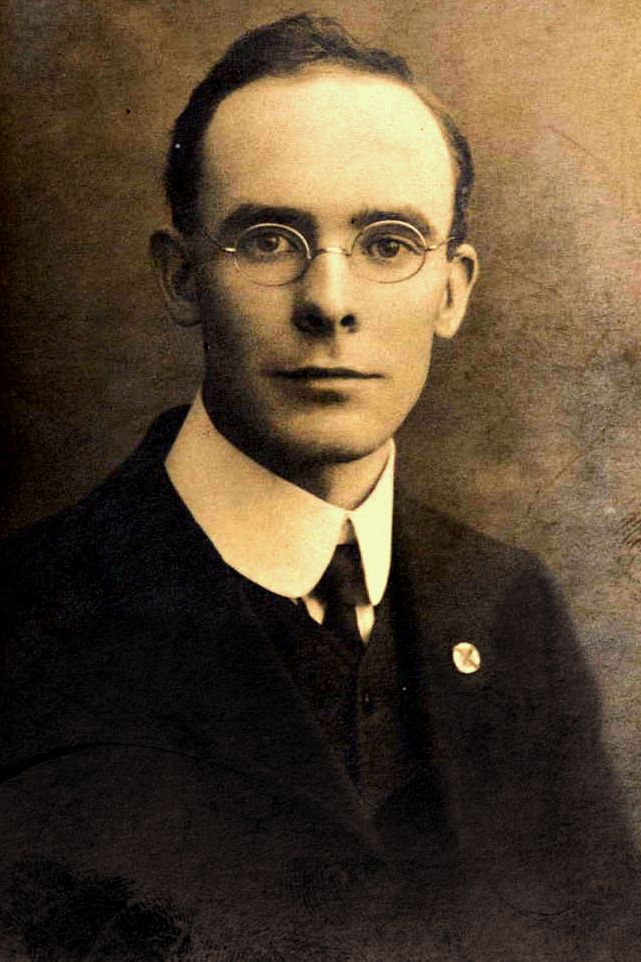
- O'Higgins, c. 1914

President of Sinn Féin
- In office 30 April 1931 – 1933
- Vice President: Mary MacSwiney; John Madden
- Preceded by: John J. O'Kelly
- Succeeded by: Michael O'Flanagan

Leas-Cheann Comhairle of Dáil Éireann
- In office 26 August 1921 – 28 February 1922
- Ceann Comhairle: Eoin MacNeill
- Preceded by: John J. O'Kelly
- Succeeded by: Pádraic Ó Máille

Teachta Dála
- In office May 1921 – June 1927
- Constituency: Clare
- In office December 1918 – May 1921
- Constituency: Clare West

Personal details
- Born: 1 July 1882 Kilskeer, County Meath, Ireland
- Died: 10 March 1963 (aged 80) Clontarf, Dublin, Ireland
- Party: Sinn Féin
- Spouse: Anna Ní Chionnaigh (m. 1908; died 1958)
- Children: 7
- Occupation: Politician, writer and poet

Military service
- Allegiance: Irish Volunteers; Irish Republican Army
- Years of service: 1913–1923
- Rank: Volunteer
- Battles/wars: Easter Rising; Irish War of Independence; Irish Civil War

Brian O'Higgins (Irish: Brian Ó hUigínn; 1 July 1882 – 10 March 1963), also known as Brian na Banban, was an Irish writer, poet, soldier and politician who was a founding member of Sinn Féin and served as President of the organisation from 1931 to 1933. He was a leading figure within 20th century Irish republicanism and was widely regarded for his literary abilities.

== Family and early life ==
Brian O'Higgins was born in 1882, the youngest of fourteen children of small farmers in Kilskeer, County Meath. His great-grandfather, Seán Ó Huiginn, was a poor scholar from County Tyrone who was travelling to Munster before he encountered a group of men who were rushing to Tara to fight in the Rising of 1798. He promptly decided to partake in the rebellion and fought in the Battle of Tara Hill, where he was wounded and carried away to the small glen of Kilskeer to recuperate, but in Kilskeer he married and remained for the rest of his life. His father and uncles were members of the Irish Republican Brotherhood and took part in the abortive Fenian Rising, and later were supporters of Charles Stewart Parnell.

In 1886, O'Higgins began his education at the Kilskeer National School and his principal teacher was a young man named James Raleigh, a Limerick native whom O'Higgins described as a 'devoted lover of Ireland'. Raleigh taught his students Irish history and numerous patriotic ballads such as "My Land" by Thomas Davis, which undoubtedly had a lasting impact on O'Higgins. His childhood reading consisted of Young Ireland-influenced text such as Irish penny readings and Speeches from the dock, and nationalist story papers The Shamrock and The Emerald. When he was twelve, he had aspirations of becoming a journalist but for a poor family in rural Ireland, such things were unheard of, and so when he left school at fourteen, he became a draper's apprentice at nearby Clonmellon.

It was during his time in Clonmellon, in 1898, that he published his first article for the Irish Fireside Club and a year later, began writing poetry. Throughout this period, he would become a regular contributor to local newspapers such as the Meath Chronicle. One of the first poems he wrote, at the age of seventeen, was a eulogy dedicated to Father Eugene O'Growney, an Irish language activist and Gaelic scholar whom O'Higgins admired greatly. The poem was published under the title, The Dying Sagart, and achieved widespread popularity.

In 1900, O'Higgins published his first poem in the United Irishman, edited by Arthur Griffith and William Rooney. It was entitled Be Men To-day, and aimed at urging the people along the road to an independent Irish-speaking Ireland. After completing his apprenticeship, O'Higgins had no desire to continue working in drapery so he moved to Dublin in 1901 to work as a barman, and during his time there he joined the O'Growney Branch of the Gaelic League and Saint Finians Hurling Club. His health declined in 1903 and he returned to live in his native Meath. It was during his recuperation at home that he co-founded the local hurling club, whose grounds were later named in his memory (Páirc Uí hUigín).

O'Higgins was present at the first annual convention of the National Council of Sinn Féin on 28 November 1905, and wrote its first party anthem entitled 'Sinn Féin Amháin'. The song was sung at all gatherings of the organisation for a number of years.

After attending an Irish-language summer college at Ballingeary, County Cork, O'Higgins received a language teacher's certificate in 1906 and began work as a múinteoir taistil (travelling teacher) for the Gaelic League. During this time he founded Coláiste Uí Chomhraidhe, an Irish language college in Carrigaholt, County Clare. He became a good friend of Pádraig Pearse, after they first met in 1906.

In September 1908 he had married Anna Ní Chionnaigh (Kenny) and they had seven children.

He first published his poetry in book form in 1907 as The Voice of Banba: Songs and Recitations for Young Ireland. Some of O'Higgins' work is anodyne and sentimental stuff, as per his Christmas Stories and Sketches (1917), Hearts of Gold (1918) and Songs of the Sacred Heart (1921). These works were commended by the Bishop of Killaloe, the Sinn Féin-supporting Michael Fogarty, as being 'full of simple and profound religious feeling'.

O'Higgins' poem "Who is Ireland's Enemy?", was first published in September 1914 in Irish Freedom, in an edition entitled Germany Is Not Ireland's Enemy; it became popular during the 1918 Irish conscription crisis. According to Christopher M. Kennedy, the poem was "perhaps the most blatant example of using past wrongs committed by England to keep the old hatreds alive".

== Republican activity ==
British Army intelligence file for Bryan O'Higgins

O'Higgins was a founding member of the Irish Volunteers in 1913, which organised to work for Irish independence. On Easter Monday of 1916 he was in a group of Volunteers who were held at 41 Parnell Square as reserves, on account of their age, health or physical condition. This group was called to the GPO at six o'clock that evening. He was put on guard duty at the main entrance to the GPO and he later served under Quartermaster Michael Staines. He assisted in the evacuation of the wounded from the GPO on Friday evening and spent the night in a shed off Moore Street. He was deported to Stafford Gaol on May 1 and interned in Frongoch internment camp until February 1917.

In May 1918 he was arrested and deported to Birmingham Prison, and was elected as the Sinn Féin MP for Clare West at the 1918 general election.

In January 1919, Sinn Féin MPs who had been elected in the Westminster elections of 1918 refused to recognise the Parliament of the United Kingdom and instead assembled in Dublin as a revolutionary parliament called Dáil Éireann. He was involved in the establishment of the Republican courts in County Clare.

At the 1921 elections he was returned unopposed for the new 4-seat Clare constituency. He opposed the Anglo-Irish Treaty and voted against it. During the Irish Civil War, he was imprisoned in Oriel House, Mountjoy Jail and Tintown and went on hunger strike for twenty-five days.

He was re-elected as an Anti-Treaty Sinn Féin Teachta Dála (TD) at the 1922 and 1923 elections for the Clare constituency. He lost his seat at the June 1927 general election.

He resigned from Sinn Féin in 1934 along with Mary MacSwiney in protest against the election of Fr. Michael O'Flanagan as president citing that O'Flanagan had a state job and was "on the pay-roll of a usurping government".

In December 1938, O'Higgins was one of a group of seven people who had been elected to the Second Dáil in 1921, who met with the IRA Army Council under Seán Russell. At this meeting, the seven signed over what they believed was the authority of the Government of Dáil Éireann to the Army Council. Henceforth, the IRA Army Council perceived itself to be the legitimate government of the Irish Republic and, on this basis, the IRA and Sinn Féin justified their rejection of the states of the Republic of Ireland and Northern Ireland and political abstentionism from their parliamentary institutions.

Today, the dissident republican organisation Continuity IRA claim to be the heirs of this legitimacy and believe to be the legitimate continuation of the original Irish Republican Army or Óglaigh na hÉireann.

== Music ==
O'Higgins wrote the lyrics of the song "A Stór Mo Chroí" ("Treasure of My Heart"), which subsequently entered the Irish music oral tradition, set to the tune of the traditional Irish air Bruach na Carraige Báine. He also wrote 'The Boy from Tralee' about the execution of Charlie Kerins.

== Later life ==
From the late 1920s, he ran a successful business publishing greeting cards, calendars and devotional materials decorated with Celtic designs and O'Higgins' own verses.

Following the suppression of An Phoblacht in 1937, he founded and edited the Wolfe Tone Weekly from 1937–1939 until it was also banned by the Free State Government. From 1932 to 1962 he published the Wolfe Tone Annual, from his business at 56 Parnell Square, Dublin. This popular series of volumes gave popular accounts of episodes in Irish history from a republican viewpoint and he intended to cheer and inspire those true to 'the Separatist Idea and devoted to the vindication of all those who have sacrificed themselves for the full Independence and Gaelicisation of Ireland'. O'Higgins wrote numerous ballads and poems about Ireland throughout his lifetime. Many are still sung at Feiseanna and Fleadh Ceoils.

He was a devout Catholic and was heavily critical of those who tried to link the Republican struggle with socialism and communism. Several of his children became Catholic priests.

== Death ==
Higgins died while praying in Saint Anthony's Church in Clontarf, on 10 March 1963. He is buried in Glasnevin Cemetery.

== Bibliography ==
Books

- A Bunch of Wild Flowers, poems on religious subjects (1906)
- The Voice of Banba, songs, ballads and satires (1907)
- By a Hearth in Éireann, stories and sketches (1908)
- At the Hill o' the Road, songs and poems (1909)
- Síol na Saoirse, songs and poems in Irish (1910)
- Ballads of Battle, songs of the Irish freedom struggle (1910)
- Signal Fires, patriotic songs and ballads (1912)
- Sentinel Songs and Recitations (1915)
- Hearts of Gold, stories and sketches (1917)
- Christmas Stories and Sketches (1917)
- Fun o’ the Forge, humorous short stories (1917)
- An t-Aifrionn, Irish language prayer book for the Tridentine Mass (1918)
- Glór na nÓige, poetry for children (1920)
- Songs of the Sacred Heart (1920)
- The Soldier's Story of Easter Week (1925)
- Ten Golden Years Ago, a memorial to the 1916 Rising (1926)
- Songs of Glen na Móna, songs and poems (1929)
- Laughter-Lighted Memories, humorous anecdotes from the Irish revolutionary period (1932)
- A Rosary of Song, poems on sacred subjects (1932)
- Wolfe Tone Annual, popular accounts of Irish history (1932–1962)
- Sinn Féin and Freedom (1933)
- Amhráin agus Dánta, songs and poems in Irish (1954)
- Glory Be to God, a book of religious verse (1959)

Pamphlets

- Unconquered Ireland (1927)
- The Little Book of Christmas (1930)
- The Little Book of the Blessed Eucharist (1931)
- The Little Book of the Sacred Heart (1936)
- Martyrs for Ireland, the story of MacCormick and Barnes (1940)
- Tony d'Arcy and Seán MacNeela, the story of their martyrdom (1940)
- Oliver of Ireland, the story of Blessed Oliver Plunkett (1945)
- The Little Book of Exile, dedicated to Irish Catholic missionaries (1950)
- The Little Book of the Blessed Virgin (1952)
- The Little Book of the Twelves Promises (the Nine Fridays) (1955)
- The Little Book of Irish Saints (1955)
- The Little Book of Saint Patrick (1957)
- The Little Book of Saint Francis (1958)

Parliament of the United Kingdom
| Preceded by Arthur Lynch | Member of Parliament for Clare West; 1918–1922 | Constituency abolished |
Oireachtas
| New constituency | Teachta Dála for Clare West; 1918–1921 | Constituency abolished |
Party political offices
| Preceded by John J. O'Kelly | President of Sinn Féin; 1931–1933 | Succeeded by Fr. Michael O'Flanagan |

| Dáil | Election | Deputy (Party) | Deputy (Party) | Deputy (Party) | Deputy (Party) | Deputy (Party) |
|---|---|---|---|---|---|---|
| 2nd | 1921 | Éamon de Valera (SF) | Brian O'Higgins (SF) | Seán Liddy (SF) | Patrick Brennan (SF) | 4 seats 1921–1923 |
| 3rd | 1922 | Éamon de Valera (AT-SF) | Brian O'Higgins (AT-SF) | Seán Liddy (PT-SF) | Patrick Brennan (PT-SF) | 4 seats 1921–1923 |
| 4th | 1923 | Éamon de Valera (Rep) | Brian O'Higgins (Rep) | Conor Hogan (FP) | Patrick Hogan (Lab) | Eoin MacNeill (CnaG) |
| 5th | 1927 (Jun) | Éamon de Valera (FF) | Patrick Houlihan (FF) | Thomas Falvey (FP) | Patrick Hogan (Lab) | Patrick Kelly (CnaG) |
| 6th | 1927 (Sep) | Éamon de Valera (FF) | Patrick Houlihan (FF) | Martin Sexton (FF) | Patrick Hogan (Lab) | Patrick Kelly (CnaG) |
| 7th | 1932 | Éamon de Valera (FF) | Seán O'Grady (FF) | Martin Sexton (FF) | Patrick Hogan (Lab) | Patrick Burke (CnaG) |
| 8th | 1933 | Éamon de Valera (FF) | Seán O'Grady (FF) | Patrick Houlihan (FF) | Patrick Hogan (Lab) | Patrick Burke (CnaG) |
| 9th | 1937 | Éamon de Valera (FF) | Seán O'Grady (FF) | Thomas Burke (FP) | Patrick Hogan (Lab) | Patrick Burke (FG) |
| 10th | 1938 | Éamon de Valera (FF) | Seán O'Grady (FF) | Thomas Burke (FP) | Peter O'Loghlen (FF) | Patrick Burke (FG) |
| 11th | 1943 | Éamon de Valera (FF) | Seán O'Grady (FF) | Thomas Burke (FP) | Patrick Hogan (Lab) | Patrick Burke (FG) |
| 12th | 1944 | Éamon de Valera (FF) | Seán O'Grady (FF) | Thomas Burke (FP) | Peter O'Loghlen (FF) | Patrick Burke (FG) |
| 12th | 1945 by-election | Éamon de Valera (FF) | Seán O'Grady (FF) | Thomas Burke (FP) | Peter O'Loghlen (FF) | Patrick Shanahan (FF) |
| 13th | 1948 | Éamon de Valera (FF) | Seán O'Grady (FF) | Thomas Burke (FP) | Patrick Hogan (Lab) | 4 seats 1948–1969 |
| 14th | 1951 | Éamon de Valera (FF) | Patrick Hillery (FF) | William Murphy (FG) | Patrick Hogan (Lab) | 4 seats 1948–1969 |
| 15th | 1954 | Éamon de Valera (FF) | Patrick Hillery (FF) | William Murphy (FG) | Patrick Hogan (Lab) | 4 seats 1948–1969 |
| 16th | 1957 | Éamon de Valera (FF) | Patrick Hillery (FF) | William Murphy (FG) | Patrick Hogan (Lab) | 4 seats 1948–1969 |
| 16th | 1959 by-election | Seán Ó Ceallaigh (FF) | Patrick Hillery (FF) | William Murphy (FG) | Patrick Hogan (Lab) | 4 seats 1948–1969 |
| 17th | 1961 | Seán Ó Ceallaigh (FF) | Patrick Hillery (FF) | William Murphy (FG) | Patrick Hogan (Lab) | 4 seats 1948–1969 |
| 18th | 1965 | Seán Ó Ceallaigh (FF) | Patrick Hillery (FF) | William Murphy (FG) | Patrick Hogan (Lab) | 4 seats 1948–1969 |
| 18th | 1968 by-election | Seán Ó Ceallaigh (FF) | Patrick Hillery (FF) | Sylvester Barrett (FF) | Patrick Hogan (Lab) | 4 seats 1948–1969 |
| 19th | 1969 | Frank Taylor (FG) | Patrick Hillery (FF) | Sylvester Barrett (FF) | 3 seats 1969–1981 | |
| 20th | 1973 | Frank Taylor (FG) | Brendan Daly (FF) | Sylvester Barrett (FF) | 3 seats 1969–1981 | |
| 21st | 1977 | Frank Taylor (FG) | Brendan Daly (FF) | Sylvester Barrett (FF) | 3 seats 1969–1981 | |
| 22nd | 1981 | Madeleine Taylor (FG) | Brendan Daly (FF) | Sylvester Barrett (FF) | Bill Loughnane (FF) | 4 seats since 1981 |
| 23rd | 1982 (Feb) | Donal Carey (FG) | Brendan Daly (FF) | Sylvester Barrett (FF) | Bill Loughnane (FF) | 4 seats since 1981 |
| 24th | 1982 (Nov) | Donal Carey (FG) | Brendan Daly (FF) | Sylvester Barrett (FF) | Madeleine Taylor-Quinn (FG) | 4 seats since 1981 |
| 25th | 1987 | Donal Carey (FG) | Brendan Daly (FF) | Síle de Valera (FF) | Madeleine Taylor-Quinn (FG) | 4 seats since 1981 |
| 26th | 1989 | Donal Carey (FG) | Brendan Daly (FF) | Síle de Valera (FF) | Madeleine Taylor-Quinn (FG) | 4 seats since 1981 |
| 27th | 1992 | Donal Carey (FG) | Moosajee Bhamjee (Lab) | Síle de Valera (FF) | Tony Killeen (FF) | 4 seats since 1981 |
| 28th | 1997 | Donal Carey (FG) | Brendan Daly (FF) | Síle de Valera (FF) | Tony Killeen (FF) | 4 seats since 1981 |
| 29th | 2002 | Pat Breen (FG) | James Breen (Ind.) | Síle de Valera (FF) | Tony Killeen (FF) | 4 seats since 1981 |
| 30th | 2007 | Pat Breen (FG) | Joe Carey (FG) | Timmy Dooley (FF) | Tony Killeen (FF) | 4 seats since 1981 |
| 31st | 2011 | Pat Breen (FG) | Joe Carey (FG) | Timmy Dooley (FF) | Michael McNamara (Lab) | 4 seats since 1981 |
| 32nd | 2016 | Pat Breen (FG) | Joe Carey (FG) | Timmy Dooley (FF) | Michael Harty (Ind.) | 4 seats since 1981 |
| 33rd | 2020 | Violet-Anne Wynne (SF) | Joe Carey (FG) | Cathal Crowe (FF) | Michael McNamara (Ind.) | 4 seats since 1981 |
| 34th | 2024 | Donna McGettigan (SF) | Joe Cooney (FG) | Cathal Crowe (FF) | Timmy Dooley (FF) | 4 seats since 1981 |
