= James Edward O'Doherty =

Irish politician and lawyer

- Born: 1848; Derry, Ireland
- Died: 2 January 1932 (aged 83–84)
- Education: Castleknock, Maynooth
- Occupations: Lawyer, Politician
- Known for: Member of Parliament for North Donegal

James Edward O'Doherty (1848 – 2 January 1932) was an Irish lawyer and politician.

Born in Derry and educated at Castleknock and Maynooth, he won first place in all his Law Society examinations and became a solicitor in 1870.

In the general election of 1885, he was elected Member of Parliament for North Donegal. He remained as member for the constituency until he resigned in 1890. In March 1890, he won an award for libel against the Derry Journal.

== Endnotes ==
Parliament of the United Kingdom
New constituency	Member of Parliament for North Donegal; 1885 – 1890	Succeeded by James Rochfort Maguire
