= Philip O'Doherty =

Philip O'Doherty (1871 – 6 February 1926) was an Irish nationalist politician and Member of Parliament (MP) in the House of Commons of the United Kingdom of Great Britain and Ireland.

He was first elected unopposed as the Irish Parliamentary Party MP for the North Donegal constituency at the 1906 general election. He was re-elected unopposed at the January 1910 and December 1910 general elections. He lost his seat at the 1918 general election.

Parliament of the United Kingdom
Preceded by John Muldoon	Member of Parliament for North Donegal; 1906 – 1918	Succeeded by Joseph O'Doherty
