= List of Sinn Féin MPs =

This is a list of Sinn Féin MPs. It includes all members of Parliament elected to the House of Commons of the United Kingdom representing Sinn Féin. Sinn Féin MPs practice abstentionism regarding the House of Commons and thus do not take their seats.

The article is divided into two sections. MPs elected after 1922 represented constituencies in Northern Ireland only. MPs elected at the 1918 general election or at earlier by-elections were from constituencies in the whole Ireland, during the period of the United Kingdom of Great Britain and Ireland, which ended on the establishment of the Irish Free State in 1922.

== MPs elected since 1922 ==
Member	Constituency	Years served	Source
Gerry Adams	Belfast West	1983–1992, 1997–2011	
Órfhlaith Begley	West Tyrone	2018–present	
Mickey Brady	Newry and Armagh	2015–2024	
Owen Carron	Fermanagh and South Tyrone	1982–1983 (Note: Elected in 1981 as "Anti H-Block/Proxy Political Prisoner"; formally began describing himself as a Sinn Féin MP in 1982.)	
Philip Clarke	Fermanagh and South Tyrone	1955 (Note: Unseated on petition.)	
Pat Cullen	Fermanagh and South Tyrone	2024–present	
Pat Doherty	West Tyrone	2001–2017	
John Finucane	Belfast North	2019–present	
Michelle Gildernew	Fermanagh and South Tyrone	2001–2015; 2017–2024	
Chris Hazzard	South Down	2017–present	
Dáire Hughes	Newry and Armagh	2024–present	
Cathal Mallaghan	Mid Ulster	2024–present	
Elisha McCallion	Foyle	2017–2019	
Barry McElduff	West Tyrone	2017–2018	
Martin McGuinness	Mid Ulster	1997–2013	
Paul Maskey	Belfast West	2011–present	
Tom Mitchell	Mid Ulster	1955 (Note: Disqualified, re-elected, then unseated on petition.)	
Francie Molloy	Mid Ulster	2013–2024	
Conor Murphy	Newry and Armagh	2005–2015	

=== Graphical representation ===
Constituency	1955	56	1982	1983	1992	1997	2001	2005	11	13	2015	2017	18	2019	2024
Fermanagh and South Tyrone	Clarke		Carron				Gildernew					Gildernew			Cullen
Mid Ulster	Mitchell					McGuinness				Molloy					Mallaghan
Belfast West				Adams		Adams			Maskey						
West Tyrone							Doherty					McElduff	Begley		
Newry and Armagh								Murphy			Brady				Hughes
Down South												Hazzard			
Foyle												McCallion			
Belfast North														Finucane	
No. of Sinn Féin MPs	2	0	1	1	0	2	4	5	5	5	4	7	7	7	7

== MPs elected in 1918 or before ==
In alphabetical order:

Name	Seat	Years served	Notes
Robert Barton	West Wicklow	1918 – 1922	
Piaras Béaslaí	East Kerry	1918 – 1922	
Ernest Blythe	North Monaghan	1918 – 1922	
Harry Boland	South Roscommon	1918 – 1922	Died 2 August 1922
Cathal Brugha	County Waterford	1918 – 1922	Died 7 July 1922
Donal Buckley	North Kildare	1918 – 1922	
Séamus Burke	Mid Tipperary	1918 – 1922	
J. J. Clancy	North Sligo	1918 – 1922	
Michael Colivet	Limerick City	1918 – 1922	
Con Collins	West Limerick	1918 – 1922	
Michael Collins	South Cork	1918 – 1922	Died 22 August 1922
W. T. Cosgrave	North Kilkenny	1918 – 1922	
W. T. Cosgrave	Kilkenny City	1917 – 1918	
James Crowley	North Kerry	1918 – 1922	
John Crowley	North Mayo	1918 – 1922	
Bryan Cusack	North Galway	1918 – 1922	
Éamon de Valera	East Clare	1917 – 1922	
Éamon de Valera	East Mayo	1918 – 1922	
Liam de Róiste	Cork City	1918 – 1922	
James Dolan	County Leitrim	1918 – 1922	
George Gavan Duffy	South Dublin	1918 – 1922	
Eamonn Duggan	South Meath	1918 – 1922	
Seán Etchingham	East Wicklow	1918 – 1922	
Frank Fahy	South Galway	1918 – 1922	
Desmond FitzGerald	Dublin Pembroke	1918 – 1922	
Peter Paul Galligan	West Cavan	1918 – 1922	
Laurence Ginnell	County Westmeath	1918 – 1922	
Arthur Griffith	East Cavan	1918 – 1922	Died 12 August 1922
Arthur Griffith	North West Tyrone	1918 – 1922	Died 12 August 1922
Richard Hayes	East Limerick	1918 – 1922	
Seán Hayes	West Cork	1918 – 1922	
Thomas Hunter	North East Cork	1918 – 1922	
Thomas Kelly	Dublin St Stephen's Green	1918 – 1922	
David Kent	East Cork	1918 – 1922	
Frank Lawless	North Dublin	1918 – 1922	Died 16 April 1922
James Lennon	County Carlow	1918 – 1922	
Diarmuid Lynch	South East Cork	1918 – 1922	
Fionán Lynch	South Kerry	1918 – 1922	
Joseph MacBride	West Mayo	1918 – 1922	
Alexander McCabe	South Sligo	1918 – 1922	
Pierce McCan	East Tipperary	1918 – 1919	Died 6 March 1919
Patrick McCartan	King's County	1918 – 1922	
Patrick McCartan	King's County Tullamore	April – Dec 1918	
Joseph MacDonagh	North Tipperary	1918 – 1922	
Seán MacEntee	South Monaghan	1918 – 1922	
Joseph McGrath	Dublin St James's	1918 – 1922	
Joseph McGuinness	County Longford	1918 – 1922	Died 31 May 1922
Joseph McGuinness	South Longford	1917 – 1918	
Eoin MacNeill	Londonderry City	1918 – 1922	
Eoin MacNeill	National University	1918 – 1922	
Terence MacSwiney	Mid Cork	1918 – 1920	Died 25 October 1920
Constance Markievicz	Dublin St Patrick's	1918 – 1922	
Liam Mellows	East Galway	1918 – 1922	
Liam Mellows	North Meath	1918 – 1922	
P. J. Moloney	South Tipperary	1918 – 1922	
Richard Mulcahy	Dublin Clontarf	1918 – 1922	
Art O'Connor	South Kildare	1918 – 1922	
Joseph O'Doherty	North Donegal	1918 – 1922	
Brian O'Higgins	West Clare	1918 – 1922	
Kevin O'Higgins	Queen's County	1918 – 1922	
Patrick O'Keeffe	North Cork	1918 – 1922	
John J. O'Kelly	County Louth	1918 – 1922	
Seán T. O'Kelly	Dublin College Green	1918 – 1922	
Seán O'Mahony	South Fermanagh	1918 – 1922	
Pádraic Ó Máille	Galway Connemara	1918 – 1922	
James O'Mara	South Kilkenny	1918 – 1922	
George Noble Plunkett	North Roscommon	1917 – 1922	
James Ryan	South Wexford	1918 – 1922	
William Sears	South Mayo	1918 – 1922	
Philip Shanahan	Dublin Harbour	1918 – 1922	
Austin Stack	West Kerry	1918 – 1922	
Michael Staines	Dublin St Michan's	1918 – 1922	
Joseph Sweeney	West Donegal	1918 – 1922	
Roger Sweetman	North Wexford	1918 – 1922	
J. J. Walsh	Cork City	1918 – 1922	
Peter J. Ward	South Donegal	1918 – 1922	

- By-elections were not held to fill the seats of those MPs who died before the 1922 UK general election, nor in the cases of individuals elected for more than one constituency.
