= 2024 United Kingdom general election in Northern Ireland =

- 4 July 2024

All 18 Northern Ireland seats to the House of Commons
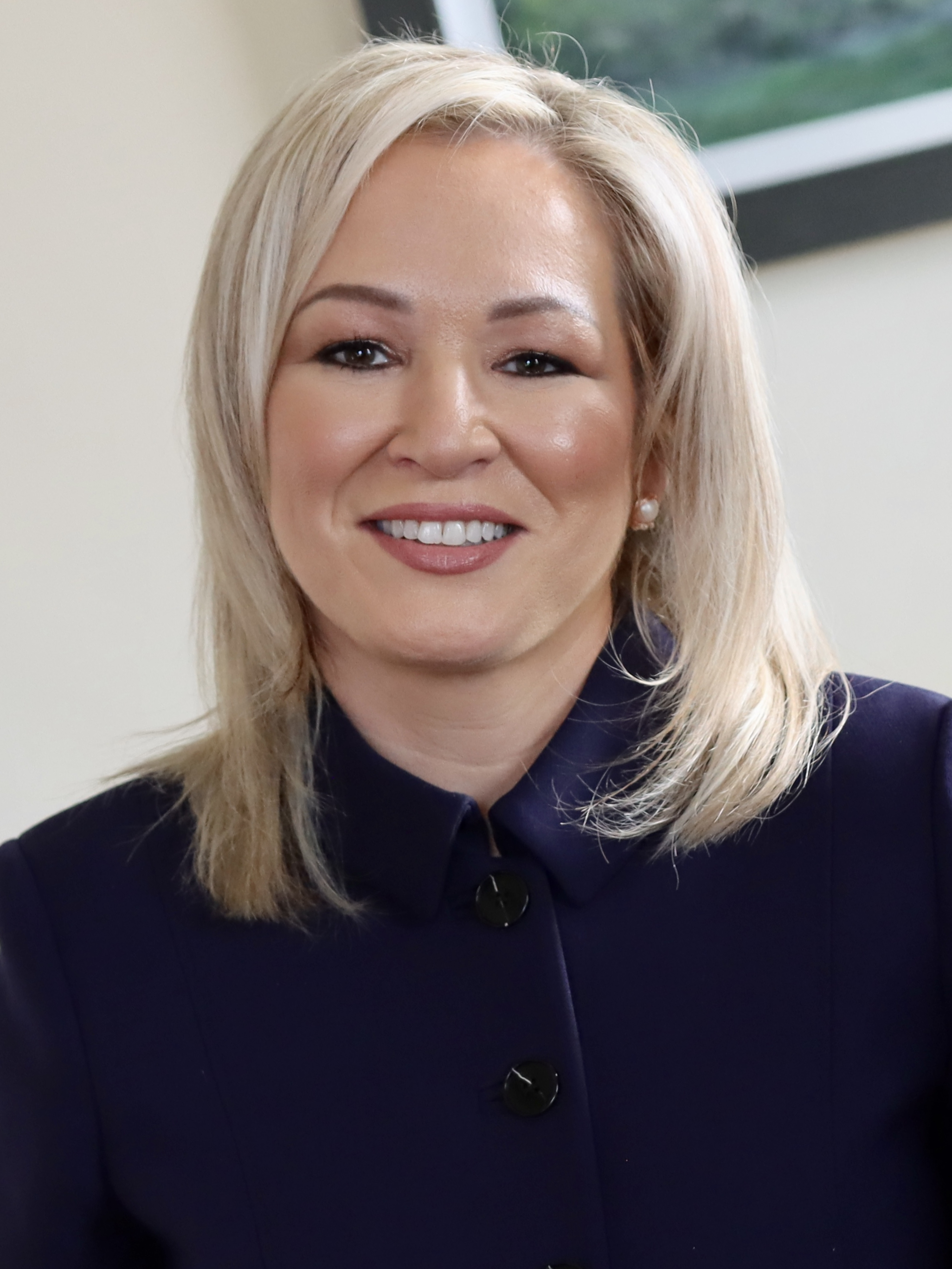

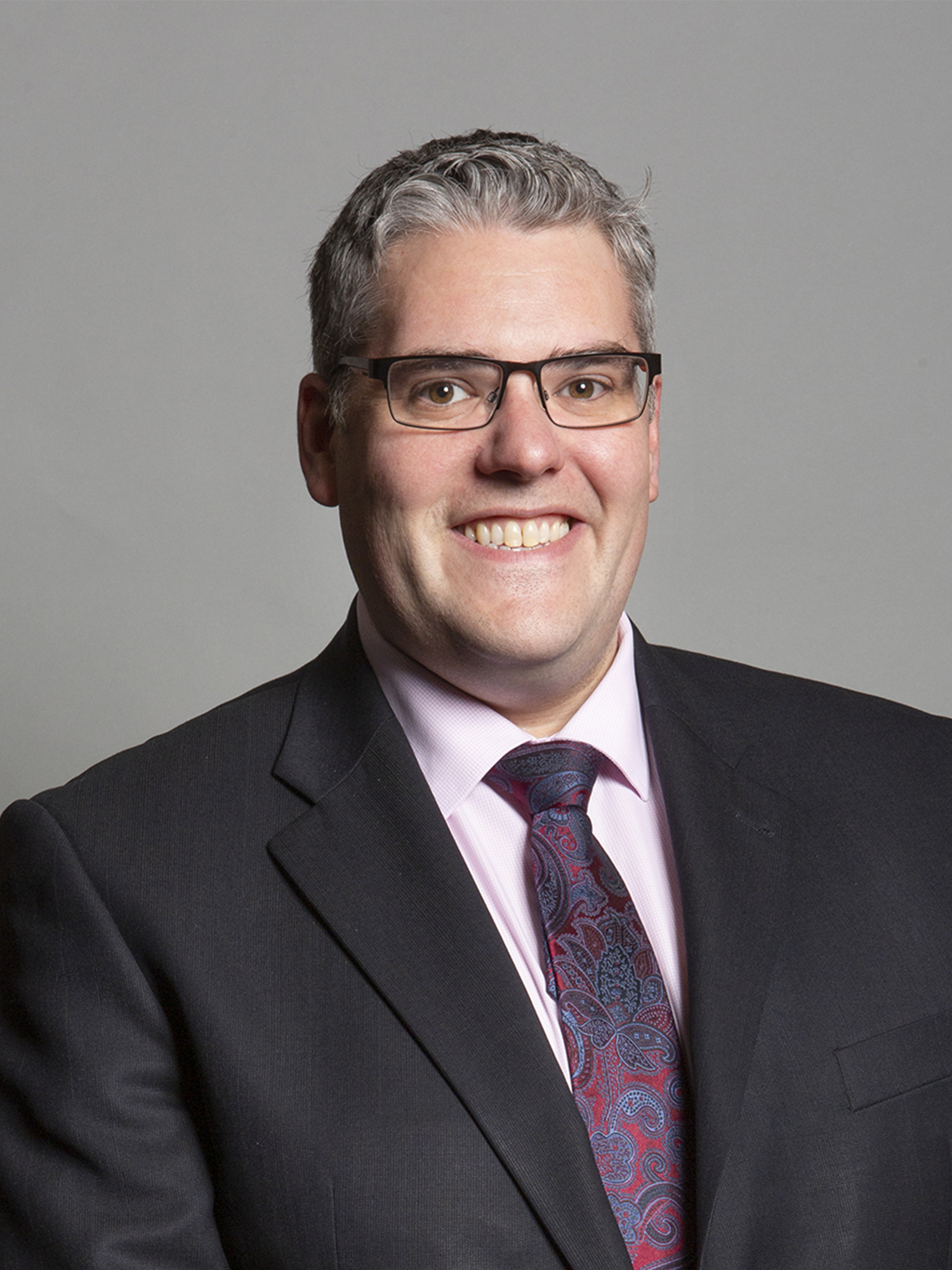

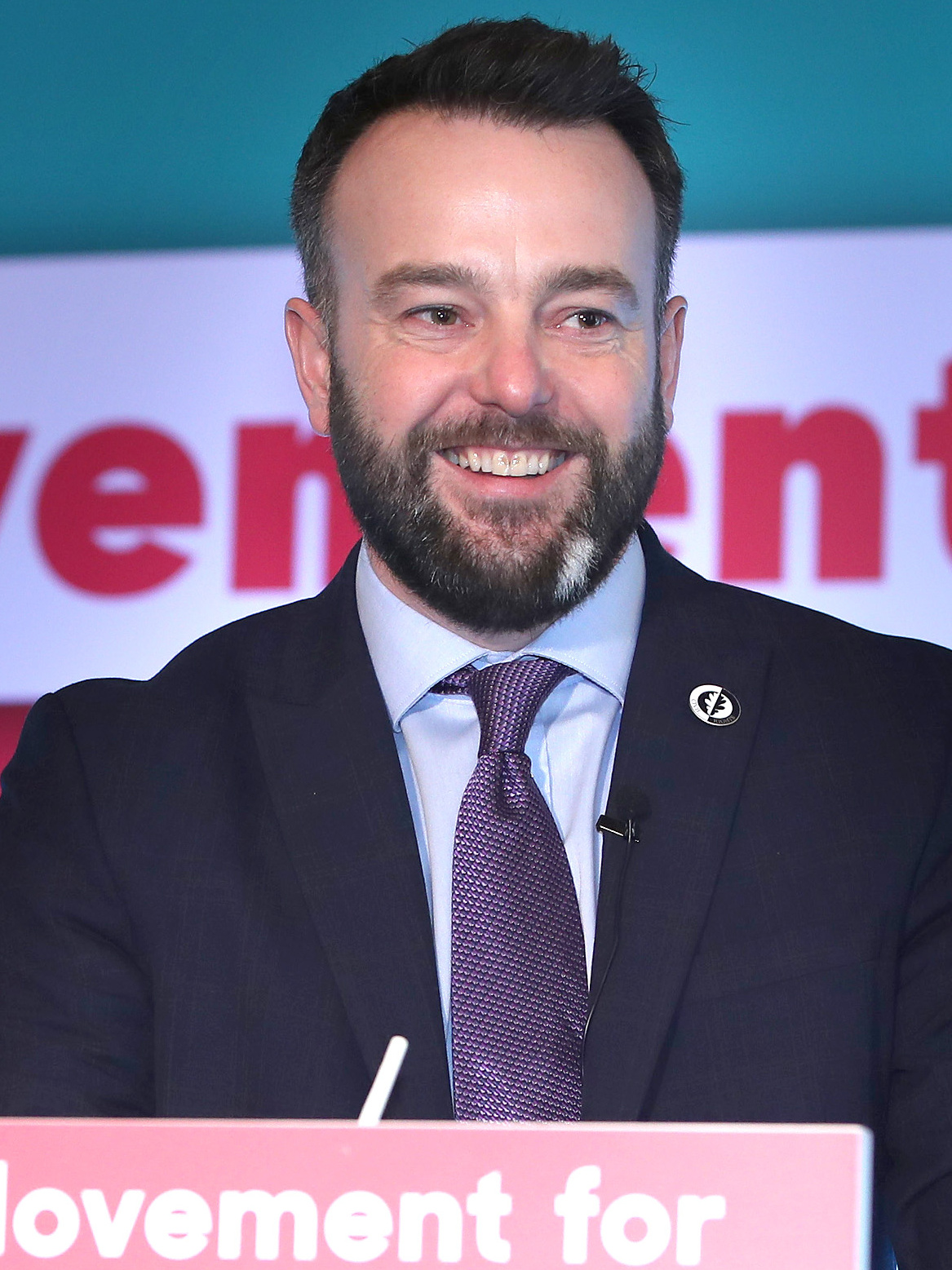

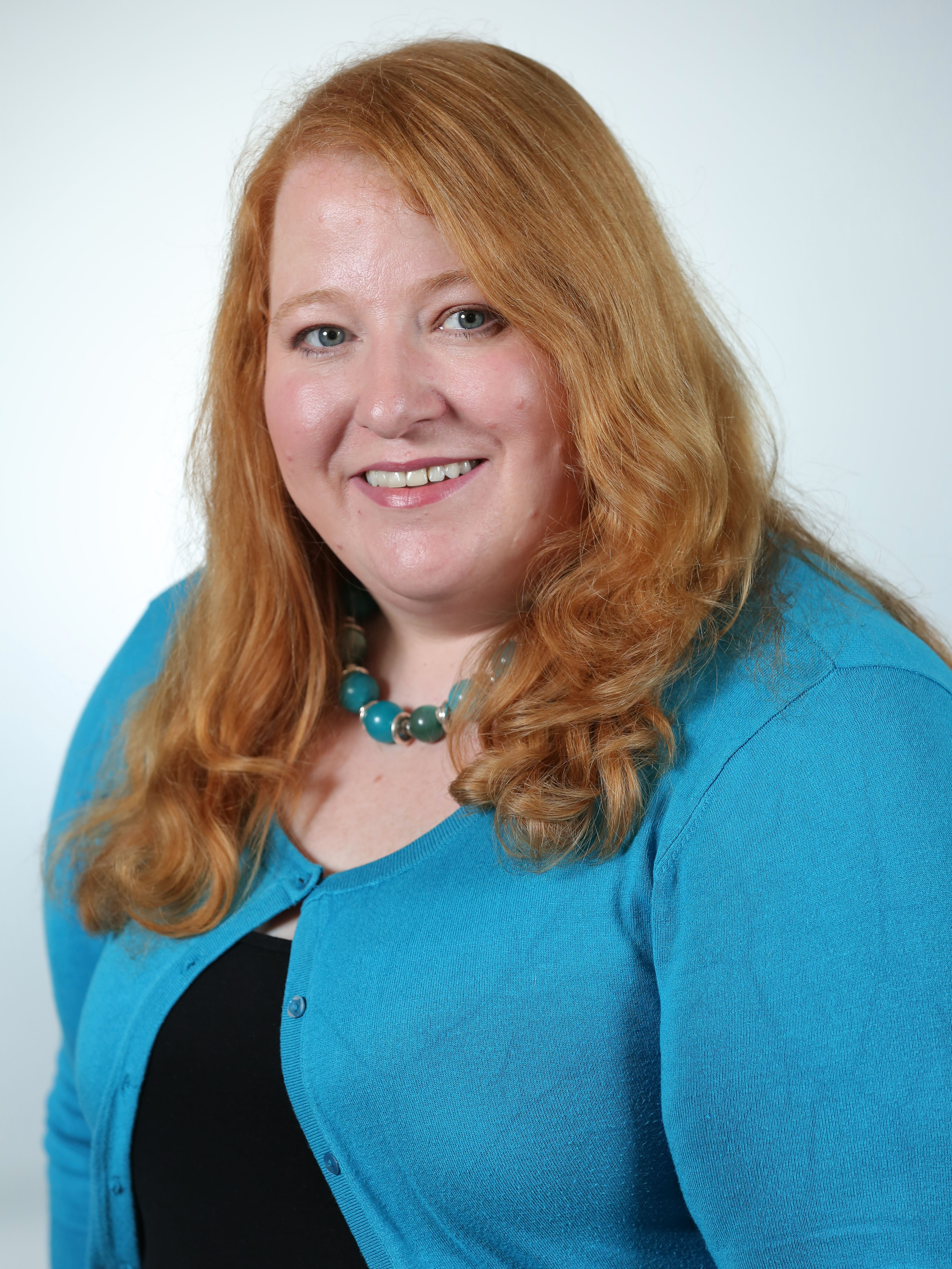

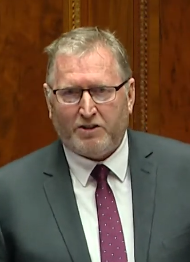

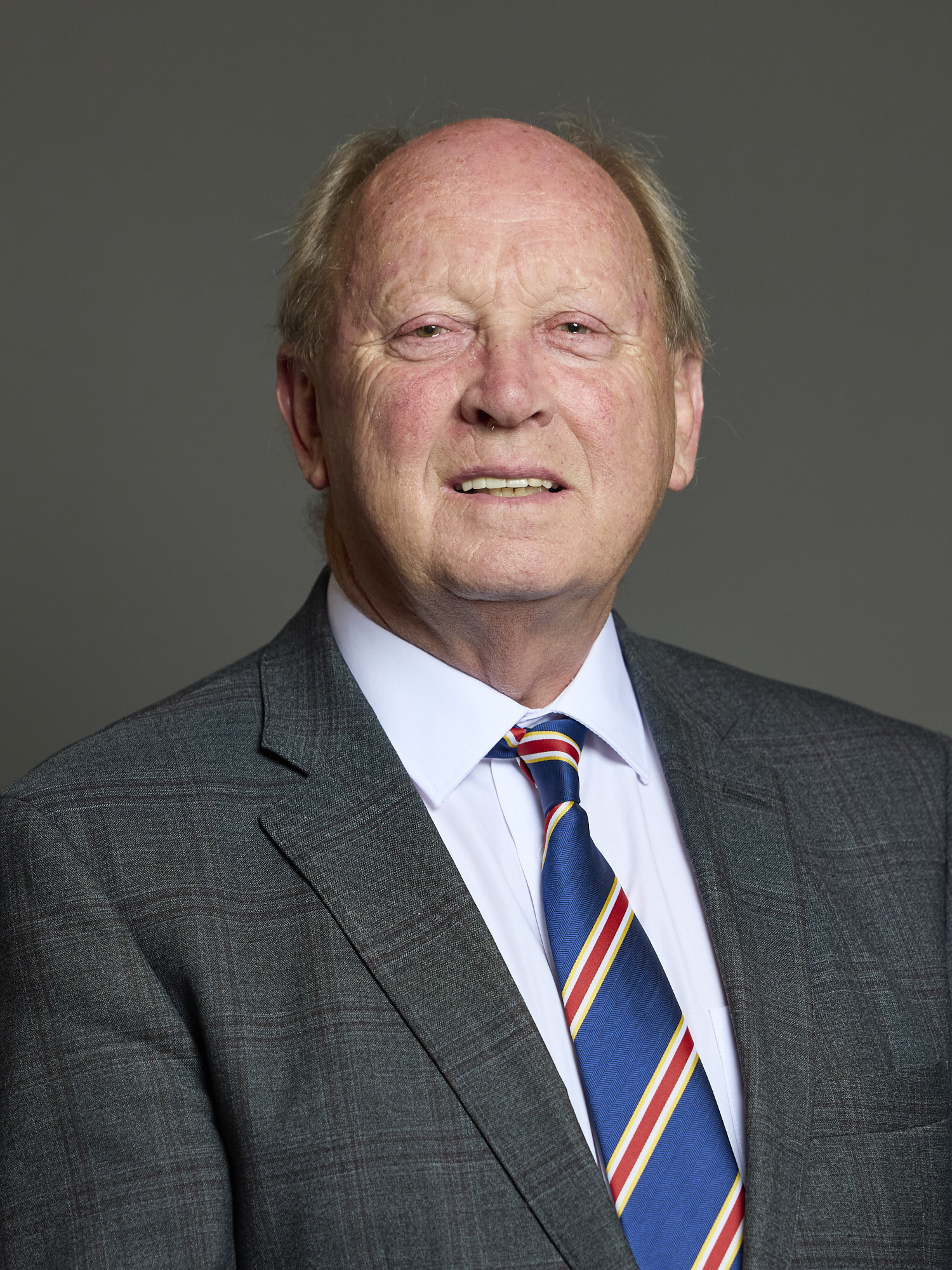
	First party	Second party	Third party
Leader	Michelle O'Neill (Note: "Party leader in the North" and vice president of Sinn Féin. Mary Lou McDonald is the party president and leader of the opposition in the Dáil of the Republic of Ireland.)	Gavin Robinson	Colum Eastwood
Party	Sinn Féin	DUP	SDLP
Leader since	23 January 2017 (Note: As "Party leader in the North")	29 May 2024	14 November 2015
Leader's seat	Did not stand (Note: MLA for Mid Ulster)	Belfast East	Foyle
Last election	22.8%, 7 MPs	30.6%, 8 MPs	14.9%, 2 MPs
Seats won	7	5	2
Seat change	Steady	▼3	Steady
Popular vote	210,891	172,058	86,861
Percentage	27.0%	22.1%	11.1%
Swing	▲4.2%	▼8.5%	▼3.8%
	Fourth party	Fifth party	Sixth party
Leader	Naomi Long	Doug Beattie	Jim Allister
Party	Alliance	UUP	TUV
Leader since	26 October 2016	17 May 2021	7 December 2007
Leader's seat	Ran in Belfast East (lost) (Note: MLA for Belfast East. She previously represented the area at Westminster from 2010-2015.)	Did not stand (Note: MLA for Upper Bann)	Ran in North Antrim (won) (Note: He was MLA for North Antrim prior to the election.)
Last election	16.8%, 1 MP	11.7%, 0 MPs	Did not contest
Seats won	1	1	1
Seat change	Steady	▲1	▲1
Popular vote	117,191	94,779	48,685
Percentage	15.0%	12.2%	6.2%
Swing	▼1.8%	▲0.5%	▲6.2%
- Results by constituencies

On 4 July 2024, the 2024 United Kingdom general election was held in Northern Ireland, to elect all 650 members of the House of Commons, including the 18 Northern Ireland seats.

The general election occurred after the recently completed constituency boundaries review.

== Background ==
=== Electoral system ===
MPs are elected in 18 single-member constituencies by first-past-the-post.

=== Date of the election ===
On 22 May 2024, Prime Minister Rishi Sunak announced 4 July 2024 as the election date.

=== Constituency boundaries ===
Map of the 18 constituencies to be used.

In June 2023, it was published that The Boundary Commission for Northern Ireland had made final recommendations for the new boundaries for Northern Ireland's 18 parliamentary constituencies. The report was submitted to the speaker of the UK House of Commons and the UK Government was required to submit a draft of an Order in Council to activate the new boundaries within four months. Changes include:

- Belfast South became Belfast South and Mid Down, and incorporates some areas formerly part of Strangford or Lagan Valley.
- East Antrim now includes some areas that were previously in North Antrim.
- Foyle was reduced in size, with areas incorporated into the constituencies of West Tyrone and East Londonderry.
- Strangford was expanded to include large swathes of the eastern side of South Down.

Ten wards were moved and as approved by MPs, the new boundaries became effective on 1 November 2023. These changes were approved at a meeting of the Privy Council on 15 November and came into force on 29 November.

== Campaign ==
In the run up to the election, there was speculation to the extent at which unionist electoral pacts would be active in some constituencies. In July 2023, Ulster Unionist Party (UUP) leader Doug Beattie clarified that his party intends to stand candidates in 17 constituencies, but there was still speculation about whether the Traditional Unionist Voice (TUV) would field candidates. The TUV leader Jim Allister said that in seats held by non-unionists where the sitting MP could potentially be ousted, it would support an "agreed single unionist candidate".

In North Down, there were calls for unionist parties to drop their own candidates and unite behind a single contender to defeat incumbent Alliance MP Stephen Farry. Farry was confirmed as Alliance's candidate for North Down on 26 November 2023. On 24 January 2024, the UUP selected former Iraq War veteran Tim Collins as their candidate for North Down, with the UUP leader Doug Beattie saying his party "does not do pacts". Independent Unionist MLA Alex Easton announced his candidacy for the seat on 25 April 2024.

In October 2023 the Alliance Party of Northern Ireland revealed that they intended to target Lagan Valley, seat of the then-leader of the Democratic Unionist Party (DUP) Jeffrey Donaldson. They unveiled their candidate as Sorcha Eastwood and required a 7.16% swing to gain the seat from the DUP.

Amongst majority nationalist constituencies, due to their strong performance in the 2022 Assembly election and the 2023 local elections, Sinn Féin look "likely to increase its number of seats at Westminster", with the possibility of gaining Social Democratic and Labour Party (SDLP) leader Colum Eastwood's seat of Foyle.

The campaign got underway in South Belfast and North Down, with both incumbent MPs, Claire Hanna and Stephen Farry seeking re-election. North Down Ulster Unionist candidate Tim Collins said he was "very confident" of unseating Farry.

In January 2024, the Ulster Unionist Party selected their former leader and Minister of Health Robin Swann as their candidate for South Antrim and announced their deputy leader, Robbie Butler, as the party's candidate for Lagan Valley.

On 16 March 2024, the Traditional Unionist Voice formed an electoral pact with Reform UK, in which the two parties would stand mutually agreed candidates within Northern Ireland. On 24 May they announced that they were supporting Alex Easton, the Independent Unionist candidate in North Down, and would not stand a candidate in that constituency.

The leader of the Green Party Northern Ireland, Sen. Mal O'Hara, told Slugger O'Toole on 26 April 2024 that they would stand in every constituency and would not pursue any electoral pacts.

On 7 May 2024, the UUP announced that 19 year-old Jay Basra, who is Punjabi-British, would be their candidate for Mid Ulster. Following the announcement, Basra was the target of racial abuse on social media. The abuse was condemned by UUP leader Doug Beattie and former First Minister Arlene Foster, as well as deputy First Minister Emma Little-Pengelly.

Jeffrey Donaldson, who was the DUP leader until March 2024, appeared in court on 3 July to face additional sex offence charges.

== Candidates ==
=== By affiliation ===
Affiliation	Number of candidates
Alliance Party of Northern Ireland	18
Social Democratic and Labour Party	18
Ulster Unionist Party	17
Democratic Unionist Party	16
Sinn Féin	14
Traditional Unionist Voice	14
Green Party Northern Ireland	11
Aontú	10
Independents	9 (in 7 constituencies)
Northern Ireland Conservatives	5
People Before Profit	3
Cross-Community Labour Alternative	1
Total	136

=== By constituency ===
Constituency	Sinn Féin	DUP	Alliance	UUP	SDLP	TUV	Green	Aontú	Others	Incumbent	
Belfast East		Gavin Robinson	Naomi Long	Ryan Warren	Séamas de Faoite	John Ross	Brian Smyth		Ryan North (Independent)	DUP	Gavin Robinson
Belfast North	John Finucane	Phillip Brett	Nuala McAllister		Carl Whyte	David Clarke	Mal O'Hara		Fiona Ferguson (PBP)	SF	John Finucane
Belfast South and Mid Down		Tracy Kelly	Kate Nicholl	Michael Henderson	Claire Hanna	Dan Boucher	Áine Groogan			SDLP	Claire Hanna
Belfast West	Paul Maskey	Frank McCoubrey	Eóin Millar	Ben Sharkey	Paul Doherty	Ann McClure	Ash Jones	Gerard Herdman	Gerry Carroll (PBP); Tony Mallon (Independent)	SF	Paul Maskey
East Antrim	Oliver McMullan	Sammy Wilson	Danny Donnelly	John Stewart	Margaret Anne McKillop	Matthew Warwick	Mark Bailey			DUP	Sammy Wilson
East Londonderry	Kathleen McGurk	Gregory Campbell	Richard Stewart	Glenn Miller	Cara Hunter	Allister Kyle	Jen McCahon	Gemma Brolly	Claire Scull (Conservative)	DUP	Gregory Campbell
Fermanagh and South Tyrone	Pat Cullen		Eddie Roofe	Diana Armstrong	Paul Blake			Carl Duffy	Gerry Cullen (CCLA)	SF	Michelle Gildernew
Foyle	Sandra Duffy	Gary Middleton	Rachael Ferguson	Janice Montgomery	Colum Eastwood			John Boyle	Shaun Harkin (PBP); Anne McCloskey (Independent)	SDLP	Colum Eastwood
Lagan Valley		Jonathan Buckley	Sorcha Eastwood	Robbie Butler	Simon Lee	Lorna Smyth	Patricia Denvir			Independent (elected as DUP)	Jeffrey Donaldson
Mid Ulster	Cathal Mallaghan	Keith Buchanan	Padraic Farrell	Jay Basra	Denise Johnston	Glenn Moore		Alixandra Halliday	John Kelly (Independent)	SF	Francie Molloy
Newry and Armagh	Dáire Hughes	Gareth Wilson	Helena Young	Sam Nicholson	Pete Byrne	Keith Ratcliffe		Liam Reichenberg	Samantha Rayner (Conservative)	SF	Mickey Brady
North Antrim	Philip McGuigan	Ian Paisley Jr	Sian Mulholland	Jackson Minford	Helen Maher	Jim Allister		Ráichéal Mhic Niocaill	Tristan Morrow (Independent)	DUP	Ian Paisley Jr
North Down			Stephen Farry	Tim Collins	Déirdre Vaughan		Barry McKee		Alex Easton (Independent); Chris Carter (Independent)	APNI	Stephen Farry
South Antrim	Declan Kearney	Paul Girvan	John Blair	Robin Swann	Roisin Lynch	Mel Lucas	Lesley Veronica	Siobhan McErlean		DUP	Paul Girvan
South Down	Chris Hazzard	Diane Forsythe	Andrew McMurray	Michael O'Loan	Colin McGrath	Jim Wells	Declan Walsh	Rosemary McGlone	Hannah Westropp (Conservative)	SF	Chris Hazzard
Strangford	Noel Sands	Jim Shannon	Michelle Guy	Richard Smart	Will Polland	Ron McDowell	Alexandra Braidner		Gareth Burns (Independent); Garreth Falls (Independent); Barry Hetherington (Conservative)	DUP	Jim Shannon
Upper Bann	Catherine Nelson	Carla Lockhart	Eóin Tennyson	Kate Evans	Malachy Quinn					DUP	Carla Lockhart
West Tyrone	Órfhlaith Begley	Tom Buchanan	Stephen Donnelly	Matthew Bell	Daniel McCrossan	Stevan Patterson		Leza Houston	Stephen Lynch (Conservative)	SF	Órfhlaith Begley

== Opinion polling ==
Date(s) conducted	Pollster	Client	Sample size	DUP	SF	Alliance	SDLP	UUP	TUV	Others	Lead
7 Jul 2024	2024 general election		–	22.1%	27.0%	15.0%	11.1%	12.2%	6.2%	6.4%	4.9
24–25 Jun 2024	LucidTalk	Belfast Telegraph	3,859	21%	23%	18%	14%	13%	4%	7%: 1% People Before Profit; 1% Greens; 1% Aontú; 4% Independents and others	2
8–10 Jun 2024	LucidTalk	Belfast Telegraph	3,634	21%	24%	17%	13%	12%	5%	8%: 1% People Before Profit; 1% Greens; 1% Aontú; 5% Independents and others	3
10–13 May 2024	LucidTalk	Belfast Telegraph	3,316	20%	26%	15%	10%	13%	8%	8%: 2% Aontú; 1% People Before Profit; 1% Greens; 4% Independents and others	6
28 Jan – 11 Feb 2024	Social Market Research	Irish News–University of Liverpool	1,206	23.5%	31.1%	15.2%	8.1%	11.1%	4.8%	–	6.6
26 Oct – 3 Nov 2023	Social Market Research	Institute of Irish Studies	1,074	25%	31%	15%	9%	11%	5%	5%	6
14 Jan – 7 Sep 2023	Northern Ireland Life and Times Survey (Note: The question asked was "If there were a general election tomorrow, which political party do you think you would be most likely to support?".)	ARK	1,200	19%	24%	28%	9%	13%	–	9%: Greens on 5%; Others on 4%	4
12 Dec 2019	2019 general election		–	30.6%	22.8%	16.8%	14.9%	11.7%	N/A	3.2%	7.8

== Projections ==
Final projections of number of seats
Source	Date	DUP	SF	SDLP	APNI	UUP	TUV	Ind.	Others
Electoral Calculus	4 July	7	7	2	1	1	0	0	0
Bunker Consulting Group	1 July	6	7	2	2	1	0	0	0
Ireland Votes	25 May	5	7	2	1	1	1	1	0

=== Leadership approval ratings ===
==== Michelle O'Neill ====
The following polls asked about voters' opinions on Michelle O'Neill, the First Minister of Northern Ireland since 3 February 2024, Vice President of Sinn Féin since 10 February 2018 and Deputy First Minister of Northern Ireland from 11 January 2020 to 4 February 2022.

Date(s) conducted	Pollster	Client	Sample size	Good/great	Bad/awful	Don't know	Net approval
11–14 Aug 2023	LucidTalk	Belfast Telegraph	2,950	43%	37%	20%	+6%
21–24 Apr 2023	LucidTalk	Belfast Telegraph	3,957	41%	37%	22%	+4%
20–23 Jan 2023	LucidTalk	Belfast Telegraph	1,449	41%	40%	19%	+1%
4–7 Nov 2022	LucidTalk	Belfast Telegraph	3,351	46%	37%	17%	+9%
12–15 Aug 2022	LucidTalk	Belfast Telegraph	3,384	40%	42%	18%	–2%

==== Jeffrey Donaldson ====
The following polls asked about voters' opinions on Jeffrey Donaldson, the leader of the Democratic Unionist Party (DUP) from 30 June 2021 to 29 March 2024.

Date(s) conducted	Pollster	Client	Sample size	Good/great	Bad/awful	Don't know	Net approval
11–14 Aug 2023	LucidTalk	Belfast Telegraph	2,950	24%	66%	10%	−42%
21–24 Apr 2023	LucidTalk	Belfast Telegraph	3,957	27%	65%	8%	−38%
20–23 Jan 2023	LucidTalk	Belfast Telegraph	1,449	25%	63%	12%	−38%
4–7 Nov 2022	LucidTalk	Belfast Telegraph	3,351	29%	65%	6%	−36%
12–15 Aug 2022	LucidTalk	Belfast Telegraph	3,384	27%	64%	9%	−37%

==== Naomi Long ====
The following polls asked about voters' opinions on Naomi Long, the leader of the Alliance Party since 26 October 2016.

Date(s) conducted	Pollster	Client	Sample size	Good/great	Bad/awful	Don't know	Net approval
11–14 Aug 2023	LucidTalk	Belfast Telegraph	2,950	38%	39%	23%	−1%
21–24 Apr 2023	LucidTalk	Belfast Telegraph	3,957	40%	38%	22%	+2%
20–23 Jan 2023	LucidTalk	Belfast Telegraph	1,449	37%	38%	25%	−1%
4–7 Nov 2022	LucidTalk	Belfast Telegraph	3,351	45%	37%	18%	+8%
12–15 Aug 2022	LucidTalk	Belfast Telegraph	3,384	46%	37%	17%	+9%

==== Doug Beattie ====
The following polls asked about voters' opinions on Doug Beattie, the leader of the Ulster Unionist Party (UUP) since 27 May 2021.

Date(s) conducted	Pollster	Client	Sample size	Good/great	Bad/awful	Don't know	Net approval
11–14 Aug 2023	LucidTalk	Belfast Telegraph	2,950	34%	38%	28%	−4%
21–24 Apr 2023	LucidTalk	Belfast Telegraph	3,957	38%	33%	29%	+5%
20–23 Jan 2023	LucidTalk	Belfast Telegraph	1,449	28%	42%	30%	−14%
4–7 Nov 2022	LucidTalk	Belfast Telegraph	3,351	37%	32%	31%	+5%
12–15 Aug 2022	LucidTalk	Belfast Telegraph	3,384	34%	34%	32%	0%

==== Colum Eastwood ====
The following polls asked about voters' opinions on Colum Eastwood, the leader of the Social Democratic and Labour Party (SDLP) since 14 November 2015.

Date(s) conducted	Pollster	Client	Sample size	Good/great	Bad/awful	Don't know	Net approval
11–14 Aug 2023	LucidTalk	Belfast Telegraph	2,950	26%	43%	31%	−17%
21–24 Apr 2023	LucidTalk	Belfast Telegraph	3,957	32%	40%	28%	−8%
20–23 Jan 2023	LucidTalk	Belfast Telegraph	1,449	33%	38%	29%	−5%
4–7 Nov 2022	LucidTalk	Belfast Telegraph	3,351	31%	39%	30%	−8%
12–15 Aug 2022	LucidTalk	Belfast Telegraph	3,384	34%	39%	27%	–5%

==== Jim Allister ====
The following polls asked about voters' opinions on Jim Allister, the leader of Traditional Unionist Voice (TUV) since 7 December 2007.

Date(s) conducted	Pollster	Client	Sample size	Good/great	Bad/awful	Don't know	Net approval
11–14 Aug 2023	LucidTalk	Belfast Telegraph	2,950	23%	63%	14%	−40%
21–24 Apr 2023	LucidTalk	Belfast Telegraph	3,957	27%	61%	12%	−34%
20–23 Jan 2023	LucidTalk	Belfast Telegraph	1,449	27%	57%	16%	−30%
4–7 Nov 2022	LucidTalk	Belfast Telegraph	3,351	27%	59%	14%	−32%
12–15 Aug 2022	LucidTalk	Belfast Telegraph	3,384	31%	54%	15%	−23%

=== Leadership performance ratings ===
The following poll asked respondents to rate the performance of political leaders in the last few months, scoring from 0% to 100% for each leader.

==== NI political leaders ====
Date(s) conducted	Pollster	Client	Sample size	Gavin Robinson^{DUP leader}	Michelle O'Neill^{Sinn Féin VP: NI First Minister}	Naomi Long^{Alliance leader}	Colum Eastwood^{SDLP leader}	Doug Beattie^{UUP leader}	Jim Allister^{TUV leader}	Emma Little-Pengelly^{(DUP) NI deputy First Minister}	NI Executive
10–13 May 2024	LucidTalk	Belfast Telegraph	3,316	46%	53%	46%	39%	44%	29%	52%	39%

==== UK and Ireland political leaders ====
Date(s) conducted	Pollster	Client	Sample Size	Simon Harris^{Taoiseach Ireland}	Mary Lou McDonald^{Sinn Féin President}	Chris Heaton-Harris^{NI Secretary of State}	Rishi Sunak^{UK Prime Minister}
10–13 May 2024	LucidTalk	Belfast Telegraph	3,316	36%	39%	20%	16%

== MPs not seeking re-election ==
MP	Constituency	First elected	Party	Date announced
Francie Molloy	Mid Ulster	2013	Sinn Féin	13 February 2024
Mickey Brady	Newry and Armagh	2015	Sinn Féin	19 February 2024
Jeffrey Donaldson	Lagan Valley	1997	DUP (Note: Suspended in March 2024.)	22 May 2024
Michelle Gildernew	Fermanagh and South Tyrone	2001	Sinn Féin	23 May 2024

== Results ==
=== By affiliation ===
Affiliate	Seats					Aggregate votes		
Affiliate	Total	Gains	Losses	Net +/-	Of all (%)	Total	Of all (%)	Difference
Sinn Féin	7	0	0	Steady	38.9	210,891	27.0	▲4.2
DUP	5	0	3	▼3	27.8	172,058	22.1	▼8.5
SDLP	2	0	0	Steady	11.1	86,861	11.1	▼3.8
Alliance	1	1	1	Steady	5.6	117,191	15.0	▼1.8
UUP	1	1	0	▲1	5.6	94,779	12.2	▲0.5
TUV	1	New		▲1	5.6	48,685	6.2	New
Independent	1	1	0	▲1	5.6	23,602	3.1	▲2.8
Green (NI)	0	0	0	Steady	0.0	8,692	1.1	▲0.9
People Before Profit	0	0	0	Steady	0.0	8,438	1.1	▲0.2
Aontú	0	0	0	Steady	0.0	7,466	1.0	▼0.2
Labour Alternative	0	Did not stand in 2019			0.0	624	0.1	—N/a
NI Conservatives	0	0	0	Steady	0.0	553	0.1	▼0.6
Total	18	—N/a		Steady	100%	779,840	57.3	▼4.5

=== By constituency ===
Constituency	2019 seat	2024 seat					Votes									Turnout
Constituency	2019 seat	Affiliate	Candidate	Votes	Share	Majority	SF	DUP	APNI	UUP	SDLP	TUV	Ind.	Other	Total	Turnout
Belfast East	DUP	DUP	Gavin Robinson	19,894	46.6%	2,676	—N/a	19,894	17,218	1,818	619	1,918	162	1,077	42,706	58.6%
Belfast North	SF	SF	John Finucane	17,674	43.7%	5,612	17,674	12,062	4,274	—N/a	1,413	2,877	—N/a	2,152	40,452	54.5%
Belfast South and Mid Down	SDLP	SDLP	Claire Hanna	21,345	49.1%	12,506	—N/a	6,859	8,839	2,653	21,345	2,218	—N/a	1,577	43,491	58.0%
Belfast West	SF	SF	Paul Maskey	21,009	52.9%	15,961	21,009	4,304	1,077	461	4,318	2,010	161	6,403	39,743	53.0%
East Antrim	DUP	DUP	Sammy Wilson	11,462	28.9%	1,306	2,986	11,462	10,156	9,476	892	4,135	—N/a	568	39,675	54.1%
East Londonderry	DUP	DUP	Gregory Campbell	11,506	27.9%	179	11,327	11,506	3,734	3,412	5,260	4,363	—N/a	1,675	41,277	55.0%
Fermanagh and South Tyrone	SF	SF	Pat Cullen	24,844	48.6%	4,571	24,844	—N/a	2,420	20,273	2,386	—N/a	—N/a	1,153	51,076	65.6%
Foyle	SDLP	SDLP	Colum Eastwood	15,647	40.8%	4,166	11,481	3,915	1,268	1,422	15,647	—N/a	1,519	3,106	38,358	52.0%
Lagan Valley	DUP	APNI	Sorcha Eastwood	18,618	37.9%	2,959	—N/a	15,659	18,618	11,157	1,028	2,186	—N/a	433	49,081	59.7%
Mid Ulster	SF	SF	Cathal Mallaghan	24,085	53.0%	14,923	24,085	9,162	2,001	2,269	3,722	2,978	181	1,047	45,445	61.4%
Newry and Armagh	SF	SF	Dáire Hughes	22,299	48.5%	15,493	22,299	5,900	2,692	3,175	6,806	4,099	—N/a	971	45,942	59.1%
North Antrim	DUP	TUV	Jim Allister	11,642	28.3%	450	7,714	11,192	4,488	3,901	1,661	11,642	136	451	41,185	55.0%
North Down	APNI	Ind.	Alex Easton	20,913	48.3%	7,305	—N/a	—N/a	13,608	6,754	657	—N/a	20,913	1,364	43,296	59.0%
South Antrim	DUP	UUP	Robin Swann	16,311	38.0%	7,512	8,034	8,799	4,574	16,311	1,589	2,693	—N/a	908	42,908	56.0%
South Down	SF	SF	Chris Hazzard	19,698	43.5%	9,280	19,698	7,349	3,187	1,411	10,418	1,893	—N/a	1,287	45,243	59.0%
Strangford	DUP	DUP	Jim Shannon	15,559	40.0%	5,131	2,793	15,559	10,428	3,941	1,783	3,143	413	849	38,909	52.2%
Upper Bann	DUP	DUP	Carla Lockhart	21,642	45.7%	7,406	14,236	21,642	6,322	3,662	1,496	—N/a	—N/a	—N/a	47,358	58.0%
West Tyrone	SF	SF	Órfhlaith Begley	22,711	52.0%	15,917	22,711	6,794	2,287	2,683	5,821	2,530	—N/a	869	43,692	59.0%
All constituencies							210,891	172,058	117,191	94,779	86,861	48,685	23,485	25,890	779,840	57.1%
All constituencies							27.1%	22.1%	15.0%	12.2%	11.1%	6.3%	3.0%	3.3%	100.0%	
All constituencies							Seats									
All constituencies							7	5	1	1	2	1	1	0	18	
All constituencies							39%	28%	5.6%	5.6%	11%	5.6%	5.6%	0.0%	100.0%	

=== Seats by affiliate share ===
Seats
Sinn Féin	38.9%
DUP	27.8%
SDLP	11.1%
Alliance	5.6%
UUP	5.6%
TUV	5.6%
Independent unionists	5.6%

== Analysis ==
Sinn Féin became the largest Northern Ireland party in the House of Commons for the first time, following similar success in the 2022 Assembly election and 2023 local election. Sinn Féin defended their seven seats with an increased majority in each, South Down, Belfast North and especially Fermanagh and South Tyrone are less marginal than they were in 2019. Sinn Féin also came very close to gaining East Londonderry, Kathleen McGurk was the runner-up just 179 votes behind the DUP. Sinn Féin also narrowed the SDLP's majority in Foyle.

The DUP won five seats, three less than in 2019, this was the lowest number of DUP MPs since 2001 and since the DUP became the largest unionist party. The DUP lost Lagan Valley to Alliance, South Antrim to the UUP and North Antrim to the TUV. The loss of North Antrim by just 450 votes is particularly notable, the DUP had held this seat for its entire existence, and between them Ian Paisley and Ian Paisley Jr had represented this constituency for 54 years since 1970. The majorities of Sammy Wilson in East Antrim and especially Gregory Campbell in East Londonderry, were significantly reduced, both were narrowly held against challenges from Alliance by 1,306 votes and Sinn Féin by 179 votes respectively. A more positive result for the DUP was the re-election of new leader Gavin Robinson in Belfast East with a slightly increased majority, the DUP also held Strangford and Upper Bann.

The SDLP held their two seats. In Foyle SDLP leader Colum Eastwood's majority was reduced from 17,110 to 4,166, mainly due to lower turnout although there was a swing to Sinn Féin. Claire Hanna was also re-elected to the new Belfast South and Mid Down constituency with a slightly reduced majority of 12,506, this is now the fifth safest seat in Northern Ireland after Sinn Féin's four safest seats. Outside of these two constituencies the SDLP vote mainly decreased, with Belfast West a notable exception. The SDLP was the runner-up in South Down and Newry and Armagh, both were previously SDLP held seats but are increasingly safe for Sinn Féin.

Alliance remains the third largest party in Northern Ireland in terms of vote share, as it was in the 2022 Assembly election and 2023 local election. Alliance gained Lagan Valley from the DUP, with Sorcha Eastwood becoming the third directly elected Alliance MP. Alliance also lost North Down, with independent unionist Alex Easton gaining from Alliance deputy leader Stephen Farry, the party leader Naomi Long also lost in Belfast East, Long was the previous MP for Belfast East from 2010 to 2015. Alliance came a particularly close second in East Antrim, and was also runner-up in Strangford and in Belfast South and Mid Down for the first time since 1987. In other constituencies the Alliance vote was generally down slightly from their peak in 2019, but higher than any previous elections.

The UUP gained a seat in the House of Commons for the first time since 2015, with the election of Robin Swann in South Antrim, Swann achieved the highest majority in South Antrim since 1997 (7,512). The UUP was runner-up in one other constituency, Fermanagh and South Tyrone, which the party had last won in 2015, although Diana Armstrong was the sole unionist candidate the increase in the Sinn Féin vote ensured the seat remained a Sinn Féin hold. As with Alliance, the UUP's second best prospect in this election was East Antrim, fewer than 2,000 votes separated the top three candidates.

The TUV gained a seat in the House of Commons for the first time, with Jim Allister gaining North Antrim from the DUP by 450 votes. Beyond North Antrim the TUV's strongest constituencies were East Londonderry, East Antrim and Strangford. The other MP elected in Northern Ireland was independent unionist Alex Easton in North Down who gained the seat from Alliance, Easton left the DUP in 2021 and he is the fourth North Down MP to have been elected either as an independent or with a smaller unionist party after leaving the DUP or UUP.

== See also ==
- Elections in Northern Ireland
- Next Northern Ireland Assembly election
- 2024 United Kingdom general election in England
- 2024 United Kingdom general election in Scotland
- 2024 United Kingdom general election in Wales
- List of marginal seats before the 2024 United Kingdom general election
