= 1911 East Wicklow by-election =

UK Parliamentary by-election

The 1911 East Wicklow by-election was held on 13 July 1911. The by-election was held due to the resignation of the incumbent Irish Parliamentary MP, John Muldoon, in order to contest a by-election in East Cork. It was won by the Irish Parliamentary candidate Anthony Donelan, who was unopposed.
