= Reform UK–TUV alliance =

Political alliance in Northern Ireland

- Leader: Nigel Farage; Jim Allister
- Deputy Leader: Richard Tice: Ron McDowell
- Founded: 16 March 2024
- Ideology: National conservatism; Social conservatism; British unionism; Euroscepticism; Right-wing populism
- Political position: Right-wing
- Member parties: Reform UK; Traditional Unionist Voice (TUV)
- Colours: Turquoise; Blue

The Reform UK–TUV alliance was an electoral pact for the 2024 United Kingdom general election in Northern Ireland between the right-wing Reform UK party and the British unionist and national conservative Traditional Unionist Voice (TUV). The parties agreed to stand mutually agreed candidates in 14 constituencies in Northern Ireland.

== History ==
The alliance between the two parties was formed after Northern Ireland's largest unionist party, the Democratic Unionist Party (DUP), decided to re-enter the devolved power-sharing government at Stormont, ending their boycott over the Northern Ireland Protocol on 3 February 2024. This led the TUV to denounce the DUP as "Protocol implementers." Former Reform UK MEP Ben Habib had previously launched a legal challenge against the NI Protocol alongside TUV leader Jim Allister in February 2021.

There was speculation that the alliance could lead to a splitting of the unionist vote, resulting in fewer DUP MPs being elected due to the first-past-the-post electoral system used for Westminster elections. The DUP MP for East Antrim, Sammy Wilson, highlighted this in a critical statement following the formation of the alliance, which he described as "absurd" and "self-destructive".

The TUV applied to run candidates as "TUV/Reform UK" on ballot papers for the July 2024 general election, but this was rejected by the Electoral Office. Instead, the candidates appeared under a joint Reform UK–TUV logo.

On 3 June 2024, Nigel Farage replaced Richard Tice as the leader of Reform UK. Farage subsequently distanced himself from the alliance, and on 10 June, indicated that the pact would come to an end with his endorsement of DUP MPs Ian Paisley Jr and Sammy Wilson. Farage stated that "new leadership brings change" and that he wished the TUV well. Jim Allister called the move "disappointing". Allister stated that the TUV had entered the alliance in "good faith", and that Farage's move went against a previous conversation they had a week prior. Following Farage's personal endorsement, Wilson called upon the TUV to drop the alliance branding.

Reform UK confirmed its continued support for the electoral pact in a media statement, stating that Farage was giving his own "personal view," and that he has not dissolved the electoral pact nor intended to do so.

== After the election ==
In the 2024 general election, Reform UK won 5 seats and the TUV won 1 seat in Northern Ireland.

After talks, Allister, the sole TUV MP, chose not to take the Reform UK whip, but to support Reform UK in some areas (including Brexit arrangements for Northern Ireland, taxation and immigration) as set out in a memorandum of understanding.

In June 2025, it was reported that Reform UK is exploring the possibility of organising in Northern Ireland, where it has more than 1,000 members, including setting up branches and contesting elections. Such a move could cause issues for the TUV, which would be competing for the same right-wing unionist vote. Reform UK MP Robert Jenrick stated in March 2026 that the party is “not picking sides in the Unionist cause” and wanted to support the unionist parties, suggesting that Reform UK will not contest the 2027 Northern Ireland Assembly election despite its previous interest.

== Results ==
District	Candidate	Votes	%	Place
Belfast East	John Ross	1,918	4.5%	3rd of 7
Belfast North	David Clarke	2,877	7.1%	4th of 7
Belfast South and Mid Down	Dan Boucher	2,218	5.1%	5th of 6
Belfast West	Ann McClure	2,010	5.1%	5th of 10
East Antrim	Matthew Warwick	4,135	10.4%	4th of 7
East Londonderry	Allister Kyle	4,363	10.6%	4th of 9
Lagan Valley	Lorna Smyth	2,186	4.5%	4th of 6
Mid Ulster	Glenn Moore	2,978	6.6%	4th of 8
Newry and Armagh	Keith Ratcliffe	4,099	8.9%	4th of 8
North Antrim	Jim Allister	11,642	28.3%	1st of 8 Elected
South Antrim	Mel Lucas	2,693	6.3%	5th of 8
South Down	Jim Wells	1,893	4.2%	5th of 9
Strangford	Ron McDowell	3,143	8.1%	4th of 10
West Tyrone	Stevan Patterson	2,530	5.8%	5th of 8
Source: House of Commons Library

== See also ==
- 2024 United Kingdom general election in Northern Ireland
- Ulster Conservatives and Unionists
