= William John Lane =

Irish nationalist politician (born 1849)

William John Lane (born August 1849) was an Irish nationalist politician. A member of Cork Corporation in 1884, he was elected at the 1885 general election as the Member of Parliament (MP) for the newly created Eastern division of County Cork. Lane was re-elected unopposed in 1886, but did not stand again at the 1892 general election. He was a member of the Irish Parliamentary Party until 1891 when he sided with the Anti-Parnellite majority, joining the Irish National Federation.

He was married to an American, Frances Mary Armstrong of Brooklyn, New York City.

Parliament of the United Kingdom
New constituency	Member of Parliament for East Cork; 1885 – 1892	Succeeded by Anthony Donelan
