= 1907 East Wicklow by-election =

UK Parliamentary by-election

The 1907 East Wicklow by-election was held on 29 July 1907. The by-election was held due to the resignation of the incumbent Irish Parliamentary MP, Denis Joseph Cogan. It was won by the Irish Parliamentary candidate the previous MP for North Donegal, John Muldoon, who was unopposed.
