= Philip Clarke (politician) =

Philip Christopher Clarke (15 April 1933 – 6 July 1995) was an Irish business consultant and competitive cyclist, who had been an Irish Republican Army member in the 1950s. As a cyclist, he competed in the first two Rás Tailteann races, and represented Ireland internationally. In 1954 he was imprisoned after an IRA raid on a British Army barracks in Northern Ireland, and the following year he was elected to the British parliament as the Sinn Féin MP for Fermanagh and South Tyrone; as he was imprisoned, his election was overturned on petition. He was released from prison in 1958, after which he broke his ties with the IRA. In later life, he worked for the Irish Management Institute and as an independent business consultant

== Early life ==
Clarke was born in Long Island, New York, and moved with his family to Dublin in 1936. He joined the Irish civil service in 1950, and joined the Irish Republican Army shortly afterwards. In October 1954, he was arrested and imprisoned after an attempted IRA raid on a British Army barracks in Omagh, County Tyrone. He was sentenced to ten years' imprisonment.

== Sporting career ==
Clarke was a member of the James' Gate Cycling Club, a Dublin club affiliated to the nationalist-leaning National Cycling Association. (At the time, Irish cycling was split between the NCA, which asserted its right to represent all of Ireland, and the Cumann Rothaiochta na hÉireann, which limited its scope to the Republic of Ireland.) He represented Ireland internationally, though due to the lack of international recognition of the NCA, his opportunities here were limited. He competed in the Rás Tailteann races in 1953 and 1954. During his imprisonment, in 1955–58, he was acknowledged as competitor #1 "who will not be riding".

In 1953, he and his friend Colm Christle had cycled through France and Switzerland to Italy to watch the UCI Road World Championship, and in later years he visited Europe every year to see the Tour de France or another major race.

== Political career ==
In the 1955 UK General Election, Clarke was elected MP for the Fermanagh and South Tyrone constituency, winning 30,529 votes, and becoming the youngest MP at the time. As Clarke was in prison at the time of his election, serving ten years for a treason felony, his opponent, Lieutenant Colonel Robert Grosvenor, lodged a petition to have him unseated.

The case appeared before the Northern Ireland High Court in August 1955. On 2 September, the court ruled that Clarke was ineligible for election and his Unionist opponent was declared duly elected.

== Subsequent life ==
When the hierarchy of the Roman Catholic Church in Ireland issued an explicit condemnation of IRA violence in January 1956, Clarke severed his connections with the IRA. He petitioned for remission of his sentence in 1958, and was released from jail on 18 December 1958 after the Governor of Northern Ireland Lord Wakehurst exercised his prerogative of mercy.

He had been suggested by Sinn Féin as a candidate for Dublin South West in the 1957 Irish general election, but resisted due to disagreement with party policy.

He rejoined the Civil Service, and later took up a post as a lecturer at the Irish Management Institute. He married in April 1960. At the Irish Management Institute, he rose to become an executive director, but fell out with the institute after a change of policy in the 1970s. He left to form his own business consulting firm, specialising in industrial relations and gain sharing.

Clarke died in Dublin on 6 July 1995.

== See also ==
- List of Sinn Féin MPs
- List of United Kingdom MPs with the shortest service

Parliament of the United Kingdom
Preceded by Cahir Healy	Member of Parliament for Fermanagh and South Tyrone; 1955	Succeeded by Robert Grosvenor
Preceded by John Woollam	Baby of the House; 1955	Succeeded by Peter Kirk
