= Anthony Donelan =

British Army officer and politician (1846–1924)

Anthony John Charles Donelan (1846 – 12 September 1924) was a soldier and Irish nationalist politician. He was a Member of Parliament (MP) for East Cork from 1892 to 1910, and for East Wicklow from 1911 to 1918.

Donelan came from an Irish Protestant landlord family who had extensive property and a strong military tradition. His father was Colonel of the 48th Regiment, and his grandfather was killed in action at the Battle of Talavera in the Peninsular War. His mother was Sarah, daughter of John Johnson of Holbeach, Lincolnshire. Donelan was educated privately and at the Royal Military College, Sandhurst, and was commissioned into the Norfolk Regiment, being stationed for some time at Corfu.

He was elected unopposed at East Cork as an MP for the Anti-Parnellite Irish National Federation in the 1892 general election and 1895, taking his seat in the House of Commons in the Parliament of the United Kingdom of Great Britain and Ireland. He continued to be elected unopposed as a Nationalist in the general elections 1900, 1906 and January 1910, after the reunification of the Irish Parliamentary Party in 1900. However, in December 1910 election he was opposed by William O'Brien, whose All-for-Ireland Party was strong in County Cork. Although Donelan defeated O'Brien by 3,173 votes to 1,834, he was unseated following an election petition. He then swapped seats with John Muldoon at East Wicklow, Donelan and Muldoon both being returned unopposed at by-elections in July 1911.

For many years Donelan was Chief Whip of the Irish Party. He retired from Parliament at the 1918 general election. His funeral at Midleton, County Cork, on Sunday 14 September 1924 was attended by thousands of people.

== Sources ==
- Dod's Parliamentary Companion
- Irish Times, 13 and 15 September 1924
- The Times (London), 17 September 1924
- Brian M. Walker (ed.), Parliamentary Election Results in Ireland, 1801–1922, Dublin, Royal Irish Academy, 1978
- "Donelan, Capt. Anthony John Charles" . Thom's Irish Who's Who . Dublin: Alexander Thom and Son Ltd. 1923. p. 64 – via Wikisource.

Parliament of the United Kingdom
Preceded by William John Lane	Member of Parliament for East Cork; 1892 – 1911	Succeeded by John Muldoon
Preceded by John Muldoon	Member of Parliament for East Wicklow; 1911 – 1918	Succeeded by Seán Etchingham
