= Denis Joseph Cogan =

Irish politician

Denis Joseph Cogan (c. 1858 – 18 January 1944) was an Irish businessman, politician and Member of Parliament (MP) in the Parliament of the United Kingdom of Great Britain and Ireland from 1900 to 1907.

Born in County Wicklow to Denis Cogan, a farmer, Cogan played a prominent part in the commercial life of Dublin and Wicklow. He was a former member of Dublin Corporation.

In 1886, he married Elizabeth Murphy, of Larage Bridge, Wicklow.

He was elected to the House of Commons as MP for East Wicklow at the 1900 general election, until he resigned his seat on 10 June 1907, triggering the 1907 East Wicklow by-election.

Cogan became a member of Dublin Chamber of Commerce in 1907 and was elected its president in 1932. He remained a member of the Council of the Chamber until his death.

A director of Hibernian Fire and General Insurance from its foundation in 1908, Cogan was chairman of the board for two decades until his death.

He was also well known in horseracing circles as an owner and breeder.

He died at his residence at Lyndhurst, Tivoli Terrace, Dún Laoghaire.

Parliament of the United Kingdom
Preceded by William Joseph Corbet	Member of Parliament for East Wicklow; 1900 – 1907	Succeeded by John Muldoon
