= John Muldoon (politician) =

Irish barrister and nationalist politician

John Muldoon (11 July 1865 – 21 November 1938) was an Irish barrister and nationalist politician. He was a Member of Parliament (MP) for most of the period between 1905 and 1918, representing three different constituencies in the House of Commons of the United Kingdom of Great Britain and Ireland.

== Early life ==
Muldoon was the third son of James Muldoon of Dromore, County Tyrone, and of Catherine Gahan. He was educated at a local school, at Queen's College, Galway and at the King's Inns. He was called to the Irish Bar in 1894 and became a King's Counsel (KC) in 1913. In 1903 he married Olive, daughter of Charles Whamond of Westport, County Mayo.

== Political career ==
Muldoon was a treasurer of the United Irish League and a Director of the Freeman's Journal. He was returned unopposed as MP for the Irish Parliamentary Party in North Donegal at a by-election in June 1905 but did not stand again at the general election of January 1906, being deselected by the local clergy. In July 1907 he was elected unopposed at a by-election for East Wicklow, and was re-elected at both general elections of 1910, unopposed in January 1910 and by almost two to one over a Unionist in the December 1910 election. In July 1911 he resigned and stood for the East Cork seat of fellow Nationalist Captain A. J. C. Donelan, who had been unseated following an election petition, having defeated William O'Brien the previous December. Donelan succeeded Muldoon unopposed in East Wicklow, while Muldoon was in the event returned unopposed in East Cork.

Muldoon was politically very active from 1900 to 1914. His particular interests were the Local Government (Ireland) Act 1898, the Land Acts and the Labourers (Ireland) Act 1906, on all of which he published a number of works. He was a close political confidant of John Dillon, while said to be close to John Redmond and Joseph Devlin.

Muldoon retired from politics at the 1918 general election. In 1921 he was appointed Registrar in Lunacy and five years later, after the establishment of the Irish Free State, as Registrar in the office of the Chief Justice of Ireland, retiring in 1935.

== Sources ==
- Dod's Parliamentary Companion, 1912
- Ferguson, Kenneth (ed.), King's Inns Barristers, 1868–2004, Dublin, Honorable Society of King's Inns in association with the Irish Legal History Society, 2005
- Irish Times, Obituary of John Muldoon K.C., 22 November 1938
- Maume, Patrick, The Long Gestation: Irish Nationalist Life 1891-1918, Dublin, Gill & MacMillan, 1999
- Walker, Brian M. (ed.), Parliamentary Election Results in Ireland, 1801-1922, Dublin, Royal Irish Academy, 1978

== Publications ==
- A Guide to Irish Local Government, (with George McSweeny), Dublin, Eason & Son, 1898
- Local Government Rules and Orders, Dublin, Eason & Son, 1899
- A Guide to the Election of County and Rural District Councillors in Ireland, Dublin, Eason & Son, 1902
- Old Age Pensions in Ireland, Dublin, Eason & Co., 1908
- For Ireland's Sake; or, Under the Green Flag, A romantic Irish drama, Dublin, E. Ponsonby, 1910
- The Story of a "Rigged Convention", Dublin, 1915

Parliament of the United Kingdom
Preceded by William O'Doherty	Member of Parliament for North Donegal; 1905 – 1906	Succeeded by Philip O'Doherty
Preceded by Denis Joseph Cogan	Member of Parliament for East Wicklow; 1907 – 1911	Succeeded by Anthony Donelan
Preceded by Anthony Donelan	Member of Parliament for East Cork; 1911 – 1918	Succeeded by David Kent
