= 1911 East Cork by-election =

UK Parliamentary by-election

The 1911 East Cork by-election was held on 15 July 1911. The by-election was held due to the election being declared void of the incumbent Irish Parliamentary MP, Anthony Donelan. It was won by the Irish Parliamentary candidate John Muldoon.
