= East Wicklow =

Former parliamentary constituency in the United Kingdom

- Former county constituency for the House of Commons

1885–1922
- Seats: 1
- Created from: County Wicklow
- Replaced by: Kildare–Wicklow

East Wicklow, a division of County Wicklow, was a parliamentary constituency in Ireland, represented in the Parliament of the United Kingdom. From 1885 to 1922 it returned one Member of Parliament (MP) to the House of Commons of the United Kingdom of Great Britain and Ireland.

Until the 1885 general election the area was part of the County Wicklow constituency. From 1922 it was not represented in the UK Parliament, as it was no longer in the UK.

== Boundaries ==
This constituency comprised the eastern part of County Wicklow. In 1918, the boundary of the constituency was expanded to include that part of the Bray urban district transferred from County Dublin to County Wicklow under the 1898 Local Government (Ireland) Act.

1885–1918: The baronies of Arklow, Newcastle and Rathdown, and that part of the barony of Ballinacor North contained within the parish of Calary.

1918–1922: The existing East Wicklow constituency, together with that part of the existing South Dublin constituency contained within the administrative county of Wicklow.

== Members of Parliament ==
Election	Member	Party
1885	William Joseph Corbet	Nationalist
1890	William Joseph Corbet	National League (Parnellite)
1892	John Sweetman	National Federation (Anti-Parnellite)
1895	Edward Peter O'Kelly	National Federation (Anti-Parnellite)
1895	William Joseph Corbet	National League (Parnellite)
1900	Denis Joseph Cogan	Nationalist
1907	John Muldoon	Nationalist
1911	Anthony Donelan	Nationalist
1918	Seán Etchingham	Sinn Féin
1922	UK constituency abolished	

== Elections ==
=== Elections in the 1880s ===
1885 general election: East Wicklow
Party	Candidate	Votes	%	±%
Irish Parliamentary	William Joseph Corbet	3,385	77.2	
Irish Conservative	George Tottenham	1,000	22.8	
Majority		2,385	54.4	
Turnout		4,385	78.7	
Registered electors		5,569		
Irish Parliamentary win (new seat)				

1886 general election: East Wicklow
Party	Candidate	Votes	%	±%
Irish Parliamentary	William Joseph Corbet	3,101	75.9	−1.3
Irish Conservative	George Tottenham	984	24.1	+1.3
Majority		2,117	51.8	−2.6
Turnout		4,085	73.4	−5.3
Registered electors		5,569		
Irish Parliamentary hold		Swing	−1.3	

=== Elections in the 1890s ===
1892 general election: East Wicklow
Party	Candidate	Votes	%	±%
Irish National Federation	John Sweetman	1,433	38.0	N/A
Irish Unionist	Robert Halpin	1,225	32.5	+8.4
Irish National League	William Joseph Corbet	1,115	29.6	−46.3
Majority		208	5.5	N/A
Turnout		3,773	82.3	+8.9
Registered electors		4,583		
Irish National Federation gain from Irish Parliamentary		Swing		

Sweetman resigns to re-stand as a Parnellite Nationalist, prompting a by-election.

By-election, 1895: East Wicklow
Party	Candidate	Votes	%	±%
Irish National Federation	Edward Peter O'Kelly	1,253	34.7	−3.3
Irish National League	John Sweetman	1,191	33.0	+3.4
Irish Unionist	George Tottenham	1,165	32.3	−0.2
Majority		62	1.7	−3.8
Turnout		3,609	80.9	−1.4
Registered electors		4,461		
Irish National Federation hold		Swing	−3.4	

1895 general election: East Wicklow
Party	Candidate	Votes	%	±%
Irish National League	William Joseph Corbet	1,295	35.7	+6.1
Irish Unionist	George Tottenham	1,208	33.3	+0.8
Irish National Federation	Francis Arthur O'Keeffe	1,127	31.0	−7.0
Majority		87	2.4	N/A
Turnout		3,630	81.4	−0.9
Registered electors		4,461		
Irish National League gain from Irish National Federation		Swing	+2.7	

=== Elections in the 1900s ===
1900 general election: East Wicklow
Party	Candidate	Votes	%	±%
Irish Parliamentary	Denis Joseph Cogan	Unopposed		
Registered electors		4,827		
Irish Parliamentary hold				

1906 general election: East Wicklow
Party	Candidate	Votes	%	±%
Irish Parliamentary	Denis Joseph Cogan	Unopposed		
Registered electors		4,954		
Irish Parliamentary hold				

Cogan resigns, causing a by-election.

By-election, 1907: East Wicklow
Party	Candidate	Votes	%	±%
Irish Parliamentary	John Muldoon	Unopposed		
Registered electors		4,991		
Irish Parliamentary hold				

=== Elections in the 1910s ===
January 1910 general election: East Wicklow
Party	Candidate	Votes	%	±%
Irish Parliamentary	John Muldoon	Unopposed		
Registered electors		4,710		
Irish Parliamentary hold				

December 1910 general election: East Wicklow
Party	Candidate	Votes	%	±%
Irish Parliamentary	John Muldoon	2,384	65.2	N/A
Irish Unionist	Hugh Melville Howard	1,275	34.8	New
Majority		1,109	30.4	N/A
Turnout		3,659	77.7	N/A
Registered electors		4,710		
Irish Parliamentary hold		Swing	N/A	

Muldoon resigns, prompting a by-election.

By-election, 1911: East Wicklow
Party	Candidate	Votes	%	±%
Irish Parliamentary	Anthony Donelan	Unopposed		
Registered electors		4,875		
Irish Parliamentary hold				

1918 general election: East Wicklow
Party	Candidate	Votes	%	±%
Sinn Féin	Seán Etchingham	5,916	53.9	New
Irish Unionist	Alexander Parker Keene	2,600	23.7	−11.1
Irish Parliamentary	Denis Joseph Cogan	2,466	22.4	−42.8
Majority		3,316	30.2	N/A
Turnout		10,982	72.1	−5.6
Registered electors		15,241		
Sinn Féin gain from Irish Parliamentary		Swing		
