= Seán Etchingham =

Irish politician (1870–1923)

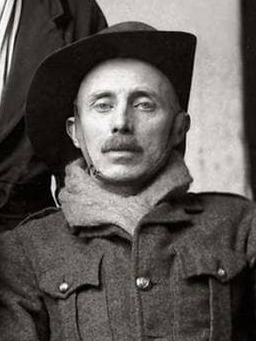
- Etchingham in 1916

Secretary for Fisheries
- In office 2 April 1919 – 9 January 1922
- Preceded by: New office
- Succeeded by: Fionán Lynch

Teachta Dála
- In office May 1921 – June 1922
- Constituency: Wexford
- In office December 1918 – May 1921
- Constituency: East Wicklow

Personal details
- Born: John Redmond Hutchingham; 27 March 1868 Courtown, County Wexford, Ireland
- Died: 23 April 1923 (aged 55)
- Party: Sinn Féin
- Occupation: Journalist

Seán Redmond Etchingham (27 March 1868 – 23 April 1923) was an Irish Sinn Féin politician.

He was born in the townland of Ballintray, Courtown, County Wexford, one of five children of John Etchingham, described as a coachman, servant or butler, and Elizabeth (Bessie) Redmond, both of whom were also from County Wexford. Like four of his siblings, his surname was recorded as Hutchingham in the birth register, although the family is referred to as Etchingham in most official documents.

In 1901, he was living in Church Lane, Gorey, where he was employed as a horse trainer. By 1911, he was back in Courtown, where he gave his profession as journalist in the census of that year.

He became a member of the Irish Volunteers, Sinn Féin, the Gaelic League and the Irish Republican Brotherhood (IRB). He never married.

He was jailed in 1916 for his part in the Enniscorthy raid to seize the railway and to prevent reinforcements reaching Dublin to put down the Easter Rising. When the Dublin rising failed, Etchingham surrendered and was arrested, but released in the amnesty of 1917.

He was first elected as a Sinn Féin candidate for Wicklow East at the 1918 general election. As with the other Sinn Féin MPs, he did not take his seat in the British House of Commons, sitting instead in the revolutionary First Dáil, which met in the Mansion House, Dublin in January 1919.

He was later appointed to the government as Secretary for Fisheries. In May 1921 his residence at Courtown was destroyed by the Black and Tans. He was returned unopposed in the 1921 general election and opposed the Anglo-Irish Treaty in the Dáil debates and again at the Volunteer Executive. He lost his Dáil seat in the 1922 election.

Cumann na mBan leader Maire Comerford was good friend of Etchingham and wrote of his character:

He was a wonderful person, more unselfish than any man I ever met; a wise judge of men and the person who was fondly remembered by many because of the little sparks of gaiety he could produce when despondency was everywhere else - in a prison, or in his own sickroom, for he was very delicate.

After several months in a Dublin nursing home he returned to Courtown, where he died on 23 April 1923.

Parliament of the United Kingdom
Preceded by Anthony Donelan	Member of Parliament for East Wicklow; 1918–1922	Constituency abolished
Oireachtas
New constituency	Teachta Dála for East Wicklow; 1918–1921	Constituency abolished
Political offices
New office	Secretary for Fisheries; 1921–1922	Fionán Lynch

Dáil	Election	Deputy (Party)	Deputy (Party)	Deputy (Party)	Deputy (Party)	Deputy (Party)
2nd	1921	Richard Corish (SF)	James Ryan (SF)	Séamus Doyle (SF)	Seán Etchingham (SF)	4 seats 1921–1923
3rd	1922	Richard Corish (Lab)	Daniel O'Callaghan (Lab)	Séamus Doyle (AT-SF)	Michael Doyle (FP)	4 seats 1921–1923
4th	1923	Richard Corish (Lab)	James Ryan (Rep)	Robert Lambert (Rep)	Michael Doyle (FP)	Osmond Esmonde (CnaG)
5th	1927 (Jun)	Richard Corish (Lab)	James Ryan (FF)	James Shannon (Lab)	Michael Doyle (FP)	John Keating (NL)
6th	1927 (Sep)	Richard Corish (Lab)	James Ryan (FF)	Denis Allen (FF)	Michael Jordan (FP)	Osmond Esmonde (CnaG)
7th	1932	Richard Corish (Lab)	James Ryan (FF)	Denis Allen (FF)	John Keating (CnaG)	Osmond Esmonde (CnaG)
8th	1933	Richard Corish (Lab)	James Ryan (FF)	Patrick Kehoe (FF)	John Keating (CnaG)	Osmond Esmonde (CnaG)
8th	1936 by-election	Richard Corish (Lab)	James Ryan (FF)	Patrick Kehoe (FF)	John Keating (CnaG)	Denis Allen (FF)
9th	1937	Richard Corish (Lab)	James Ryan (FF)	John Keating (FG)	John Esmonde (FG)	Denis Allen (FF)
10th	1938	Richard Corish (Lab)	James Ryan (FF)	John Keating (FG)	John Esmonde (FG)	Denis Allen (FF)
11th	1943	Richard Corish (Lab)	James Ryan (FF)	John O'Leary (Lab)	John Esmonde (FG)	Denis Allen (FF)
12th	1944	Richard Corish (Lab)	James Ryan (FF)	John O'Leary (NLP)	John Keating (FG)	Denis Allen (FF)
12th	1945 by-election	Brendan Corish (Lab)	James Ryan (FF)	John O'Leary (NLP)	John Keating (FG)	Denis Allen (FF)
13th	1948	Brendan Corish (Lab)	James Ryan (FF)	John O'Leary (NLP)	John Esmonde (FG)	Denis Allen (FF)
14th	1951	Brendan Corish (Lab)	James Ryan (FF)	John O'Leary (Lab)	Anthony Esmonde (FG)	Denis Allen (FF)
15th	1954	Brendan Corish (Lab)	James Ryan (FF)	John O'Leary (Lab)	Anthony Esmonde (FG)	Denis Allen (FF)
16th	1957	Brendan Corish (Lab)	James Ryan (FF)	Seán Browne (FF)	Anthony Esmonde (FG)	Denis Allen (FF)
17th	1961	Brendan Corish (Lab)	James Ryan (FF)	Lorcan Allen (FF)	Anthony Esmonde (FG)	4 seats 1961–1981
18th	1965	Brendan Corish (Lab)	James Kennedy (FF)	Lorcan Allen (FF)	Anthony Esmonde (FG)	4 seats 1961–1981
19th	1969	Brendan Corish (Lab)	Seán Browne (FF)	Lorcan Allen (FF)	Anthony Esmonde (FG)	4 seats 1961–1981
20th	1973	Brendan Corish (Lab)	Seán Browne (FF)	Lorcan Allen (FF)	John Esmonde (FG)	4 seats 1961–1981
21st	1977	Brendan Corish (Lab)	Seán Browne (FF)	Lorcan Allen (FF)	Michael D'Arcy (FG)	4 seats 1961–1981
22nd	1981	Brendan Corish (Lab)	Ivan Yates (FG)	Lorcan Allen (FF)	Michael D'Arcy (FG)	Hugh Byrne (FF)
23rd	1982 (Feb)	Seán Browne (FF)	Ivan Yates (FG)	Lorcan Allen (FF)	Michael D'Arcy (FG)	Hugh Byrne (FF)
24th	1982 (Nov)	Avril Doyle (FG)	Ivan Yates (FG)	John Browne (FF)	Michael D'Arcy (FG)	Hugh Byrne (FF)
25th	1987	Avril Doyle (FG)	Ivan Yates (FG)	John Browne (FF)	Brendan Howlin (Lab)	Hugh Byrne (FF)
26th	1989	Michael D'Arcy (FG)	Ivan Yates (FG)	John Browne (FF)	Brendan Howlin (Lab)	Séamus Cullimore (FF)
27th	1992	Avril Doyle (FG)	Ivan Yates (FG)	John Browne (FF)	Brendan Howlin (Lab)	Hugh Byrne (FF)
28th	1997	Michael D'Arcy (FG)	Ivan Yates (FG)	John Browne (FF)	Brendan Howlin (Lab)	Hugh Byrne (FF)
29th	2002	Paul Kehoe (FG)	Liam Twomey (Ind.)	John Browne (FF)	Brendan Howlin (Lab)	Tony Dempsey (FF)
30th	2007	Paul Kehoe (FG)	Michael W. D'Arcy (FG)	John Browne (FF)	Brendan Howlin (Lab)	Seán Connick (FF)
31st	2011	Paul Kehoe (FG)	Liam Twomey (FG)	John Browne (FF)	Brendan Howlin (Lab)	Mick Wallace (Ind.)
32nd	2016	Paul Kehoe (FG)	Michael W. D'Arcy (FG)	James Browne (FF)	Brendan Howlin (Lab)	Mick Wallace (I4C)
32nd	2019 by-election	Paul Kehoe (FG)	Michael W. D'Arcy (FG)	James Browne (FF)	Brendan Howlin (Lab)	Malcolm Byrne (FF)
33rd	2020	Paul Kehoe (FG)	Verona Murphy (Ind.)	James Browne (FF)	Brendan Howlin (Lab)	Johnny Mythen (SF)
34th	2024	4 seats since 2024	Verona Murphy (Ind.)	James Browne (FF)	George Lawlor (Lab)	Johnny Mythen (SF)
