= East Cork (UK Parliament constituency) =

UK parliamentary constituency in Ireland, 1885–1922

- Former county constituency for the House of Commons

1885–1922
- Seats: 1
- Created from: County Cork and Youghal
- Replaced by: Cork East and North East

East Cork, a division of County Cork, was a parliamentary constituency in Ireland, represented in the Parliament of the United Kingdom. From 1885 to 1922 it returned one Member of Parliament (MP) to the House of Commons of the United Kingdom of Great Britain and Ireland.

Until the 1885 general election the area was part of the County Cork constituency. From 1922, on the establishment of the Irish Free State, it was not represented in the UK Parliament.

== Boundaries ==
This constituency comprised the eastern part of County Cork, consisting of the barony of Imokilly and that part of the barony of Barrymore not contained within the North East Cork constituency.

== Members of Parliament ==
| Election | Member | Party |
|---|---|---|
| 1885 | William John Lane | Irish Parliamentary Party |
| 1891 | William John Lane | Irish National Federation |
| 1892 | Anthony Donelan | Irish National Federation |
| 1900 | Anthony Donelan | Irish Parliamentary Party |
| 1911 by-election | John Muldoon | Irish Parliamentary Party |
| 1918 | David Kent | Sinn Féin |
| 1922 | constituency abolished | |

== Elections ==
=== Elections in the 1880s ===
1885 general election: East Cork
| Party | Candidate | Votes | % | ±% |
|---|---|---|---|---|
| Irish Parliamentary | William John Lane | 4,314 | 94.2 | |
| Independent | Henry Villiers-Stuart | 266 | 5.8 | |
| Majority | | 4,048 | 88.4 | |
| Turnout | | 4,580 | 58.4 | |
| Registered electors | | 6,934 | | |
| Irish Parliamentary win (new seat) | | | | |

1886 general election: East Cork
| Party | Candidate | Votes | % | ±% |
|---|---|---|---|---|
| Irish Parliamentary | William John Lane | Unopposed | | |
| Irish Parliamentary hold | | | | |

=== Elections in the 1890s ===
1892 general election: East Cork
| Party | Candidate | Votes | % | ±% |
|---|---|---|---|---|
| Irish National Federation | Anthony Donelan | Unopposed | | |
| Irish National Federation gain from Irish Parliamentary | | | | |

1895 general election: East Cork
| Party | Candidate | Votes | % | ±% |
|---|---|---|---|---|
| Irish National Federation | Anthony Donelan | Unopposed | | |
| Irish National Federation hold | | | | |

=== Elections in the 1900s ===
1900 general election: East Cork
| Party | Candidate | Votes | % | ±% |
|---|---|---|---|---|
| Irish Parliamentary | Anthony Donelan | Unopposed | | |
| Irish Parliamentary hold | | | | |

1906 general election: East Cork
| Party | Candidate | Votes | % | ±% |
|---|---|---|---|---|
| Irish Parliamentary | Anthony Donelan | Unopposed | | |
| Irish Parliamentary hold | | | | |

=== Elections in the 1910s ===
January 1910 general election: East Cork
| Party | Candidate | Votes | % | ±% |
|---|---|---|---|---|
| Irish Parliamentary | Anthony Donelan | Unopposed | | |
| Irish Parliamentary hold | | | | |

December 1910 general election: East Cork
| Party | Candidate | Votes | % | ±% |
|---|---|---|---|---|
| Irish Parliamentary | Anthony Donelan | 3,173 | 63.4 | N/A |
| All-for-Ireland | William O'Brien | 1,834 | 36.6 | N/A |
| Majority | | 1,339 | 26.8 | N/A |
| Turnout | | 5,007 | 79.3 | N/A |
| Registered electors | | 6,316 | | |
| Irish Parliamentary hold | | Swing | N/A | |

1911 by-election: East Cork
| Party | Candidate | Votes | % | ±% |
|---|---|---|---|---|
| Irish Parliamentary | John Muldoon | Unopposed | | |
| Irish Parliamentary hold | | | | |

1918 general election: East Cork
| Party | Candidate | Votes | % | ±% |
|---|---|---|---|---|
| Sinn Féin | David Kent | Unopposed | | |
| Sinn Féin gain from Irish Parliamentary | | | | |
