= Mickey Brady =

Northern Irish politician (1950–2026)

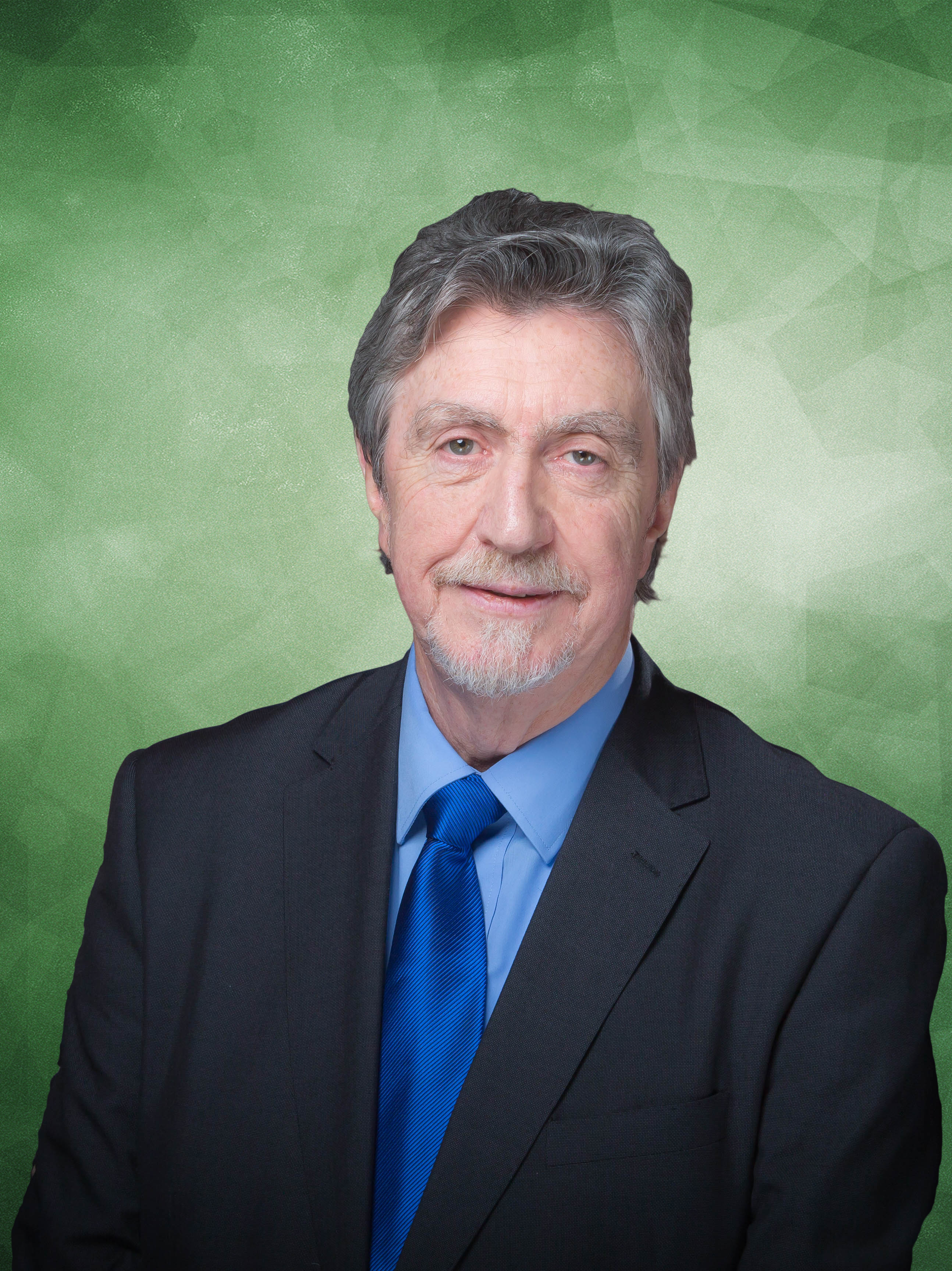
- Official portrait, 2015

Member of Parliament for Newry and Armagh
- In office 7 May 2015 – 30 May 2024
- Preceded by: Conor Murphy
- Succeeded by: Dáire Hughes

Member of the Northern Ireland Assembly for Newry and Armagh
- In office 7 March 2007 – 8 June 2015
- Preceded by: Davy Hyland
- Succeeded by: Conor Murphy

Personal details
- Born: Michael Brady; 7 October 1950 Newry, Northern Ireland
- Died: 16 January 2026 (aged 75)
- Party: Sinn Féin
- Spouse: Caroline Brady
- Children: 4
- Parent: Sally Brady (mother)
- Website: Official website

Michael Brady (7 October 1950 – 16 January 2026) was an Irish republican politician who was the Member of Parliament (MP) for Newry and Armagh from 2015 to 2024. He had previously been a Member of the Legislative Assembly of Northern Ireland for Newry and Armagh from 2007 to 2015.

== Early life ==
Brady was born in the Ballybot area of Newry on 7 October 1950. He attended the Abbey Primary School in the town and later the Abbey Christian Brothers' Grammar School. After this, he went to university in Liverpool. In 1981, Brady was employed by the Confederation of Community Groups in Newry, running a welfare rights advice centre, dealing with benefits and housing issues until 2007. His mother, Sarah "Sally" Brady (3 March 1909 – 4 May 2016), was the second oldest known living person in Northern Ireland.

== Career ==
Brady stated he was always interested in politics and was always an Irish republican. He joined Sinn Féin and first took a seat representating the constituency of Newry and Armagh in the Northern Ireland Assembly on 8 March 2007, before retaining the seat in the 2011 election. He was selected to contest the 2015 general election by party members and won the seat for the Newry and Armagh constituency. He did not take his seat in the House of Commons of the United Kingdom, in line with Sinn Féin's abstentionist policy.

Locally, Brady was also a member of the Confederation of Community Groups and a member of the Board of Governors for schools in his constituency.

On 4 May 2015, during his Westminster election campaign, Brady was told by the Police Service of Northern Ireland (PSNI) of a death threat against him. During the early hours of the following morning, he was advised again of another death threat against him and a bomb threat on his family home in Newry. The PSNI searched the property and found no devices.

On 8 June 2017, Brady was re-selected by Sinn Féin in the Newry & Armagh constituency to defend his Westminster seat at the snap 2017 United Kingdom general election.

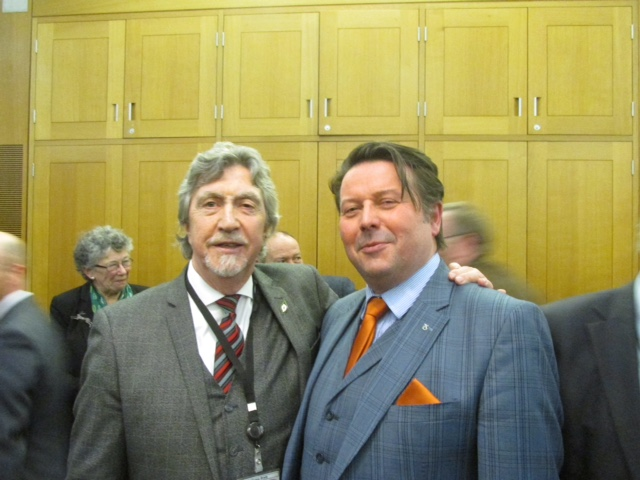
Brady with SNP MP Phil Boswell

Brady successfully defended his seat again at the 2019 general election on 12 December 2019.

In February 2024, Brady announced that he would step down at the 2024 general election.

== Death ==
Brady died on 16 January 2026, at the age of 75.

Northern Ireland Assembly
Preceded by Davy Hyland	MLA for Newry and Armagh; 2007–2015	Succeeded by Conor Murphy
Parliament of the United Kingdom
Preceded by Conor Murphy	Member of Parliament for Newry and Armagh; 2015–2024	Succeeded by Dáire Hughes
