= 2019 United Kingdom general election in Northern Ireland =

Result of Northern Ireland element of the UK General Election

- 12 December 2019

All 18 Northern Ireland seats to the House of Commons
- Turnout: 62.1% (▼3.3pp)
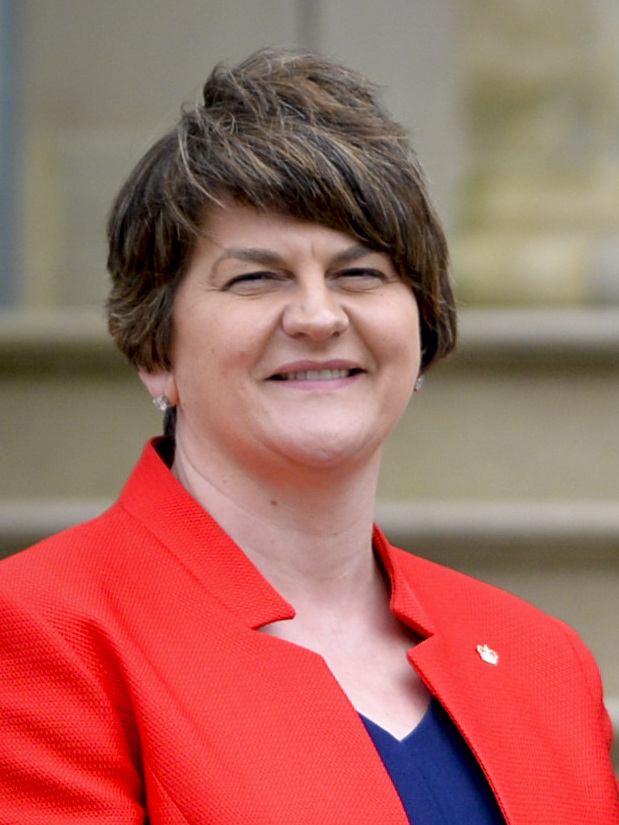

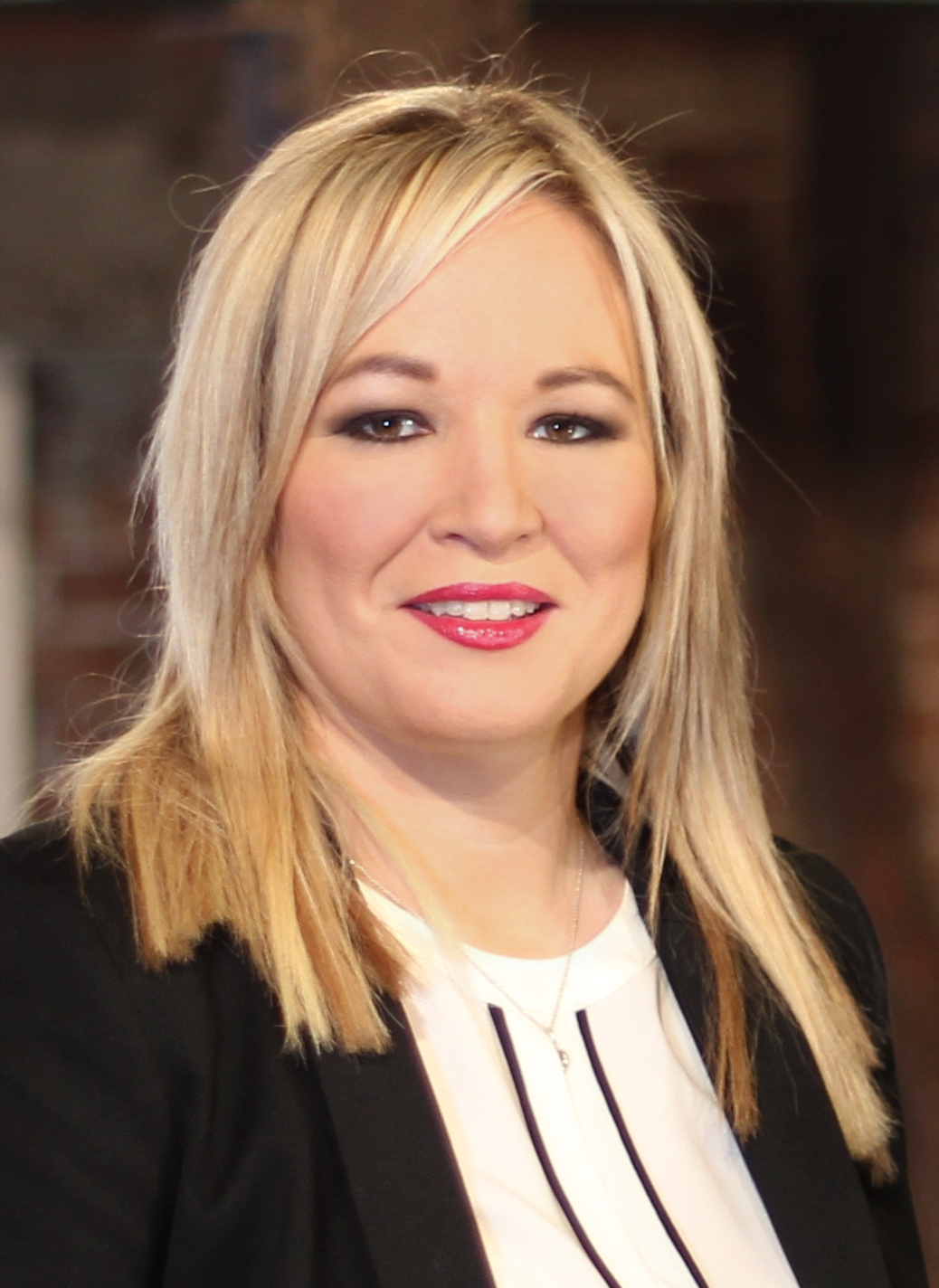

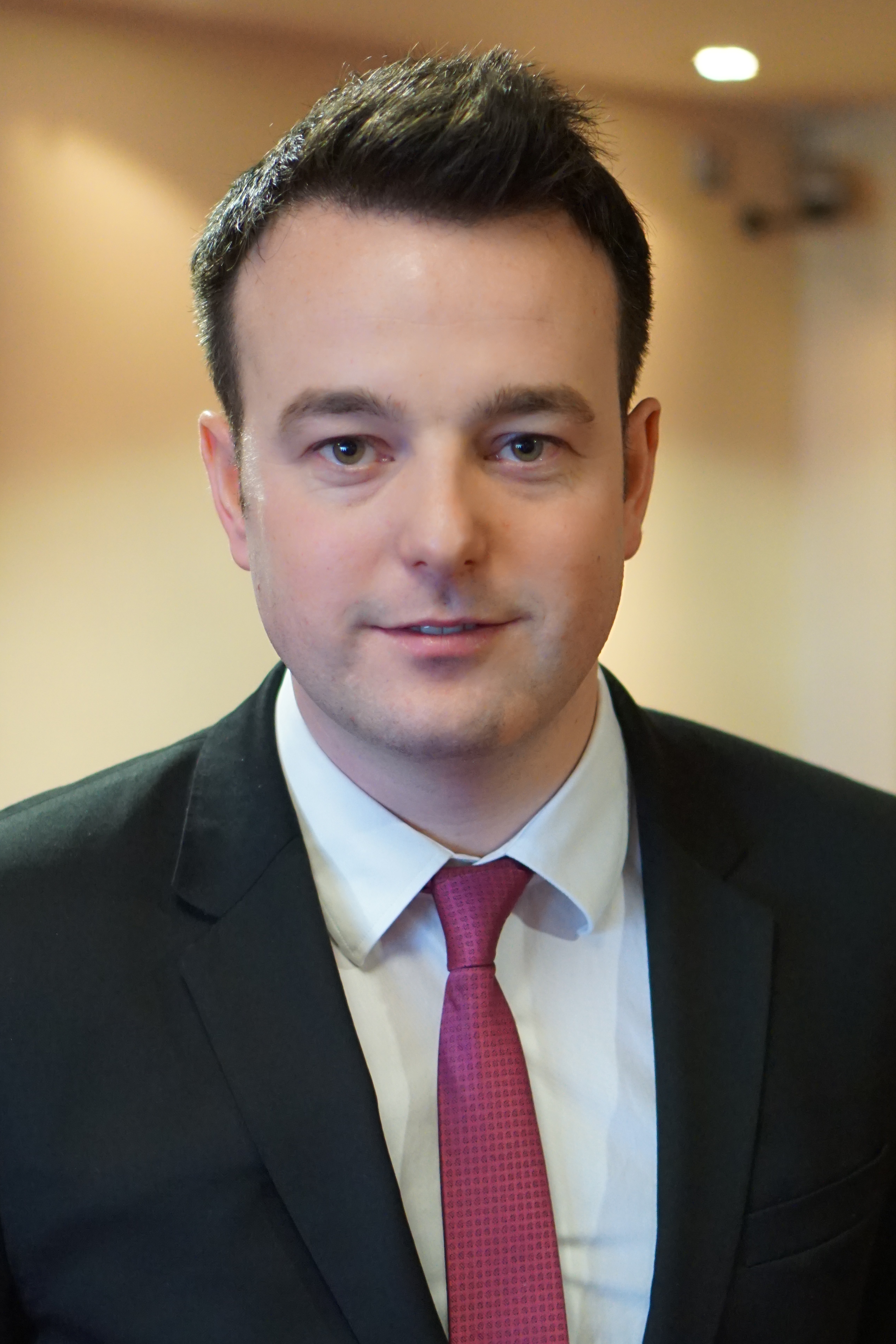

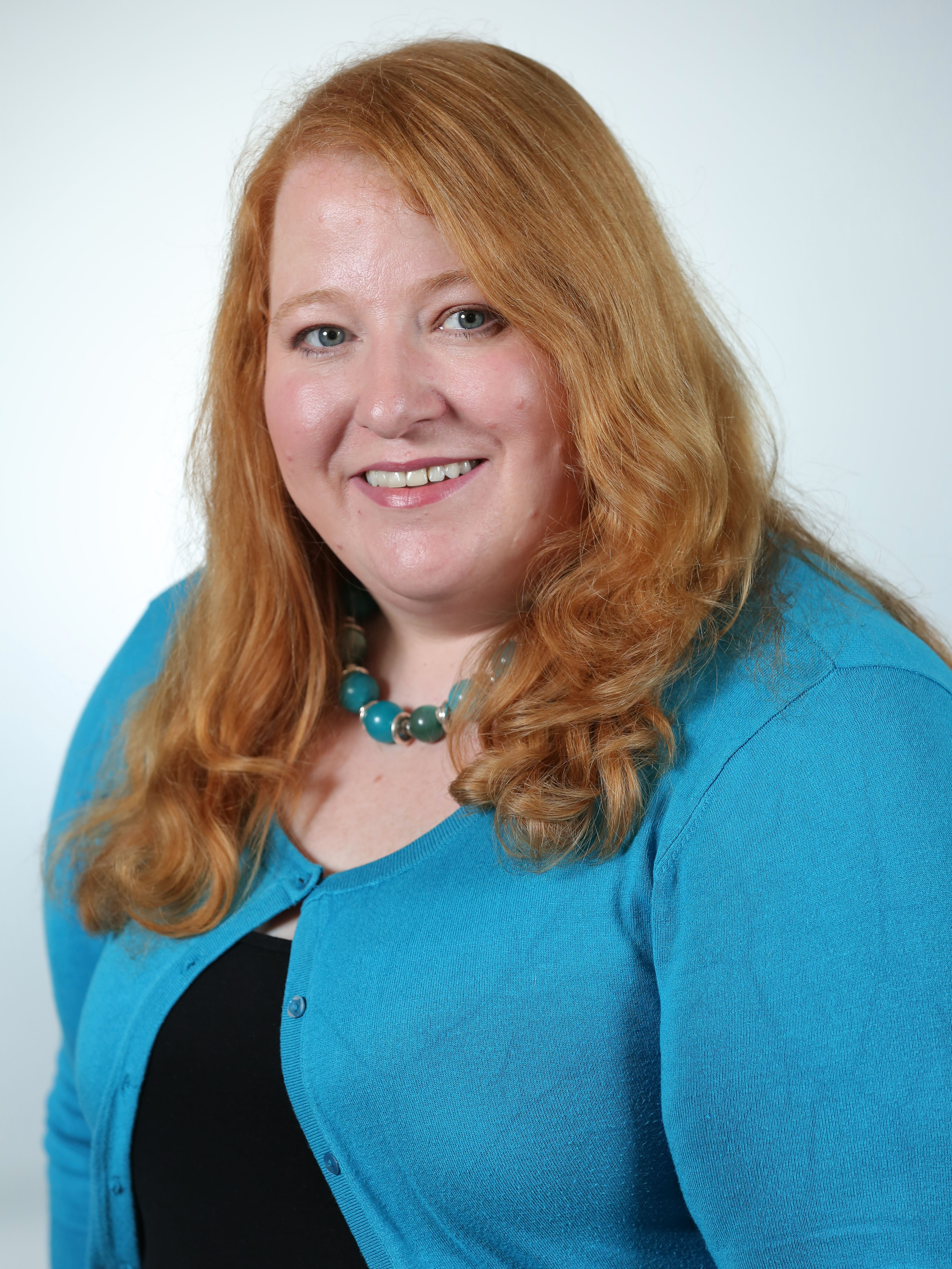

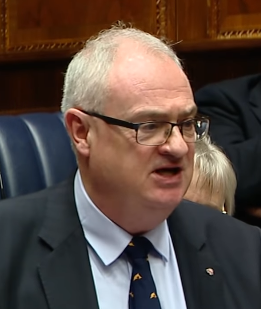
	First party	Second party	Third party
Leader	Arlene Foster	Michelle O'Neill (Note: "Party leader in the North" and vice president of Sinn Féin. Mary Lou McDonald is the party president and leader of the opposition in the Dáil of the Republic of Ireland.)	Colum Eastwood
Party	DUP	Sinn Féin	SDLP
Leader since	17 December 2015	23 January 2017	14 November 2015
Leader's seat	Did not stand (Note: Foster served as a MLA in the Northern Ireland Assembly for Fermanagh and South Tyrone.)	Did not stand (Note: O'Neill serves as a MLA in the Northern Ireland Assembly for Mid Ulster.)	Ran in Foyle (won)
Last election	10 seats, 36.0%	7 seats, 29.4%	0 seats, 11.7%
Seats won	8	7	2
Seat change	▼2	Steady	▲2
Popular vote	244,127	181,853	118,737
Percentage	30.6%	22.8%	14.9%
Swing	▼5.4%	▼6.7%	▲3.1%
	Fourth party	Fifth party
Leader	Naomi Long (Note: An MEP for Northern Ireland.)	Steve Aiken (Note: An MLA in the Northern Ireland Assembly for South Antrim.)
Party	Alliance	UUP
Leader since	26 October 2016	9 November 2019
Leader's seat	Ran in Belfast East (lost)	Ran in East Antrim (lost)
Last election	0 seats, 7.9%	0 seats, 10.3%
Seats won	1	0
Seat change	▲1	Steady
Popular vote	134,115	93,123
Percentage	16.8%	11.7%
Swing	▲8.8%	▲1.4%
- A map presenting the results of the election, by party of the MP elected from each constituency.

On 12 December 2019, the 2019 United Kingdom general election was held in Northern Ireland, to elect all 650 members of the House of Commons, including the 18 Northern Ireland seats.

1,293,971 people were eligible to vote, up 51,273 from the 2017 general election. 62.09% of eligible voters turned out, down 3.5 percentage points from the last general election. For the first time in history, nationalist parties won more seats than unionist parties.

== Electoral system ==
MPs were elected in 18 Single Member constituencies by first-past-the-post.

== Background ==
The election was called on 29 October 2019 under the Early Parliamentary General Election Act 2019. At the 2017 election, the nationalist Social Democratic and Labour Party (SDLP) and the Ulster Unionist Party (UUP) lost all of their seats. The DUP won 10 seats, Sinn Féin won 7 seats, and Independent Unionist Sylvia Hermon was also elected. The election ended in a hung parliament, and the Democratic Unionist Party (DUP) signed a confidence and supply agreement with the Conservative Party.

In 2018, Sinn Féin MP for West Tyrone, Barry McElduff, resigned after a social media post he made caused controversy regarding perceived sectarianism on the Kingsmill massacre. The party won a by-election later, but with a plurality instead of a majority.

In the 2019 European Parliament election, Sinn Féin, the DUP, and the Alliance Party each won a seat.

== Participating parties ==
102 candidates stood in the general election. The Alliance Party was the only party standing in all 18 seats. The DUP stood in 17 seats, the UUP in 16, and both Sinn Féin and the SDLP in 15 seats. Aontú stood in 7 seats, the Northern Ireland Conservatives in 4, the Green Party of Northern Ireland in 3, and People Before Profit and the UK Independence Party in 2. Traditional Unionist Voice did not stand in this election. There were also three independent candidates. Sylvia Hermon did not contest this election.

Sinn Féin operates on an all-Ireland basis. Their MPs in Westminster practice abstentionism, meaning they do not take their seats in the House of Commons. Aontú, who like Sinn Féin are an abstentionist all-Ireland party, was formed in January 2019.

== Opinion polling ==
Pollster/client(s)	Date(s) conducted	Sample size	DUP	SF	SDLP	UUP	Alliance	Green	Other	Lead
2019 general election	12 Dec 2019	–	30.6%	22.8%	14.9%	11.7%	16.8%	0.2%	3.1% (Note: Aontú (1.2%), People Before Profit (0.9%) and the Conservative Party (0.7%) outpolled the Greens despite not being measured separately in pre-election polling.)	7.8%
Lucid Talk/Remain United	27–30 Nov 2019	2,422	30%	25%	13%	11%	16%	0%	5%	5%
	9 November 2019	Steve Aiken officially becomes leader of the Ulster Unionist Party								
Lucid Talk/Remain United	30 Oct–1 Nov 2019	2,386	28%	24%	14%	9%	16%	1%	8% (Note: Including 1% for Traditional Unionist Voice, 1% for People Before Profit and 3% for Sylvia Hermon.)	4%
Lucid Talk	9–12 Aug 2019	2,302	29%	25%	8%	9%	21%	1%	7%	4%
	21 November 2018	Clare Bailey officially becomes leader of NI Green Party								
Survation/Channel 4	20 Oct–2 Nov 2018	555	31%	27%	11%	15%	12%	–	4%	4%
	3 May 2018	West Tyrone by-election								
	10 Feb 2018	Mary Lou McDonald becomes leader of Sinn Féin								
2017 general election	8 Jun 2017	–	36.0%	29.4%	11.7%	10.3%	7.9%	0.9%	3.7%	6.6%

== Results ==
Party	Seats					Aggregate Votes		
Party	Total	Gains	Losses	Net +/-	Of all (%)	Total	Of all (%)	Difference
DUP	8	0	2	▼2	44.4	244,128	30.6	▼5.4
Sinn Féin	7	1	1	Steady	38.9	181,853	22.8	▼6.7
SDLP	2	2	0	▲2	11.1	118,737	14.9	▲3.1
Alliance	1	1	0	▲1	5.6	134,115	16.8	▲8.8
UUP	0	0	0	Steady	0.0	93,123	11.7	▲1.4
Aontú	0	0	0	Steady	0.0	9,814	1.2	New
People Before Profit	0	0	0	Steady	0.0	7,526	0.9	▲0.2
NI Conservatives	0	0	0	Steady	0.0	5,433	0.7	▲0.2
Green (NI)	0	0	0	Steady	0.0	1,996	0.2	▼0.7
Independent	0	0	1	▼1	0.0	1,687	0.2	▼1.8
UKIP	0	0	0	Steady	0.0	623	0.1	New
Total	18					799,035	61.8	▼3.6

Individual seats by winner vote share

=== Results by constituency ===
Constituency	2017 result	2019 winning party				Turnout	Votes								
Constituency	2017 result	Party	Votes	Share	Majority	Turnout	DUP	SF	APNI	SDLP	UUP	Con	Grn	Other	Total
Belfast East	DUP	DUP	20,874	49.2%	1,819	64.1%	20,874		19,055		2,516				42,445
Belfast North	DUP	SF	23,078	47.1%	1,943	67.9%	21,135	23,078	4,824						49,037
Belfast South	DUP	SDLP	27,079	57.2%	15,401	67.7%	11,678		6,786	27,079	1,259			550	47,352
Belfast West	SF	SF	20,866	53.8%	14,672	59.1%	5,220	20,866	1,882	2,985				7,829	38,782
East Antrim	DUP	DUP	16,871	45.3%	6,706	57.5%	16,871	2,120	10,165	902	5,475	1,043	685		37,261
East Londonderry	DUP	DUP	15,765	40.1%	9,607	56.8%	15,765	6,128	5,921	6,158	3,599			1,731	39,302
Fermanagh and South Tyrone	SF	SF	21,986	43.3%	57	69.7%		21,986	2,650	3,446	21,929			751	50,762
Foyle	SF	SDLP	26,881	57.0%	17,110	63.4%	4,773	9,771	1,267	26,881	1,088			3,364	47,143
Lagan Valley	DUP	DUP	19,586	43.1%	6,499	60.0%	19,586	1,098	13,087	1,758	8,606	955		315	45,405
Mid Ulster	SF	SF	20,473	45.9%	9,537	63.3%	10,936	20,473	3,526	6,384	2,611			690	44,620
Newry and Armagh	SF	SF	20,287	40.0%	9,287	62.5%	11,000	20,287	4,211	9,449	4,204			1,628	50,779
North Antrim	DUP	DUP	20,860	47.4%	12,721	57.1%	20,860	5,632	6,231	2,943	8,139			246	44,051
North Down	Ind	APNI	18,358	45.2%	2,968	60.6%	15,390		18,358		4,936	1,959			40,643
South Antrim	DUP	DUP	15,149	35.3%	2,689	59.9%	15,149	4,887	8,190	2,288	12,460				42,974
South Down	SF	SF	16,137	32.4%	1,620	62.9%	7,619	16,137	6,916	14,517	3,307			1,266	49,762
Strangford	DUP	DUP	17,705	47.2%	7,071	56.0%	17,705	555	10,634	1,994	4,023	1,476	790	308	37,485
Upper Bann	DUP	DUP	20,501	41.0%	8,210	60.4%	20,501	12,291	6,433	4,623	6,197				50,045
West Tyrone	SF	SF	16,544	40.2%	7,478	62.2%	9,066	16,544	3,979	7,330	2,774		521	972	41,186
Total for all constituencies						Turnout									Total
Total for all constituencies						Turnout	DUP	SF	APNI	SDLP	UUP	Con	Grn	Other	Total
Total for all constituencies						Turnout	Votes								
Total for all constituencies						61.8%	244,128	181,853	134,115	118,737	93,123	5,433	1,996	19,650	799,035
Total for all constituencies						61.8%	30.6%	22.8%	16.8%	14.9%	11.7%	0.7%	0.2%	2.5%	100.0%
Total for all constituencies						61.8%	Seats								
Total for all constituencies						61.8%	8	7	1	2	0	0	0	0	18
Total for all constituencies						61.8%	44%	39%	6%	11%	0%	0%	0%	0%	100.0%

Parliamentary seats
DUP	44.4%
Sinn Féin	38.9%
SDLP	11.1%
Alliance	5.6%

== See also ==
- 2019 United Kingdom general election in England
- 2019 United Kingdom general election in Scotland
- 2019 United Kingdom general election in Wales
