= Newry and Armagh (UK Parliament constituency) =

UK Parliament constituency (since 1983)

Coordinates: 54°14′52″N 6°36′06″W

- County constituency for the House of Commons
- Boundary of Newry and Armagh in Northern Ireland
- District: Armagh City, Banbridge and Craigavon; Newry, Mourne and Down

Current constituency
- Created: 1983
- Member of Parliament: Dáire Hughes (Sinn Féin)
- Created from: Armagh; South Down

Newry and Armagh is a parliamentary constituency in the United Kingdom House of Commons. The current MP is Dáire Hughes of Sinn Féin who was first elected at the 2024 election.

Map of current boundaries

== History ==
The constituency is majority nationalist, though on its creation at the 1983 general election, Jim Nicholson of the Ulster Unionist Party won the seat due to the nationalist vote being divided between the Social Democratic and Labour Party and Sinn Féin. In 1986, Nicholson, along with all the other unionist MPs, resigned his seat in protest over the Anglo-Irish Agreement and stood in a by-election to provide voters the opportunity to decide on it. Seamus Mallon won the seat and held it at successive elections until his retirement in 2005.

In the 2001 general election, Sinn Féin cut into Mallon's majority, outpolling the SDLP in the equivalent area local elections held on the same day. In the 2003 Assembly election Sinn Féin won three seats to the SDLP's one. When Mallon retired in 2005 Sinn Féin won the seat.

Newry is overwhelmingly nationalist, and was one of two districts in Northern Ireland to return a numerical majority of people identifying themselves as "Irish" at the 2011 census at 52.1% Irish.

Armagh is more unionist, though it does have a larger proportion of people identifying as "Irish" in comparison to the Northern Ireland average at 44.4% "British" and 32.4% "Irish".

== Boundaries ==
The seat was created after boundary changes in 1983, as part of an expansion of Northern Ireland's constituencies from 12 to 17, from areas which had been part of the Armagh and South Down constituencies.

In 1995, the Boundary Commission originally proposed to abolish the seat with the Armagh district joining most of Dungannon in a new 'Blackwater' constituency with the rest becoming part of a new Newry and Mourne constituency. This was strongly opposed during the local enquiries and the eventual boundary review did not implement it.

1983–1997	The district of Armagh; and in the district of Newry and Mourne, the wards of Ballybot, Belleek, Bessbrook, Camlough, Creggan, Crossmaglen, Daisy Hill, Derrymore, Drumalane, Drumgullion, Fathom, Forkhill, Newtownhamilton, St Mary's, St Patrick's, Tullyhappy, and Windsor Hill.
1997–2024	The district of Armagh; and in the district of Newry and Mourne, the wards of Ballybot, Bessbrook, Camlough, Creggan, Crossmaglen, Daisy Hill, Derrymore, Drumalane, Drumgullion, Fathom, Forkhill, Newtownhamilton, St Mary's, St Patrick's, Silver Bridge, Tullyhappy and Windsor Hill.
2024–	In Armagh City, Banbridge and Craigavon, the wards of Cathedral, Demesne, Hamiltonsbawn, Keady, Markethill, Navan, Richhill, Seagahan, Tandragee, and The Mall; and in Newry, Mourne and Down, the wards of Abbey, Ballybot, Bessbrook, Camlough, Crossmaglen, Damolly, Drumalane, Fathom, Forkhill, Mullaghbane, Newtownhamilton, St. Patricks, and Whitecross.

== Members of Parliament ==
Seamus Mallon, the MP from 1986 to 2005, served as deputy leader of the SDLP from 1979 to 2001 and deputy First Minister of Northern Ireland from 1998 to 2001.

Election	Member	Party
1983	Jim Nicholson	UUP
1986 b	Seamus Mallon	SDLP
1987	Seamus Mallon	SDLP
1992	Seamus Mallon	SDLP
1997	Seamus Mallon	SDLP
2001	Seamus Mallon	SDLP
2005	Conor Murphy	Sinn Féin
2010	Conor Murphy	Sinn Féin
2015	Mickey Brady	Sinn Féin
2017	Mickey Brady	Sinn Féin
2019	Mickey Brady	Sinn Féin
2024	Dáire Hughes	Sinn Féin

== Election results ==
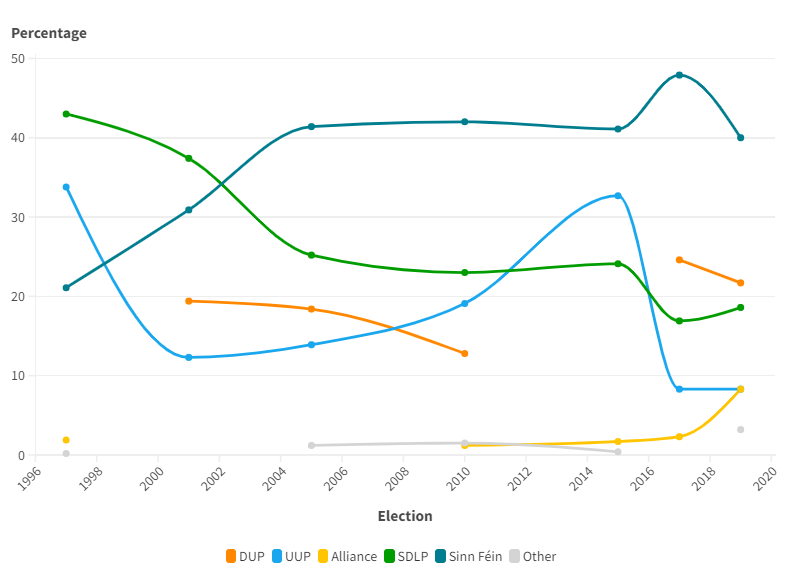

=== Elections in the 2020s ===
2024 general election: Newry and Armagh
Party	Candidate	Votes	%	±%
Sinn Féin	Dáire Hughes	22,299	48.5	+7.5
SDLP	Pete Byrne	6,806	14.8	−4.6
DUP	Gareth Wilson	5,900	12.8	−7.4
TUV	Keith Ratcliffe	4,099	8.9	New
UUP	Sam Nicholson	3,175	6.9	−0.8
Alliance	Helena Young	2,692	5.9	−2.5
Aontú	Liam Reichenberg	888	1.9	−1.4
NI Conservatives	Samantha Rayner	83	0.2	New
Majority		15,493	33.7	+15.4
Turnout		45,942	58.7	−3.8
Registered electors		78,244		
Sinn Féin hold		Swing	▲6.1	

=== Elections in the 2010s ===
2019 general election: Newry and Armagh
Party	Candidate	Votes	%	±%
Sinn Féin	Mickey Brady	20,287	40.0	―7.9
DUP	William Irwin	11,000	21.7	―2.9
SDLP	Pete Byrne	9,449	18.6	+1.7
Alliance	Jackie Coade	4,211	8.3	+6.0
UUP	Sam Nicholson	4,204	8.3	±0.0
Aontú	Martin Kelly	1,628	3.2	New
Majority		9,287	18.3	―5.0
Turnout		50,779	62.5	―6.0
Registered electors		81,246		
Sinn Féin hold		Swing		

2017 general election: Newry and Armagh
Party	Candidate	Votes	%	±%
Sinn Féin	Mickey Brady	25,666	47.9	+6.8
DUP	William Irwin	13,177	24.6	New
SDLP	Justin McNulty	9,055	16.9	―7.2
UUP	Sam Nicholson	4,425	8.3	―24.4
Alliance	Jackie Coade	1,256	2.3	+0.6
Majority		12,489	23.3	+14.9
Turnout		53,579	68.5	+4.3
Registered electors		78,266		
Sinn Féin hold		Swing		

2015 general election: Newry and Armagh
Party	Candidate	Votes	%	±%
Sinn Féin	Mickey Brady	20,488	41.1	―0.9
UUP	Danny Kennedy	16,312	32.7	+13.6
SDLP	Justin McNulty	12,026	24.1	+0.7
Alliance	Kate Nicholl	841	1.7	+0.5
NI Conservatives	Robert Rigby	210	0.4	New
Majority		4,176	8.4	―10.2
Turnout		49,877	64.2	+3.8
Registered electors		77,633		
Sinn Féin hold		Swing	―7.2	

2010 general election: Newry and Armagh
Party	Candidate	Votes	%	±%
Sinn Féin	Conor Murphy	18,857	42.0	+0.6
SDLP	Dominic Bradley	10,526	23.4	―1.8
UCU-NF	Danny Kennedy	8,558	19.1	+5.2
DUP	William Irwin	5,764	12.8	―5.6
Independent	Willie Frazer	656	1.5	New
Alliance	Andrew Muir	545	1.2	New
Majority		8,331	18.6	+2.4
Turnout		44,906	60.4	―9.6
Registered electors		74,308		
Sinn Féin hold		Swing	+1.2	

=== Elections in the 2000s ===
2005 general election: Newry and Armagh
Party	Candidate	Votes	%	±%
Sinn Féin	Conor Murphy	20,965	41.4	+10.5
SDLP	Dominic Bradley	12,770	25.2	―12.2
DUP	Paul Berry	9,311	18.4	―1.0
UUP	Danny Kennedy	7,025	13.9	+1.6
Independent	Gerry Markey	625	1.2	New
Majority		8,195	16.2	N/A
Turnout		50,696	70.0	―6.8
Registered electors		71,771		
Sinn Féin gain from SDLP		Swing	+11.3	

2001 general election: Newry and Armagh
Party	Candidate	Votes	%	±%
SDLP	Seamus Mallon	20,784	37.4	―5.6
Sinn Féin	Conor Murphy	17,209	30.9	+9.8
DUP	Paul Berry	10,795	19.4	New
UUP	Sylvia McRoberts	6,833	12.3	―21.5
Majority		3,575	6.5	―2.7
Turnout		55,621	76.8	+1.4
Registered electors		72,466		
SDLP hold		Swing	―7.8	

=== Elections in the 1990s ===
1997 general election: Newry and Armagh
Party	Candidate	Votes	%	±%
SDLP	Seamus Mallon	22,904	43.0	―6.3
UUP	Danny Kennedy	18,015	33.8	―2.5
Sinn Féin	Patrick McNamee	11,218	21.1	+8.6
Alliance	Peter Whitcroft	1,015	1.9	0.0
Natural Law	David Evans	123	0.2	New
Majority		4,889	9.2	―3.9
Turnout		53,275	75.4	―2.5
Registered electors		70,807		
SDLP hold		Swing	―1.9	

1997 Changes are compared to the 1992 notional results shown below.

Notional 1992 UK general election result: Newry and Armagh
Party	Candidate	Votes	%	±%
SDLP	N/A	25,740	49.3	N/A
UUP	N/A	18,930	36.3	N/A
Sinn Féin	N/A	6,530	12.5	N/A
Alliance	N/A	972	1.9	N/A
Majority		6,810	13.1	N/A

1992 general election: Newry and Armagh
Party	Candidate	Votes	%	±%
SDLP	Seamus Mallon	26,073	49.6	+1.5
UUP	Jim Speers	18,982	36.1	―1.8
Sinn Féin	Brendan Curran	6,547	12.5	+0.7
Alliance	Eileen Bell	972	1.8	+0.5
Majority		7,091	13.5	+3.3
Turnout		52,574	77.9	―1.3
Registered electors		67,531		
SDLP hold		Swing	+1.7	

=== Elections in the 1980s ===
1987 general election: Newry and Armagh
Party	Candidate	Votes	%	±%
SDLP	Seamus Mallon	25,137	48.1	+11.3
UUP	Jim Nicholson	19,812	37.9	―2.1
Sinn Féin	Jim McAllister	6,173	11.8	―9.1
Alliance	William Henry Jeffrey	664	1.3	New
Workers' Party	Gerard O'Hanlon	482	0.9	―1.4
Majority		5,325	10.2	N/A
Turnout		52,268	79.2	+3.2
Registered electors		66,027		
SDLP gain from UUP		Swing	+6.7	

By-election 1986: Newry and Armagh
Party	Candidate	Votes	%	±%
SDLP	Seamus Mallon	22,694	45.5	+8.7
UUP	Jim Nicholson	20,111	40.3	+0.3
Sinn Féin	Jim McAllister	6,609	13.2	―7.7
Workers' Party	Patrick McCusker	515	1.0	―1.3
Majority		2,583	5.2	N/A
Turnout		49,929	76.9	+0.9
Registered electors		65,142		
SDLP gain from UUP		Swing	+4.2	

1983 general election: Newry and Armagh
Party	Candidate	Votes	%	±%
UUP	Jim Nicholson	18,988	40.0	
SDLP	Seamus Mallon	17,434	36.8	
Sinn Féin	Jim McAllister	9,928	20.9	
Workers' Party	Thomas Moore	1,070	2.3	
Majority		1,554	3.2	
Turnout		47,420	76.0	
Registered electors		62,298		
UUP win (new seat)				

== See also ==
- List of parliamentary constituencies in Northern Ireland
- Newry and Armagh (Assembly constituency)
