= Dáire Hughes =

Irish politician

Dáire Hughes MP
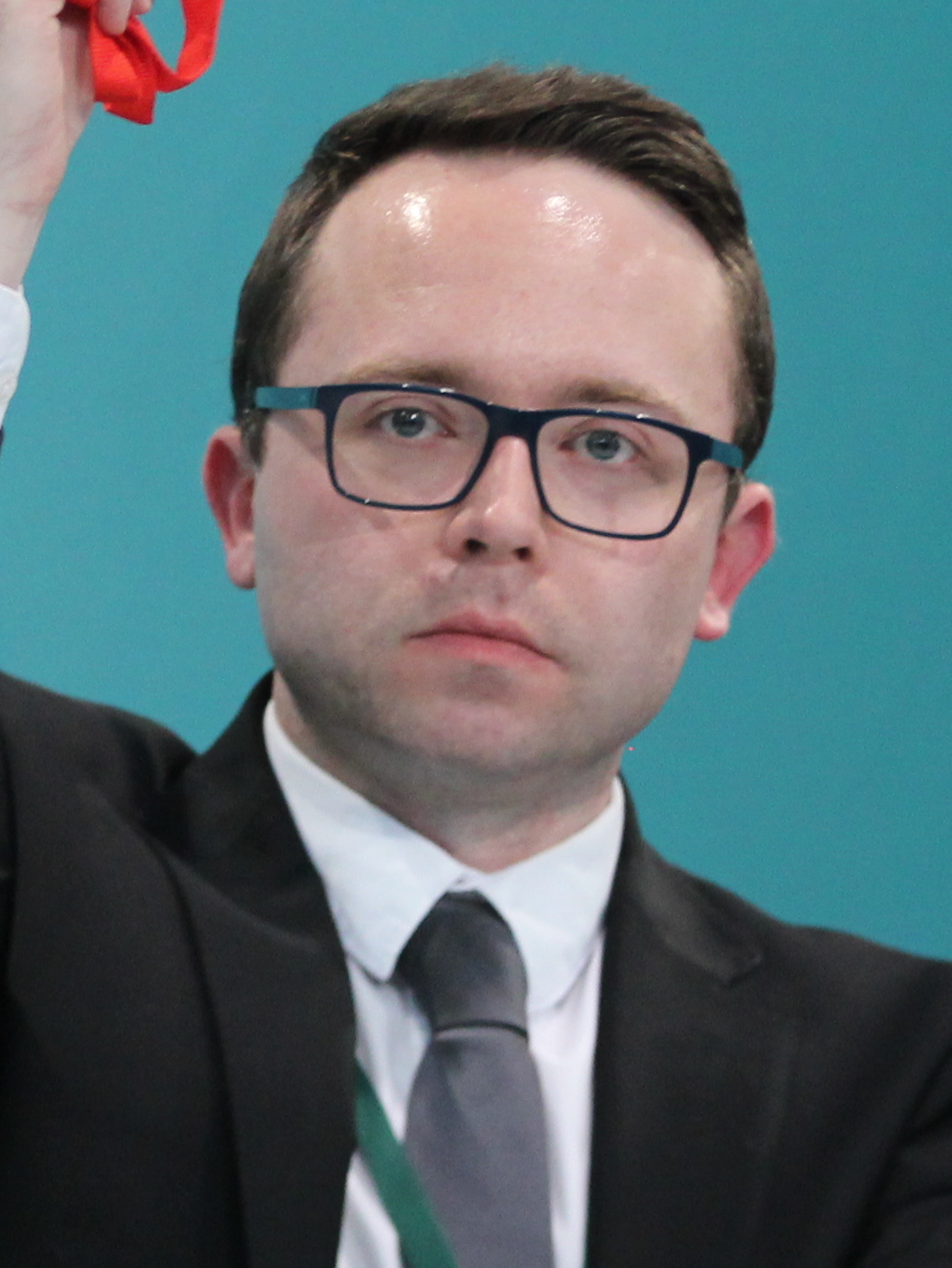
- Hughes in 2024

Member of Parliament for Newry and Armagh
- Incumbent
- Assumed office 4 July 2024
- Preceded by: Mickey Brady
- Majority: 15,493 (33.7%)

Mayor of Newry and Mourne
- In office 25 May 2014 – 2015
- Deputy: Brian Quinn
- Preceded by: Michael Ruane
- Succeeded by: Office abolished

Member of Newry and Mourne District Council
- In office January 2014 – 22 May 2014
- Constituency: The Fews

Personal details
- Born: 1989 or 1990 (age 36–37) Newry, Northern Ireland
- Party: Sinn Féin
- Education: Queen's University Belfast

Dáire Hughes (born 1990) is an Irish Sinn Féin politician who has served as Member of Parliament (MP) for Newry and Armagh since 2024. He was the youngest ever Mayor of Newry and Mourne District Council and the last occupant of the role.

== Early life and education ==
Hughes is from the Meadow in Newry, Northern Ireland. He was educated at St Patrick's Primary School and St Colman's College before attending Queen's University Belfast in Belfast.

Hughes has served as a Union representative and has worked in the community voluntary sector in Newry and Armagh.

== Political career ==
He was co-opted onto Newry and Mourne District Council for Sinn Féin. In 2014, Hughes was chosen by the party to become the youngest-ever and last mayor of the council. He failed to be elected at the 2014 Newry, Mourne and Down District Council election to the new council.

Hughes served as a political advisor to the Sinn Féin team in the European Parliament, working on the Civil Liberties, Justice and Home Affairs Committee and the Delegation for relations with Palestine. Following the 2015 United Kingdom general election, he focused on the work of the Constitutional Affairs Committee, charting the impending Brexit referendum.

Following the end of the 2014–2019 mandate, Hughes took up a position within Sinn Féin majoring on the growing debate on Irish unity. In early 2020, he was appointed Leas Ard Runaí (Deputy General Secretary) of Sinn Féin.

=== 2024–present ===
In May 2024, Sinn Féin announced that Hughes would run in the 2024 United Kingdom general election, to succeed retiring Sinn Féin politician Mickey Brady as the Member of Parliament (MP) for Newry and Armagh.

Hughes won the seat with 22,299 votes, a majority of 15,493. Hughes received 2,012 more votes than Brady received in the previous election. In line with Sinn Féin's long standing policy of abstentionism, he has not taken his seat in Westminster.

Parliament of the United Kingdom
Preceded by Mickey Brady	Member of Parliament for Newry and Armagh; 2024–present	Incumbent
