= Opinion polling for the 2019 United Kingdom general election =

Opinion polling for the 2019 United Kingdom general election was carried out by various organisations to gauge voting intentions. Most of the polling companies listed are members of the British Polling Council (BPC) and abide by its disclosure rules. The opinion polls listed range from the previous election on 8 June 2017 to the election on 12 December 2019.

Under the Fixed-term Parliaments Act 2011, the next general election after 2017 was not scheduled to be held until 5 May 2022. However, in late 2019, amid deadlock over the Brexit withdrawal agreement, Prime Minister Boris Johnson sought a snap election. After multiple failed attempts, Johnson introduced the Early Parliamentary General Election Act 2019, which was overwhelmingly approved by the House of Commons on 29 October 2019, triggering an early election.

== Graphical summaries ==
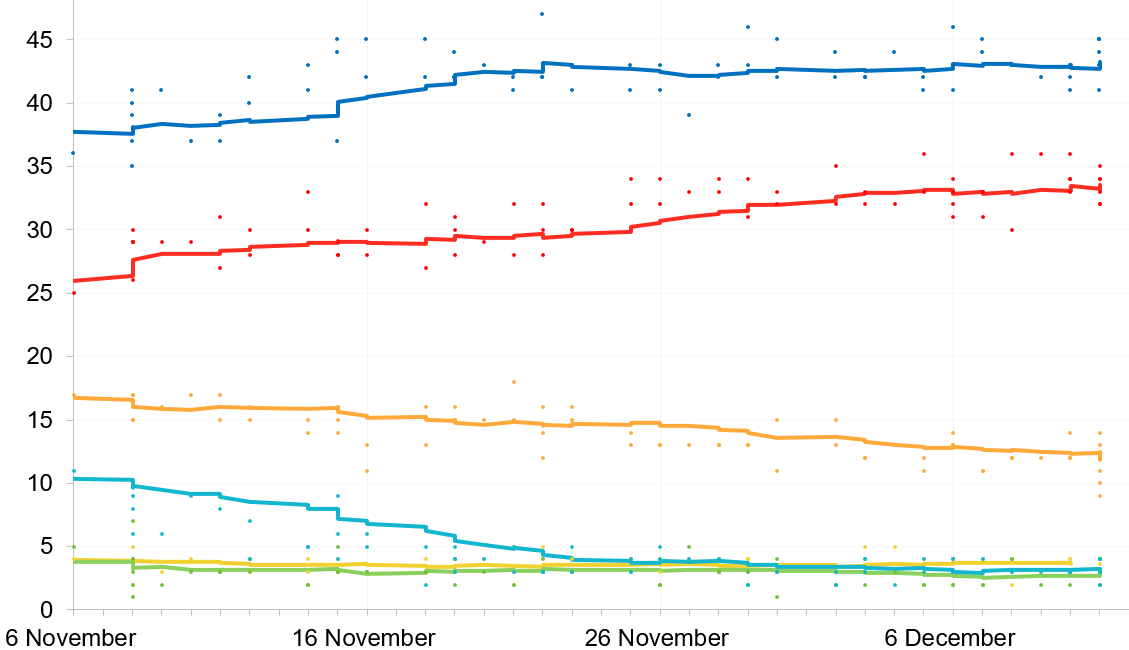

== Guide to tables ==
Poll results are listed in the tables below in reverse chronological order. The highest percentage figure in each poll is displayed in bold, and its background is shaded in the leading party's colour. The "lead" column shows the percentage point difference between the two parties with the highest figures. When a poll result is a tie, the figures with the highest percentages are shaded and displayed in bold.

"Green" in these tables refers to combined totals for the green parties in the United Kingdom, namely the Green Party of England and Wales, the Scottish Greens, and, for polls of the entire UK, the Green Party Northern Ireland. The three parties share a commitment to environmental policies, but are independent of one another, with each contesting elections only in its own region.

The various polls use a variety of methodologies. For example, in Kantar and Ipsos MORI polls, Change UK and the Brexit Party were spontaneous responses and not prompted by the pollster. In YouGov polls before June 2019, only the Conservatives, Labour, and Liberal Democrats were prompted, the names of other parties being listed when "other" was selected. YouGov polls conducted since June 2019 prompt for both the Greens and the Brexit Party, alongside the earlier list. BMG polls also use two-stage questions in which the Conservatives, Labour, Liberal Democrats, the Brexit Party, the Greens, SNP, and Plaid Cymru are included on the initial prompt and the remaining parties provided after "another party" is selected. Prior to August 2019, BMG did not prompt the Brexit Party and the Greens initially.

As the parties standing for each seat became known—and after the 11 November 2019 announcement that the Brexit Party would not be contesting the 317 seats won by the Conservatives in 2017—the major pollsters began listing only those standing in a respondent's constituency as options.

== National poll results ==
Most national opinion polls do not cover Northern Ireland, which has different major political parties from the rest of the United Kingdom. This distinction is made in the tables below in the area column, where "GB" means Great Britain (England, Scotland and Wales), and "UK" means the entire United Kingdom. Plaid Cymru only stand candidates in Wales and the Scottish National Party (SNP) only stand candidates in Scotland.

=== 2019 ===
Date(s) conducted	Pollster/client(s)	Area	Sample size	Con	Lab	LD	SNP	UKIP	Grn	PC	Brx	Chg	Others	Lead
12 Dec 2019	2019 general election	UK	–	43.6%	32.1%	11.6%	3.9%	0.1%	2.7%	0.5%	2.0%	0.03%	3.1%	11.5
12 Dec 2019	2019 general election	GB	–	44.7%	33.0%	11.8%	4.0%	0.1%	2.8%	0.5%	2.1%	0.03%	1.0%	11.7
10–11 Dec	Survation	GB	2,395	45%	34%	9%	4%	–	3%	1%	3%	–	1%	11
10–11 Dec	Panelbase	GB	3,174	43%	34%	11%	4%	–	3%	0%	4%	–	–	9
10–11 Dec	Opinium	GB	3,005	45%	33%	12%	4%	–	2%	0%	2%	–	1%	12
9–11 Dec	Ipsos MORI/Evening Standard	GB	2,213	44%	33%	12%	4%	–	3%	1%	2%	–	6%	11
9–11 Dec	Deltapoll	GB	1,818	45%	35%	10%	4%	–	3%	0%	4%	–	0%	10
9–11 Dec	Kantar	GB	2,815	44%	32%	13%	4%	–	3%	0%	3%	–	1%	12
6–11 Dec	BMG/The Independent	GB	1,660	41%	32%	14%	–	–	3%	–	4%	–	6%	9
9–10 Dec	SavantaComRes/The Daily Telegraph	GB	2,051	41%	36%	12%	4%	–	2%	–	3%	–	2%	5
8–10 Dec	Number Cruncher Politics/Bloomberg	GB	1,009	43%	33%	12%	4%	–	3%	1%	3%	–	1%	10
4–10 Dec	YouGov (MRP)	GB	105,612	43%	34%	12%	3%	–	3%	0%	3%	–	2%	9
27 Nov – 10 Dec	FocalData (MRP)	GB	21,213	42%	34%	14%	3%	–	3%	1%	3%	–	1%	8
6–9 Dec	ICM Research/Reuters	GB	2,011	42%	36%	12%	3%	0%	2%	0%	3%	–	1%	6
6–8 Dec	SavantaComRes/Remain United (Note: This poll does not feature constituency prompting.)	GB	6,073	43%	36%	12%	4%	–	2%	0%	3%	–	1%	7
5–8 Dec	Qriously	UK	2,222	43%	30%	12%	2%	–	4%	–	3%	–	5%	13
5–7 Dec	Survation/Good Morning Britain	UK	1,012	45%	31%	11%	3%	–	2%	1%	4%	–	3%	14
5–7 Dec	Deltapoll/The Mail on Sunday	GB	1,533	44%	33%	11%	4%	1%	2%	0%	3%	–	1%	11
5–6 Dec	YouGov/The Sunday Times	GB	1,680	43%	33%	13%	4%	–	3%	0%	3%	–	1%	10
4–6 Dec	BMG/The Independent	GB	1,542	41%	32%	14%	3%	0%	4%	0%	4%	0%	1%	9
4–6 Dec	Opinium/The Observer	GB	2,002	46%	31%	13%	4%	–	2%	0%	3%	–	1%	15
4–6 Dec	Panelbase	GB	2,033	43%	34%	13%	4%	–	2%	1%	3%	–	0%	9
4–5 Dec	SavantaComRes/The Sunday Telegraph	GB	2,034	41%	33%	12%	4%	–	2%	–	3%	–	5%	8
2–5 Dec	SavantaComRes/Remain United	GB	2,005	42%	36%	11%	3%	–	2%	–	4%	–	1%	6
2–4 Dec	Ipsos MORI/Evening Standard	GB	1,545	44%	32%	13%	4%	–	3%	1%	2%	–	1%	12
2–3 Dec	SavantaComRes/The Daily Telegraph	GB	2,041	42%	32%	12%	4%	–	2%	–	3%	–	5%	10
2–3 Dec	YouGov/The Times/Sky News	GB	1,699	42%	33%	12%	5%	–	4%	0%	4%	–	1%	9
29 Nov – 2 Dec	ICM Research	GB	2,029	42%	35%	13%	3%	–	2%	0%	3%	–	1%	7
28 Nov – 2 Dec	Kantar	GB	1,096	44%	32%	15%	3%	–	3%	1%	2%	–	1%	12
28–30 Nov	Deltapoll/The Mail on Sunday	GB	1,528	45%	32%	15%	3%	0%	1%	0%	3%	–	0%	13
26–30 Nov	Survation/Good Morning Britain	UK	1,065	42%	33%	11%	3%	–	4%	1%	3%	–	3%	9
28–29 Nov	YouGov/The Sunday Times	GB	1,680	43%	34%	13%	4%	–	3%	0%	2%	–	1%	9
27–29 Nov	Opinium/The Observer	GB	2,018	46%	31%	13%	4%	–	3%	0%	2%	–	2%	15
27–29 Nov	BMG/The Independent	GB	1,663	39%	33%	13%	4%	0%	5%	0%	4%	0%	1%	6
27–28 Nov	SavantaComRes/The Sunday Telegraph	GB	2,025	43%	33%	13%	3%	–	3%	–	4%	–	1%	10
27–28 Nov	Panelbase	GB	2,010	42%	34%	13%	3%	–	3%	0%	4%	–	1%	8
25–26 Nov	SavantaComRes/The Daily Telegraph	GB	2,034	41%	34%	13%	3%	–	2%	–	5%	–	1%	7
25–26 Nov	YouGov/The Times/Sky News	GB	1,678	43%	32%	13%	4%	–	2%	0%	4%	–	1%	11
22–25 Nov	ICM Research	GB	2,004	41%	34%	13%	3%	0%	3%	1%	4%	–	1%	7
21–25 Nov	Kantar	GB	1,097	43%	32%	14%	4%	–	4%	0%	3%	–	0%	11
21–23 Nov	Deltapoll/The Mail on Sunday	GB	1,519	43%	30%	16%	4%	–	3%	0%	3%	–	0%	13
20–23 Nov	Survation/Good Morning Britain	UK	1,010	41%	30%	15%	3%	–	3%	1%	5%	–	4%	11
21–22 Nov	YouGov/The Sunday Times	GB	1,677	42%	30%	16%	4%	–	4%	0%	3%	–	1%	12
20–22 Nov	Opinium/The Observer	GB	2,003	47%	28%	12%	5%	–	3%	0%	3%	–	2%	19
20–22 Nov	Panelbase	GB	2,028	42%	32%	14%	3%	–	3%	1%	3%	–	2%	10
20–21 Nov	SavantaComRes/Sunday Express	GB	2,038	42%	32%	15%	3%	–	2%	0%	5%	–	1%	10
19–21 Nov	BMG	GB	1,663	41%	28%	18%	2%	–	5%	0%	3%	–	1%	13
12–20 Nov	YouGov	GB	11,277	43%	29%	15%	4%	–	3%	1%	4%	–	2%	14
18–19 Nov	SavantaComRes/The Daily Telegraph	GB	1,628	42%	31%	15%	4%	–	2%	0%	5%	–	1%	11
18–19 Nov	YouGov/The Times	GB	1,606	42%	30%	15%	4%	–	4%	0%	4%	–	1%	12
15–19 Nov	Ipsos MORI/Evening Standard	GB	1,128	44%	28%	16%	4%	–	3%	1%	3%	–	1%	16
17–18 Nov	YouGov	GB	1,634	43%	29%	15%	4%	–	3%	1%	3%	–	3%	14
15–18 Nov	ICM Research	GB	2,010	42%	32%	13%	3%	–	3%	0%	5%	–	2%	10
14–18 Nov	Kantar	GB	1,176	45%	27%	16%	4%	–	3%	1%	2%	–	1%	18
14–16 Nov	Survation/Good Morning Britain	UK	1,010	42%	28%	13%	3%	–	3%	1%	5%	–	4%	14
14–16 Nov	Deltapoll/The Mail on Sunday	GB	1,526	45%	30%	11%	3%	2%	2%	0%	6%	0%	0%	15
14–15 Nov	YouGov/The Sunday Times	GB	1,670	45%	28%	15%	4%	–	3%	0%	4%	–	2%	17
13–15 Nov	Opinium/The Observer	GB	2,008	44%	28%	14%	4%	–	3%	1%	6%	–	0%	16
12–15 Nov	BMG/The Independent	GB	1,506	37%	29%	16%	2%	–	5%	0%	9%	–	0%	8
13–14 Nov	SavantaComRes/The Sunday Telegraph	GB	2,052	41%	33%	14%	3%	–	2%	0%	5%	–	1%	8
13–14 Nov	Panelbase	GB	1,021	43%	30%	15%	4%	–	2%	0%	5%	–	0%	13
11–12 Nov	SavantaComRes/The Daily Telegraph	GB	2,022	40%	30%	16%	4%	–	3%	0%	7%	–	1%	10
11–12 Nov	YouGov/The Times/Sky News	GB	1,619	42%	28%	15%	3%	–	4%	1%	4%	–	4%	14
8–11 Nov	ICM Research	GB	2,035	39%	31%	15%	3%	–	3%	0%	8%	–	2%	8
7–11 Nov	Kantar	GB	1,165	37%	27%	17%	3%	1%	3%	1%	9%	1%	1%	10
8–10 Nov	ComRes/Britain Elects	GB	2,014	37%	29%	17%	4%	–	3%	0%	9%	–	1%	8
6–9 Nov	Deltapoll/The Mail on Sunday	GB	1,518	41%	29%	16%	3%	1%	2%	0%	6%	0%	1%	12
7–8 Nov	YouGov/The Sunday Times	GB	1,598	39%	26%	17%	4%	–	4%	0%	10%	–	0%	13
6–8 Nov	Survation	UK	2,037	35%	29%	17%	4%	–	1%	1%	10%	–	3%	6
6–8 Nov	Opinium/The Observer	GB	2,001	41%	29%	15%	5%	–	2%	1%	6%	–	0%	12
6–8 Nov	Panelbase	GB	1,046	40%	30%	15%	4%	–	3%	0%	8%	–	0%	10
5–8 Nov	BMG/The Independent	GB	1,504	37%	29%	16%	2%	–	7%	0%	9%	–	0%	8
5–6 Nov	YouGov/The Times/Sky	GB	1,667	36%	25%	17%	4%	–	5%	1%	11%	–	1%	11
6 Nov		Parliament dissolved and official campaign period begins												
30 Oct – 5 Nov	ComRes/Remain United	GB	6,097	36%	29%	17%	4%	0%	3%	1%	11%	0%	0%	7
1–4 Nov	YouGov/The Times	GB	3,284	38%	25%	16%	4%	0%	5%	1%	11%	0%	0%	13
1–4 Nov	ICM Research/Reuters	GB	2,047	38%	31%	15%	3%	1%	3%	0%	9%	0%	1%	7
31 Oct – 2 Nov	Deltapoll/The Mail on Sunday	GB	1,500	40%	28%	14%	3%	1%	2%	1%	11%	0%	0%	12
30 Oct – 1 Nov	Opinium/The Observer	GB	2,004	42%	26%	16%	4%	0%	2%	1%	9%	0%	1%	16
30 Oct – 1 Nov	YouGov/The Sunday Times	GB	1,834	39%	27%	16%	5%	0%	4%	1%	7%	0%	1%	12
30–31 Oct	ComRes/Sunday Express	GB	2,032	36%	28%	17%	4%	0%	3%	0%	10%	0%	1%	8
30–31 Oct	ORB/The Sunday Telegraph	GB	2,025	36%	28%	14%	5%	0%	4%	0%	12%	0%	1%	8
30–31 Oct	Panelbase	GB	1,008	40%	29%	14%	3%	0%	3%	0%	9%	0%	1%	11
29–30 Oct	YouGov/The Times	GB	1,750	36%	21%	18%	4%	0%	6%	1%	13%	0%	1%	15
29–30 Oct	Survation/Daily Mail	UK	1,010	34%	26%	19%	4%	0%	1%	0%	12%	0%	4%	8
29 Oct		The House of Commons votes for an early general election												
25–28 Oct	Ipsos MORI/Evening Standard	GB	1,007	41%	24%	20%	4%	0%	3%	1%	7%	0%	0%	17
17–28 Oct	YouGov	GB	11,590	36%	22%	19%	4%	0%	6%	1%	12%	0%	0%	14
24–25 Oct	YouGov/The Times	GB	1,672	36%	23%	18%	4%	0%	6%	1%	12%	0%	0%	13
23–25 Oct	Opinium/The Observer	GB	2,001	40%	24%	15%	5%	1%	3%	0%	10%	0%	1%	16
20–21 Oct	YouGov/The Times	GB	1,689	37%	22%	19%	3%	1%	7%	1%	11%	0%	0%	15
18–21 Oct	Deltapoll	GB	2,017	37%	24%	19%	4%	1%	3%	1%	11%	0%	0%	13
17–18 Oct	Panelbase	GB	1,008	36%	27%	17%	4%	0%	3%	0%	11%	0%	0%	9
17–18 Oct	Survation/Daily Mail	UK	1,025	32%	24%	21%	4%	0%	2%	1%	13%	0%	4%	8
16–17 Oct	ComRes/Britain Elects	GB	2,067	33%	29%	18%	4%	0%	4%	1%	12%	0%	0%	4
15–17 Oct	Opinium/The Observer	GB	2,001	37%	24%	16%	4%	2%	4%	1%	12%	0%	1%	13
14–15 Oct	YouGov/The Times	GB	1,625	37%	22%	18%	4%	1%	5%	1%	11%	0%	0%	15
10–15 Oct	Kantar	GB	1,184	39%	25%	18%	3%	1%	3%	1%	8%	0%	1%	14
9–11 Oct	Panelbase/The Sunday Times	GB	2,013	33%	30%	17%	4%	0%	3%	0%	12%	0%	0%	3
9–10 Oct	ComRes/Daily Express	GB	2,018	33%	27%	18%	4%	0%	4%	0%	12%	0%	2%	6
8–9 Oct	YouGov/The Times	GB	1,616	35%	22%	20%	4%	0%	6%	1%	12%	1%	0%	13
4–7 Oct	ICM Research/Represent Us	GB	2,013	35%	29%	16%	3%	1%	4%	1%	11%	0%	1%	6
4–6 Oct	ComRes/The Daily Telegraph	GB	2,006	33%	27%	19%	4%	1%	3%	1%	13%	0%	1%	6
3–4 Oct	Opinium/The Observer	GB	2,006	38%	23%	15%	5%	1%	4%	0%	12%	0%	0%	15
1–4 Oct	BMG/The Independent	GB	1,514	31%	26%	20%	3%	0%	7%	1%	11%	0%	0%	5
30 Sep – 1 Oct	YouGov/The Times	GB	1,623	34%	21%	23%	3%	0%	5%	1%	12%	0%	1%	11
26–27 Sep	YouGov/The Sunday Times	GB	1,623	33%	22%	21%	4%	0%	5%	1%	13%	0%	1%	11
25–27 Sep	Opinium/The Observer	GB	2,007	36%	24%	20%	5%	0%	2%	1%	11%	0%	1%	12
25 Sep	Survation/Daily Mail	UK	1,011	27%	24%	22%	4%	0%	3%	0%	16%	0%	4%	3
24–25 Sep	YouGov/The Times	GB	1,635	33%	22%	22%	3%	0%	6%	1%	14%	0%	0%	11
19–20 Sep	YouGov/People's Vote	GB	2,006	30%	23%	22%	4%	0%	5%	0%	14%	0%	1%	7
19–20 Sep	Opinium/The Observer	GB	2,004	37%	22%	17%	4%	2%	4%	1%	12%	0%	0%	15
18–19 Sep	ComRes/Britain Elects	GB	2,050	29%	27%	20%	4%	0%	4%	0%	13%	1%	0%	2
17–18 Sep	YouGov/The Times	GB	1,608	32%	21%	23%	4%	1%	4%	1%	14%	0%	2%	9
13–16 Sep	Ipsos MORI/Evening Standard	GB	1,006	33%	24%	23%	4%				10%	0%	1%	9
11–13 Sep	Opinium/The Observer	GB	2,002	37%	25%	16%	4%	1%	2%	1%	13%	0%	0%	12
11–12 Sep	ComRes/Sunday Express	GB	2,057	28%	27%	20%	4%	1%	5%	1%	13%	1%	0%	1
9–10 Sep	YouGov/The Times	GB	1,676	32%	23%	19%	4%	0%	7%	0%	14%	0%	1%	9
5–9 Sep	Kantar	GB	1,144	38%	24%	20%	4%	1%	3%	1%	7%	1%	1%	14
6–8 Sep	ComRes/The Daily Telegraph	GB	2,016	30%	29%	17%	3%	1%	4%	1%	13%	0%	2%	1
5–7 Sep	Deltapoll/The Sun on Sunday	GB	2,049	31%	28%	17%	5%	1%	4%	1%	13%	0%	0%	3
5–6 Sep	YouGov/The Sunday Times	GB	1,676	35%	21%	19%	4%	1%	7%	0%	12%	0%	1%	14
5–6 Sep	Panelbase	GB	1,013	31%	28%	19%	3%	0%	2%	0%	15%	0%	0%	3
5–6 Sep	Survation/Daily Mail	UK	1,006	29%	24%	18%	4%	0%	3%	1%	17%	0%	5%	5
4–6 Sep	ComRes/Britain Elects	GB	2,009	31%	27%	20%	3%	1%	3%	1%	13%	0%	1%	4
4–6 Sep	Opinium/The Observer	GB	2,009	35%	25%	17%	5%	1%	3%	0%	13%	0%	1%	10
3–6 Sep	BMG/The Independent	GB	1,504	31%	27%	19%	3%	1%	6%	0%	13%	0%	0%	4
3–4 Sep	Hanbury Strategy	GB	995	33%	26%	17%	4%	0%	3%	1%	14%	0%	2%	7 (Note: Question specified an election taking place in October)
2–3 Sep	YouGov/The Times	GB	1,639	35%	25%	16%	4%	1%	7%	1%	11%	0%	0%	10
30 Aug – 3 Sep	ICM Research/Represent Us	GB	2,041	37%	30%	16%	3%	1%	4%	1%	9%	0%	1%	7
29–31 Aug	Deltapoll/The Mail on Sunday	GB	2,028	35%	24%	18%	4%	0%	4%	1%	14%	1%	0%	11
29–30 Aug	Survation/Daily Mail	UK	1,020	31%	24%	21%	4%	0%	3%	1%	14%	0%	3%	7
28–29 Aug	YouGov	GB	1,867	33%	22%	21%	4%	0%	7%	1%	12%	0%	1%	11
27–28 Aug	YouGov/The Times	GB	2,006	34%	22%	17%	4%	1%	8%	1%	13%	0%	1%	12
22–23 Aug	YouGov/The Sunday Times	GB	2,019	33%	21%	19%	4%	0%	7%	1%	14%	0%	1%	12
21–23 Aug	Opinium/The Observer	GB	2,005	32%	26%	15%	5%	1%	4%	1%	16%	0%	1%	6
20–21 Aug	YouGov/The Times	GB	1,687	32%	22%	20%	4%	0%	7%	1%	12%	0%	2%	10
15–19 Aug	Kantar	GB	1,133	42%	28%	15%	5%	0%	3%	0%	5%	1%	1%	14
13–14 Aug	YouGov/The Times	GB	1,625	30%	21%	20%	4%	1%	8%	1%	14%	0%	2%	9
7–12 Aug	BMG/The Independent	GB	1,515	31%	25%	19%	3%	1%	6%	1%	12%	0%	2%	6
9–11 Aug	ComRes/The Daily Telegraph	GB	2,011	31%	27%	16%	3%	1%	4%	0%	16%	0%	2%	4
6–11 Aug	Survation	UK	2,040	28%	24%	21%	4%	0%	3%	0%	15%	0%	4%	4
10 Aug		Richard Braine is elected leader of UKIP												
8–9 Aug	Opinium/The Observer	GB	2,003	31%	28%	13%	4%	1%	5%	1%	16%	0%	0%	3
5–6 Aug	YouGov/The Times	GB	1,628	31%	22%	21%	4%	0%	7%	0%	14%	0%	1%	9
1 Aug		Brecon and Radnorshire by-election (LD gain from Con)												
29–30 Jul	YouGov/The Times	GB	2,066	32%	22%	19%	4%	0%	8%	1%	13%	0%	1%	10
26–30 Jul	Ipsos MORI	GB	1,007	34%	24%	20%	4%	1%	6%	1%	9%	0%	1%	10
26–28 Jul	ComRes/Britain Elects	GB	2,004	29%	30%	16%	3%	1%	5%	1%	15%	0%	2%	1
25–27 Jul	Deltapoll/The Mail on Sunday	GB	2,001	30%	25%	18%	4%	1%	4%	1%	14%	2%	1%	5
25–26 Jul	YouGov/The Sunday Times	GB	1,697	31%	21%	20%	5%	0%	8%	1%	13%	0%	1%	10
24–26 Jul	Opinium/The Observer	GB	2,006	30%	28%	16%	5%	1%	5%	1%	15%	0%	1%	2
24–25 Jul	ComRes/Sunday Express	GB	2,029	28%	27%	19%	3%	1%	4%	1%	16%	0%	0%	1
23–24 Jul	YouGov/The Times	GB	1,715	25%	19%	23%	4%	1%	9%	1%	17%	0%	1%	2
23–24 Jul		Boris Johnson is elected leader of the Conservative Party and subsequently becomes Prime Minister												
22 Jul		Jo Swinson is elected leader of the Liberal Democrats												
16–17 Jul	YouGov/The Times	GB	1,749	25%	21%	20%	4%	0%	8%	1%	19%	0%	1%	4
15–16 Jul	ComRes/Britain Elects	GB	2,038	25%	28%	17%	4%	1%	5%	0%	19%	1%	1%	3
10–11 Jul	ComRes/Sunday Express	GB	1,791	24%	28%	15%	3%	1%	5%	1%	20%	1%	2%	4
10–11 Jul	Survation	GB	1,012	23%	29%	19%	4%	–	3%	1%	20%	–	1%	6
9–10 Jul	YouGov/The Times	GB	1,671	24%	20%	19%	5%	0%	9%	1%	21%	0%	1%	3
5–7 Jul	ComRes/The Daily Telegraph	GB	2,010	25%	28%	16%	3%	1%	5%	0%	19%	0%	1%	3
3–5 Jul	Opinium/The Observer	GB	2,002	23%	25%	15%	5%	1%	8%	1%	22%	1%	0%	2
2–5 Jul	BMG/The Independent	GB	1,532	28%	27%	18%	2%	2%	6%	1%	14%	1%	0%	1
2–3 Jul	YouGov/The Times	GB	1,605	24%	18%	20%	4%	0%	9%	1%	23%	0%	1%	1
24–25 Jun	YouGov/The Times	GB	2,059	22%	20%	19%	4%	1%	10%	1%	22%	0%	1%	Tie
21–25 Jun	Ipsos MORI	GB	1,043	26%	24%	22%	4%	1%	8%	1%	12%	0%	0%	2
19–20 Jun	Opinium/The Observer	GB	2,009	20%	26%	16%	4%	2%	6%	1%	23%	1%	1%	3
19–20 Jun	Survation/The Mail on Sunday	GB	2,016	24%	26%	18%	3%	1%	6%	1%	20%	1%	1%	2
18–19 Jun	YouGov/The Times	GB	1,641	20%	20%	21%	4%	1%	9%	1%	23%	0%	0%	2
13–14 Jun	YouGov/The Sunday Times	GB	1,672	21%	21%	19%	3%	0%	9%	1%	24%	0%	1%	3
9–10 Jun	YouGov/The Times	GB	1,702	17%	19%	22%	4%	0%	8%	1%	26%	1%	1%	4
7–9 Jun	ComRes/The Daily Telegraph	GB	2,017	23%	27%	17%	3%	1%	5%	1%	22%	1%	1%	4
4–7 Jun	BMG/The Independent	GB	1,520	26%	27%	17%	3%	1%	6%	1%	18%	1%	1%	1
6 Jun	Peterborough by-election (Lab hold)													
5–6 Jun	YouGov/The Times	GB	1,670	18%	20%	20%	5%	1%	9%	0%	26%	0%	0%	6
4–5 Jun	YouGov	GB	1,663	18%	19%	22%	4%	0%	9%	0%	25%	–	3%	3
4 Jun	Anna Soubry becomes leader of Change UK after six of its MPs leave the party													
31 May – 1 Jun	YouGov	GB	1,644	18%	19%	23%	5%	–	10%	0%	23%	–	2%	Tie
29–30 May	Deltapoll/The Mail on Sunday	GB	2,449	20%	26%	16%	4%	1%	5%	1%	24%	4%	1%	2
28–30 May	Opinium/The Observer	GB	2,005	17%	22%	16%	4%	1%	11%	1%	26%	1%	1%	4
28–29 May	YouGov/The Times	GB	1,763	19%	19%	24%	6%				22%	1%	0%	2
24 May	Theresa May announces her resignation as leader of the Conservative Party and Prime Minister, triggering a leadership election													
23 May	European Parliament election													
22 May	Survation/Daily Mail	UK	2,029	28%	33%	13%	3%	3%	3%	0%	12%	2%	3%	5
18–21 May	Number Cruncher Politics	GB	1,005	27%	31%	15%	5%	1%	4%	1%	14%	2%	0%	4
14–21 May	Panelbase/The Sunday Times	GB	2,033	21%	31%	13%	4%	3%	5%	0%	19%	4%	0%	10
17–20 May	Opinium	GB	2,005	22%	26%	12%	4%	2%	4%	1%	25%	2%	0%	1
17 May	Survation/Daily Mail	UK	1,000	27%	32%	13%	5%	2%	3%	0%	13%	2%	4%	5
8–17 May	YouGov/Best for Britain/Hope Not Hate	GB	9,260	24%	24%	18%	4%	2%	6%	1%	18%	2%	1%	Tie
14–16 May	Opinium/The Observer	GB	2,009	22%	29%	11%	4%	2%	3%	0%	24%	3%	1%	5
13–14 May	YouGov/The Times	GB	1,655	25%	25%	16%	5%				18%	2%	1%	Tie
10–14 May	Ipsos MORI	GB	1,072	25%	27%	15%	4%	3%	7%	1%	16%	2%	1%	2
9–13 May	Hanbury Strategy/Politico	GB	2,000	21%	30%	13%	4%	2%	5%	–	19%	6%	1%	9
9–13 May	Kantar	GB	1,152	25%	34%	15%	5%	4%	3%	2%	10%	1%	2%	9
10–12 May	ComRes/The Daily Telegraph	GB	2,028	20%	27%	13%	3%	4%	4%	0%	20%	6%	1%	7
8–10 May	Opinium/The Observer	GB	2,004	22%	28%	11%	4%	4%	6%	0%	21%	4%	0%	6
7–10 May	BMG/The Independent	GB	1,541	27%	30%	18%	2%	3%	6%	0%	10%	3%	1%	3
9 May	ComRes/Brexit Express	GB	2,034	19%	27%	14%	3%	3%	5%	1%	20%	7%	1%	8
8–9 May	YouGov/The Times	GB	2,212	24%	24%	16%	5%				18%	2%	1%	Tie
3–7 May	Opinium/People's Vote	GB	2,000	25%	30%	11%	3%	4%	5%	1%	17%	2%	1%	5
2 May	Local elections in England and Northern Ireland													
29–30 Apr	YouGov	GB	1,630	29%	29%	13%	4%				15%	3%	1%	Tie
23–24 Apr	YouGov/The Times	GB	1,787	27%	30%	11%	5%				14%	3%	1%	3
18–24 Apr	Panelbase/The Sunday Times	GB	2,030	27%	36%	8%	4%	5%	3%	–	13%	4%	1%	9
21–23 Apr	Opinium/The Observer	GB	2,004	26%	33%	6%	5%	4%	4%	1%	17%	4%	1%	7
16–17 Apr	ORB/The Daily Telegraph	UK	1,546	26%	29%	8%	4%	5%	4%	1%	14%	5%	4% (Note: Including the Democratic Unionist Party and Sinn Féin with 1%)	3
16–17 Apr	YouGov/The Times	GB	1,755	29%	30%	10%	5%				12%	3%	2%	1
16 Apr	ComRes/Brexit Express	GB	1,061	23%	33%	7%	3%	5%	3%	1%	14%	9%	1%	10
9–12 Apr	Opinium/The Observer	GB	2,007	29%	36%	8%	5%	11%	4%	1%	–	–	6%	7
10–11 Apr	YouGov/The Times	GB	1,843	28%	32%	11%	5%				8%	3%	2%	4
5–8 Apr	Hanbury Strategy/Open Europe	GB	2,000	31%	40%	8%	4%	8%	5%	1%	–	–	4%	9
4–8 Apr	Kantar	GB	1,172	32%	35%	11%	5%	7%	4%	1%	–	–	6%	3
3–8 Apr	Survation	E+W	6,062	37%	41%	10%	–	7%	2%	1%	–	1%	2%	4
5–7 Apr	ComRes/The Daily Telegraph	GB	2,018	32%	32%	7%	3%	9%	3%	0%	–	9%	3%	Tie
2–5 Apr	BMG/The Independent	GB	1,500	29%	31%	8%	3%	7%	4%	1%	6%	8%	1%	2
2–5 Apr	BMG/The Independent	GB	1,500	35%	34%	11%	4%	6%	5%	1%	–	–	3%	1
4 Apr	Newport West by-election (Lab hold)													
2–3 Apr	YouGov/The Times	GB	1,771	32%	31%	12%	6%				5%	–	3%	1
28–30 Mar	Deltapoll/The Mail on Sunday	GB	1,010	32%	35%	7%	2%	6%	2%	1%	6%	9%	1%	3
28–30 Mar	Deltapoll/The Mail on Sunday	GB	1,010	36%	41%	7%	3%	7%	3%	1%	–	–	3%	5
28–29 Mar	Opinium/The Observer	GB	2,008	35%	35%	9%	4%	9%	5%	0%	–	–	3%	Tie
24–25 Mar	YouGov/The Times	GB	2,110	36%	33%	11%	5%				5%	–	2%	3
22–24 Mar	ComRes/Leave Means Leave	GB	2,030	33%	33%	8%	3%	7%	3%	1%	–	9%	3%	Tie
20–22 Mar	Opinium/The Observer	GB	2,002	36%	35%	7%	5%	9%	4%	1%	–	–	3%	1
20–21 Mar	ComRes/Daily Express	GB	2,063	34%	35%	8%	3%	7%	4%	1%	–	6%	3%	1
15–19 Mar	Ipsos MORI	GB	1,050	38%	34%	8%	5%	7%	4%	1%	1%	2%	0%	4
15–17 Mar	ComRes/The Daily Telegraph	GB	2,033	34%	35%	8%	3%	6%	3%	1%	–	7%	3%	1
15 Mar	Survation/Daily Mail	UK	1,007	35%	39%	10%	3%	–	–	0%	–	–	12%	4
14–15 Mar	YouGov/People's Vote	GB	1,823	35%	33%	11%	–	–	–	–	–	–	21%	2
14–15 Mar	YouGov/The Times	GB	1,756	35%	31%	12%	4%				4%	–	2%	4
13–15 Mar	Opinium/The Observer	GB	2,003	35%	35%	7%	5%	8%	4%	0%	–	4%	2%	Tie
12–15 Mar	Opinium/The Observer	GB	2,008	38%	34%	8%	5%	8%	3%	1%	–	–	3%	4
7–11 Mar	Kantar	GB	1,152	41%	31%	8%	5%	6%	6%	0%	–	–	2%	10
4–8 Mar	BMG/The Independent	GB	1,510	37%	31%	10%	3%	6%	5%	1%	–	5%	1%	6
4–8 Mar	BMG/The Independent	GB	1,510	39%	34%	12%	3%	5%	4%	1%	–	–	2%	5
4–5 Mar	ComRes/Brexit Express	GB	2,042	36%	34%	8%	3%	6%	3%	0%	–	8%	2%	2
3–4 Mar	YouGov/The Times	GB	2,172	40%	31%	11%	5%				3%	–	3%	9
26 Feb – 1 Mar	Opinium/The Observer	GB	2,004	37%	33%	7%	4%	7%	4%	1%	–	5%	2%	4
26 Feb – 1 Mar	Opinium/The Observer	GB	2,003	40%	34%	9%	4%	7%	3%	1%	–	–	3%	6
22–23 Feb	YouGov/The Times	GB	1,672	41%	30%	10%	5%				2%	–	3%	11
22–23 Feb	YouGov/The Times	GB	1,672	36%	23%	6%	–	–	–	–	–	18%	16%	13
21–23 Feb	Deltapoll/The Mail on Sunday	GB	1,027	39%	31%	5%	5%	4%	3%	0%	–	11%	1%	8
21–23 Feb	Deltapoll/The Mail on Sunday	GB	1,027	43%	36%	6%	4%	5%	3%	0%	–	–	2%	7
20–22 Feb	Opinium/The Observer	GB	2,008	40%	32%	5%	4%	7%	4%	1%	–	6%	2%	8
19 Feb	Sky Data	UK	1,034	32%	26%	9%	4%	6%	4%	1%	–	10%	7%	6
18–19 Feb	YouGov/The Times	GB	1,861	38%	26%	7%	–	–	–	–	–	14%	15%	12
18–19 Feb	YouGov/The Times	GB	1,861	41%	33%	10%	5%				–	–	3%	8
18 Feb	Survation/Daily Mail	UK	1,023	40%	36%	10%	3%	5%	2%	–	–	–	5%	4
18 Feb	Eight Labour MPs, soon joined by three Conservatives, quit their parties to form Change UK													
13–15 Feb	Opinium/The Observer	GB	2,005	37%	37%	8%	4%	7%	4%	0%	–	–	2%	Tie
7–11 Feb	Kantar	GB	1,145	40%	35%	10%	4%	3%	4%	1%	–	–	3%	5
4–8 Feb	BMG	GB	1,503	38%	35%	13%	3%	5%	5%	1%	–	–	1%	3
2–7 Feb	YouGov/The Times	GB	40,119	39%	34%	11%	3%	5%	4%	1%	–	–	2%	5
5 Feb	The Brexit Party is registered with the Electoral Commission													
1–5 Feb	Ipsos MORI	GB	1,005	38%	38%	10%	4%	4%	3%	1%	–	–	3%	Tie
3–4 Feb	YouGov/The Times	GB	1,851	41%	34%	10%	4%	4%	4%	0%	–	–	2%	7
30 Jan – 1 Feb	Opinium/The Observer	GB	2,008	41%	34%	8%	4%	7%	4%	1%	–	–	1%	7
30 Jan	Survation/Daily Mail	UK	1,029	38%	39%	9%	3%	4%	2%	0%	–	–	4%	1
23–25 Jan	Opinium/People's Vote	GB	2,001	40%	36%	7%	3%	7%	4%	0%	–	–	1%	4
16–18 Jan	ICM	GB	2,046	39%	40%	9%	3%	5%	3%	0%	–	–	1%	1
16–18 Jan	Opinium/The Observer	GB	2,006	37%	40%	7%	5%	7%	4%	1%	–	–	1%	3
16–17 Jan	ComRes/Sunday Mirror/Sunday Express	GB	2,031	38%	37%	10%	3%	6%	3%	1%	–	–	1%	1
10–17 Jan	Number Cruncher Politics	UK	1,030	41%	39%	8%	3%	4%	2%	1%	–	–	1%	2
14–15 Jan	ComRes/Daily Express	GB	2,010	37%	39%	8%	3%	7%	3%	0%	–	–	1%	2
13–14 Jan	YouGov/The Times	GB	1,701	39%	34%	11%	4%	6%	4%	1%	–	–	1%	5
10–14 Jan	Kantar	GB	1,106	35%	38%	9%	4%	6%	4%	1%	–	–	3%	3
10–11 Jan	Survation/Daily Mail	UK	1,013	38%	41%	10%	3%	4%	2%	0%	–	–	3%	3
8–11 Jan	BMG/The Independent	GB	1,514	36%	36%	12%	3%	6%	5%	1%	–	–	1%	Tie
6–7 Jan	YouGov/The Times	GB	1,656	41%	35%	11%	4%	4%	3%	0%	–	–	1%	6
21 Dec 2018 – 4 Jan 2019	YouGov/People's Vote	UK	25,537	40%	34%	10%	4%	4%	4%	0%	–	–	2%	6

=== 2018 ===
Date(s) conducted	Pollster/client(s)	Area	Sample size	Con	Lab	LD	SNP	PC	UKIP	Grn	Others	Lead
18–20 Dec	Opinium/The Observer	GB	2,000	39%	39%	6%	4%	0%	6%	4%	1%	Tie
16–17 Dec	YouGov/The Times	GB	1,660	41%	39%	7%	5%		4%	3%	1%	2
14–15 Dec	YouGov/Hope Not Hate	GB	1,660	38%	35%	10%	6%		4%	5%	2%	3
13–14 Dec	Opinium/The Observer	GB	2,016	38%	39%	8%	4%	1%	6%	4%	1%	1
12–14 Dec	YouGov/People's Vote	GB	5,043	40%	36%	10%	5%		4%	3%	1%	4
10–11 Dec	Populus/Best for Britain	GB	2,002	37%	40%	7%	3%	1%	6%	3%	1%	3
9–10 Dec	YouGov	GB	2,008	39%	38%	9%	5%		5%	4%	1%	1
6–7 Dec	YouGov/The Sunday Times	GB	1,652	38%	37%	10%	5%		3%	4%	1%	1
4–7 Dec	BMG/The Independent	GB	1,508	37%	38%	12%	3%	1%	4%	4%	1%	1
5–6 Dec	Kantar	GB	1,178	38%	38%	9%	4%	1%	5%	5%	1%	Tie
30 Nov – 5 Dec	Ipsos MORI	GB	1,049	38%	38%	9%	4%	1%	4%	5%	1%	Tie
3–4 Dec	YouGov/The Times	GB	1,624	40%	38%	9%	5%		4%	4%	1%	2
30 Nov – 2 Dec	ComRes/Daily Express	GB	2,035	37%	39%	9%	3%	0%	6%	3%	1%	2
26–27 Nov	YouGov/The Times	GB	1,737	40%	35%	10%	4%		6%	3%	1%	5
18–19 Nov	YouGov/The Times	GB	1,671	39%	36%	8%	6%		4%	4%	1%	3
14–15 Nov	ComRes/Sunday Mirror/Sunday Express	GB	2,000	36%	40%	9%	3%	1%	7%	3%	1%	4
14–15 Nov	Opinium/The Observer	GB	2,003	36%	39%	7%	5%	1%	8%	3%	1%	3
8–12 Nov	Kantar	GB	1,147	40%	39%	8%	4%	1%	3%	3%	2%	1
6–9 Nov	BMG/The Independent	GB	1,506	36%	37%	12%	3%	1%	6%	4%	1%	1
2–7 Nov	Panelbase/Constitutional Commission	GB	2,016	40%	40%	8%	4%	1%	5%	3%	–	Tie
4–5 Nov	YouGov/The Times	GB	1,637	41%	37%	8%	4%		4%	4%	1%	4
20 Oct – 2 Nov	Survation/Channel 4	UK	20,090	39%	40%	8%	3%	–	3%	2%	3%	1
29–30 Oct	YouGov/The Times	GB	1,648	41%	39%	7%	4%		5%	2%	0%	2
26–28 Oct	ICM	GB	2,048	40%	38%	9%	3%	1%	5%	3%	0%	2
24–26 Oct	Deltapoll/Daily Mirror	GB	1,017	43%	40%	6%	4%	0%	5%	2%	0%	3
22–23 Oct	YouGov/The Times	GB	1,802	41%	36%	8%	6%		4%	4%	1% (Note: Including the British National Party with 1%)	5
19–22 Oct	Ipsos MORI	GB	1,044	39%	37%	10%	4%	1%	5%	5%	0%	2
14–15 Oct	YouGov/The Times	GB	1,649	41%	36%	9%	4%		4%	3%	1%	5
11–15 Oct	Kantar	GB	1,128	41%	36%	10%	4%	1%	3%	4%	2%	5
11–12 Oct	Opinium/The Observer	GB	2,010	41%	37%	8%	4%	1%	6%	3%	1%	4
10 Oct	Survation	UK	1,009	40%	39%	7%	4%	–	6%	–	5%	1
8–9 Oct	YouGov/The Times	GB	1,647	41%	37%	9%	5%		4%	3%	2% (Note: Women's Equality Party on 1%)	4
3–5 Oct	BMG/The Independent	GB	1,503	38%	39%	10%	4%	1%	4%	4%	0%	1
3–5 Oct	Opinium/The Observer	GB	2,007	39%	39%	7%	3%	1%	6%	3%	1%	Tie
30 Sep – 1 Oct	YouGov/The Times	GB	1,607	42%	36%	9%	4%		5%	2%	2%	6
28–29 Sep	BMG/HuffPost UK	GB	1,203	35%	40%	12%	4%	1%	5%	3%	1%	5
28 Sep	Adam Price is elected leader of Plaid Cymru											
26–28 Sep	Opinium/The Observer	GB	2,008	39%	36%	9%	4%	0%	6%	3%	1%	3
26–27 Sep	ComRes/Daily Express	GB	2,036	39%	40%	9%	3%	1%	5%	2%	1%	1
24–25 Sep	YouGov/The Times	GB	1,625	42%	36%	11%	4%		4%	2%	0%	6
21–24 Sep	ICM/The Guardian	GB	2,006	41%	40%	9%	3%	0%	4%	3%	0%	1
21–22 Sep	BMG/HuffPost UK	GB	1,006	38%	38%	10%	4%	0%	5%	4%	0%	Tie
18–20 Sep	Opinium/The Observer	GB	2,003	37%	39%	9%	4%	1%	8%	2%	1%	2
18–19 Sep	YouGov/The Times	GB	2,509	40%	36%	11%	5%		5%	2%	1%	4
14–18 Sep	Ipsos MORI	GB	1,070	39%	37%	13%	3%	0%	2%	5%	1%	2
12–13 Sep	YouGov/The Times	GB	1,620	40%	36%	11%	4%		4%	3%	1%	4
11–13 Sep	Opinium/The Observer	GB	2,011	39%	38%	7%	4%	1%	6%	3%	1%	1
6–10 Sep	Kantar	GB	1,119	40%	35%	10%	4%	0%	5%	4%	1%	5
7–9 Sep	ICM/The Guardian	GB	2,051	42%	39%	8%	3%	0%	4%	3%	0%	3
7 Sep	Survation/Daily Mail	UK	1,039	38%	37%	10%	3%	1%	4%	1%	5%	1
4–7 Sep	BMG/The Independent	GB	1,533	37%	38%	11%	2%	1%	7%	4%	1%	1
4 Sep	Siân Berry is elected co-leader of the Green Party											
3–4 Sep	YouGov/The Times	GB	1,883	39%	35%	11%	5%		5%	4%	1%	4
31 Aug – 1 Sep	Survation	UK	1,017	37%	41%	6%	3%	1%	7%	2%	3%	4
28–29 Aug	YouGov/The Times	GB	1,664	39%	37%	10%	4%		5%	3%	2%	2
20–21 Aug	YouGov/The Times	GB	1,697	40%	37%	9%	5%		6%	2%	2%	3
17–19 Aug	ICM/The Guardian	GB	2,021	40%	40%	8%	3%	0%	6%	2%	1%	Tie
14–17 Aug	Opinium/The Observer	GB	2,003	39%	38%	7%	4%	1%	7%	3%	1%	1
14–16 Aug	Deltapoll/The Sun on Sunday	GB	1,904	37%	40%	8%	3%	1%	6%	5%	1%	3
13–14 Aug	YouGov/The Times	GB	1,660	41%	38%	8%	4%		6%	3%	1%	3
9–13 Aug	Kantar	GB	1,119	40%	39%	9%	4%	1%	4%	3%	1%	1
9–13 Aug	Number Cruncher Politics	UK	1,036	38%	40%	8%	4%	1%	5%	2%	1%	2
6–10 Aug	BMG/The Independent	GB	1,481	37%	39%	10%	3%	0%	5%	5%	0%	2
8–9 Aug	YouGov/The Times	GB	1,675	39%	35%	10%	5%		7%	3%	1%	4
3–5 Aug	ICM/The Guardian	GB	2,049	39%	40%	7%	4%	0%	6%	3%	0%	1
30–31 Jul	YouGov/The Times	GB	1,718	38%	38%	10%	4%		6%	3%	1%	Tie
20–24 Jul	Ipsos MORI	GB	1,023	38%	38%	10%	4%	1%	6%	3%	1%	Tie
22–23 Jul	YouGov/The Times	GB	1,650	38%	38%	10%	4%		6%	3%	0%	Tie
20–22 Jul	ICM/The Guardian	GB	2,010	40%	41%	8%	3%	0%	5%	3%	1%	1
19–20 Jul	YouGov/The Sunday Times	GB	1,668	38%	39%	9%	5%		6%	2%	1%	1
16–17 Jul	YouGov/The Times	GB	1,657	36%	41%	9%	4%		7%	2%	0%	5
12–14 Jul	Deltapoll/The Sun on Sunday	GB	1,484	37%	42%	7%	3%	1%	6%	3%	1%	5
10–13 Jul	Opinium/The Observer	GB	2,005	36%	40%	8%	4%	1%	8%	3%	1%	4
10–11 Jul	YouGov/The Times	GB	1,732	37%	39%	10%	4%		6%	3%	1%	2
8–9 Jul	YouGov/The Times	GB	1,669	39%	39%	9%	4%		5%	3%	1%	Tie
6–9 Jul	ICM/The Guardian	GB	2,013	41%	39%	9%	3%	0%	4%	3%	1%	2
5–9 Jul	Kantar	GB	1,086	40%	38%	9%	4%	1%	3%	3%	2%	2
7 Jul	Survation/The Mail on Sunday	UK	1,007	38%	40%	10%	3%	1%	–	–	8%	2
3–5 Jul	BMG/The Independent	GB	1,511	39%	37%	10%	3%	1%	3%	4%	1%	2
3–4 Jul	YouGov/The Times	GB	1,641	41%	40%	9%	4%		3%	2%	1%	1
22–27 Jun	Ipsos MORI	GB	1,026	41%	38%	7%	4%	1%	4%	4%	1%	3
25–26 Jun	YouGov/The Times	GB	1,645	42%	37%	9%	5%		3%	3%	1%	5
22–24 Jun	ICM/The Guardian	GB	2,013	41%	40%	9%	3%	1%	3%	3%	1%	1
19–20 Jun	Survation/Good Morning Britain	UK	1,022	41%	38%	7%	4%	1%	3%	3%	3%	3
18–19 Jun	YouGov/The Times	GB	1,606	42%	40%	9%	4%		3%	2%	0%	2
14 Jun	Lewisham East by-election (Lab hold)											
11–12 Jun	YouGov/The Times	GB	1,638	42%	39%	8%	4%		3%	2%	1%	3
8–10 Jun	ICM/The Guardian	GB	2,021	42%	40%	8%	3%	0%	3%	3%	0%	2
5–8 Jun	BMG/The Independent	GB	1,490	38%	41%	11%	2%	0%	4%	2%	1%	3
5–7 Jun	Opinium/The Observer	GB	2,005	42%	40%	7%	6%	1%	3%	2%	1%	2
4–5 Jun	YouGov/The Times	GB	1,619	44%	37%	8%	4%		3%	3%	0%	7
31 May – 4 Jun	Survation	UK	2,012	41%	40%	9%	3%	1%	2%	2%	3%	1
30 May – 1 Jun	Deltapoll/The Sun on Sunday	GB	1,013	41%	41%	6%	4%	0%	5%	2%	1%	Tie
28–29 May	YouGov/The Times	GB	1,670	42%	39%	9%	5%		3%	2%	1%	3
25–29 May	ICM/The Guardian	GB	2,002	43%	40%	8%	3%	1%	3%	2%	1%	3
18–22 May	Ipsos MORI	GB	1,015	40%	40%	7%	5%	0%	2%	5%	0%	Tie
20–21 May	YouGov/The Times	GB	1,660	42%	38%	9%	4%		2%	3%	1%	4
16–17 May	ComRes/We, The People	GB	2,045	41%	41%	7%	3%	1%	3%	3%	1%	Tie
15–16 May	Opinium/The Observer	GB	2,009	43%	39%	6%	4%	1%	4%	3%	1%	4
13–14 May	YouGov/The Times	GB	1,634	43%	38%	9%	3%		3%	3%	1%	5
11–13 May	ICM/The Guardian	GB	2,050	43%	40%	8%	3%	0%	3%	3%	1%	3
8–10 May	Survation	UK	1,585	41%	40%	8%	3%	1%	3%	2%	2%	1
8–9 May	YouGov/The Times	GB	1,648	43%	38%	9%	4%		2%	2%	1%	5
1–4 May	BMG/The Independent	GB	1,441	39%	39%	10%	4%	1%	4%	3%	1%	Tie
3 May	English local and mayoral elections and West Tyrone by-election (SF hold)											
30 Apr – 1 May	YouGov/The Times	GB	1,585	42%	38%	7%	4%		3%	3%	1%	4
27–29 Apr	ComRes/Daily Express	GB	2,030	40%	40%	9%	3%	0%	5%	3%	1%	Tie
27–29 Apr	ICM/The Guardian	GB	2,026	42%	39%	8%	3%	0%	4%	3%	1%	3
24–25 Apr	YouGov/The Times	GB	1,668	43%	38%	8%	4%		3%	3%	0%	5
20–24 Apr	Ipsos MORI	GB	1,004	41%	40%	10%	3%	1%	2%	2%	1%	1
16–17 Apr	YouGov/The Times	GB	1,631	43%	38%	8%	4%		3%	3%	1%	5
14 Apr	Survation/The Mail on Sunday	UK	2,060	40%	40%	9%	3%	1%	3%	1%	3%	Tie
14 Apr	Gerard Batten is elected leader of UKIP											
11–13 Apr	BMG	GB	1,500	39%	38%	11%	4%	0%	3%	4%	1%	1
11–12 Apr	ComRes/Sunday Express	GB	2,038	40%	41%	7%	3%	1%	4%	2%	1%	1
10–12 Apr	Opinium/The Observer	GB	2,008	40%	40%	7%	4%	1%	5%	2%	1%	Tie
9–10 Apr	YouGov/The Times	GB	1,639	40%	40%	9%	4%		4%	2%	1%	Tie
6–8 Apr	ICM/The Guardian	GB	2,012	42%	41%	7%	3%	0%	4%	3%	0%	1
4–5 Apr	YouGov/The Times	GB	1,662	42%	41%	7%	4%		4%	2%	1%	1
27 Mar – 5 Apr	Number Cruncher Politics	UK	1,037	43%	38%	8%	4%	1%	3%	3%	0%	5
26–27 Mar	YouGov/The Times	GB	1,659	43%	39%	8%	3%		3%	2%	1%	4
16–18 Mar	ICM/The Guardian	GB	2,013	44%	41%	8%	3%	1%	1%	2%	1%	3
13–16 Mar	BMG	GB	2,065	38%	40%	10%	4%	0%	4%	3%	1%	2
14–15 Mar	YouGov/The Times	GB	1,986	42%	39%	7%	5%		3%	3%	1%	3
13–15 Mar	Opinium/The Observer	GB	2,001	42%	40%	6%	4%	1%	4%	3%	0%	2
7–8 Mar	Survation/GMB	UK	1,038	37%	44%	9%	3%	0%	3%	2%	3%	7
2–7 Mar	Ipsos MORI	GB	1,012	43%	42%	6%	4%	1%	2%	2%	0%	1
5–6 Mar	YouGov/The Times	GB	1,641	41%	43%	7%	4%		2%	2%	1%	2
2–4 Mar	ICM/The Guardian	GB	2,030	43%	42%	7%	3%	0%	2%	3%	0%	1
26–27 Feb	YouGov/The Times	GB	1,622	41%	42%	7%	4%		3%	2%	1%	1
19–20 Feb	YouGov/The Times	GB	1,650	40%	42%	8%	4%		4%	2%	0%	2
16–19 Feb	ICM/The Guardian	GB	2,027	42%	43%	7%	3%	0%	3%	2%	0%	1
12–13 Feb	YouGov/The Times	GB	1,639	40%	41%	8%	3%		4%	2%	1%	1
6–12 Feb	Kantar	GB	2,448	39%	39%	8%	4%	1%	4%	2%	2%	Tie
6–9 Feb	BMG	GB	1,507	40%	40%	8%	2%	0%	5%	4%	1%	Tie
6–8 Feb	Opinium/The Observer	GB	2,002	42%	39%	7%	4%	1%	5%	2%	1%	3
5–6 Feb	YouGov/The Times	GB	2,000	43%	39%	8%	3%		3%	3%	1%	4
2–4 Feb	ICM/The Guardian	GB	2,021	41%	40%	8%	3%	0%	4%	3%	1%	1
28–29 Jan	YouGov/The Times	GB	1,669	42%	42%	6%	4%		2%	3%	1%	Tie
26–29 Jan	Survation	UK	1,059	40%	43%	8%	2%	0%	3%	1%	3%	3
19–23 Jan	Ipsos MORI	GB	1,031	39%	42%	9%	4%	0%	3%	2%	1%	3
10–19 Jan	ICM/The Guardian	GB	5,075	41%	41%	7%	3%	0%	4%	3%	0%	Tie
16–17 Jan	YouGov/The Times	GB	1,672	41%	42%	7%	4%		3%	2%	0%	1
12–14 Jan	ICM/The Guardian	GB	2,027	40%	41%	7%	3%	1%	4%	3%	0%	1
11–12 Jan	Opinium/The Observer	GB	2,008	40%	40%	6%	4%	0%	5%	3%	1%	Tie
9–12 Jan	BMG	GB	1,513	40%	41%	8%	3%	1%	4%	2%	1%	1
7–8 Jan	YouGov/The Times	GB	1,663	40%	41%	9%	4%		3%	2%	0%	1

=== 2017 ===
Date(s) conducted	Pollster/client(s)	Area	Sample size	Con	Lab	LD	SNP	PC	UKIP	Grn	Others	Lead
19–20 Dec	YouGov/The Times	GB	1,610	40%	42%	7%	5%		4%	1%	0%	2
12–14 Dec	ICM/The Sun on Sunday	GB	2,004	41%	42%	7%	3%	0%	4%	3%	0%	1
12–14 Dec	Opinium/The Observer	GB	2,005	39%	41%	7%	4%	1%	6%	2%	1%	2
10–11 Dec	YouGov/The Times	GB	1,680	42%	41%	7%	4%		4%	2%	2%	1
8–10 Dec	ICM/The Guardian	GB	2,006	42%	40%	8%	3%	1%	5%	2%	0%	2
5–8 Dec	BMG/The Independent	GB	1,509	37%	40%	9%	3%	1%	5%	3%	1%	3
4–5 Dec	YouGov/The Times	GB	1,638	40%	41%	7%	4%		3%	2%	2%	1
30 Nov – 1 Dec	Survation/The Mail on Sunday	UK	1,003	37%	45%	6%	3%	0%	4%	1%	3%	8
29 Nov – 1 Dec	ICM/The Sun on Sunday	GB	2,050	40%	41%	8%	3%	0%	4%	3%	0%	1
24–28 Nov	Ipsos MORI	GB	1,003	37%	39%	9%	4%	1%	4%	4%	1%	2
24–26 Nov	ICM/The Guardian	GB	2,029	41%	41%	7%	3%	0%	5%	3%	0%	Tie
22–23 Nov	YouGov/The Times	GB	1,644	39%	41%	7%	4%		4%	3%	1%	2
19–20 Nov	YouGov/The Times	GB	1,677	40%	43%	7%	4%		3%	2%	0%	3
14–20 Nov	Kantar	GB	2,437	42%	38%	9%	2%	0%	5%	3%	1%	4
14–17 Nov	BMG	GB	1,507	40%	41%	8%	–	–	4%	–	7%	1
14–16 Nov	Opinium/The Observer	GB	2,032	40%	42%	6%	4%	1%	5%	2%	0%	2
10–12 Nov	ICM/The Guardian	GB	2,010	41%	41%	7%	4%	0%	4%	2%	0%	Tie
7–8 Nov	YouGov/The Times	GB	2,012	40%	43%	6%	4%		4%	2%	1%	3
27 Oct – 1 Nov	Ipsos MORI	GB	1,052	38%	40%	9%	4%	1%	4%	3%	1%	2
23–24 Oct	YouGov/The Times	GB	1,637	41%	43%	7%	4%		3%	2%	0%	2
20–23 Oct	ICM/The Guardian	GB	2,022	42%	42%	7%	3%	0%	3%	2%	0%	Tie
17–20 Oct	BMG	GB	1,506	37%	42%	10%	–	–	4%	–	7%	5
18–19 Oct	YouGov/The Times	GB	1,648	40%	42%	8%	4%		4%	2%	1%	2
10–11 Oct	YouGov/The Times	GB	1,680	39%	42%	8%	4%		4%	2%	0%	3
6–8 Oct	ICM/The Guardian	GB	2,052	41%	41%	7%	4%	1%	4%	2%	0%	Tie
4–6 Oct	Opinium/The Observer	GB	2,009	40%	42%	5%	4%	0%	5%	2%	1%	2
4–5 Oct	Survation	UK	2,047	38%	44%	7%	3%	1%	4%	1%	2%	6
4–5 Oct	YouGov/The Times	GB	1,615	40%	42%	7%	4%		4%	2%	1%	2
29 Sep	Henry Bolton is elected leader of UKIP											
26–29 Sep	BMG/The Independent	GB	1,910	37%	42%	10%	3%	0%	4%	3%	1%	5
22–24 Sep	ICM/The Guardian	GB	1,968	40%	42%	8%	3%	1%	4%	2%	1%	2
22–24 Sep	YouGov/The Times	GB	1,716	39%	43%	7%	4%		4%	2%	0%	4
22 Sep	Survation/The Mail on Sunday	UK	1,174	38%	42%	8%	4%	1%	4%	2%	2%	4
19–22 Sep	Opinium/The Observer	GB	2,004	42%	40%	6%	4%	1%	4%	2%	1%	2
15–20 Sep	Survation/LabourList	UK	1,614	40%	41%	7%	3%	1%	5%	2%	1%	1
15–18 Sep	Ipsos MORI	GB	1,023	40%	44%	9%	4%	0%	2%	1%	0%	4
12–15 Sep	BMG/The Independent	GB	1,447	39%	38%	8%	3%	0%	6%	4%	1%	1
12–15 Sep	Opinium/The Observer	GB	2,009	41%	41%	5%	4%	1%	5%	3%	0%	Tie
12–13 Sep	YouGov/The Times	GB	1,660	41%	42%	7%	4%		3%	2%	1%	1
8–10 Sep	ICM/The Guardian	GB	2,052	42%	42%	7%	3%	0%	4%	3%	0%	Tie
31 Aug – 1 Sep	Survation/The Mail on Sunday	UK	1,046	38%	43%	7%	3%	1%	4%	–	3%	5
30–31 Aug	YouGov/The Times	GB	1,658	41%	42%	6%	4%		4%	2%	0%	1
25–28 Aug	ICM/The Guardian	GB	1,972	42%	42%	7%	2%	0%	3%	3%	0%	Tie
21–22 Aug	YouGov/The Times	GB	1,664	41%	42%	8%	4%		4%	1%	0%	1
15–18 Aug	Opinium/The Observer	GB	2,006	40%	43%	6%	4%	1%	4%	2%	1%	3
7–11 Aug	BMG/The Independent	GB	1,512	42%	39%	7%	2%	0%	6%	3%	0%	3
31 Jul – 1 Aug	YouGov/The Times	GB	1,665	41%	44%	7%	3%		3%	2%	0%	3
20 Jul	Vince Cable is elected leader of the Liberal Democrats											
18–19 Jul	YouGov/The Times	GB	1,593	41%	43%	6%	4%		3%	2%	0%	2
14–18 Jul	Ipsos MORI	GB	1,071	41%	42%	9%	3%	0%	3%	2%	1%	1
14–16 Jul	ICM/The Guardian	GB	2,046	42%	43%	7%	3%	1%	3%	2%	0%	1
14–15 Jul	Survation/The Mail on Sunday	UK	1,024	39%	41%	8%	3%	1%	6%	1%	1%	2
11–14 Jul	BMG	GB	1,518	37%	42%	10%	–	–	4%	–	7%	5
11–14 Jul	Opinium/The Observer	GB	2,013	41%	43%	5%	3%	0%	5%	2%	0%	2
10–11 Jul	YouGov/The Times	GB	1,700	40%	45%	7%	4%		2%	1%	0%	5
5–6 Jul	YouGov/The Times	GB	1,648	38%	46%	6%	4%		4%	1%	1%	8
30 Jun – 3 Jul	ICM/The Guardian	GB	2,044	41%	43%	7%	3%	0%	3%	3%	0%	2
28–30 Jun	Survation	UK	1,017	41%	40%	7%	2%	0%	2%	2%	6% (Note: Including Alliance, Democratic Unionist Party, Social Democratic and Labour Party and Sinn Féin with 1%)	1
27–29 Jun	Opinium/The Observer	GB	2,010	39%	45%	5%	3%	1%	5%	2%	0%	6
16–21 Jun	Panelbase/The Sunday Times	GB	5,481	41%	46%	6%	3%	<1%	2%	1%	<1%	5
16–17 Jun	Survation/Good Morning Britain	UK	1,005	41%	44%	6%	3%	1%	2%	1%	3% (Note: Including the Democratic Unionist Party with 2%)	3
10 Jun	Survation/The Mail on Sunday	UK	1,036	39%	45%	7%	3%	1%	3%	–	2%	6
8 Jun 2017	2017 general election	GB	–	43.4%	41.0%	7.6%	3.1%	0.5%	1.9%	1.7%	0.8%	2.4
8 Jun 2017	2017 general election	UK	–	42.3%	40.0%	7.4%	3.0%	0.5%	1.8%	1.6%	3.3%	2.3

== Seat projections ==
Most polls are reported in terms of the overall popular vote share, and the pollsters do not typically project how these shares would equate to numbers of seats in the House of Commons. Others organisations including Electoral Calculus make rolling projections based on an aggregate of publicly available polls.

A small number of large polls were carried out in order to run multilevel regression with poststratification (MRP) models, which output predictions for each constituency.

Date(s) conducted	Pollster	Client	Area	Sample size	Con	Lab	SNP	LD	PC	Grn	Chg	Brx	Others	Majority
12 Dec 2019	2019 general election		UK	–	365	202	48	11	4	1	0	0	18 DUP: 8 SF: 7 SDLP: 2 All: 1 Speaker: 1	Con 80
4–11 Dec 2019	Electoral Calculus	N/A	UK	23,869	351	224	41	13	2	1	–	0	18 DUP: 10; SF: 6 SDLP: 2 All: 0	Con 52
27 Nov – 10 Dec 2019	FocalData (MRP)	N/A	GB	21,213	337	235	41	14	3	1	–	0	1	Con 24
4–10 Dec 2019	YouGov (MRP)	N/A	GB	105,612	339	231	41	15	4	1	–	0	1	Con 28
4–9 Dec 2019	Electoral Calculus	N/A	UK	16,344	349	226	41	13	2	1	–	0	18 DUP: 10; SF: 6 SDLP: 2 All: 0	Con 48
6–8 Dec 2019	Savanta ComRes	Remain United	UK	17,983	340	233	45	11	2	1	–	0	18 DUP: 10; SF: 6 SDLP: 2 All: 0	Con 30
2–7 Dec 2019	Electoral Calculus	N/A	UK	10,827	348	225	41	13	4	1	–	0	18 DUP: 8 SF: 7 All: 3 SDLP: 0	Con 46
7 Dec 2019	Datapraxis/YouGov	N/A	GB	500,000	344	221	47	14	4	1	–	—N/a	—N/a	Con 38
28 Nov – 4 Dec 2019	Electoral Calculus	N/A	UK	8,410	335	233	44	15	4	1	–	0	18 DUP: 8 SF: 7 All: 3 SDLP: 0	Con 20
26 Nov – 3 Dec 2019	Electoral Calculus	N/A	UK	9,458	339	229	44	15	4	1	–	0	18 DUP: 8 SF: 7 All: 3 SDLP: 0	Con 28
26–30 Nov 2019	Electoral Calculus	N/A	UK	8,914	342	225	45	15	4	1	–	0	18 DUP: 8 SF: 7 All: 3 SDLP: 0	Con 34
21–28 Nov 2019	Electoral Calculus	N/A	UK	8,341	336	231	45	15	4	1	–	0	18 DUP: 8 SF: 7 All: 3 SDLP: 0	Con 22
20–26 Nov 2019	Electoral Calculus	N/A	UK	9,342	331	235	45	16	4	1	–	0	18 DUP: 8 SF: 7 All: 3 SDLP: 0	Con 12
20–26 Nov 2019	YouGov (MRP)	N/A	GB	100,319	359	211	43	13	4	1	–	0	1	Con 68
19–26 Nov 2019	Electoral Calculus	N/A	UK	8,971	342	225	41	19	4	1	–	0	18 DUP: 8 SF: 7 All: 3 SDLP: 0	Con 34
26 Nov 2019	Datapraxis/YouGov	N/A	GB	?	349	216	49	14	5	1	–	0	0	Con 48
19–23 Nov 2019	Electoral Calculus	N/A	UK	9,900	365	202	41	20	3	1	–	0	18 DUP: 8 SF: 7 All: 3 SDLP: 0	Con 80
12–19 Nov 2019	Electoral Calculus	N/A	UK	10,793	361	201	46	19	4	1	–	0	18 DUP: 8 SF: 7 All: 3 SDLP: 0	Con 72
6 Nov 2019	Seat totals at start of campaign period (Note: A significant number of MPs changed parties during the 2017–2019 Parliament.)		UK	–	298	242	35	20	4	1	5	0	45	Hung (Con –28)
1–25 Sep 2019	Focaldata	The Guardian	UK	46,000	364	189	52	23	1	0	–	0	21 DUP: 10; SF: 7 All: 0 SDLP: 0 Others: 4	Con 78
20 Apr 2019 (Note: Date of publication, not fieldwork.)	Electoral Calculus / ComRes (MRP)	The Daily Telegraph	GB	13,600	277	290	47	15	3	0	0	–	0	Hung (Lab –36)
22–23 Feb 2019	Electoral Calculus / YouGov (MRP)	The Times	GB	?	353	134	46	15	4	1	78	–	1	Con 56
2–7 Feb 2019	YouGov (MRP)	N/A	GB	40,119	321	250	39	16	4	1	–	–	1	Hung (Con –5)
8 Jun 2017	2017 general election		UK	–	317	262	35	12	4	1	–	–	18 DUP: 10; SF: 7 SDLP: 0 All: 0 Others: 2	Hung (Con –9)

=== Hypothetical scenarios ===
==== Electoral alliance between the Liberal Democrats and The Independent Group / Change UK ====
On 20 February 2019, Liberal Democrats leader Vince Cable suggested that the Liberal Democrats might not put up candidates against The Independent Group (TIG)—who were subsequently renamed Change UK—in future elections. In March 2019, Business Insider reported that the Lib Dems and TIG discussed forming an electoral alliance.

Date(s) conducted	Pollster	Client	Area	Sample size	Con	Lab	SNP	PC	Grn	LD–Chg	Others	Majority
22–23 Feb 2019	Electoral Calculus / YouGov (MRP)	The Times	GB	?	343	126	45	4	1	113 (Note: Chg: 91 LD: 22)	0	Con 36

== Exit poll ==
An exit poll conducted by Ipsos for the BBC, ITV, and Sky News was published at the end of voting at 22:00, predicting the number of seats for each party.

Parties	Seats	Change
Conservative Party	368	▲51
Labour Party	191	▼71
Scottish National Party	55	▲20
Liberal Democrats	13	▲1
Plaid Cymru	3	▲1
Green Party	1	Steady
Brexit Party	0	New
Others	19	Steady
Conservative majority of 86

== Sub-national poll results ==
=== Scotland ===

Date(s) conducted	Pollster/client(s)	Sample size	SNP	Con	Lab	LD	Grn	UKIP	Chg	Brx	Others	Lead
12 Dec 2019	2019 general election	–	45.0%	25.1%	18.6%	9.5%	1.0%	0.1%	–	0.5%	0.1%	19.9
10–11 Dec 2019	Survation/The Courier	1,012	43%	28%	20%	7%	1%	–	–	1%	–	15
4–10 Dec 2019	YouGov (MRP)	(Note: This was a UK-wide poll, and the number of participants in Scotland was not recorded.)	41%	27%	20%	10%	1%	–	–	1%	–	14
3–6 Dec 2019	Panelbase/Sunday Times	1,020	39%	29%	21%	10%	1%	–	–	0%	0%	10
29 Nov – 3 Dec 2019	YouGov/The Times	1,002	44%	28%	15%	12%	1%	–	–	0%	0%	16
19–25 Nov 2019	Ipsos MORI/STV	1,046	44%	26%	16%	11%	2%	–	–	<1%	–	18
20–22 Nov 2019	Panelbase/Sunday Times	1,009	40%	28%	20%	11%	<1%	–	–	<1%	<1%	12
6 Nov 2019	Parliament dissolved and official campaign period begins											
23–25 Oct 2019	YouGov	1,060	42%	22%	12%	13%	4%	0%	0%	6%	0%	20
9–11 Oct 2019	Panelbase/The Sunday Times	1,003	39%	21%	19%	13%	2%	–	–	5%	–	18
30 Aug – 3 Sep 2019	YouGov/The Times	1,059	43%	20%	15%	12%	4%	0%	0%	6%	0%	23
29 Aug 2019	Ruth Davidson resigns as leader of the Scottish Conservative Party											
18–20 Jun 2019	Panelbase/The Sunday Times	1,024	38%	18%	17%	13%	2%	<1%	<1%	9%	–	20
14–17 May 2019	Panelbase/The Sunday Times	1,021	38%	18%	19%	10%	3%	1%	2%	9%	<1%	19
24–26 Apr 2019	YouGov/The Times	1,029	43%	20%	17%	9%	3%	1%	2%	4%	0%	23
18–24 Apr 2019	Panelbase/The Sunday Times	1,018	38%	22%	21%	6%	2%	2%	3%	5%	<1%	16
18–23 Apr 2019	Survation/Scotland in Union	1,012	41%	22%	24%	8%	–	–	–	–	5%	17
28 Feb – 6 Mar 2019	Panelbase/Wings Over Scotland	1,002	37%	27%	22%	7%	2%	2%	2%	–	<1%	10
1–4 Mar 2019	Survation/Scottish Daily Mail	1,011	40%	24%	23%	8%	–	–	–	–	4%	16
30 Nov – 5 Dec 2018	Panelbase/The Sunday Times	1,028	37%	26%	26%	6%	2%	2%	–	–	<1%	11
9–13 Nov 2018	Survation/Scotland in Union	1,013	39%	26%	24%	8%	–	–	–	–	3%	13
2–7 Nov 2018	Panelbase/Constitutional Commission	1,050	37%	28%	25%	7%	2%	2%	–	–	3%	9
20 Oct – 2 Nov 2018	Survation/Channel 4	1,734	40%	27%	23%	7%	1%	1%	–	–	1%	13
18–21 Oct 2018	Survation/Daily Record	1,017	36%	27%	26%	7%	1%	–	–	–	1%	9
3–5 Oct 2018	Survation/SNP	1,013	37%	28%	26%	6%	–	–	–	–	2%	9
28 Sep – 4 Oct 2018	Panelbase/The Sunday Times	1,024	38%	27%	24%	6%	2%	2%	–	–	<1%	11
28 Sep – 2 Oct 2018	Survation/The Sunday Post	1,036	41%	26%	24%	7%	–	–	–	–	3%	15
5–10 Jul 2018	Survation/Daily Record	1,004	42%	24%	23%	8%	–	–	–	–	3%	18
21–26 Jun 2018	Panelbase/Wings Over Scotland	1,018	38%	27%	25%	7%	2%	<1%	–	–	<1%	11
8–13 Jun 2018	Panelbase/The Sunday Times	1,021	38%	27%	27%	6%	2%	<1%	–	–	<1%	11
1–5 Jun 2018	YouGov/The Times	1,075	40%	27%	23%	7%	2%	1%	–	–	1%	13
23–28 Mar 2018	Panelbase/The Sunday Times	1,037	36%	28%	27%	6%	2%	1%	–	–	<1%	8
5–11 Mar 2018	Ipsos MORI/STV	1,050	39%	25%	26%	6%	4%	0%	–	–	0%	13
24–28 Jan 2018	Survation/Daily Record	1,029	39%	24%	27%	7%	–	–	–	–	3%	12
12–16 Jan 2018	YouGov/The Times	1,002	36%	23%	28%	6%	3%	3%	–	–	0%	8
1–5 Dec 2017	Survation/The Sunday Post	1,006	38%	24%	29%	7%	–	–	–	–	3%	9
27–30 Nov 2017	Survation/Daily Record	1,017	37%	25%	28%	7%	–	–	–	–	3%	9
18 Nov 2017	Richard Leonard is elected leader of the Scottish Labour Party											
2–5 Oct 2017	YouGov/The Times	1,135	40%	23%	30%	5%	1%	1%	–	–	0%	10
8–12 Sep 2017	Survation/Scottish Daily Mail	1,016	39%	26%	26%	7%	–	–	–	–	2%	13
31 Aug – 7 Sep 2017	Panelbase/The Sunday Times	1,021	41%	27%	24%	6%	2%	–	–	–	–	14
8 Jun 2017	2017 general election	–	36.9%	28.6%	27.1%	6.8%	0.2%	0.2%	–	–	0.3%	8.3

=== Wales ===

Date(s) conducted	Pollster/client(s)	Sample size	Lab	Con	PC	LD	UKIP	Grn	Chg	Brx	Others	Lead
12 Dec 2019	2019 general election	–	40.9%	36.1%	9.9%	6.0%	-	1.0%	–	5.4%	0.7%	4.8
4-10 Dec 2019	YouGov (MRP)	(Note: This was a UK-wide poll, and the number of participants in Wales was not recorded.)	43%	34%	10%	5%	–	1%	–	6%	1%	9
6–9 Dec 2019	YouGov/ITV Cymru Wales/Cardiff University	1,020	40%	37%	10%	6%	–	1%	–	5%	1%	3
22–25 Nov 2019	YouGov/ITV Cymru Wales/Cardiff University	1,116	38%	32%	11%	9%	–	1%	–	8%	1%	6
31 Oct–4 Nov 2019	YouGov/ITV Cymru Wales/Cardiff University	1,136	29%	28%	12%	12%	0%	3%	0%	15%	1%	1
10–14 Oct 2019	YouGov/ITV Cymru Wales/Cardiff University	1,071	25%	29%	12%	16%	0%	4%	0%	14%	1%	4
1 Aug 2019	Brecon and Radnorshire by-election											
23–28 July 2019	YouGov/ITV Cymru Wales/Cardiff University	1,071	22%	24%	15%	16%	–	3%	–	18%	1%	2
16–20 May 2019	YouGov/ITV Cymru Wales/Cardiff University	1,009	25%	17%	13%	12%	1%	5%	2%	23%	2%	2
2–5 Apr 2019	YouGov/ITV Cymru Wales/Cardiff University	1,025	33%	26%	15%	7%	3%	2%	9%	4%	1%	7
4 Apr 2019	Newport West by-election											
7–23 Feb 2019	ICM/BBC Wales	1,000	42%	33%	13%	6%	3%	1%	–	–	2%	9
19–22 Feb 2019	YouGov/ITV Cymru Wales/Cardiff University	1,025	35%	29%	14%	8%	6%	3%	–	–	4%	6
7–14 Dec 2018	Sky Data/Cardiff University	1,014	45%	32%	14%	3%	4%	2%	–	–	1%	13
6–13 Dec 2018	Mark Drakeford is elected leader of Welsh Labour and becomes First Minister											
4–7 Dec 2018	YouGov/ITV Cymru Wales/Cardiff University	1,024	43%	31%	13%	6%	3%	3%	–	–	1%	12
30 Oct–2 Nov 2018	YouGov/ITV Cymru Wales/Cardiff University	1,031	42%	33%	10%	7%	4%	2%	–	–	1%	9
20 Oct–2 Nov 2018	Survation/Channel 4	1,177	47%	30%	13%	6%	3%	2%	–	–	0%	17
28 Sep 2018	Adam Price is elected leader of Plaid Cymru											
6 Sep 2018	Paul Davies is elected leader of the Welsh Conservatives											
28 Jun–2 Jul 2018	YouGov/ITV Cymru Wales/Cardiff University	1,031	44%	31%	13%	5%	3%	2%	–	–	1%	13
12–15 Mar 2018	YouGov/ITV Cymru Wales/Cardiff University	1,015	46%	33%	11%	4%	4%	2%	–	–	1%	13
8–25 Feb 2018	ICM/BBC Wales	1,001	49%	32%	11%	5%	2%	1%	–	–	0%	17
21–24 Nov 2017	YouGov/ITV Cymru Wales/Cardiff University	1,016	47%	31%	11%	5%	3%	2%	–	–	1%	16
3 Nov 2017	Jane Dodds is elected leader of the Welsh Liberal Democrats											
4–7 Sep 2017	YouGov/ITV Cymru Wales/Cardiff University	1,011	50%	32%	8%	4%	3%	1%	–	–	1%	18
8 Jun 2017	2017 general election	–	48.9%	33.6%	10.4%	4.5%	2.0%	0.3%	–	–	0.2%	15.4

=== Northern Ireland ===
Date(s) conducted	Pollster/client(s)	Sample size	DUP	SF	SDLP	UUP	All	GPNI	Others	Lead
12 Dec 2019	2019 general election	–	30.6%	22.8%	14.9%	11.7%	16.8%	0.2%	3.1%	7.8
27–30 Nov 2019	Lucid Talk/Remain United	2,422	30%	25%	13%	11%	16%	0%	5%	5
9 Nov 2019	Steve Aiken is elected leader of the Ulster Unionist Party									
30 Oct – 1 Nov 2019	Lucid Talk/Remain United	2,386	28%	24%	14%	9%	16%	1%	8% (Note: Including 1% for Traditional Unionist Voice, 1% for People Before Profit and 3% for Sylvia Hermon.)	4
9–12 Aug 2019	Lucid Talk	2,302	29%	25%	8%	9%	21%	1%	7%	4
21 Nov 2018	Clare Bailey becomes leader of Green Party NI									
20 Oct – 2 Nov 2018	Survation/Channel 4	555	31%	27%	11%	15%	12%	–	4%	4
3 May 2018	West Tyrone by-election									
10 Feb 2018	Mary Lou McDonald becomes leader of Sinn Féin									
8 Jun 2017	2017 general election	–	36.0%	29.4%	11.7%	10.3%	7.9%	0.9%	3.7%	6.6

=== London ===
Date(s) conducted	Pollster/client(s)	Sample size	Lab	Con	LD	Grn	UKIP	Chg	Brx	Others	Lead
12 Dec 2019	2019 general election	–	48.1%	32.0%	14.9%	3.1%	–	–	1.4%	0.5%	16.1
4–10 Dec 2019	YouGov (MRP)	(Note: This was a UK-wide poll, and the number of participants in London was not recorded.)	47%	31%	15%	3%	–	–	2%	1%	16
28 Nov – 2 Dec 2019	YouGov/Queen Mary University of London	1,019	47%	30%	15%	4%	–	–	3%	1%	17
30 Oct – 4 Nov 2019	YouGov/Queen Mary University of London	1,175	39%	29%	19%	5%	0%	—	6%	—	10
7–10 May 2019	YouGov/Queen Mary University of London	1,015	35%	23%	21%	7%	0%	2%	10%	1%	12
3–6 Dec 2018	YouGov/Queen Mary University of London	1,020	49%	33%	11%	3%	3%	–	–	1%	16
3–7 Sep 2018	YouGov/Queen Mary University of London	1,218	48%	26%	15%	5%	4%	–	–	2%	22
14 Jun 2018	Lewisham East by-election										
3 May 2018	2018 London local elections										
20–24 Apr 2018	YouGov/Queen Mary University of London	1,099	52%	31%	10%	3%	2%	–	–	1%	21
12–15 Feb 2018	YouGov/Queen Mary University of London	1,155	53%	33%	8%	3%	2%	–	–	0%	20
25–29 Sep 2017	YouGov/Queen Mary University of London	1,044	55%	30%	8%	2%	3%	–	–	1%	25
8 Jun 2017	2017 general election	–	54.5%	33.1%	8.8%	1.8%	1.3%	–	–	0.5%	21.4

=== North East England ===
Date(s) conducted	Pollster/client(s)	Sample size	Lab	Con	LD	UKIP	Grn	Brx	Others	Lead
12 Dec 2019	2019 general election	–	42.6%	38.3%	6.9%	0.1%	2.3%	7.9%	1.7%	4.3
4–10 Dec 2019	YouGov (MRP)	(Note: This was a UK-wide poll, and the number of participants in North West England was not recorded.)	44%	35%	7%	–	2%	10%	1%	9
21–22 Nov 2019	Survation/Daily Mail	248	42%	30%	11%	–	4%	13%	–	12
17–28 Oct 2019	YouGov	523	32%	26%	15%	1%	7%	19%	1%	6
8 Jun 2017	2017 general election	–	55.6%	34.5%	4.6%	3.9%	1.3%	–	0.2%	21.1

=== North West England ===
Date(s) conducted	Pollster/client(s)	Sample size	Lab	Con	LD	UKIP	Grn	Brx	Others	Lead
12 Dec 2019	2019 general election	–	46.4%	37.6%	7.9%	0.0%	2.4%	3.8%	1.7%	8.8
4–10 Dec 2019	YouGov (MRP)	(Note: This was a UK-wide poll, and the number of participants in North West London was not recorded.)	44%	36%	8%	–	3%	6%	2%	8
21–22 Nov 2019	Survation/Daily Mail	681	39%	37%	11%	–	3%	8%	1%	2
17–28 Oct 2019	YouGov	1,269	30%	33%	17%	1%	5%	14%	0%	3
8 Jun 2017	2017 general election	–	55.0%	36.3%	5.4%	1.9%	1.1%	–	0.3%	18.7

=== Yorkshire and the Humber ===
Date(s) conducted	Pollster/client(s)	Sample size	Lab	Con	LD	UKIP	Grn	Brx	Others	Lead
12 Dec 2019	2019 general election	–	38.8%	43.0%	8.0%	0.0%	2.2%	5.9%	1.7%	4.8
4–10 Dec 2019	YouGov (MRP)	(Note: This was a UK-wide poll, and the number of participants in Yorkshire and the Humber was not recorded.)	40%	40%	8%	–	2%	7%	2%	Tie
21–22 Nov 2019	Survation/Daily Mail	434	39%	38%	13%	–	3%	7%	1%	1
17–28 Oct 2019	YouGov	1,036	29%	34%	16%	0%	7%	14%	1%	5
8 Jun 2017	2017 general election	–	49.1%	40.6%	5.0%	2.6%	1.3%	–	1.4%	8.5

=== East Midlands ===
Date(s) conducted	Pollster/client(s)	Sample size	Con	Lab	LD	UKIP	Grn	Brx	Others	Lead
12 Dec 2019	2019 general election	–	54.9%	31.8%	7.8%	0.0%	2.5%	1.5%	1.6%	23.1
4–10 Dec 2019	YouGov (MRP)	(Note: This was a UK-wide poll, and the number of participants in the East Midlands was not recorded.)	51%	34%	8%	–	2%	2%	2%	17
21–22 Nov 2019	Survation/Daily Mail	464	49%	31%	13%	–	3%	3%	1%	18
17–28 Oct 2019	YouGov	896	45%	22%	15%	0%	6%	12%	1%	23
8 Jun 2017	2017 general election	–	50.8%	40.5%	4.3%	2.4%	1.5%	–	0.6%	10.3

=== West Midlands ===
Date(s) conducted	Pollster/client(s)	Sample size	Con	Lab	LD	UKIP	Grn	Brx	Others	Lead
12 Dec 2019	2019 general election	–	53.5%	33.9%	7.9%	0.0%	2.9%	1.3%	0.4%	19.6
4–10 Dec 2019	YouGov (MRP)	(Note: This was a UK-wide poll, and the number of participants in the West Midlands was not recorded.)	49%	36%	9%	–	3%	2%	1%	13
21–22 Nov 2019	Survation/Daily Mail	507	41%	34%	15%	–	4%	5%	2%	7
17–28 Oct 2019	YouGov	1,017	43%	23%	14%	0%	7%	12%	1%	20
8 Jun 2017	2017 general election	–	49.1%	42.6%	4.4%	1.8%	1.6%	–	0.5%	6.5

=== East of England ===
Date(s) conducted	Pollster/client(s)	Sample size	Con	Lab	LD	UKIP	Grn	Brx	Others	Lead
12 Dec 2019	2019 general election	–	57.2%	24.5%	13.4%	0.0%	2.9%	0.4%	1.6%	32.7
4–10 Dec 2019	YouGov (MRP)	(Note: This was a UK-wide poll, and the number of participants in the East of England was not recorded.)	54%	27%	14%	–	3%	1%	2%	27
17–28 Oct 2019	YouGov	1,107	45%	17%	18%	0%	5%	14%	0%	27
8 Jun 2017	2017 general election	–	54.7%	32.8%	7.9%	2.5%	1.5%	–	0.2%	21.9

=== South East England ===
Date(s) conducted	Pollster/client(s)	Sample size	Con	Lab	LD	Grn	UKIP	Brx	Others	Lead
12 Dec 2019	2019 general election	–	54.2%	22.1%	18.3%	3.9%	0.1%	0.2%	1.2%	32.1
4–10 Dec 2019	YouGov (MRP)	(Note: This was a UK-wide poll, and the number of participants in South East England was not recorded.)	51%	24%	19%	4%	–	–	2%	27
17–28 Oct 2019	YouGov	1,592	41%	16%	23%	6%	0%	12%	0%	18
8 Jun 2017	2017 general election	–	54.8%	28.6%	10.6%	3.1%	2.2%	–	0.8%	26.2

=== South West England ===
Date(s) conducted	Pollster/client(s)	Sample size	Con	Lab	LD	Grn	UKIP	Brx	Others	Lead
12 Dec 2019	2019 general election	–	52.9%	23.3%	18.1%	3.7%	0.0%	0.3%	1.5%	29.6
4–10 Dec 2019	YouGov (MRP)	(Note: This was a UK-wide poll, and the number of participants in South West England was not recorded.)	50%	25%	19%	3%	–	–	2%	25
17–28 Oct 2019	YouGov	1,172	41%	17%	21%	7%	0%	13%	1%	20
8 Jun 2017	2017 general election	–	51.5%	29.1%	14.9%	2.2%	1.1%	–	1.1%	22.4

=== Other polling ===
==== Marginal constituencies ====
Number Cruncher Politics polled adults living in the 60 English marginal constituencies with a Labour or Conservative majority of less than 5 per cent at the 2017 election.

Date(s) conducted	Pollster/client(s)	Sample size	Con	Lab	LD	Grn	UKIP	Others	Lead
1–19 Sep 2018	Number Cruncher Politics/Shelter	1,247	40%	42%	10%	2%	5%	2%	2
8 Jun 2017	2017 general election	–	46%	44%	7%	1%	2%	–	2

== Individual constituency polling ==
Note that where the client is a political party, constituency level polling may be particularly susceptible to publication bias.

=== East Midlands ===
==== Gedling ====
Date(s) conducted	Pollster/client(s)	Sample size	Lab	Con	LD	Grn	Brx	Lead
12 Dec 2019	2019 general election	–	44.1%	45.5%	4.6%	2.2%	3.6%	1.4
4 Nov 2019	Survation/The Economist	409	42%	37%	6%	1%	13%	5
8 Jun 2017	2017 general election	–	51.9%	42.8%	2.0%	3.2%	–	9.1

=== East of England ===
==== Cambridge ====
Date(s) conducted	Pollster/client(s)	Sample size	Lab	LD	Con	Grn	Brx	Others	Lead
12 Dec 2019	2019 general election	–	48.0%	30.0%	15.5%	4.0%	1.9%	0.5%	17.9
16–17 Oct 2019	Survation/Liberal Democrats	417	30%	39%	10%	12%	7%	1%	9
8 Jun 2017	2017 general election	–	51.9%	29.3%	16.3%	2.2%	N/A	0.2%	22.6

==== South Cambridgeshire ====
Date(s) conducted	Pollster/client(s)	Sample size	Con	Lab	LD	Green	Brx	Others	Lead
12 Dec 2019	2019 general election	–	46.3%	11.7%	42.0%	—	—	—	4.3
4–5 Nov 2019	Survation/Liberal Democrats	410	36%	12%	40%	4%	7%	0%	4
8 Jun 2017	2017 general election	–	51.8%	27.2%	18.6%	2.3%	—	—	24.6

==== South East Cambridgeshire ====
Date(s) conducted	Pollster/client(s)	Sample size	Con	Lab	LD	Brx	Others	Lead
12 Dec 2019	2019 general election	–	50.0%	16.3%	32.1%	—	1.6%	17.9
25–28 Oct 2019	Survation/Liberal Democrats	408	42%	16%	31%	8%	4%	11
8 Jun 2017	2017 general election	–	53.3%	27.7%	19.0%	–	—	25.6

==== South West Hertfordshire ====
Date(s) conducted	Pollster/client(s)	Sample size	Con	Lab	LD	Grn	Gauke (Ind)	Others	Lead
12 Dec 2019	2019 general election	–	49.6%	11.8%	10.2%	2.4%	26.0%	—	23.5
22–26 Nov 2019	Deltapoll/Peter Kellner	405	50%	17%	13%	2%	16%	2%	33
8 Jun 2017	2017 general election	–	57.9%	25.7%	11.7%	2.6%	—N/a	2.1	32.2

=== London ===
==== Carshalton and Wallington ====
Date(s) conducted	Pollster/client(s)	Sample size	LD	Con	Lab	Brx	Grn	Others	Lead
12 Dec 2019	2019 general election	–	41.1%	42.4%	12.4%	2.1%	1.5%	0.4%	1.3
4–22 Nov 2019	Datapraxis/YouGov	?	42.8%	41.2%	9%	2.6%	4.4%	–	1.6
8 Jun 2017	2017 general election	–	41%	38.3%	18.4%	–	1.3%	–	2.7

==== Chelsea and Fulham ====
Date(s) conducted	Pollster/client(s)	Sample size	Con	Lab	LD	AWP	Others	Lead
12 Dec 2019	2019 general election	–	49.9%	23.2%	25.9%	1.1%	–	24.0
14–21 Nov 2019	Deltapoll/Peter Kellner	502	48%	24%	25%	–	3%	23
4–22 Nov 2019	Datapraxis/YouGov	?	41.6%	21.4%	34.4%	–	0%	7.2
8 Jun 2017	2017 general election	–	52.6%	33.2%	11.0%	–	3.1%	19.4

==== Chingford and Woodford Green ====
Date(s) conducted	Pollster/client(s)	Sample size	Con	Lab	LD	Others	Lead
12 Dec 2019	2019 general election	–	48.5%	45.9%	5.7%	—	2.6
4 Nov–5 Dec 2019	Datapraxis/YouGov	700–800	46%	44.4%	9.6%	0%	1.6
4–22 Nov 2019	Datapraxis/YouGov	350–400	46.6%	42.4%	11%	–	4.2
8 Jun 2017	2017 general election	–	49.1%	43.9%	4.4%	2.6%	5.2

==== Cities of London and Westminster ====
Date(s) conducted	Pollster/client(s)	Sample size	Con	Lab	LD	Grn	Others	Lead
12 Dec 2019	2019 general election	–	39.9%	27.2%	30.7%	1.7%	0.5%	9.3
3–8 Dec 2019	Deltapoll/Datapraxis	502	44%	26%	28%	1%	1%	16
14–21 Nov 2019	Deltapoll/Peter Kellner	500	39%	26%	33%	1%	1%	6
4–22 Nov 2019	YouGov/Datapraxis	?	38.8%	25.7%	29.9%	4%	1.5%	8.9
8 Jun 2017	2017 general election	–	46.6%	38.4%	11.1%	2.1%	1.8%	8.1

==== Finchley and Golders Green ====
Date(s) conducted	Pollster/client(s)	Sample size	Con	Lab	LD	Grn	Brx	Others	Lead
12 Dec 2019	2019 general election	–	43.8%	24.2%	31.9%	–	–	–	11.9
3–6 Dec 2019	Deltapoll/Datapraxis/	500	46%	19%	34%	0%	–	1%	12
Nov 2019	Watermelon/The Jewish Chronicle	507	37%	18%	31%	–	–	13%	6
7–12 Nov 2019	Deltapoll/Peter Kellner	500	46%	19%	32%	0%	–	3%	14
4–22 Nov 2019	YouGov/Datapraxis	?	42.4%	25.1%	32.5%	–	–	0%	9.9
2 Oct 2019	Survation/Liberal Democrats	400	29%	25%	41%	3%	2%	0%	12
8 Jun 2017	2017 general election	–	47.0%	43.8%	6.6%	1.8%	–	–	3.2

==== Hendon ====
Date(s) conducted	Pollster/client(s)	Sample size	Con	Lab	LD	Grn	Others	Lead
12 Dec 2019	2019 general election	–	48.8%	41.1%	8.4%	1.7%	–	7.7
14–21 Nov 2019	Deltapoll/Peter Kellner	501	51%	33%	12%	1%	3%	14
4–22 Nov 2019	Datapraxis/YouGov	350–400	46.6%	32.3%	18%	3%	–	14.3
8 Jun 2017	2017 general election	–	48.0%	46.0%	3.8%	1.1%	1.1%	2.0

==== Kensington ====
Date(s) conducted	Pollster/client(s)	Sample size	Lab	Con	LD	Grn	Brx	Others	Lead
12 Dec 2019	2019 general election	–	38.0%	38.3%	21.3%	1.2%	0.9%	0.4%	0.3
4–8 Dec 2019	Deltapoll/Datapraxis	502	29%	39%	26%	–	–	4%	10
7–13 Nov 2019	Deltapoll/Peter Kellner	501	27%	36%	33%	–	–	3%	3
4–22 Nov 2019	YouGov/Datapraxis	?	30.1%	34.4%	27.7%	–	–	7.7%	4.3
8 Jun 2017	2017 general election	–	42.2%	42.2%	12.2%	2.0%	–	3.4%	0.05

==== Putney ====
Date(s) conducted	Pollster/client(s)	Sample size	Con	Lab	LD	Grn	Others	Lead
12 Dec 2019	2019 general election	–	35.7%	45.1%	16.9%	2.2%	N/A	9.4
26 Nov – 1 Dec 2019	Deltapoll/Peter Kellner	501	38%	35%	24%	2%	1%	3
4 Nov – 5 Dec 2019	Datapraxis/YouGov	700–800	37.9%	34.7%	23.5%	3.8%	0%	3.2
4–22 Nov 2019	Datapraxis/YouGov	350–400	37.7%	29.3%	28.4%	4.6%	–	8.4
8 Jun 2017	2017 general election	–	44.1%	40.8%	11.6%	2.4%	1.1%	3.3

==== Richmond Park ====
Date(s) conducted	Pollster/client(s)	Sample size	Con	LD	Lab	Others	Lead
12 Dec 2019	2019 general election	–	41.2%	53.1%	5.2%	0.5%	11.9
4–22 Nov 2019	Datapraxis/YouGov	?	35.6%	56%	6.4%	2.1%	20.4
8 Jun 2017	2017 general election	–	45.1%	45.1%	9.1%	0.7%	0.01

==== Wimbledon ====
Date(s) conducted	Pollster/client(s)	Sample size	Con	LD	LD	Others	Lead
12 Dec 2019	2019 general election	–	38.4%	23.7%	37.2%	0.7%	1.2
7–13 Nov 2019	Deltapoll/Peter Kellner	500	38%	23%	36%	3%	2
4–22 Nov 2019	Datapraxis/YouGov	?	37.4%	24.7%	34.7%	3.3%	2.7
8 Jun 2017	2017 general election	–	46.5%	35.6%	14.5%	3.5%	11.5

=== North East England ===
==== Berwick-upon-Tweed ====
Date(s) conducted	Pollster/client(s)	Sample size	Con	Lab	LD	Grn	Lead
12 Dec 2019	2019 general election	–	56.9%	21.6%	18.2%	3.3%	35.3
22–26 Nov 2019	Deltapoll/Peter Kellner	500	60%	17%	21%	2%	39
8 Jun 2017	2017 general election	–	52.5%	24.6%	21.1%	1.9%	27.9

==== Stockton South ====
Date(s) conducted	Pollster/client(s)	Sample size	Lab	Con	UKIP	LD	Grn	Brx	Others	Lead
12 Dec 2019	2019 general election	–	41.1%	50.7%	–	4.3%	–	4.0%	–	9.6
9 Dec 2019	Survation	?	43%	46%	–	3%	–	7%	–	3.0
8 Jun 2017	2017 general election	–	48.5%	46.8%	2.2%	1.8%	0.7%	–	–	1.6

=== North West England ===
==== Southport ====
Date(s) conducted	Pollster/client(s)	Sample size	Con	Lab	LD	Others	Lead
12 Dec 2019	2019 general election	–	47.6%	39.0%	13.5%	–	8.6
2–6 Dec 2019	Deltapoll/Peter Kellner	500	43%	35%	22%	–	7
8 Jun 2017	2017 general election	–	38.7%	32.6%	26.4%	2.4%	6.1

==== Workington ====
Date(s) conducted	Pollster/client(s)	Sample size	Lab	Con	LD	Grn	Brx	Others	Lead
12 Dec 2019	2019 general election	–	39.2%	49.3%	3.7%	1.4%	4.2%	2.2%	10.1
30–31 Oct 2019	Survation	506	34%	45%	5%	2%	13%	2%	11
8 Jun 2017	2017 general election	–	51.1%	41.7%	2.7%	–	–	4.4%	9.4

=== South East England ===
==== Beaconsfield ====
Date(s) conducted	Pollster/client(s)	Sample size	Con	Lab	LD	Grieve (Ind)	Grn	Others	Lead
12 Dec 2019	2019 general election	–	56.1%	9.9%	–	29.0%	3.5%	1.4%	27.1
21–26 Nov 2019	Deltapoll/Peter Kellner	500	53%	7%	–	35%	–	5%	18
8 Jun 2017	2017 general election	–	65.3%	21.4%	7.9%	–	2.5%	2.9%	43.9

==== Esher and Walton ====
Date(s) conducted	Pollster/client(s)	Sample size	Con	Lab	LD	Grn	Brx	Others	Lead
12 Dec 2019	2019 general election	–	49.4%	4.5%	45.0%	–	–	1.3%	4.3
21–26 Nov 2019	Deltapoll/Peter Kellner	396	46%	9%	41%	–	–	4%	5
30 Oct – 4 Nov 2019	Survation/Liberal Democrats	406	45%	11%	36%	3%	4%	1%	9
8 Jun 2017	2017 general election	–	58.6%	19.7%	17.3%	1.8%	–	2.5%	38.9

==== Guildford ====
Date(s) conducted	Pollster/client(s)	Sample size	Con	Milton (Ind) (Note: Milton was the Conservative candidate in the 2017 election.)	LD	Lab	Others	Lead
12 Dec 2019	2019 general election	–	44.9%	7.4%	39.2%	7.7%	0.8%	5.7
21–26 Nov 2019	Deltapoll/Peter Kellner	500	40%	7%	41%	11%	1%	1
8 Jun 2017	2017 general election	–	54.6%		23.9%	19.0%	2.6%	30.7

==== Portsmouth South ====
Date(s) conducted	Pollster/client(s)	Sample size	Lab	Con	LD	Brx	Others	Lead
12 Dec 2019	2019 general election	–	48.6%	37.3%	11.4%	2.1%	0.5%	11.3
22–27 Nov 2019	Deltapoll	500	46%	38%	11%	2%	2%	8
28–29 Oct 2019	Survation/Liberal Democrats	406	24%	27%	30%	14%	6%	3
8 Jun 2017	2017 general election	–	41.0%	37.6%	17.3%	–	4.1%	3.5

==== Reading West ====
Date(s) conducted	Pollster/client(s)	Sample size	Con	Lab	LD	Grn	Brx	Others	Lead
12 Dec 2019	2019 general election	–	48.2%	40.1%	8.9%	2.5%	–	–	8.1
7–8 Nov 2019	Survation	410	50%	26%	13%	3%	7%	0%	24
8 Jun 2017	2017 general election	–	48.9%	43.3%	5.9%	1.9%	–	–	5.6

==== Wokingham ====
Date(s) conducted	Pollster/client(s)	Sample size	Con	Lab	LD	Grn	Brx	Others	Lead
8 Jun 2017	2017 general election	–	49.6%	10.4%	37.7%	2.2%	—	0.1%	11.9
31 Oct—4 Nov 2019	Survation/Liberal Democrats	406	42%	12%	38%	3%	5%	—	4
8 Jun 2017	2017 general election	–	56.6%	25.1%	15.9%	2.3%	—	—	24.6

=== South West England ===
==== Bath ====
Date(s) conducted	Pollster/client(s)	Sample size	LD	Con	Lab	Brx	Others	Lead
12 Dec 2019	2019 general election	–	54.5%	30.9%	12.7%	1.2%	0.7%	23.5
7–14 Sep 2017	Survation/Bath Labour	555	46%	32%	17%	5%	–	14
8 Jun 2017	2017 general election	–	47.3%	35.8%	14.7%	–	–	11.5

==== North East Somerset ====
Date(s) conducted	Pollster/client(s)	Sample size	Con	Lab	LD	Grn	Brx	Others	Lead
12 Dec 2019	2019 general election	–	50.4%	24.2%	22.1%	2.5%	–	0.8%	26.1
16–17 Oct 2019	Survation/Liberal Democrats	405	44%	14%	28%	3%	7%	4%	16
8 Jun 2017	2017 general election	–	53.6%	34.7%	8.3%	2.3%	–	1.1%	18.9

=== Wales ===
==== Wrexham ====
Date(s) conducted	Pollster/client(s)	Sample size	Lab	Con	LD	PC	Brx	Grn	Lead
12 Dec 2019	2019 general election	–	39.0%	45.3%	4.3%	6.4%	3.6%	1.3%	6.3
27–30 Nov 2019	Survation/The Economist	405	29%	44%	5%	10%	9%	–	15
8 Jun 2017	2017 general election	–	48.9%	43.7%	2.5%	5.0%	–	–	5.2

=== West Midlands ===
==== Warwick and Leamington ====
Date(s) conducted	Pollster/client(s)	Sample size	Lab	Con	LD	Grn	Brx	Others	Lead
12 Dec 2019	2019 general election	–	43.8%	42.3%	9.2%	2.8%	1.5%	0.4% (Note: Independent with 0.3%; SDP with 0.1%)	1.5
21–23 Nov 2019	Survation/The Economist	413	39%	40%	10%	–	6%	4%	1
8 Jun 2017	2017 general election	–	46.7%	44.4%	5.2%	2.2%	–	1.7% (Note: UKIP with 1.5%; rejected ballots with 0.2%)	2.3

=== Yorkshire and the Humber ===
==== Great Grimsby ====
Date(s) conducted	Pollster/client(s)	Sample size	Lab	Con	LD	Grn	Brx	Others	Lead
12 Dec 2019	2019 general election	–	32.7%	54.9%	3.2%	1.6%	7.2%	0.5%	22.2
14–15 Nov 2019	Survation/The Economist	401	31%	44%	4%	3%	17%	1%	13
8 Jun 2017	2017 general election	–	49.4%	42.2%	2.7%	–	–	5.7%	7.2

== See also ==
- Leadership approval opinion polling for the 2019 United Kingdom general election
- Opinion polling for the 2024 United Kingdom general election
- Opinion polling for the 2021 Scottish Parliament election
- Opinion polling for the 2021 Senedd election
- Opinion polling for the 2022 Northern Ireland Assembly election
- Opinion polling on the United Kingdom's membership of the European Union (2016–2020)
- Opinion polling for the 2019 European Parliament election in the United Kingdom
- List of United Kingdom by-elections (2010–present)
