= 2021 Ulster Unionist Party leadership election =

- 27 May 2021
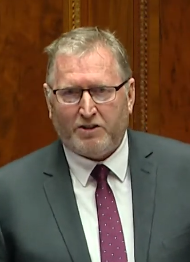
Candidate	Doug Beattie
Popular vote	Unopposed
Percentage	100%
Leader before election
Steve Aiken
Elected Leader
Doug Beattie

An election for the leadership of the Ulster Unionist Party (UUP) was held on 27 May 2021 at a meeting of the Ulster Unionist Party council. The election was triggered following the resignation of incumbent leader Steve Aiken, who was elected in 2019. Doug Beattie, a retired Army captain who was first elected as an MLA in 2016, was elected leader of the party unopposed.

Doug Beattie, MLA for Upper Bann, was announced as the only candidate nominated for leader on 17 May 2021. He was ratified as leader of the party by a virtual meeting of party members on 27 May 2021.

Beattie had established a reputation at Stormont as one of the UUP's most liberal voices on a variety of social issues, including abortion and LGBT rights. Beattie's election as leader was noted as a shift to the centre ground for the UUP.

The Ulster Unionist leadership election came just days after Northern Ireland's largest unionist party, the Democratic Unionist Party (DUP), elected Edwin Poots and Paula Bradley as their new leader and deputy leader respectively.
