= Peter Kellner =

English journalist

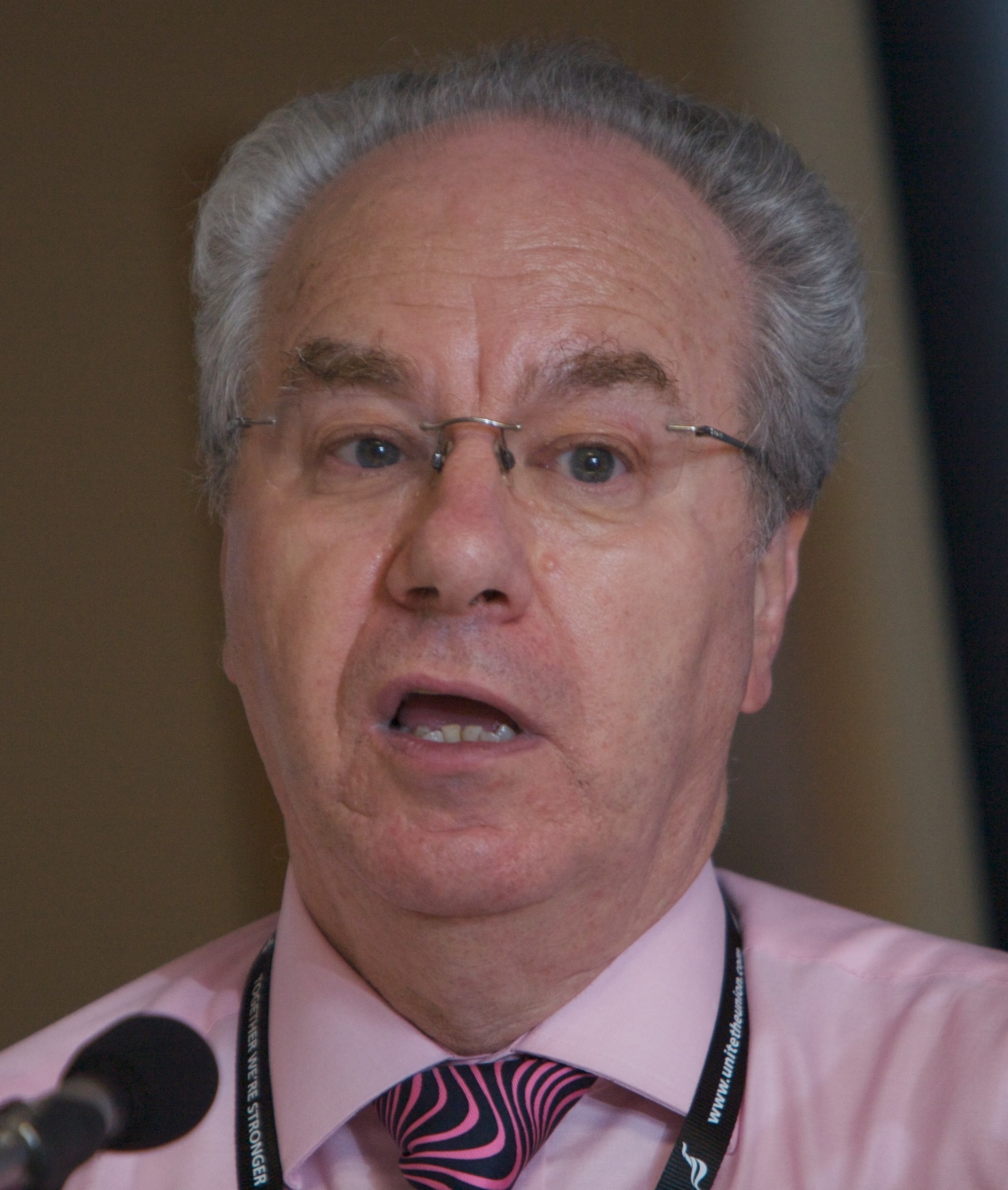
- Kellner in 2009
- Born: Peter Jon Kellner; 2 October 1946 (age 78); Lewes, Sussex, England
- Education: King's College, Cambridge
- Occupation: Journalist
- Spouse: Catherine Ashton, Baroness Ashton of Upholland (m. 1988)
- Children: 5

Peter Jon Kellner CBE (born 2 October 1946) is an English journalist, former BBC Newsnight reporter, political commentator, and former president of the YouGov opinion polling organisation in the United Kingdom. He is known for his appearances on TV, especially at election times.

== Early life ==
Kellner was born in Lewes, Sussex. His father, Michael Kellner, was an Austrian Jew, born in 1920, who emigrated to Mandatory Palestine in 1938, after Kristallnacht, and later moved to Britain.

He was educated at Haberdashers' Aske's Boys' School, Cricklewood (and later Elstree), Minchenden Grammar School, Southgate, North London, and the Royal Grammar School, Newcastle upon Tyne, and has an MA in economics and statistics from King's College, Cambridge.

== Career ==
Formerly the political analyst of the BBC Newsnight current affairs programme, Kellner was engaged by YouGov's founders, Stephan Shakespeare and Nadhim Zahawi, in December 2001. When YouGov floated for £18 million in April 2005, Kellner owned 6% of the company. He was President of YouGov from 2007 until 2016, and was its Chairman from 2001 to 2007.

From 1969 to 2003 he was a newspaper journalist with The Sunday Times, the New Statesman, The Independent, The Observer and the Evening Standard.

He has also been a visiting fellow at Nuffield College, Oxford, and the Institute for Policy Studies, London and has advised several large corporations. He was the chairman of NCVO (National Council for Voluntary Organisations) until 2019 and visiting scholar at Carnegie Europe.

In 2011, he received a Special Recognition Award from the Political Studies Association in recognition of his achievements in "bringing polling and intelligent use of numbers and figures to election coverage".

Kellner was appointed Commander of the Order of the British Empire (CBE) in the 2023 New Year Honours for charitable services as chair of the NCVO.

== Personal life ==
He is married to Catherine Ashton, Baroness Ashton of Upholland, a Labour Party politician, formerly High Representative of the European Union for Foreign Affairs and Security Policy, the first person to be so appointed. They have two children. Kellner has three other children from a previous marriage dissolved in 1988.

== Bibliography ==
- Callaghan: The Road to Number 10, (with Christopher Hitchens), Cassell, 1976 ISBN 978-0-304-29768-9
- The Civil Servants: an Inquiry into Britain's Ruling Class (with Lord Crowther-Hunt), 1980
- Democracy: 1,000 Years in Pursuit of British Liberty, Mainstream, 2009 ISBN 978-1-84596-506-8
