= 2019 Ulster Unionist Party leadership election =

- 9 November 2019
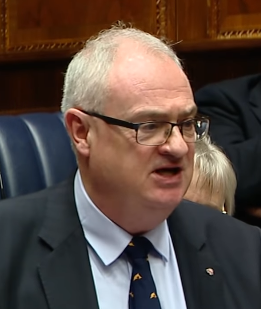
Candidate	Steve Aiken
Popular vote	Unopposed
Percentage	100%
Leader before election
Robin Swann
Elected Leader
Steve Aiken

An election for the leadership of the Ulster Unionist Party (UUP) was held on 9 November 2019 at the party's Annual General Meeting. The election followed the resignation of incumbent leader Robin Swann on 30 September 2019 after the party lost 13 councillors in the local government elections in May and failed to retain its representation in the European Parliament. The result was that South Antrim MLA Steve Aiken was elected unopposed.

Doug Beattie, MLA for Upper Bann and a retired Army Captain, was speculated as a potential candidate for the leadership. Beattie had said he would "take soundings" with regard to the leadership position. However, on 14 October 2019, the Upper Bann MLA said a contested leadership election would be a distraction. He endorsed Steve Aiken, a former Royal Navy commander who was elected MLA for South Antrim in 2016. Both Aiken and Beattie were seen as "being largely on the liberal side of the party."

On 23 October 2019, the party confirmed that Aiken was the only nomination received by officials. He was confirmed as leader on 9 November at the party's Annual General Meeting.
