= Steve Aiken =

Deputy Speaker of the Northern Ireland Assembly since 2024

Commander Steve Aiken OBE MLA
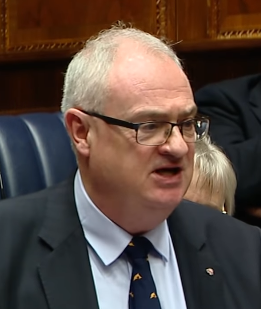

Deputy Speaker of the Northern Ireland Assembly
- Incumbent
- Assumed office 3 February 2024 Serving with Carál Ní Chuilín and John Blair
- Preceded by: Patsy McGlone

Ulster Unionist Party spokesperson for Finance
- Incumbent
- Assumed office 24 May 2021
- Leader: Doug Beattie; Mike Nesbitt

17th Leader of the Ulster Unionist Party
- In office 9 November 2019 – 27 May 2021
- Preceded by: Robin Swann
- Succeeded by: Doug Beattie

Member of the Legislative Assembly for South Antrim^{[a]}
- Incumbent
- Assumed office 5 May 2016
- Preceded by: Adrian Cochrane-Watson

Personal details
- Born: Ballyclare, Northern Ireland
- Party: Ulster Unionist Party
- Education: Britannia Royal Naval College; King's College London; University of Cambridge
- Profession: Royal Navy Commander, Submarine Warfare

Military service
- Allegiance: United Kingdom
- Branch/service: Royal Navy
- Years of service: 1980–2011
- Rank: Commander
- Unit: Submarine Service
- a. Suspended on 13 and 14 May 2024

Stephen Ronald Aiken OBE MLA is a Northern Irish politician, serving as the Deputy Speaker of the Northern Ireland Assembly since 2024.

A member of the Ulster Unionist Party (UUP), he was party leader from 2019 to 2021, having previously served as Chief Whip from 2017 to 2019.

Aiken has been a Member of the Legislative Assembly (MLA) for South Antrim since 2016, although he received a brief suspension in May 2024 after being sanctioned for breaching the "confidentiality" of the assembly complaints process.

== Early life and education ==
Aiken was born in South Antrim, attended Thompson Primary School, Ballyrobert, and then was educated at Belfast High School. He joined the Sea Cadets in 1982 based at HMS Caroline (1914), which remains in its original dock as a Museum Ship. During his naval career he undertook further study and holds a PhD and MPhil in International Relations from the Department of Politics and International Relations at the University of Cambridge, with his thesis research on India and its growing military power. He also has a MA in Defence Studies from the Department of Defence Studies at King's College London.

== Military career ==
Aiken served for 32 years in the Royal Navy as a submariner, ultimately in many senior operational roles, including commanding two nuclear-powered submarines, being Joint Plans Officer for operations in the Middle-East in 2002–04 (for which he was appointed an Officer of the Order of the British Empire (OBE)). At the end of his service in the Royal Navy, he became the founding CEO of the British Irish Chamber of Commerce, a post he held for three years during which time he lived in Dublin with his family.

== Political career ==
Aiken was one of three Ulster Unionist Party (UUP) candidates to run in South Antrim at the 2016 Northern Ireland Assembly election. He was elected on the seventh count, with 3,280 first-preference votes (9.3%), being the only UUP candidate to be returned in the constituency.

At the 2017 Assembly election, Aiken was re-elected on the fifth count with 14.8% of first-preferences

=== Leader of the Ulster Unionist Party ===
When Robin Swann MLA announced his sudden resignation as leader of the Ulster Unionist Party in 2019, Aiken stood for the leadership. He was elected unopposed as leader in November 2019 and led the party through difficult periods addressing concerns about Brexit, the Protocol and pandemic. He promptly opted for the UUP to take the Ministry of Health Department, when no other party would take it, and appointed Mr Swann MLA as Minister. He announced his resignation as leader eighteen months later because he held a firm position that the Chief Constable needed to resign in 2021.

=== Post-leadership ===
In October 2021 Aiken was reselected to be a UUP candidate for South Antrim in the 2022 Northern Ireland Assembly election. He was reelected in the May 2022 poll and, despite the lack of a functioning Northern Ireland Assembly since February 2022, he continues to serve the people of South Antrim and remains the Party Spokesperson on the Northern Ireland Protocol and Finance, in addition to his private consulting business.

==== Suspension from the Assembly ====
In 2024, Aiken received a two-day suspension from the Assembly after being accused of breaching the "confidentiality" of the assembly complaints process. The standards committee recommended a sanction over Aiken disclosing a complaint he had made against another MLA. On 7 May 2024, MLAs backed a motion to suspend him from attending business on the 13th and 14 May. Alliance MLA Paula Bradshaw called on Aiken to consider his position as deputy speaker.

==== Row with Nuala McAllister ====
On 9 September 2025, while sitting in the chair as deputy speaker, Aiken clashed with Alliance MLA Nuala McAllister, after she accused of him of "patronising behaviour." This occurred after the Minister for Education, Paul Givan, delivered a statement in the Assembly chamber, during which Aiken responded to McAllister's point of order with "just a second, just a second, just a second". Once Givan had finished his statement, Aiken invited McAllister to speak, during which she told Aiken that she "did not need to be patronised." Aiken then asked McAllister to withdraw her remarks, which she refused to do so, and was asked to leave the chamber as a result.

Northern Ireland Assembly
Preceded by Adrian Cochrane-Watson	Member of the Legislative Assembly for South Antrim; 2016–present	Incumbent
