= Catherine O'Neill, Countess of Tyrone =

Irish aristocrat (died 1619)

Catherine Magennis
- Countess of Tyrone
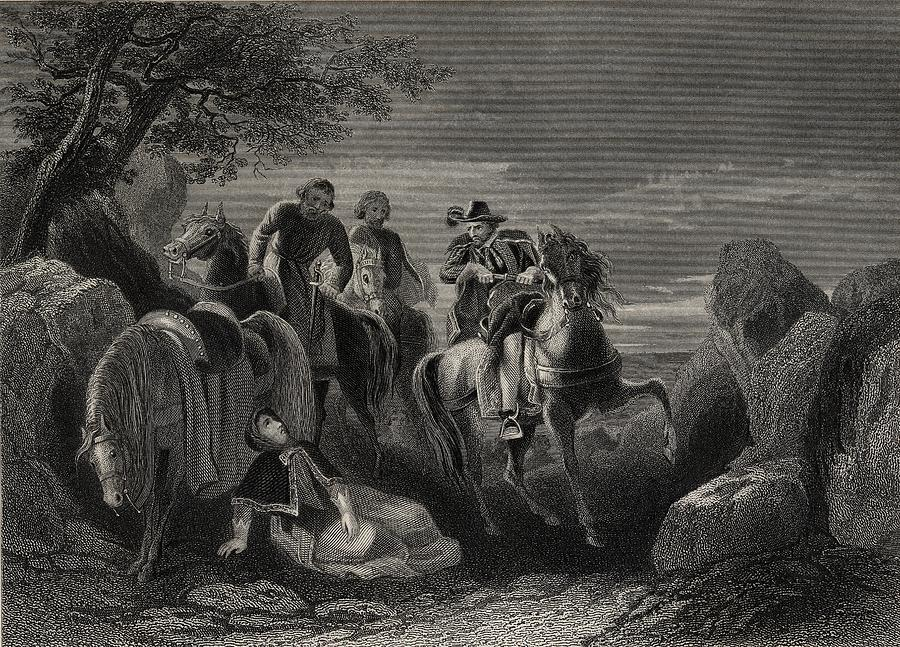
- 19th-century engraving of Catherine's husband Hugh O'Neill coercing her to depart Ireland
- Born: Before 1574; Ulster, Ireland
- Died: 15 March 1619; Naples, Italy
- Spouse: Hugh O'Neill, Earl of Tyrone (m. 1597; died 1616)
- Issue: Shane O'Neill, 3rd Earl of Tyrone; Brian O'Neill; Conn O'Neill
- Father: Hugh Magennis, Baron of Iveagh
- Mother: Annabel Reilly

Catherine O'Neill, Countess of Tyrone (née Magennis; before 1574 – 15 March 1619) was an Irish aristocrat. She was the fourth and final wife of Hugh O'Neill, Earl of Tyrone, a prominent Irish lord during the late Elizabethan and early Stuart eras.

Catherine was from the Magennis sept, a powerful family in County Down which enjoyed favour from the Crown. Refined and well-educated, she was betrothed to O'Neill in a political marriage during the Nine Years' War. Due to increasing hostility against her husband and his allies, Catherine reluctantly fled to mainland Europe in 1607. She was separated from her children and settled with her husband in Rome, receiving minimal support from Philip III of Spain and Pope Paul V. After her husband's death in 1616, Catherine faced major financial difficulties and constantly petitioned the Spanish government for their assistance. She died in Naples with many payments in arrears.

== Early life ==
Catherine was born into the Magennis family of Rathfriland, one of the most powerful families in early Ulster. She was born no later than 1573. (Note: She was "more than half" her husband's age when they married c. 1597. Her husband Hugh O'Neill was born c. 1550.) Her father was Sir Hugh Magennis, Baron of Iveagh, who had married Lady Annabel Reilly. Catherine's father was in favour with the Crown. He was granted his territory and Barony by the English, and was described as "the civilest of all the Irish in those parts".

Catherine was raised at the family seat at Dundrum Castle, County Down, which overlooked Dundrum Bay and the Mourne Mountains. She was well-educated and "accustomed to a comfortable way of life", and was reputed to be a lady of "excellent education and character". Peter Lombard described her as "young in years indeed, but full grown in education, character, prudence and piety". Like her husband's previous wife Mabel Bagenal, she was said to be young and attractive.

== Marriage ==
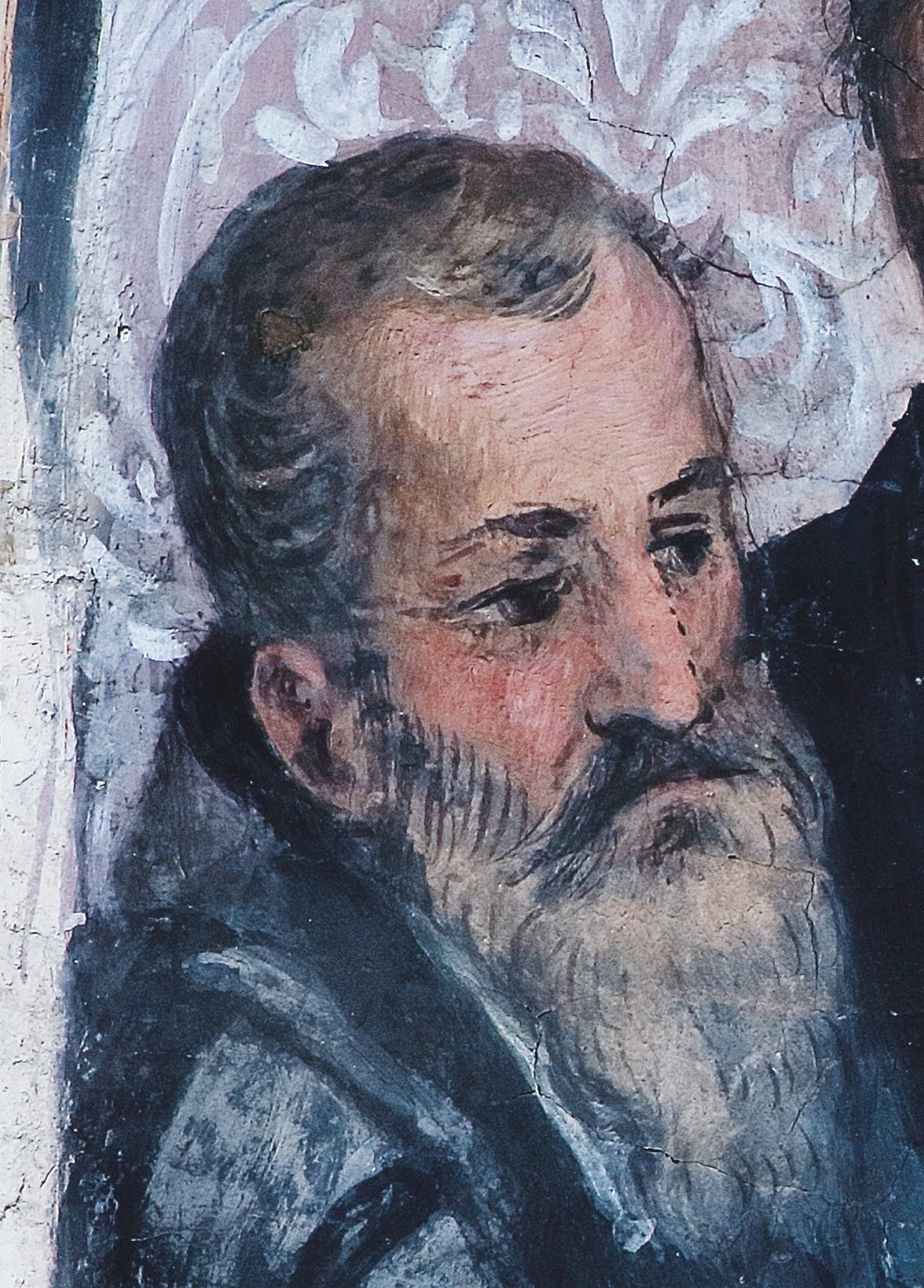
Catherine's husband, Hugh O'Neill, Earl of Tyrone

When her father died in 1596, he was succeeded by her brother Arthur Roe Magennis. Arthur joined the Irish confederacy in the Nine Years' War against England. The unification between the Magennis family and confederacy leader Hugh O'Neill was sealed with Catherine's betrothal to O’Neill. (Note: Arthur had previously married O'Neill's daughter Sarah, and he was later made 1st Viscount Iveagh by James VI and I.) Their marriage was very unlike O'Neill's "whirlwind courtship" of Mabel Bagenal - this was a political marriage maneuvered by the Magennis family. The couple married sometime before 6 June 1597. Catherine was O'Neill's fourth and final wife. O'Neill jilted the daughter of Angus MacDonald, 8th of Dunnyveg, to marry Catherine instead.

In 1597, a night-time raid forced Catherine and her husband to flee into the woods in the south of Armagh. Two years later, Catherine was present in O'Neill’s camp outside Newry, whilst pregnant. One English officer noted that at this time, the confederates often travelled with their wives, probably because the Crown's failed 1599 Irish campaign created a sense of safety in the Irish.

Despite victories at the Battle of the Yellow Ford and Battle of Curlew Pass, around 1602 the Irish alliance began to suffer major losses due to Lord Deputy Mountjoy's scorched earth tactics. This put a great deal of pressure on O'Neill, now in his middle age. Upset with setbacks, he began drinking heavily and took his frustrations out on Catherine.

Catherine and O'Neill had three sons: Shane (1599 – 1641), Conn Ruadh (c. 1602 – in or after 1622), and Brian (c. 1604 – 1617). Catherine also had many elder step-children from her husband's past relationships.

== Post-war ==
O'Neill's surrender in March 1603 marked the end of the Nine Years' War. Throughout 1603–1607, O'Neill was repeatedly antagonised by English officials who wished to see his undoing. Despite the terms of his treaty with the Crown, O'Neill continued his correspondence with the Spanish government. This was unknown to Catherine.

Reportedly O’Neill considered "putting away" Catherine in December 1605, and it was rumored that he had assembled a group of clerics to explore his options. In response to this, Catherine allegedly confronted her husband, warning him that if he didn't stop his abuse, she "would discover him so far as to infer again to rebellion or to lose his head." O'Neill dismissed his plan.

English administrator Arthur Chichester heard about the strain on their marriage, and sent officer Toby Caulfield to recruit Catherine as a double agent. According to Caulfield, Catherine was in a "querulous and complaining humour." She complained she was "weary of [her husband's] unquiet life". Caulfield confided that he could protect her from O'Neill’s "drunken tyranny" and she could "be revenged on him for all his injuries at once." In return, he requested information about O’Neill’s war plans. Catherine responded that she had no such information and "would not, for all the world, however, much she hated him, be known to accuse him of anything that should endanger his life." She also swore that O'Neill would never impart such secrets to her. Nevertheless, she deflected Caulfield by pledging to stay vigilant of O'Neill's anti-English activities.

== Flight of the Earls ==
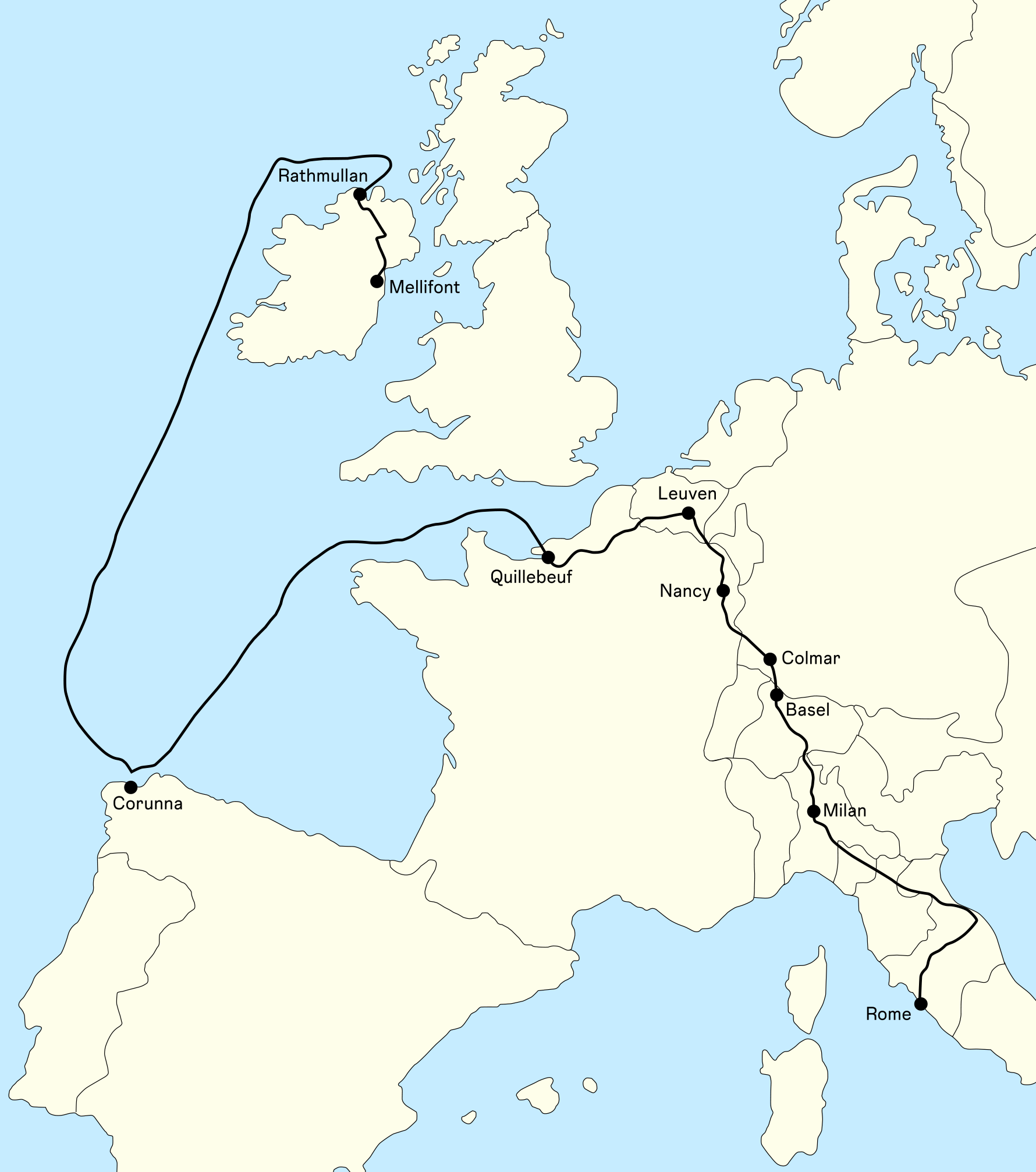
Catherine's journey from Rathmullan to Rome

In September 1607, potentially facing arrest for treasonous activities, Catherine's husband made a "snap decision" to leave Ireland for continental Europe, along with ninety of his followers. He arrived at their Dungannon residence, collected Catherine and sent out messengers to gather their three children. Shane and Brian arrived in time, but five-year-old Conn, who was living with his foster-family, could not be located. O'Neill "sought him diligently, but... was overtaken with shortness of time."

Catherine was reluctant to leave her life in Ireland, and particularly upset by Conn's absence. According to an English account of their departure, "the countess being exceedingly weary slipped down from her horse and weeping said she could go no further." O'Neill responded by threatening her with his sword "if she did not pass on with him and put on a more cheerful countenance".

Catherine ultimately accompanied her husband and two sons into exile. Conditions on their boat were extremely poor, with the noblewomen on the boat especially troubled by the harsh journey. They arrived in France, not Spain as expected, due to storms; they then made their way north to the Spanish Netherlands. Many of the noblewomen were compelled to leave their children behind in St Anthony's College, Leuven, under the supervision of the Franciscans. Catherine reluctantly left Shane and Brian in Leuven, then continued with her husband to Rome.

For part of the journey, the women had to abandon their coaches and travel through the harsh winter on horseback. For a well-educated, high-born noble such as Catherine, her new circumstances would have been extremely upsetting and isolating. In Rome, the couple received a small pension from Pope Paul V.

Lord Deputy Arthur Chichester placed Conn in the custody of English officer Sir Tobias Caulfeild. Caulfeild received a warrant allowing him to seize Catherine's goods "in consideration that [Caulfeild] had kept the child in his own care, and found him in meat and drink".

== Life on the Continent ==
Once she was settled in Rome, Catherine's distress did not subside. She found the Italian climate, the separation from her children, and her diminished lifestyle all unacceptable. Catherine asked to return to Leuven to reunite with her children, but her petitions were constantly denied by Spanish authorities. It seems her husband also refused to let her relocate to Leuven. When Catherine pleaded for her health, frequently complaining about the "city's air", the authorities suggested she go to Naples or Sicily. A doctor who arrived in Rome to attend to her ailing husband confirmed that Catherine was sick. He treated her and she showed marked improvement.

It has been suggested that in Rome she had an affair with Robert Lombard, the nephew of Peter Lombard, the Catholic Archbishop of Armagh, who was a noted supporter of the Earl. Robert Lombard was a spy for the Crown and may have attempted to get information from the Countess about her husband, which he relayed on to London and Dublin. The proposed timing of the "affair" coincides with Peter Lombard moving out of the residence he shared with the Earl for seven years.

Hugh O'Neill died on 20 July 1616, and Catherine was left with the responsibilities for O'Neill's family and retainers. In August 1617, Catherine's son Brian, aged 13, was found hanged in his bedroom in Brussels. Historians Paul Walsh and John O'Hart believe Brian was murdered by an English assassin. Catherine's step-sons Hugh and Henry died from illness in 1609 and 1610 respectively. These deaths only intensified her increasing isolation. Furthermore, she became estranged from her oldest son Shane over her late husband's will. According to the will, she would receive 172 crowns per month - short of her Spanish pension of 550 crowns per month. The remaining 378 crowns per month would be split amongst O'Neill's dependents. However, if Catherine failed to maintained "herself honorably,... not a penny is to be given to her."

The unhappy retainers asked the late earl's secretary, Henry O'Hagan, to inform Shane that his mother was refusing to give them the money bequeathed to them. The claimants asked for Shane's support and even suggested that Catherine be "enclosed in a convent of nuns". They cautioned Shane to send someone to Rome, to deposit his late father's money and valuable in a bank before Catherine could. Historian Jerrold Casway believes this saga exposes the Irish refugees' "extreme dependency", as well as Catherine's estrangement from her husband and his retainers.

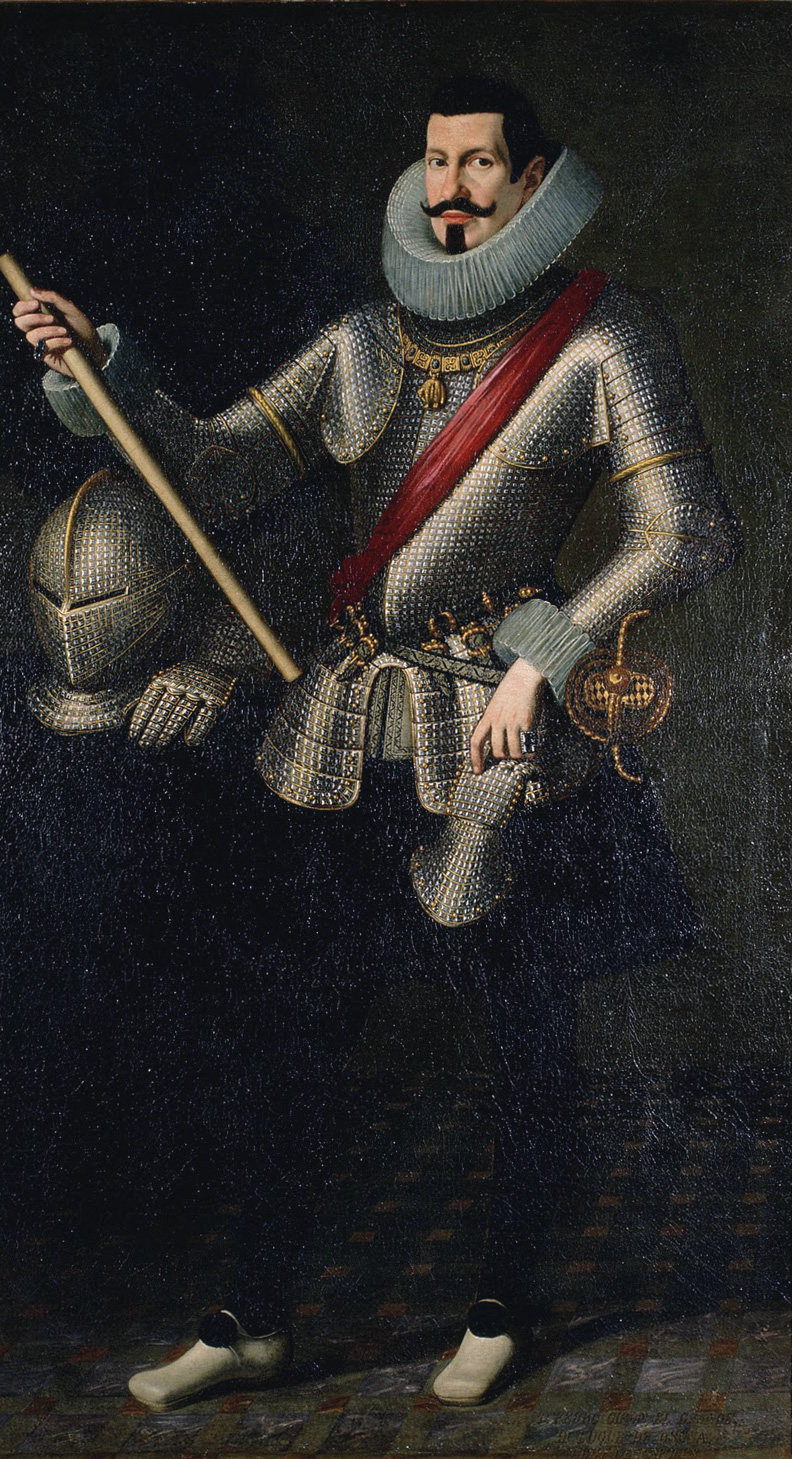
Catherine's benefactor, the Duke of Osuna

Shane and Catherine disputed over her share of the Earl's pension as well as the maintenance of his dependents. The late Earl's trusted friend and former Spanish ambassador to Rome, Count de Castro, asked Philip III of Spain for compassion towards Catherine's "miserable state, alone and without property in a foreign land... with no other protection than that of Your Majesty." He requested funds to allow Catherine to "travel proportionate to her quality and to the manner in which she must be escorted". After much debate, Phillip concurred. In September 1616, he directed Castro's successor, Cardinal Borja y Velasco, to grant Catherine the same allowance as her late husband, to the frustration of O'Neill's dependents.

Despite the royal grant, Catherine failed to receive any compensation, and without this the dependents also suffered. Throughout 1617 she unsuccessfully petitioned for her monthly stipend. She eventually escaped to Naples to evade creditors, to alleviate her poor health and to be closer to her new benefactor Pedro Téllez-Girón, 3rd Duke of Osuna. On 22 June 1618, Catherine described herself to Philip III as "this afflicted and unprotected widow," who feared "less to die of hunger than to become the ridicule of the English." In response, Philip ordered a prompt payment to her.

== Death and legacy ==
Catherine died on 15 March 1619 in Naples, (Note: Robert Dunlop and George Edward Cokayne incorrectly believed that Catherine died in 1607 in Leuven.) in poor health and with many unpaid pension payments still owed to her. Shane, then a colonel in the Spanish army, was greatly upset by her death. Modern historians characterise Catherine's life on the Continent as tragic and lonely. Her fate highlights the extreme dependency faced by the Irish refugees and embodies the high-risk politics typical of her husband's marriages.

Conn, her son left behind in Ireland, was raised in England and educated at Eton College as a Protestant. He was committed to the Tower of London on 12 August 1622, where he probably died.
