= Brian O'Neill (died 1617) =

17th-century Irish noble (1604–1617)

- Born: c. 1604; Ulster, Ireland
- Died: 16 August 1617 (aged 13); Brussels, Spanish Netherlands
- Cause of death: Hanging
- Buried: St Anthony's College, Leuven
- Noble family: O'Neill dynasty
- Father: Hugh O'Neill, Earl of Tyrone
- Mother: Catherine Magennis

Brian O'Neill (c. 1604 – 16 August 1617), also known as Bernard or Con Brian, was the youngest son of Irish lord Hugh O'Neill, Earl of Tyrone. He joined his parents on the Flight of the Earls and was later found dead in Brussels, possibly killed by an English assassin.

== Family ==
Brian O'Neill was a son of Irish lord Hugh O'Neill, Earl of Tyrone, and his fourth wife Catherine Magennis. Tyrone was Chief of the Name of the O'Neill clan, Tír Eoghain's ruling Gaelic Irish noble family. Catherine, Countess of Tyrone, was born into the Magennis family of Rathfriland.

Brian had two full-brothers, Conn and Shane. Born c. 1604, Brian was Tyrone's youngest son. Shane was born in 1599, and Conn was born c. 1602.

== Flight of the Earls ==
Brian, Shane and their parents took part in the Flight of the Earls, leaving Ireland for mainland Europe in September 1607. Conn could not be located in time, and was left behind in Ireland. As the Irish refugees travelled through Europe, Brian and Shane were left in Leuven in the care of Irish Franciscans. Their parents continued to Rome. The brothers were raised at St Anthony's College in the company of fellow infant nobles Hugh Albert O'Donnell (son of Rory O'Donnell, 1st Earl of Tyrconnell) and Hugh O'Donnell (son of Cathbarr O'Donnell). At the age of nine, Brian became a page to Archduke Albert VII, Archduke of Austria.

== Death ==
At 6pm on 16 August 1617, Brian was found dead in his bedroom in Brussels. His death was under suspicious circumstances, as he had been hanged with his hands tied behind his back. His tutor, Fr. Nicholas Aylmer, was absent as he had gone to procure lodgings for him near the summer residence of the archdukes. Ensign Cormack (brother to Owen Roe O'Neill) attended the youngsters and was investigated, but no foul play was determined. According to historians Casway and Dunlop, at the time, his cause of death was not conclusively proven. However, Fr. Donagh Mooney wrote that "the inquest was held, and it was shown beyond doubt that the boy was foully murdered".

Paul Walsh calls Brian's death an "assassinat[ion]". John O'Hart says Brian was "strangled in his bedroom in Brussels... by an English assassin". Conversely, Jerrold Casway states that Brian died "as the result of an accident during a children's game".

Brian was thirteen years old at the time of his death, predeceasing his mother Catherine. His death caused great despair and isolation in his mother, who had lost her husband only the previous year. Brian's body was brought to Leuven and buried at St Anthony's College.

Fr. Mooney described Brian as "a fair child, in sooth,... devout, fond of books, learned men, military science, in which, had God spared him, he might one day have rivalled his illustrious father".
