= Conn O'Neill (prisoner) =

Seventeenth-century Irish noble and prisoner

Conn Ruadh O'Neill
- Other names: Conn na Creige
- Born: c. 1602; Ulster, Ireland
- Died: In or after 1622; Tower of London, London, England
- Father: Hugh O'Neill, Earl of Tyrone
- Mother: Catherine Magennis

Conn Ruadh O'Neill (Irish: Conn Ruadh Ó Néill; c. 1602 – in/after 1622), also known as Conn na Creige ("Conn of the rock"), was an Irish noble of the seventeenth century.

He was a son of Hugh O'Neill, Earl of Tyrone. Conn was left behind during the Flight of the Earls. English authorities planned to re-educate Conn as a Protestant by paying for him to attend Eton College. Eventually Conn was imprisoned in the Tower of London, where he likely died.

== Family background ==
Conn Ruadh O'Neill was the son of Irish lord Hugh O'Neill, Earl of Tyrone, leader of the Irish confederacy during the Nine Years' War (1594–1603). The O'Neill dynasty were the most powerful Gaelic family in Ulster. Conn's mother was Tyrone's fourth wife Catherine O'Neill, Countess of Tyrone, of the Magennis family of Iveagh. Conn had two full-brothers, Brian and Shane.

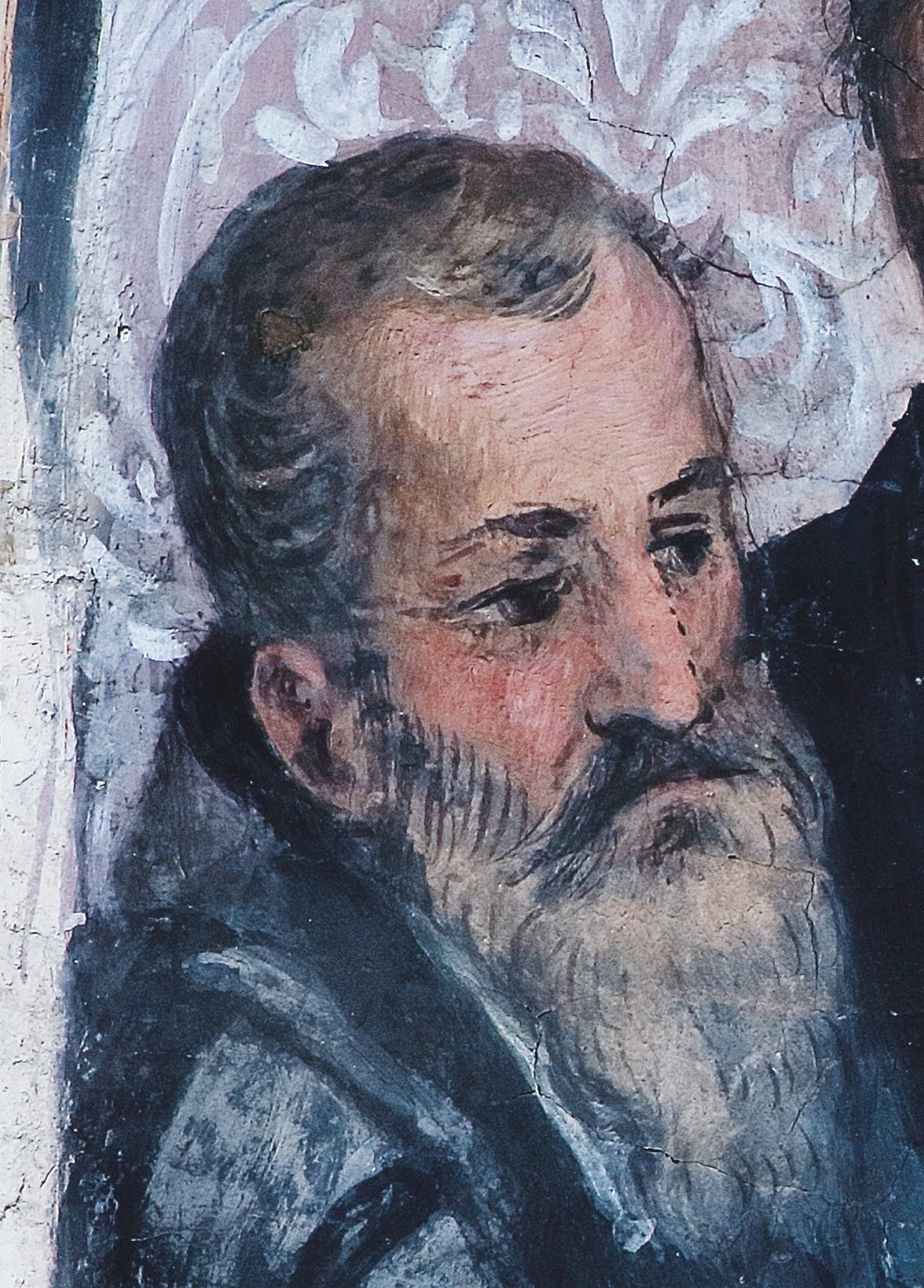
Conn's father, Hugh O'Neill, Earl of Tyrone

According to historian Paul Walsh, "Conn O'Neill is commonly believed to have been Tyrone's youngest son; but he was seven or eight years old in 1609 and consequently born before Brian". This would mean Conn was born around 1602. Historian Jerrold Casway corroborates this with his statement that Conn was five years old at the time of the Flight of the Earls, which occurred in September 1607. Conversely, Charles Patrick Meehan believes that Conn was seven years old at that time, meaning he would be born around 1600. An article in Irish Historical Studies also states that Conn was seven years old at the time of the Flight. This article also corroborates Walsh and Casway's belief that Conn was the second of Tyrone and Catherine's children. Shane was born in October 1599 and Brian was born c. 1604.

== Family's flight from Ireland ==
Conn was left behind when Tyrone, Catherine and other supporters departed Ireland during the Flight of the Earls in 1607. The Flight was apparently a snap decision on Tyrone's part as he feared arrest from the English government. Tyrone sent out messengers to gather his children from their foster-families. However, Conn was living with his foster-family and could not be located in time. Tyrone "sought him diligently, but... was overtaken with shortness of time." Conn's mother Catherine was particularly upset by his absence and reluctant to leave Ireland. Tyrone threatened Catherine with his sword if she did not hurry to the boat and "put on a more cheerful countenance".

== Raised by the Crown ==
=== Ireland ===
Lord Deputy Arthur Chichester ordered a search for Conn, and the young boy was found. Chichester charged Sir Tobias Caulfeild with taking Conn into the custody of the Crown. Conn was taken by Caulfeild from his fosterers and lodged in Castle Caulfield at Charlemont. Caulfield kept the boy under close surveillance, in case any Irish relatives attempted to interfere with the boy's anglicised upbringing. Whilst staying there, "the eyes of the people were much fixed upon [Conn]". Tobias Caulfield received a warrant allowing him to seize Catherine's goods "in consideration that [Caulfield] had kept the child in his own care, and found him in meat and drink".

In a letter to Dublin's Privy Council dated 4 July 1609, Chichester suggested that the children of former Irish confederacy members should be sent to England and put to trades, so that they might "forget their fierceness and pride." Chichester referenced Conn specifically; "there is a son of the Earl of Tyrone of some seven or eight years old". Chichester declared that the best course would be "to send [the children] to some remote parts of England or Scotland to be kept from the knowledge of friends or acquaintances."

Many of Conn's brothers died on the Continent shortly after the flight. His elder half-brothers Hugh and Henry died in 1609 and 1610 respectively. However, Conn quickly became the focus of plots to make him the figurehead of an uprising, notably the Ulster Conspiracy of 1615. Allegedly, a goal of the conspiracy was "to take away Conn ne Kreigy O Neile, son to the Earl of Tyrone, from Charlemont." In order to prevent this plot, Chichester ordered that Conn be sent to Dublin for safekeeping. King James I already planned to have "the sonnes of divers noblemen and gentlemen" of Ireland sent to England to be raised in the English manner. James ultimately sent Conn to England. In response, Tyrone stated that "a son of mine is even now being reared in heresy, but I trust in God that the blood he has in his veins will not permit such a deception, and that one day he will avenge me for this outrage".

=== England ===
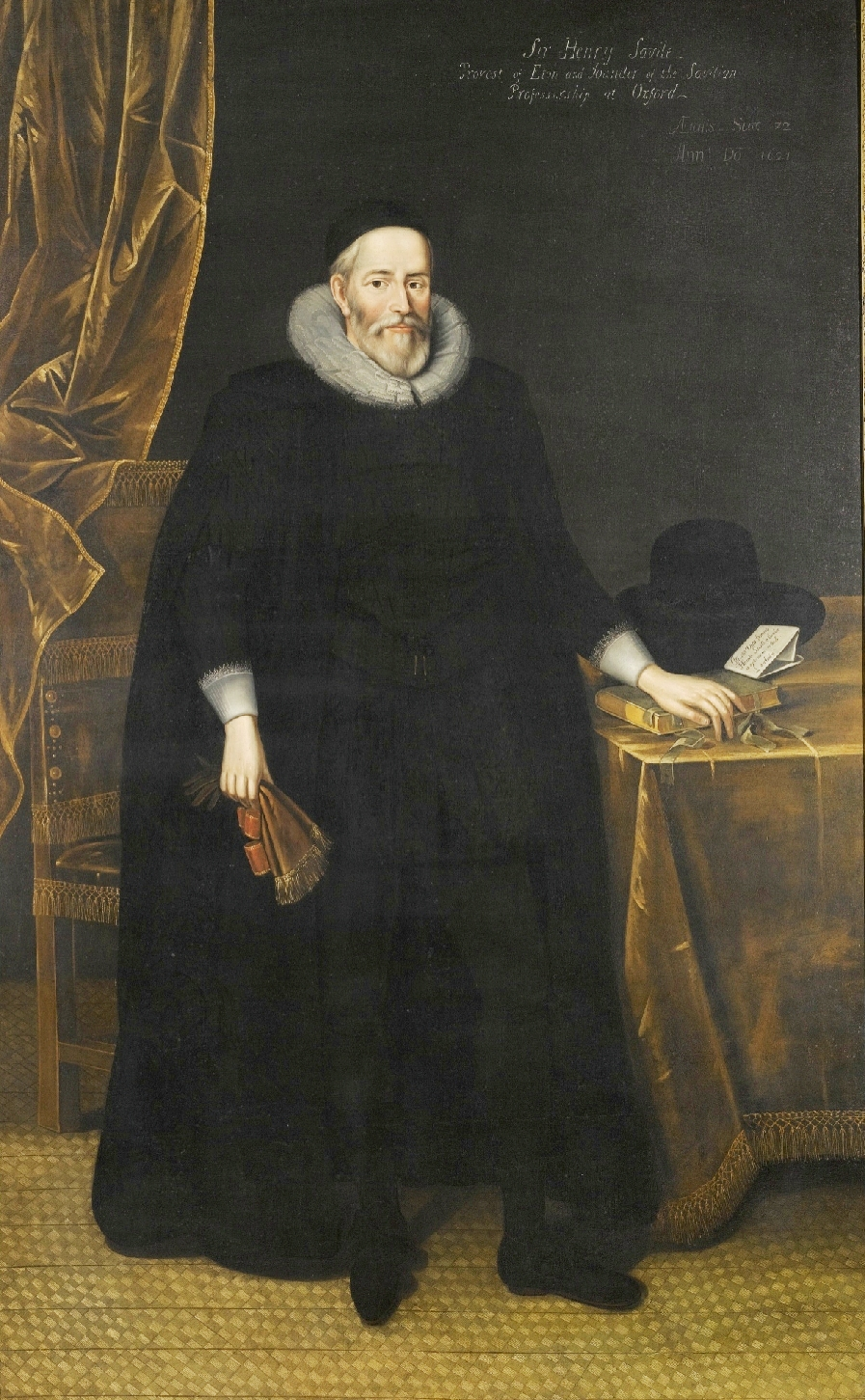
Henry Savile, provost of Eton College, was put in charge of Conn and his education.

Conn was conducted to England in June 1615 by Francis Blundel. Conn's travel from Dublin to England cost £40. He was installed at Eton College and was educated there as a Protestant and a fellow-commoner. The English Privy Council put Henry Savile, the provost of Eton, in charge of Conn. Savile was advised "to have [Conn] brought up in vertue and religion" and was warned to keep a watchful eye over Conn's tutors.

The Crown spent a further £51 on "apparel, bedding and other necessaries" for Conn at Eton. Conn also had a servant attend him—in October, the Privy Council appointed George Pierson as Conn's servant. All of Conn's expenses were paid for by the King.

Conn entered Eton in the third quarter of 1615. His father died in Rome in July 1616, and Conn's elder brother Shane was recognised by the Spanish as the successive Earl of Tyrone.

== Tower of London ==
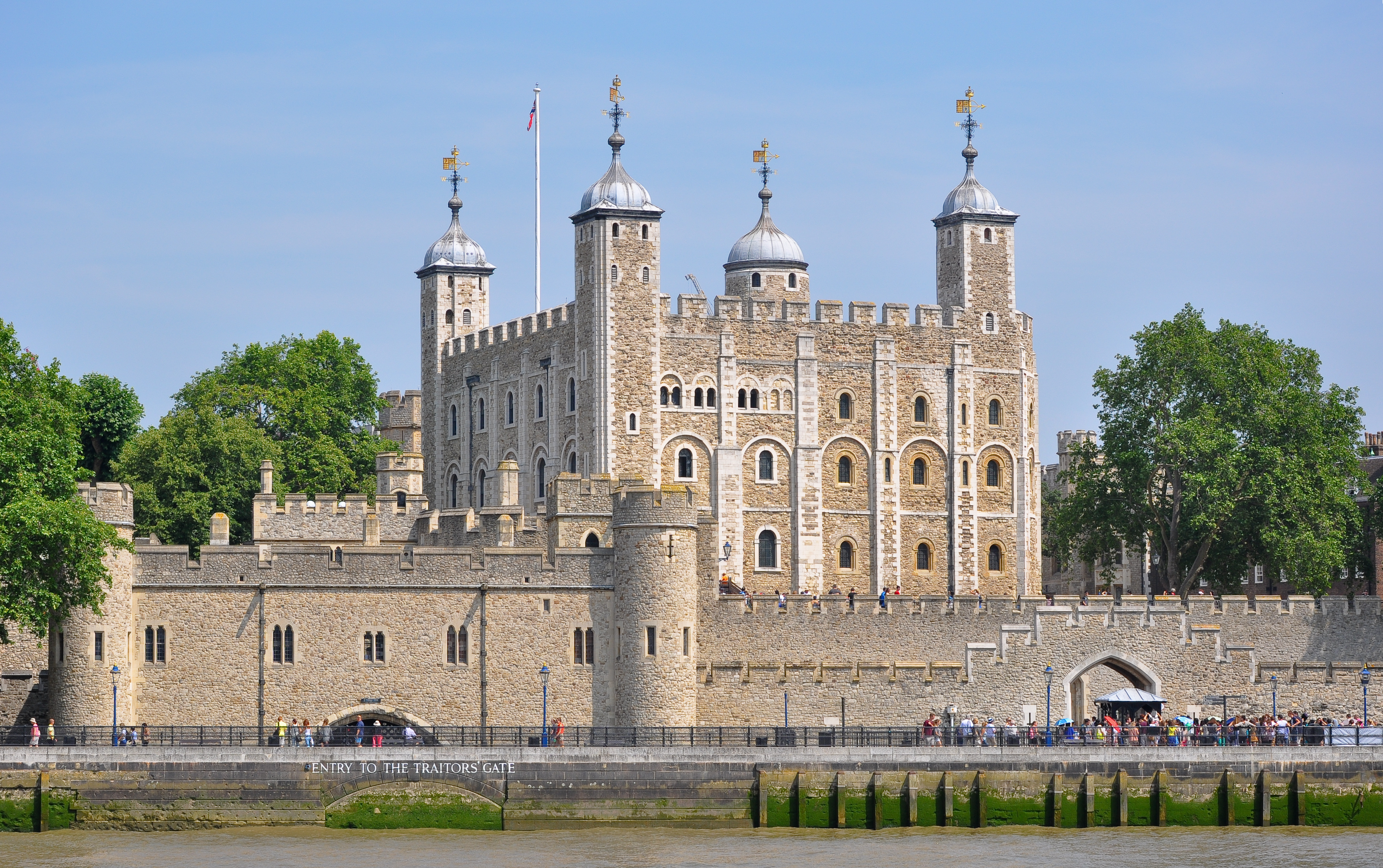
It is likely Conn Ruadh O'Neill died during his imprisonment in the Tower of London.

Conn was abruptly pulled out of Eton in the third quarter of 1622, and the provost was ordered to deliver him to a messenger of the Crown. Conn was then brought to Whitehall in London.

On 12 August 1622, Conn was committed to the Tower of London. Conn was held in the Tower with a number of his relatives of the O'Neill and O'Donnell dynasties and may have lived in some comfort as was common for a nobleman. It is not known exactly when he died, or whether he was ever released. The last record of him is from 1622. Historian Robert Dunlop believes this is when Conn died. Historians Jerrold Casway and John McGurk believe Conn died in the Tower, most likely from starvation and neglect.

According to John O'Hart, Conn had a son named Feardorach. It is possible O'Hart has confused Conn with Tyrone's eldest son Conn, who had a son named Feardorach who took part in the Flight of the Earls.

== Bibliography ==
- Casway, Jerrold (1984). Owen Roe O'Neill and the Struggle for Catholic Ireland. Digitized by the Internet Archive in 2022 with funding from Kahle/Austin Foundation. Philadelphia: University of Pennsylvania Press. ISBN 0-8122-7895-X.
- Casway, Jerrold (2003). "Heroines or Victims? The Women of the Flight of the Earls". New Hibernia Review / Iris Éireannach Nua. 7 (1): 56–74. ISSN 1092-3977. JSTOR 20557855.
- Casway, Jerrold (2016). "Catherine Magennis and the Wives of Hugh O'Neill". Seanchas Ardmhacha: Journal of the Armagh Diocesan Historical Society. 26 (1): 69–79. ISSN 0488-0196.
- Dunlop, Robert (1895). "O'Neill, Hugh, third Baron of Dungannon and second Earl of Tyrone 1540?–1616". In Lee, Sidney (ed.). Dictionary of National Biography. Vol. XLII. New York: MacMillan and Co. pp. 188–196. OCLC 8544105.
- McGurk, John (2007). "The Flight of the Earls: Escape or Strategic Regrouping?". History Ireland. 15 (4): 16–21. ISSN 0791-8224. JSTOR 27725653.
- Meehan, Charles Patrick (1868). The fate and fortunes of Hugh O'Neill, earl of Tyrone, and Rory O'Donel, earl of Tyrconnel; their flight from Ireland, their vicissitudes abroad, and their death in exile. Dublin: J. Duffy. OCLC 1591572.
- Moody, T. W.; Willis, Richard; Bust, Matthew; Grevyll, Fulke; Sotherton, Jo.; Bromley, Edw.; Denham, Jo. (September 1940). "The School-Bills of Conn O'Neill at Eton, 1615-22". Irish Historical Studies. 2 (6): 189–205. ISSN 0021-1214.
- Morgan, Hiram (1993). Tyrone's Rebellion: The outbreak of the Nine Years' War in Tudor Ireland. London: The Boydell Press. ISBN 0-85115-683-5.
- O'Hart, John (1892). Irish Pedigrees: Or, the Origin and Stem of the Irish Nation. Vol. I (5th ed.). Dublin: James Duffy & Co. OCLC 7239210.
- Walsh, Paul (1930). Walsh, Paul (ed.). THE WILL AND FAMILY OF HUGH O NEILL, EARL OF TYRONE [WITH AN APPENDIX OF GENEALOGIES] (PDF). Dublin: Sign of the Three Candles.
- Walsh, Micheline (April 1957). The O'Neills in Spain (PDF). Archived (PDF) from the original on 1 July 2024.
- Walsh, Micheline (1974). "The Will of John O'Neill, Third Earl of Tyrone". Seanchas Ardmhacha: Journal of the Armagh Diocesan Historical Society. 7 (2): 320–325. doi:10.2307/29740847. JSTOR 29740847.
- Walsh, Micheline Kerney (1996). An exile of Ireland, Hugh O'Neill, Prince of Ulster. Dublin: Four Courts Press. ISBN 978-1-85182-234-8.
