= 2005 Carrickfergus Borough Council election =

Local government election in Northern Ireland

← 2001	5 May 2005	2011 →

All 17 seats to Carrickfergus Borough Council 9 seats needed for a majority
	First party	Second party	Third party
Party	DUP	UUP	Alliance
Seats won	8	4	3
Seat change	▲2	Steady	▼2
	Fourth party
Party	Independent
Seats won	2
Seat change	Steady
- Party with the most votes by district.

Elections to Carrickfergus Borough Council were held on 5 May 2005 on the same day as the other Northern Irish local government elections. The election used three district electoral areas to elect a total of 17 councillors.

== Election results ==
Carrickfergus Borough Council Election Result 2005
Party	Seats	Gains	Losses	Net gain/loss	Seats %	Votes %	Votes	+/−
DUP	8	2	0	▲2	47.1	43.3	6,015	▲11.5
UUP	4	0	0	Steady	23.5	18.0	2,508	▼6.2
Alliance	3	0	2	▼2	17.6	23.2	3,218	▼0.3
Independent	2	0	0	Steady	11.8	15.5	2,159	▼2.2

Note: "Votes" are the first preference votes.

== Districts summary ==
Results of the Carrickfergus Borough Council election, 2005 by district
Ward	%	Cllrs	%	Cllrs	%	Cllrs	%	Cllrs	Total Cllrs
Ward	DUP		UUP		Alliance		Others		Total Cllrs
Carrick Castle	41.1	2	9.1	1	26.3	1	23.5	1	5
Kilroot	42.0	3	14.1	1	23.5	1	20.4	1	6
Knockagh Monument	45.9	3	27.5	2	20.9	1	5.7	0	6
Total	43.3	8	18.0	4	23.2	3	15.5	2	17

== Districts results ==
=== Carrick Castle ===
2001: 2 x DUP, 1 x Alliance, 1 x UUP, 1 x Independent
2005: 2 x DUP, 1 x Alliance, 1 x UUP, 1 x Independent
2001-2005 Change: No change

Carrick Castle - 5 seats
Party	Candidate	FPv%	Count			
Party	Candidate	FPv%	1	2	3	4
DUP	David Hilditch*	34.96%	1,052			
Alliance	Sean Neeson*	26.32%	792			
DUP	Patricia McKinney*	6.18%	186	612.12		
Independent	William Hamilton*	13.99%	421	477.18	570.46	
UUP	Darin Ferguson*	9.14%	275	312.63	415.59	494.34
Independent	Philip Mannis	6.75%	203	214.66	230.94	243.33
Independent	Nicholas Wady	2.66%	80	89.01	162.05	177.59
Electorate: 5,944 Valid: 3,009 (50.62%) Spoilt: 83 Quota: 502 Turnout: 3,092 (52.02%)

=== Kilroot ===
2001: 2 x DUP, 2 x Alliance, 1 x UUP, 1 x Independent
2005: 3 x DUP, 1 x Alliance, 1 x UUP, 1 x Independent
2001-2005 Change: DUP gain from Alliance

Kilroot - 6 seats
Party	Candidate	FPv%	Count				
Party	Candidate	FPv%	1	2	3	4	5
DUP	Billy Ashe*	31.05%	1,775				
Independent	James Brown*	20.33%	1,162				
DUP	Terence Clements*	6.56%	375	1,178.52			
UUP	Eric Ferguson*	10.88%	622	650.08	673.83	820.15	
Alliance	Isobel Day	12.40%	709	721.42	725.67	740.21	851.81
DUP	Lynn McClurg	4.41%	252	334.62	661.37	678.9	834.1
Alliance	Robert Logan	11.12%	636	641.94	644.69	655.94	726.74
UUP	Carolyn Howarth	3.25%	186	196.8	200.3		
Electorate: 10,494 Valid: 5,717 (54.48%) Spoilt: 121 Quota: 817 Turnout: 5,838 (55.63%)

=== Knockagh Monument ===
2001: 2 x DUP, 2 x UUP, 2 x Alliance
2005: 3 x DUP, 2 x UUP, 1 x Alliance
2001-2005 Change: DUP gain from Alliance

Knockagh Monument - 6 seats
Party	Candidate	FPv%	Count						
Party	Candidate	FPv%	1	2	3	4	5	6	7
DUP	May Beattie*	33.20%	1,718						
UUP	Roy Beggs Jr*	19.46%	1,007						
Alliance	Stewart Dickson*	15.17%	785						
DUP	Louise Marsden	4.14%	214	926.82					
DUP	James McClurg*	8.56%	443	571.18	594.7	770.05			
UUP	Mark Cosgrove	4.89%	253	300.56	456.24	458.49	461.19	637.85	729.17
Alliance	Shireen Bell	5.72%	296	330.8	352.92	353.52	390.78	406.96	453.98
Independent	Robert Rice	5.66%	293	311.56	317.72	318.77	320.75	330.45	
UUP	Jackie Glover	3.19%	165	194	249.44	250.64	252.26		
Electorate: 9,540 Valid: 5,174 (54.23%) Spoilt: 111 Quota: 740 Turnout: 5,285 (55.40%)
