= 2001 Carrickfergus Borough Council election =

Local government election in Northern Ireland

← 1997	7 June 2001	2005 →

All 17 seats to Carrickfergus Borough Council 9 seats needed for a majority
	First party	Second party	Third party
Party	DUP	Alliance	UUP
Seats won	6	5	4
Seat change	▲3	0	0
	Fourth party	Fifth party
Party	Independent	Ind. Unionist
Seats won	2	0
Seat change	0	▼3
- Party with the most votes by district.

Elections to Carrickfergus Borough Council were held on 7 June 2001 on the same day as the other Northern Irish local government elections. The election used three district electoral areas to elect a total of 17 councillors.

== Election results ==
Carrickfergus Borough Council Election Result 2001
Party	Seats	Gains	Losses	Net gain/loss	Seats %	Votes %	Votes	+/−
DUP	6	3	0	▲3	35.3	31.8	4,905	▲11.8
Alliance	5	0	0	0	29.4	23.5	3,629	▼3.9
UUP	4	0	0	0	23.5	24.2	3,728	▲2.6
Independent	2	1	1	0	11.8	17.7	2,734	▼11.0
PUP	0	0	0	0	0.0	2.8	425	▼2.4

Note: "Votes" are the first preference votes.

== Districts summary ==
Results of the Carrickfergus Borough Council election, 2001 by district
Ward	%	Cllrs	%	Cllrs	%	Cllrs	%	Cllrs	Total Cllrs
Ward	DUP		Alliance		UUP		Others		Total Cllrs
Carrick Castle	31.4	2	21.6	1	12.1	1	34.9	1	5
Kilroot	30.0	2	24.1	2	17.7	1	28.2	1	6
Knockagh Monument	34.0	2	24.2	2	38.9	2	2.9	0	6
Total	31.8	6	23.5	5	24.2	4	20.5	2	17

== Districts results ==
=== Carrick Castle ===
1997: 2 x Independent, 1 x Alliance, 1 x DUP, 1 x UUP
2001: 2 x DUP, 1 x Alliance, 1 x UUP, 1 x Independent
1997-2001 Change: DUP gain from Independent

Carrick Castle - 5 seats
Party	Candidate	FPv%	Count					
Party	Candidate	FPv%	1	2	3	4	5	6
DUP	David Hilditch*	27.80%	996					
Alliance	Sean Neeson*	18.48%	662					
Independent	William Hamilton*	15.41%	552	581.93	588.23	604.23		
UUP	Darin Ferguson	12.14%	435	448.53	456.13	487.83	528.87	589.03
DUP	Patricia McKinney	3.63%	130	443.65	446.55	451.36	465.81	530.6
Independent	William Cameron	8.46%	303	315.3	316.6	322.6	337.95	388.4
PUP	David Beck	7.23%	259	271.3	273.1	277.9	298.05	
Independent	Nicholas Wady*	3.74%	134	146.3	153.8	192.4		
Alliance	Margaret Hawkins	3.13%	112	113.64	148.04			
Electorate: 6,542 Valid: 3,583 (54.77%) Spoilt: 92 Quota: 598 Turnout: 3,675 (56.18%)

=== Kilroot ===
1997: 2 x Alliance, 2 x Independent Unionist, 1 x UUP, 1 x DUP
2001: 2 x Alliance, 2 x DUP, 1 x UUP, 1 x Independent
1997-2001 Change: DUP gain from Independent Unionist, Independent Unionist becomes Independent

Kilroot - 6 seats
Party	Candidate	FPv%	Count			
Party	Candidate	FPv%	1	2	3	4
DUP	Billy Ashe*	23.04%	1,425			
Independent	James Brown*	20.62%	1,275			
UUP	Eric Ferguson*	17.67%	1,093			
DUP	Terence Clements	6.95%	430	918.28		
Alliance	Brenda Crampsey*	13.05%	807	814.8	911.6	
Alliance	Robert Cavan*	11.06%	684	699.6	776.16	875.63
Independent	Samuel Crowe*	7.60%	470	489.89	706.81	811.5
Electorate: 10,903 Valid: 6,184 (56.72%) Spoilt: 145 Quota: 884 Turnout: 6,329 (58.05%)

=== Knockagh Monument ===
1997: 2 x UUP, 2 x Alliance, 1 x DUP, 1 x Independent Unionist
2001: 2 x UUP, 2 x Alliance, 2 x DUP
1997-2001 Change: DUP gain from Independent Unionist

Knockagh Monument - 6 seats
Party	Candidate	FPv%	Count					
Party	Candidate	FPv%	1	2	3	4	5	6
UUP	Roy Beggs Jr	27.87%	1,575					
DUP	May Beattie*	25.13%	1,420					
Alliance	Stewart Dickson*	20.62%	1,165					
UUP	Gwendoline Wilson	11.06%	625	1,203.88				
DUP	James McClurg	8.87%	501	598.2	1,168.78			
Alliance	Noreen McIlwrath*	3.52%	199	257.86	270.55	493.57	560.78	894.41
PUP	Carolyn Howarth	2.94%	166	194.08	212.88	300.9	422.63	439.13
Electorate: 9,812 Valid: 5,651 (57.59%) Spoilt: 139 Quota: 808 Turnout: 5,790 (59.01%)
