= 1993 Carrickfergus Borough Council election =

Local government election in Northern Ireland

← 1989	19 May 1993	1997 →

All 17 seats to Carrickfergus Borough Council 9 seats needed for a majority
	First party	Second party	Third party
Party	Alliance	UUP	DUP
Seats won	6	5	2
Seat change	▲2	▲1	▼1
	Fourth party	Fifth party	Sixth party
Party	Ind. Unionist	NI Conservatives	Independent
Seats won	2	1	1
Seat change	▼1	▲1	▲1
	Seventh party
Party	PUP
Seats won	0
Seat change	▼1
- Party with the most votes by district.

Elections to Carrickfergus Borough Council were held on 19 May 1993 on the same day as the other Northern Irish local government elections. The election used three district electoral areas to elect a total of 17 councillors.

== Election results ==
Carrickfergus Borough Council Election Result 1993
Party	Seats	Gains	Losses	Net gain/loss	Seats %	Votes %	Votes	+/−
Alliance	6	2	0	▲2	35.3	32.2	3,520	▲5.1
UUP	5	1	0	▲1	29.4	24.0	2,628	▼4.7
DUP	2	0	1	▼1	11.8	18.5	2,024	▲2.1
Ind. Unionist	2	0	1	▼1	11.8	8.1	881	▼4.5
NI Conservatives	1	1	0	▲1	5.9	7.1	776	New
Independent	1	1	0	▲1	5.9	5.3	580	▲3.6
Independent Labour	0	0	0	0	0.0	3.2	352	▲3.2
PUP	0	0	1	▼1	0.0	1.7	183	▼2.9

Note: "Votes" are the first preference votes.

== Districts summary ==
Results of the Carrickfergus Borough Council election, 1993 by district
Ward	%	Cllrs	%	Cllrs	%	Cllrs	%	Cllrs	%	Cllrs	Total Cllrs
Ward	Alliance		UUP		DUP		Conservative		Others		Total Cllrs
Carrick Castle	38.9	2	13.3	1	22.8	1	0.0	0	25.0	1	5
Kilroot	29.3	2	26.8	2	13.0	0	13.3	1	17.6	1	6
Knockagh Monument	29.8	2	29.7	2	21.2	1	5.8	0	13.5	1	6
Total	32.2	6	24.0	5	18.5	2	7.1	1	18.2	3	17

== Districts results ==
=== Carrick Castle ===
1989: 2 x Alliance, 1 x DUP, 1 x UUP, 1 x PUP
1993: 2 x Alliance, 1 x DUP, 1 x UUP, 1 x Independent
1989-1993 Change: Independent gain from PUP

Carrick Castle - 5 seats
Party	Candidate	FPv%	Count				
Party	Candidate	FPv%	1	2	3	4	5
Alliance	Sean Neeson*	35.91%	1,096				
DUP	David Hilditch	22.80%	696				
Independent	William Hamilton	19.00%	580				
Alliance	Arthur McQuitty*	3.01%	92	532.73			
UUP	Samuel McCamley*	7.57%	231	267.58	358.93	379.09	556.58
PUP	Samuel Stewart*	6.00%	183	243.18	292.88	327.44	351.69
UUP	Robert McCartney	5.70%	174	218.25	259.55	274.67	
Electorate: 6,731 Valid: 3,052 (45.34%) Spoilt: 67 Quota: 510 Turnout: 3,119 (46.34%)

=== Kilroot ===
1989: 2 x UUP, 1 x Alliance, 1 x DUP, 1 x Independent Unionist
1993: 2 x Alliance, 2 x UUP, 1 x Conservative, 1 x Independent Unionist
1989-1993 Change: Alliance and Conservative gain from DUP and due to the addition of one seat

Kilroot - 6 seats
Party	Candidate	FPv%	Count								
Party	Candidate	FPv%	1	2	3	4	5	6	7	8	9
Alliance	Brenda Crampsey*	20.13%	850								
Alliance	William Donaldson	9.21%	389	568.22	568.51	573.83	579.7	589.44	591.44	625.44	
Ind. Unionist	Robert Patton*	9.21%	389	400.02	403.31	416.63	427.21	442.5	454.4	588.69	603.69
UUP	James Brown*	12.34%	521	523.9	532.19	535.19	552.19	555.19	560.19	574.19	574.19
NI Conservatives	Samuel Crowe	10.90%	460	469.57	470.57	530.15	533.73	540.73	546.73	559.02	562.02
UUP	Alexander Beggs*	10.97%	463	471.7	490.99	494.86	550.02	572.31	579.31	593.31	593.31
DUP	William Cross*	9.55%	403	406.19	409.19	412.19	419.19	425.19	535.19	547.48	547.48
Independent Labour	Norman Dixon	5.42%	229	234.22	234.22	236.22	237.22	298.67	299.67		
DUP	Eric Higgins	3.43%	145	145.58	146.58	147.58	149.58	151.58			
Independent Labour	William Venables	2.91%	123	128.51	135.51	137.8	142.09				
UUP	Ronald Mowat	2.20%	93	96.48	109.77	120.93					
NI Conservatives	Robert Wilson	2.39%	101	109.41	109.7						
UUP	Eric Ferguson	1.33%	56	57.74							
Electorate: 9,306 Valid: 4,222 (45.37%) Spoilt: 109 Quota: 605 Turnout: 4,331 (46.54%)

=== Knockagh Monument ===
1989: 2 x Independent Unionist, 1 x Alliance, 1 x UUP, 1 x DUP
1993: 2 x Alliance, 2 x UUP, 1 x DUP, 1 x Independent Unionist
1989-1993 Change: Alliance and UUP gain from Independent Unionist and due to the addition of one seat

Knockagh Monument - 6 seats
Party	Candidate	FPv%	Count					
Party	Candidate	FPv%	1	2	3	4	5	6
Alliance	Stewart Dickson*	25.80%	947					
UUP	David Apsley	18.64%	684					
Ind. Unionist	Charles Johnston*	13.41%	492	549.04				
UUP	Joseph Reid*	6.29%	231	242.96	277.69	286.07	324.22	535.59
Alliance	Noreen McIlwrath	3.98%	146	463.4	465.01	470.93	507.3	521.74
DUP	William Haggan*	11.42%	419	426.82	437.4	438.63	451.78	475.08
DUP	May Beattie	9.84%	361	366.52	383.77	386.77	397.15	407.22
UUP	Mary McFall	4.77%	175	183.74	264.01	268.47	299	
NI Conservatives	Nicola Eakin	3.30%	121	129.28	134.34	203.72		
NI Conservatives	Charles Moffett	2.56%	94	98.14	100.44			
Electorate: 8,859 Valid: 3,670 (41.43%) Spoilt: 96 Quota: 526 Turnout: 3,766 (42.51%)
