= Committee for Communities =

North Irish government entity

The Committee for Communities is a Northern Ireland Assembly committee established to advise, assist and scrutinise the work of the Department for Communities and Minister for Communities (currently Gordon Lyons). The committee also plays a key role in the consultation, consideration and development of new social development legislation.

Until 2016, the committee was called the Committee for Social Development.

== Membership ==
Membership of the committee is as follows:

Party	Member	Constituency
Sinn Féin	Colm Gildernew MLA (Chairperson)	Fermanagh and South Tyrone
Sinn Féin	Nicola Brogan MLA (Deputy Chairperson)	West Tyrone
UUP	Andy Allen MLA	Belfast East
Alliance	Kellie Armstrong MLA	Strangford
DUP	Maurice Bradley MLA	East Londonderry
DUP	Pam Cameron MLA	South Antrim
SDLP	Mark H. Durkan MLA	Foyle
Sinn Féin	Maolíosa McHugh MLA	West Tyrone
Alliance	Sian Mulholland MLA	North Antrim

== 2022–2027 Assembly ==
Party	Member	Constituency
Sinn Féin	Colm Gildernew MLA (Chairperson)	Fermanagh and South Tyrone
Sinn Féin	Ciara Ferguson MLA (Deputy Chairperson)	Foyle
UUP	Andy Allen MLA	Belfast East
Alliance	Kellie Armstrong MLA	Strangford
DUP	Maurice Bradley MLA	East Londonderry
DUP	Brian Kingston MLA	Belfast North
SDLP	Daniel McCrossan MLA	West Tyrone
Sinn Féin	Maolíosa McHugh MLA	West Tyrone
Alliance	Sian Mulholland MLA	North Antrim

=== Changes 2022–2027 ===
Date	Outgoing member and party	Constituency	→	New member and party	Constituency
6 February 2025	Ciara Ferguson MLA (Deputy Chairperson, Sinn Féin)	Foyle	→	Nicola Brogan MLA (Deputy Chairperson, Sinn Féin)	West Tyrone
8 September 2025	Daniel McCrossan MLA (SDLP)	West Tyrone	→	Mark H. Durkan MLA (SDLP)	Foyle
23 September 2025	Brian Kingston MLA (DUP)	Belfast North	→	Pam Cameron MLA (DUP)	South Antrim

== 2017-2022 Assembly ==
The committee met for the first time in the 2017-2022 Assembly on 23 January 2020.

Party	Member	Constituency
DUP	Paula Bradley MLA (Chairperson)	Belfast North
Alliance	Kellie Armstrong MLA (Deputy Chairperson)	Strangford
UUP	Andy Allen MLA	Belfast East
DUP	Jonathan Buckley MLA	Upper Bann
SDLP	Mark H. Durkan MLA	Foyle
Sinn Féin	Sinéad Ennis MLA	South Down
DUP	Robin Newton MLA	Belfast East
Sinn Féin	Carál Ní Chuilín MLA	Belfast North
Sinn Féin	Emma Sheerin MLA	Mid Ulster

=== Changes 2017-2022 ===
Date	Outgoing member and party	Constituency	→	New member and party	Constituency
9 March 2020	Emma Sheerin MLA (Sinn Féin)	Mid Ulster	→	Fra McCann MLA (Sinn Féin)	Belfast West
17 June 2020	Carál Ní Chuilín MLA (Sinn Féin)	Belfast North	→	Vacant	
2 November 2020	Jonathan Buckley MLA (DUP)	Upper Bann	→	Alex Easton MLA (DUP)	North Down
16 December 2020	Vacant		→	Carál Ní Chuilín MLA (Sinn Féin)	Belfast North
1 February 2021	Carál Ní Chuilín MLA (Sinn Féin)	Belfast North	→	Karen Mullan MLA (Sinn Féin)	Foyle
21 June 2021	Robin Newton MLA (DUP)	Belfast East	→	Pam Cameron MLA (DUP)	South Antrim
15 September 2021	Sinéad Ennis MLA (Sinn Féin)	South Down	→	Áine Murphy MLA (Sinn Féin)	Fermanagh and South Tyrone
20 September 2021	Pam Cameron MLA (DUP)	South Antrim	→	Stephen Dunne MLA (DUP)	North Down
20 September 2021	Alex Easton MLA (DUP)	North Down	→	Paul Frew MLA (DUP)	North Antrim
27 September 2021	Karen Mullan MLA (Sinn Féin)	Foyle	→	Ciara Ferguson MLA (Sinn Féin)	Foyle
1 November 2021	Fra McCann MLA (Sinn Féin)	Belfast West	→	Aisling Reilly MLA (Sinn Féin)	Belfast West

== 2016-2017 Assembly ==
The committee met for the first time in the 2016-2017 Assembly on 2 June 2016.

Party	Member	Constituency
SDLP	Colum Eastwood MLA (Chairperson)	Foyle
Sinn Féin	Michelle Gildernew MLA (Deputy Chairperson)	Fermanagh and South Tyrone
Green (NI)	Steven Agnew MLA	North Down
UUP	Andy Allen MLA	Belfast East
DUP	Jonathan Bell MLA	Strangford
Alliance	Naomi Long MLA	Belfast East
Sinn Féin	Fra McCann MLA	Belfast West
DUP	Adrian McQuillan MLA	East Londonderry
SDLP	Nichola Mallon MLA	Belfast North
Sinn Féin	Carál Ní Chuilín MLA	Belfast North
DUP	Christopher Stalford MLA	Belfast South

=== Changes 2016-2017 ===
None

== 2011-2016 Assembly ==
The committee met for the first time in the 2011-2016 Assembly in May 2011.

Party	Member	Constituency
Sinn Féin	Alex Maskey MLA (Chairperson)	Belfast South
Sinn Féin	Mickey Brady MLA (Deputy Chairperson)	Newry and Armagh
DUP	Gregory Campbell MLA	East Londonderry
Alliance	Judith Cochrane MLA	Belfast East
UUP	Michael Copeland MLA	Belfast East
DUP	Pam Cameron MLA	South Antrim
DUP	Sammy Douglas MLA	Belfast East
SDLP	Mark H. Durkan MLA	Foyle
DUP	Alex Easton MLA	North Down
Sinn Féin	Fra McCann MLA	Belfast West
Ind. Unionist	David McClarty MLA	East Londonderry

=== Changes 2011-2016 ===
Date	Outgoing member and party	Constituency	→	New member and party	Constituency
20 February 2012	Gregory Campbell MLA (DUP)	East Londonderry	→	Paula Bradley MLA (DUP)	Belfast North
26 March 2012	Sammy Douglas MLA (DUP)	Belfast East	→	Alastair Ross MLA (DUP)	East Antrim
1 October 2012	Alex Easton MLA (DUP)	North Down	→	Gregory Campbell MLA (DUP)	East Londonderry
1 October 2012	Alastair Ross MLA (DUP)	East Antrim	→	Sammy Douglas MLA (DUP)	Belfast East
11 February 2013	Sammy Douglas MLA (DUP)	Belfast East	→	Sydney Anderson MLA (DUP)	Upper Bann
7 May 2013	Sydney Anderson MLA (DUP)	Upper Bann	→	Sammy Douglas MLA (DUP)	Belfast East
9 September 2013	David McClarty MLA (Ind. Unionist)	East Londonderry	→	Jim Allister MLA (TUV)	North Antrim
16 September 2013	Pam Cameron MLA (DUP)	South Antrim	→	Trevor Clarke MLA (DUP)	South Antrim
16 September 2013	Sammy Douglas MLA (DUP)	Belfast East	→	Sammy Wilson MLA (DUP)	East Antrim
30 September 2013	Mark H. Durkan MLA (SDLP)	Foyle	→	Dolores Kelly MLA (SDLP)	Upper Bann
1 October 2013	Judith Cochrane MLA (Alliance)	Belfast East	→	Stewart Dickson MLA (Alliance)	East Antrim
6 October 2014	Trevor Clarke MLA (DUP)	South Antrim	→	Sammy Douglas MLA (DUP)	Belfast East
17 November 2014	Sammy Douglas MLA (DUP)	Belfast East	→	Maurice Devenney MLA (DUP)	Foyle
9 February 2015	Michael Copeland MLA (UUP)	Belfast East	→	Roy Beggs Jr MLA (UUP)	East Antrim
25 March 2015	Maurice Devenney MLA (DUP)	Foyle	→	Vacant	
22 April 2015	Vacant		→	Gary Middleton MLA (DUP)	Foyle
19 May 2015	Gary Middleton MLA (DUP)	Foyle	→	Sammy Douglas MLA (DUP)	Belfast East
8 September 2015	Mickey Brady MLA (Deputy Chairperson, Sinn Féin)	Newry and Armagh	→	Fra McCann MLA (Deputy Chairperson, Sinn Féin)	Belfast West
29 July 2015	Sammy Wilson MLA (DUP)	East Antrim	→	Vacant	
7 September 2015	Vacant		→	Gordon Lyons MLA (DUP)	East Antrim
14 September 2015	Fra McCann MLA (Sinn Féin)	Belfast West	→	Phil Flanagan MLA (Sinn Féin)	Fermanagh and South Tyrone
5 October 2015	Gordon Lyons MLA (DUP)	East Antrim	→	Adrian McQuillan MLA (DUP)	East Londonderry

== 2007-2011 Assembly ==
The committee met for the first time in the 2007-2011 Assembly in May 2007.

Party	Member	Constituency
DUP	Gregory Campbell MLA (Chairperson)	East Londonderry
DUP	David Hilditch MLA (Deputy Chairperson)	East Antrim
Sinn Féin	Mickey Brady MLA	Newry and Armagh
SDLP	Thomas Burns MLA	South Antrim
UUP	Fred Cobain MLA	Belfast North
DUP	Jonathan Craig MLA	Lagan Valley
Alliance	Anna Lo MLA	Belfast South
SDLP	Alban Maginness MLA	Belfast North
Sinn Féin	Fra McCann MLA	Belfast West
Sinn Féin	Claire McGill MLA	West Tyrone
DUP	Michelle McIlveen MLA	Strangford

=== Changes 2007-2011 ===
Date	Outgoing member and party	Constituency	→	New member and party	Constituency
20 May 2008	Claire McGill MLA (Sinn Féin)	West Tyrone	→	Carál Ní Chuilín MLA (Sinn Féin)	Belfast North
9 June 2008	Gregory Campbell MLA (Chairperson, DUP)	East Londonderry	→	David Simpson MLA (Chairperson, DUP)	Upper Bann
29 September 2008	Fred Cobain MLA (UUP)	Belfast North	→	Billy Armstrong MLA (UUP)	Mid Ulster
29 June 2009	Alban Maginness MLA (SDLP)	Belfast North	→	Mary Bradley MLA (SDLP)	Foyle
4 July 2009	Simon Hamilton MLA (Chairperson, DUP)	Strangford	→	David Simpson MLA (Chairperson, DUP)	Upper Bann
14 September 2009	Michelle McIlveen MLA (DUP)	Strangford	→	Alex Easton MLA (DUP)	North Down
14 April 2010	David Hilditch MLA (Deputy Chairperson, DUP)	East Antrim	→	Carál Ní Chuilín MLA (Deputy Chairperson, Sinn Féin)	Belfast North
25 May 2010	Thomas Burns MLA (SDLP)	South Antrim	→	Tommy Gallagher MLA (SDLP)	Fermanagh and South Tyrone
14 September 2010	David Hilditch MLA (DUP)	East Antrim	→	Sydney Anderson MLA (DUP)	Upper Bann
2 November 2010	Billy Armstrong MLA (UUP)	Mid Ulster	→	John McCallister MLA (UUP)	South Down
8 February 2011	John McCallister MLA (UUP)	South Down	→	Fred Cobain MLA (UUP)	Belfast North

== 1998-2003 Assembly ==
The committee met for the first time in the 1998-2003 Assembly in December 1999.

Party	Member	Constituency
UUP	Fred Cobain MLA (Chairperson)	Belfast North
Sinn Féin	Michelle Gildernew MLA	Fermanagh and South Tyrone
UUP	John Gorman MLA	North Down
PUP	Billy Hutchinson MLA	Belfast North
UUP	David McClarty MLA	East Londonderry
SDLP	Danny O'Connor MLA	East Antrim
SDLP	Eamonn O'Neill MLA	South Down
DUP	Mark Robinson MLA	Belfast South
SDLP	John Tierney MLA	Foyle
DUP	Sammy Wilson MLA	Belfast East

=== Changes 1998-2003 ===
Date	Outgoing member and party	Constituency	→	New member and party	Constituency
1 March 2001	David McClarty MLA (UUP)	East Londonderry	→	Tom Hamilton MLA (UUP)	Strangford
1 July 2002	Michelle Gildernew MLA (Sinn Féin)	Fermanagh and South Tyrone	→	Mary Nelis MLA (Sinn Féin)	Foyle
8 April 2002	Vacant		→	Gerry Kelly MLA (Deputy Chairperson, Sinn Féin)	Belfast North

== See also ==
- Committee
