= 1997 Carrickfergus Borough Council election =

Local government election in Northern Ireland

← 1993	21 May 1997	2001 →

All 17 seats to Carrickfergus Borough Council 9 seats needed for a majority
	First party	Second party	Third party
Party	Alliance	UUP	DUP
Seats won	5	4	3
Seat change	▼1	▼1	▲1
	Fourth party	Fifth party	Sixth party
Party	Ind. Unionist	Independent	NI Conservatives
Seats won	3	2	0
Seat change	▲1	▲1	▼1
- Results by district electoral area, shaded by First Preference Votes.

Elections to Carrickfergus Borough Council were held on 21 May 1997 on the same day as the other Northern Irish local government elections. The election used three district electoral areas to elect a total of 17 councillors.

== Election results ==
Carrickfergus Borough Council Election Result 1997
Party	Seats	Gains	Losses	Net gain/loss	Seats %	Votes %	Votes	+/−
Alliance	5	0	1	▼3	29.4	27.4	3,520	▼4.8
UUP	4	0	1	▼1	23.5	21.6	2,330	▼2.4
DUP	3	1	0	▲1	17.6	20.0	2,160	▲1.5
Ind. Unionist	3	1	0	▲1	17.6	17.8	1,918	▲9.7
Independent	2	1	0	▲1	11.8	7.9	854	▼0.6
PUP	0	0	0	0	0.0	5.2	565	▲3.5

Note: "Votes" are the first preference votes.

== Districts summary ==
Results of the Carrickfergus Borough Council election, 1997 by district
Ward	%	Cllrs	%	Cllrs	%	Cllrs	%	Cllrs	Total Cllrs
Ward	Alliance		UUP		DUP		Others		Total Cllrs
Carrick Castle	28.8	1	16.9	1	22.7	1	31.6	2	5
Kilroot	25.5	2	17.2	1	14.5	1	42.8	2	6
Knockagh Monument	28.6	2	30.0	2	24.3	1	17.1	1	6
Total	27.4	5	21.6	4	20.0	3	31.0	5	17

== Districts results ==
=== Carrick Castle ===
1993: 2 x Alliance, 1 x DUP, 1 x UUP, 1 x Independent
1997: 2 x Independent, 1 x Alliance, 1 x DUP, 1 x UUP
1993-1997 Change: Independent gain from Alliance

Carrick Castle - 5 seats
Party	Candidate	FPv%	Count					
Party	Candidate	FPv%	1	2	3	4	5	6
Alliance	Sean Neeson*	26.87%	741					
DUP	David Hilditch*	22.70%	626					
Independent	William Hamilton*	17.91%	494					
UUP	Samuel McCamley*	16.90%	466					
Independent	Nicholas Wady	8.45%	233	266.18	305.13	320.13	320.79	398.87
Alliance	Arthur McQuitty*	1.96%	54	274.92	291.32	294.12	294.97	332.75
PUP	Samuel Stewart	5.22%	144	169.2	277.44	291.44	293.09	
Electorate: 6,744 Valid: 2,758 (40.90%) Spoilt: 56 Quota: 460 Turnout: 2,814 (41.73%)

=== Kilroot ===
1993: 2 x Alliance, 2 x UUP, 1 x Conservative, 1 x Independent Unionist
1997: 2 x Alliance, 2 x Independent Unionist, 1 x UUP, 1 x DUP
1993-1997 Change: DUP gain from Independent Unionist, Independent Unionists leave UUP and Conservatives

Kilroot - 6 seats
Party	Candidate	FPv%	Count						
Party	Candidate	FPv%	1	2	3	4	5	6	7
Ind. Unionist	James Brown*	21.31%	908						
Ind. Unionist	Samuel Crowe*	12.98%	553	633.28					
Alliance	Brenda Crampsey*	13.00%	554	571.64	593.36	595.76	613.76		
DUP	Billy Ashe	8.38%	357	392.28	402.64	404.08	462.96	679.96	
Alliance	Robert Cavan	12.46%	531	553.68	570.76	572.8	590	605.8	608.92
UUP	Eric Ferguson	8.71%	371	418.52	428.68	435.76	482.64	511.64	547
UUP	Colin McAuley	8.50%	362	389	404.16	407.76	445	482.16	513.88
DUP	Desmond Robinson	6.13%	261	286.92	298.36	301.72	351.24		
PUP	Billy Donaldson	5.56%	237	258.96	284.12	287.12			
Independent	Norman Dixon	2.98%	127	139.96					
Electorate: 10,234 Valid: 4,261 (41.64%) Spoilt: 56 Quota: 609 Turnout: 4,317 (42.18%)

=== Knockagh Monument ===
1993: 2 x UUP, 2 x Alliance, 1 x DUP, 1 x Independent Unionist
1997: 2 x UUP, 2 x Alliance, 1 x DUP, 1 x Independent Unionist
1993-1997 Change: No change

Knockagh Monument - 6 seats
Party	Candidate	FPv%	Count			
Party	Candidate	FPv%	1	2	3	4
Alliance	Stewart Dickson*	23.03%	867			
UUP	Thomas Creighton	20.03%	754			
DUP	May Beattie	15.41%	580			
UUP	Joseph Reid*	10.02%	377	392.99	544.95	
Ind. Unionist	Charles Johnston*	12.14%	457	486.25	507.71	552.71
Alliance	Noreen McIlwrath*	5.55%	209	479.66	488.36	514.45
DUP	William Haggan*	8.93%	336	342.63	364.96	425.38
PUP	Carolyn Howarth	4.89%	184	189.85	196.81	
Electorate: 9,549 Valid: 3,764 (39.42%) Spoilt: 65 Quota: 538 Turnout: 3,829 (40.10%)
