= 2011 Carrickfergus Borough Council election =

Local government election in Northern Ireland

- 5 May 2011

All 17 seats to Carrickfergus Borough Council 9 seats needed for a majority
	First party	Second party	Third party
Party	DUP	UUP	Alliance
Seats won	8	4	3
Seat change	Steady	Steady	Steady
	Fourth party
Party	Independent
Seats won	2
Seat change	Steady
- Party with the most votes by district.

Elections to Carrickfergus Borough Council were held on 5 May 2011 on the same day as the other Northern Irish local government elections. The election used three district electoral areas to elect a total of 17 councillors.

There was no change from the prior election.

== Election results ==
Carrickfergus Borough Council Election Result 2011
Party	Seats	Gains	Losses	Net gain/loss	Seats %	Votes %	Votes	+/−
DUP	8	0	0	Steady	47.1	43.2	5,356	▼0.1
UUP	4	0	0	Steady	23.5	15.9	1,972	▼2.1
Alliance	3	0	0	Steady	17.6	25.1	3,110	▲1.9
Independent	2	0	0	Steady	11.8	13.5	1,670	▼2.0
Green (NI)	0	0	0	Steady	0.0	2.4	294	▲2.4

Note: "Votes" are the first preference votes.

== Districts summary ==
Results of the Carrickfergus Borough Council election, 2011 by district
Ward	%	Cllrs	%	Cllrs	%	Cllrs	%	Cllrs	Total Cllrs
Ward	DUP		UUP		Alliance		Others		Total Cllrs
Carrick Castle	38.7	2	9.9	1	31.5	1	19.9	1	5
Kilroot	39.1	3	13.3	1	22.3	1	25.3	1	6
Knockagh Monument	50.3	3	22.1	2	24.9	1	2.7	0	6
Total	43.2	8	15.9	4	25.1	3	15.8	2	17

== Districts results ==
=== Carrick Castle ===
2005: 2 x DUP, 1 x Alliance, 1 x UUP, 1 x Independent
2011: 2 x DUP, 1 x Alliance, 1 x UUP, 1 x Independent
2005-2011 Change: No change

Carrick Castle - 5 seats
Party	Candidate	FPv%	Count						
Party	Candidate	FPv%	1	2	3	4	5	6	7
Alliance	Sean Neeson*	26.44%	651						
DUP	David Hilditch*	20.59%	507						
Independent	William Hamilton*	14.87%	366	391.08	400.01	448.01			
DUP	Deborah Emerson	10.56%	260	272.16	308.07	314.97	318.97	455.97	
UUP	Elizabeth McKnight	9.87%	243	262	266.37	283.7	286.7	316.52	355.4
Alliance	Noel Williams	5.04%	124	270.68	273.34	297.84	305.84	321.96	327.63
DUP	Patricia McKinney*	7.55%	186	198.92	237.68	250.34	260.34		
Independent	Nicholas Wady	5.08%	125	145.14	147.61				
Electorate: 5,761 Valid: 2,462 (42.74%) Spoilt: 51 Quota: 411 Turnout: 2,513 (43.62%)

=== Kilroot ===
2005: 3 x DUP, 1 x Alliance, 1 x UUP, 1 x Independent
2011: 3 x DUP, 1 x Alliance, 1 x UUP, 1 x Independent
2005-2011 Change: No change

Kilroot - 6 seats
Party	Candidate	FPv%	Count					
Party	Candidate	FPv%	1	2	3	4	5	6
Independent	James Brown*	22.17%	1,179					
DUP	Billy Ashe*	22.06%	1,173					
DUP	Terence Clements*	9.68%	515	631.4	909.32			
Alliance	Isobel Day*	12.99%	691	753.8	762.08			
DUP	Lynn McClurg*	7.35%	391	456.2	545.84	558.6	688.94	744.77
UUP	Eric Ferguson*	6.75%	359	428.6	443.36	455.64	464.57	726.59
Alliance	Robert Logan	9.27%	493	521.8	525.04	626.04	628.13	672.21
UUP	Cathy Vizard	6.54%	348	402.4	413.92	425.56	426.51	
Green (NI)	Mark Bailey	3.18%	169	186.2	191.96			
Electorate: 11,430 Valid: 5,318 (46.53%) Spoilt: 78 Quota: 760 Turnout: 5,396 (47.21%)

=== Knockagh Monument ===
2005: 3 x DUP, 2 x UUP, 1 x Alliance
2011: 3 x DUP, 2 x UUP, 1 x Alliance
2005-2011 Change: No change

Knockagh Monument - 6 seats
Party	Candidate	FPv%	Count						
Party	Candidate	FPv%	1	2	3	4	5	6	7
DUP	May Beattie*	23.47%	1,085						
Alliance	Stewart Dickson*	18.07%	835						
DUP	Charie Johnston	9.32%	431	677.8					
DUP	James McClurg*	12.12%	560	605.2	611.6	621.68	837.68		
UUP	Andrew Wilson	12.29%	568	581.2	586.2	594.81	615.26	651.26	654.71
UUP	John Stewart	9.82%	454	468.8	479.8	490.51	520.76	579.76	591.01
Alliance	Shireen Bell	6.84%	316	327.6	403.6	535.9	550.95	575.95	577.85
DUP	Louise Marsden*	5.37%	248	332.4	335.4	340.02			
Green (NI)	Brian Luney	2.70%	125	126.6					
Electorate: 10,090 Valid: 4,622 (45.81%) Spoilt: 81 Quota: 661 Turnout: 4,703 (46.61%)
