= 1989 Carrickfergus Borough Council election =

Local government election in Northern Ireland

| ← 1985 | 17 May 1989 | 1993 → |

All 15 seats to Carrickfergus Borough Council 8 seats needed for a majority
| | First party | Second party | Third party |
|---|---|---|---|
| Party | UUP | Alliance | DUP |
| Seats won | 4 | 4 | 3 |
| Seat change | ▼3 | ▲1 | 0 |
| | Fourth party | Fifth party |
| Party | Ind. Unionist | PUP |
| Seats won | 3 | 1 |
| Seat change | ▲2 | 0 |

Elections to Carrickfergus Borough Council were held on 17 May 1989 on the same day as the other Northern Irish local government elections. The election used three district electoral areas to elect a total of 15 councillors.

== Election results ==
Carrickfergus Borough Council Election Result 1989
| Party | Seats | Gains | Losses | Net gain/loss | Seats % | Votes % | Votes | +/− |
|---|---|---|---|---|---|---|---|---|
| UUP | 4 | 0 | 3 | ▼3 | 26.7 | 28.7 | 2,956 | ▼5.0 |
| Alliance | 4 | 1 | 0 | ▲1 | 26.7 | 27.1 | 2,793 | ▲2.2 |
| DUP | 3 | 0 | 0 | 0 | 20.0 | 16.4 | 1,694 | ▼10.6 |
| Ind. Unionist | 3 | 2 | 0 | ▲2 | 20.0 | 12.6 | 1,296 | ▲3.4 |
| PUP | 1 | 0 | 0 | 0 | 0.0 | 4.6 | 472 | ▲1.6 |
| Protestant Unionist | 0 | 0 | 0 | 0 | 0.0 | 4.6 | 471 | New |
| Independent | 0 | 0 | 0 | 0 | 0.0 | 1.7 | 171 | ▲1.7 |

Note: "Votes" are the first preference votes.

== Districts summary ==
Results of the Carrickfergus Borough Council election, 1989 by district
| Ward | % | Cllrs | % | Cllrs | % | Cllrs | % | Cllrs | % | Cllrs | Total Cllrs |
| Ward | UUP | | Alliance | | DUP | | PUP | | Others | | Total Cllrs |
|---|---|---|---|---|---|---|---|---|---|---|---|
| Carrick Castle | 18.9 | 1 | 35.5 | 2 | 15.4 | 1 | 15.1 | 1 | 15.1 | 0 | 5 |
| Kilroot | 42.1 | 2 | 25.3 | 1 | 14.5 | 1 | 0.0 | 0 | 18.1 | 1 | 5 |
| Knockagh Monument | 23.4 | 1 | 21.9 | 1 | 19.2 | 1 | 0.0 | 0 | 35.5 | 2 | 5 |
| Total | 28.7 | 4 | 27.1 | 4 | 16.4 | 3 | 4.6 | 1 | 23.2 | 3 | 15 |

== Districts results ==
=== Carrick Castle ===
1985: 2 x UUP, 1 x Alliance, 1 x DUP, 1 x PUP
1989: 2 x Alliance, 1 x DUP, 1 x UUP, 1 x PUP
1985-1989 Change: Alliance gain from UUP

Carrick Castle - 5 seats
| Party | Candidate | FPv% | Count | | | | | |
| Party | Candidate | FPv% | 1 | 2 | 3 | 4 | 5 | 6 |
|---|---|---|---|---|---|---|---|---|
| Alliance | Sean Neeson* | 32.91% | 1,029 | | | | | |
| PUP | Samuel Stewart* | 15.09% | 472 | 531.16 | | | | |
| UUP | Samuel McCamley* | 9.18% | 287 | 320.15 | 362.72 | 381.29 | 398.88 | 567.88 |
| DUP | Andrew Blair | 9.31% | 291 | 298.65 | 301.16 | 444.69 | 458.22 | 492.79 |
| Alliance | Arthur McQuitty | 2.59% | 81 | 369.66 | 375.72 | 376.72 | 458.75 | 476.93 |
| Protestant Unionist | David Hilditch | 9.66% | 302 | 315.77 | 325.83 | 339.34 | 353.87 | 383.4 |
| UUP | Robert English* | 7.29% | 228 | 245.85 | 263.91 | 275.91 | 290.48 | |
| Independent | Patrick Lennox | 5.47% | 171 | 222 | 225.51 | 226.51 | | |
| UUP | Margaret Cross | 6.08% | 190 | 199.69 | 203.2 | | | |
| UUP | Sarah Picken | 2.43% | 76 | 93.34 | | | | |
Electorate: 6,840 Valid: 3,127 (45.72%) Spoilt: 54 Quota: 522 Turnout: 3,181 (46.51%)

=== Kilroot ===
1985: 3 x UUP, 1 x Alliance, 1 x DUP
1989: 2 x UUP, 1 x Alliance, 1 x DUP, 1 x Independent Unionist
1985-1989 Change: Independent Unionist leaves UUP

Kilroot - 5 seats
| Party | Candidate | FPv% | Count | | | | | |
| Party | Candidate | FPv% | 1 | 2 | 3 | 4 | 5 | 6 |
|---|---|---|---|---|---|---|---|---|
| UUP | Alexander Beggs | 20.05% | 739 | | | | | |
| Alliance | Brenda Crampsey* | 19.51% | 719 | | | | | |
| Ind. Unionist | Robert Patton* | 18.13% | 668 | | | | | |
| UUP | James Brown* | 16.26% | 599 | 668.02 | | | | |
| DUP | William Cross* | 14.52% | 535 | 545.37 | 547.92 | 558 | 574.11 | 660.11 |
| Alliance | David McCann | 5.78% | 213 | 216.74 | 309.89 | 310.87 | 327.16 | 383.59 |
| UUP | Eric Ferguson | 5.75% | 212 | 250.59 | 257.49 | 298.37 | 314.84 | |
Electorate: 7,981 Valid: 3,685 (46.17%) Spoilt: 84 Quota: 615 Turnout: 3,769 (47.22%)

=== Knockagh Monument ===
1985: 2 x UUP, 1 x Alliance, 1 x DUP, 1 x Independent Unionist
1989: 2 x Independent Unionist, 1 x UUP, 1 x UUP, 1 x DUP
1985-1989 Change: Independent Unionist leaves UUP

Knockagh Monument - 5 seats
| Party | Candidate | FPv% | Count | | | | | |
| Party | Candidate | FPv% | 1 | 2 | 3 | 4 | 5 | 6 |
|---|---|---|---|---|---|---|---|---|
| DUP | William Haggan* | 19.22% | 668 | | | | | |
| Alliance | Stewart Dickson* | 18.70% | 650 | | | | | |
| Ind. Unionist | Charles Johnston* | 18.07% | 628 | | | | | |
| UUP | William Murray | 14.47% | 503 | 536.6 | 538.14 | 551.26 | 566.03 | 641.03 |
| Ind. Unionist | Mary Ardill* | 12.51% | 435 | 445.08 | 451.79 | 466.43 | 525.76 | 552.16 |
| UUP | Samuel Wilson* | 8.98% | 312 | 337.2 | 338.19 | 343.87 | 356.28 | 402.5 |
| Protestant Unionist | John Everitt | 4.86% | 169 | 183.98 | 184.31 | 189.03 | 194.74 | |
| Alliance | Noreen McIlwrath | 3.19% | 111 | 111.98 | 171.05 | 176.89 | | |
Electorate: 7,803 Valid: 3,476 (44.55%) Spoilt: 73 Quota: 580 Turnout: 3,549 (45.48%)
