= 1985 Carrickfergus Borough Council election =

Local government election in Northern Ireland

← 1981	15 May 1985	1989 →

All 15 seats to Carrickfergus Borough Council 8 seats needed for a majority
	First party	Second party	Third party
Party	UUP	DUP	Alliance
Seats won	7	3	3
Seat change	▲4	▼4	0
	Fourth party	Fifth party	Sixth party
Party	Ind. Unionist	PUP	United Loyalist
Seats won	1	1	0
Seat change	0	▲1	▼1

Elections to Carrickfergus Borough Council were held on 15 May 1985 on the same day as the other Northern Irish local government elections. The election used three district electoral areas to elect a total of 15 councillors.

== Election results ==
Carrickfergus Borough Council Election Result 1985
Party	Seats	Gains	Losses	Net gain/loss	Seats %	Votes %	Votes	+/−
UUP	7	4	0	▲4	46.7	33.7	3,565	▲11.1
DUP	3	0	4	▼4	20.0	27.0	2,862	▼9.6
Alliance	3	0	0	0	20.0	24.9	2,634	▲3.1
Ind. Unionist	1	1	1	0	6.7	9.2	970	▲4.8
PUP	1	0	0	▲1	0.0	3.0	314	▲0.1
Ulster Democratic	0	0	0	0	0.0	2.3	246	New

Note: "Votes" are the first preference votes.

== Districts summary ==
Results of the Carrickfergus Borough Council election, 1985 by district
Ward	%	Cllrs	%	Cllrs	%	Cllrs	%	Cllrs	%	Cllrs	Total Cllrs
Ward	UUP		DUP		Alliance		PUP		Others		Total Cllrs
Carrick Castle	29.3	2	29.6	1	31.7	1	9.4	1	0.0	0	5
Kilroot	43.6	3	25.9	1	22.0	1	0.0	0	8.5	0	5
Knockagh Monument	27.5	2	25.8	1	21.4	1	0.0	0	25.3	1	5
Total	33.7	7	27.0	3	24.9	3	3.0	1	11.4	1	15

== District results ==
=== Carrick Castle ===
1985: 2 x UUP, 1 x Alliance, 1 x DUP, 1 x PUP

Carrick Castle - 5 seats
Party	Candidate	FPv%	Count							
Party	Candidate	FPv%	1	2	3	4	5	6	7	8
Alliance	Sean Neeson*	29.92%	1,005							
DUP	Victor Fleming	14.20%	477	488.7	503.7	582.7				
UUP	Samuel McCamley	12.89%	433	485.2	550.25	571.25				
UUP	Robert English	12.21%	410	430.7	477.85	500.15	582.25			
PUP	Samuel Stewart	9.35%	314	349.55	354.9	378.5	440.15	441.65	458.45	461.89
DUP	James Strange*	8.01%	269	283.85	295.3	411.15	422.6	443.3	448.34	456.08
Alliance	Owen Mulvenna	1.82%	61	331.9	333.35	334.8				
DUP	Gladys Service	7.35%	247	269.95	273.4					
UUP	James McBride	4.26%	143	153.35						
Electorate: 6,872 Valid: 3,359 (48.88%) Spoilt: 81 Quota: 560 Turnout: 3,440 (50.06%)

=== Kilroot ===
1985: 3 x UUP, 1 x Alliance, 1 x DUP

Kilroot - 5 seats
Party	Candidate	FPv%	Count					
Party	Candidate	FPv%	1	2	3	4	5	6
UUP	James Brown*	31.37%	1,146					
DUP	William Cross*	19.03%	695					
Alliance	Brenda Crampsey	16.84%	615					
UUP	Wesley Mitchell	5.56%	203	485.47	487.99	500.35	533.4	614.4
UUP	Robert Patton	6.68%	244	361.97	367.13	373.25	401.01	485.66
Ind. Unionist	Robert Hunter	8.49%	310	369.69	375.09	380.21	447.15	484.79
DUP	William Sloan	3.59%	131	157.32	218.16	328.43	337.32	
Alliance	Elma McMaster	5.15%	188	214.32	215.64	218.58		
DUP	Raymond Templeton	3.31%	121	137.45	143.69			
Electorate: 6,968 Valid: 3,653 (52.43%) Spoilt: 89 Quota: 609 Turnout: 3,742 (53.70%)

=== Knockagh Monument ===
1985: 2 x UUP, 1 x Alliance, 1 x DUP, 1 x Independent Unionist

Knockagh Monument - 5 seats
Party	Candidate	FPv%	Count						
Party	Candidate	FPv%	1	2	3	4	5	6	7
UUP	Mary Ardill*	20.56%	736						
Ind. Unionist	Charles Johnston*	18.44%	660						
Alliance	Stewart Dickson	14.61%	523	530.22	540.22	548.7	754.7		
UUP	Samuel Wilson	6.90%	250	348.8	365.6	388.33	408.57	496.57	568.05
DUP	William Haggan*	9.78%	350	358.17	361.37	462.86	467.55	474.55	531.53
DUP	Andrew Blair	9.95%	356	367.78	372.88	431.85	436.34	442.34	517.29
Ulster Democratic	Robert Gordon	6.87%	246	251.32	258.42	291.81	294.21	297.21	
Alliance	Robert Kay	6.76%	242	244.09	250.39	251.78			
DUP	Joseph Seaton	6.04%	216	219.23	231.23				
Electorate: 6,888 Valid: 3,579 (51.96%) Spoilt: 69 Quota: 597 Turnout: 3,648 (52.96%)
