= Carrick Castle (District Electoral Area) =

District electoral area in Northern Ireland

- Mid and East Antrim Borough Council DEA constituency

Current constituency
- Created: 1985
- Seats: 5 (1985-)
- Councillors: Billy Ashe (DUP); David Clarke (TUV); Bethany Ferris (UUP); Lauren Gray (APNI); Robin Stewart (UUP)

Carrick Castle DEA within Mid and East Antrim

Carrick Castle DEA (1993-2014) within Carrickfergus

Carrick Castle is one of the seven district electoral areas (DEA) in Mid and East Antrim, Northern Ireland. The district elects five members to Mid and East Antrim District Council and contains the wards of Boneybefore, Castle, Kilroot, Love Lane and Victoria. Carrick Castle forms part of the East Antrim constituencies for the Northern Ireland Assembly and UK Parliament.

It was created for the 1985 local elections, replacing Carrickfergus Area C which had existed since 1973, and originally contained five wards (Killycrot, Love Lane, Milebush, Northland and Sunnylands). For the 2014 local elections it lost Sunnylands to the Knockagh DEA, but also gained parts of the abolished Kilroot DEA.

== Councillors ==
Election	Councillor (Party)	Councillor (Party)	Councillor (Party)	Councillor (Party)	Councillor (Party)
March 2024 Defection	Lauren Gray (Alliance)	Bethany Ferris (UUP)	Robin Stewart (UUP)	David Clarke (TUV)/ (Independent)/ (DUP)	Billy Ashe (DUP)
January 2024 Defection	Lauren Gray (Alliance)	Bethany Ferris (UUP)	Robin Stewart (UUP)	David Clarke (TUV)/ (Independent)/ (DUP)	Billy Ashe (DUP)
October 2023 Co-Option	Lauren Gray (Alliance)	Bethany Ferris (UUP)	Robin Stewart (UUP)	David Clarke (TUV)/ (Independent)/ (DUP)	Billy Ashe (DUP)
2023	Lauren Gray (Alliance)	Bethany Ferris (UUP)	Robin Stewart (UUP)	Cheryl Brownlee (DUP)	Billy Ashe (DUP)
October 2020 Defection	Lauren Gray (Alliance)	John McDermott (DUP)/ (UUP)	Robin Stewart (UUP)	Cheryl Brownlee (DUP)	Billy Ashe (DUP)
2019	Lauren Gray (Alliance)	John McDermott (DUP)/ (UUP)	Robin Stewart (UUP)	Cheryl Brownlee (DUP)	Billy Ashe (DUP)
October 2018 By-Election	Noel Jordan (UKIP)/ (Independent)	Peter Johnston (DUP)	Robin Stewart (UUP)	Cheryl Brownlee (DUP)	Billy Ashe (DUP)
June 2018 Defection	Noel Jordan (UKIP)/ (Independent)	James Brown (Independent)	Robin Stewart (UUP)	Cheryl Brownlee (DUP)	Billy Ashe (DUP)
April 2017 Co-Option	Noel Jordan (UKIP)/ (Independent)	James Brown (Independent)	Robin Stewart (UUP)	Cheryl Brownlee (DUP)	Billy Ashe (DUP)
2014	Noel Jordan (UKIP)/ (Independent)	James Brown (Independent)	John Stewart (UUP)	Cheryl Brownlee (DUP)	Billy Ashe (DUP)
2011	Seán Neeson (Alliance)	William Hamilton (Independent)	Elizabeth McKnight (UUP)	David Hilditch (DUP)	Deborah Emerson (DUP)
2005	Seán Neeson (Alliance)	William Hamilton (Independent)	Darin Ferguson (UUP)	David Hilditch (DUP)	Patricia McKinney (DUP)
2001	Seán Neeson (Alliance)	William Hamilton (Independent)	Darin Ferguson (UUP)	David Hilditch (DUP)	Patricia McKinney (DUP)
1997	Seán Neeson (Alliance)	William Hamilton (Independent)	Samuel McCamley (UUP)	David Hilditch (DUP)	Nicholas Wady (Independent)
1993	Seán Neeson (Alliance)	William Hamilton (Independent)	Samuel McCamley (UUP)	David Hilditch (DUP)	Arthur McQuitty (Alliance)
1989	Seán Neeson (Alliance)	Samuel Stewart (PUP)	Samuel McCamley (UUP)	Andrew Blair (DUP)	Arthur McQuitty (Alliance)
1985	Seán Neeson (Alliance)	Samuel Stewart (PUP)	Samuel McCamley (UUP)	Victor Fleming (DUP)	Robert English (UUP)

== 2023 Election ==
2019: 2 x DUP, 2 x UUP, 1 x Alliance

2023: 2 x DUP, 2 x UUP, 1 x Alliance

2019–2023 Change: No change

Carrick Castle - 5 seats
Party	Candidate	FPv%	Count						
Party	Candidate	FPv%	1	2	3	4	5	6	7
Alliance	Lauren Gray*	25.70%	1,607						
DUP	Cheryl Brownlee* †	18.45%	1,154						
DUP	Billy Ashe*	16.47%	1,030	1,047.48					
UUP	Robin Stewart*	12.01%	751	874.50	883.50	926.39	1,021.01	1,048.01	
UUP	Bethany Ferris	11.29%	706	813.92	823.91	849.54	936.77	973.77	1,070.67
TUV	Frances Henderson	6.99%	437	446.1	455.57	501.56	611.29	617.29	629.07
Green (NI)	Jenny Hutchinson	2.17%	136	420.62	421.88	425.87	426.97		
DUP	John McDermott*	4.30%	269	272.04	337.83	373.08			
PUP	Jim McCaw	2.62%	164	169.32	175.44				
Electorate: 13,886 Valid: 6,254 (45.04%) Spoilt: 71 Quota: 1,043 Turnout: 6,325 (45.54%)

== 2019 Election ==
2014: 2 x DUP, 1 x UUP, 1 x UKIP, 1 x Independent

2019: 2 x DUP, 2 x UUP, 1 x Alliance

2014-2019 Change: UUP and Alliance gain from Independent and UKIP

Carrick Castle - 5 seats
Party	Candidate	FPv%	Count						
Party	Candidate	FPv%	1	2	3	4	5	6	7
Alliance	Lauren Gray	21.40%	1,210						
DUP	Billy Ashe*	18.91%	1,069						
DUP	Cheryl Johnston*	16.86%	953						
UUP	Robin Stewart*	14.38%	813	879	906.3	928.89	979.89		
UUP	John McDermott ‡	7.87%	445	513.4	565.66	620.1	659.53	780.15	811.83
Independent	Noel Jordan*	7.62%	431	481.1	490.72	545.03	641.47	778.2	783.15
Democrats and Veterans	Si Harvey	4.69%	265	289.3	301.26	353.08	383.37		
Independent	Nicholas Wady	4.32%	244	286.3	290.2	311.79			
PUP	Jim McCaw	2.11%	119	127.4	135.46				
UKIP	John Kennedy	1.84%	104	111.2	123.68				
Electorate: 13,323 Valid: 5,653 (42.43%) Spoilt: 68 Quota: 943 Turnout: 5,721 (42.94%)

== 2014 Election ==
2011: 2 x DUP, 1 x UUP, 1 x Alliance, 1 x Independent

2014: 2 x DUP, 1 x UUP, 1 x UKIP, 1 x Independent

2011-2014 Change: UKIP gain from Alliance

Carrick Castle - 5 seats
Party	Candidate	FPv%	Count									
Party	Candidate	FPv%	1	2	3	4	5	6	7	8	9	10
UUP	John Stewart †	16.12%	939	967	1,010							
Independent	James Brown* ♭	15.14%	882	919	936	937.9	959.9	997.9				
UKIP	Noel Jordan	12.86%	749	783	857	867.45	875.45	984.45				
DUP	Billy Ashe*	12.86%	749	769	791	794.8	800.8	876.65	1,052.65			
DUP	Cheryl Johnston	7.54%	439	460	494	501.6	506.6	564.4	793.35	872.81	880.81	892.69
Alliance	Gavin Norris*	8.65%	504	523	526	527.9	536.9	852.9	867.75	868.91	872.91	874.26
DUP	Fred Cobain*	6.83%	398	405	416	418.85	419.85	463.8				
TUV	William Knox	5.80%	338	347	385	395.45	399.45					
Alliance	Elena Aceves-Cully	5.87%	342	362	363	363						
PUP	Jonathan Cooke	4.26%	248	261								
Independent	Nick Wady	2.25%	131									
Independent	John Cameron	1.80%	105									
Electorate: 12,878 Valid: 5,824 (45.22%) Spoilt: 69 Quota: 971 Turnout: 5,893 (45.76%)

== 2011 Election ==
2005: 2 x DUP, 1 x Alliance, 1 x UUP, 1 x Independent

2011: 2 x DUP, 1 x Alliance, 1 x UUP, 1 x Independent

2005-2011 Change: No change

Carrick Castle - 5 seats
Party	Candidate	FPv%	Count						
Party	Candidate	FPv%	1	2	3	4	5	6	7
Alliance	Sean Neeson*	26.44%	651						
DUP	David Hilditch*	20.59%	507						
Independent	William Hamilton*	14.87%	366	391.08	400.01	448.01			
DUP	Deborah Emerson	10.56%	260	272.16	308.07	314.97	318.97	455.97	
UUP	Elizabeth McKnight	9.87%	243	262	266.37	283.7	286.7	316.52	355.4
Alliance	Noel Williams	5.04%	124	270.68	273.34	297.84	305.84	321.96	327.63
DUP	Patricia McKinney*	7.55%	186	198.92	237.68	250.34	260.34		
Independent	Nicholas Wady	5.08%	125	145.14	147.61				
Electorate: 5,761 Valid: 2,462 (42.74%) Spoilt: 51 Quota: 411 Turnout: 2,513 (43.62%)

== 2005 Election ==
2001: 2 x DUP, 1 x Alliance, 1 x UUP, 1 x Independent

2005: 2 x DUP, 1 x Alliance, 1 x UUP, 1 x Independent

2001-2005 Change: No change

Carrick Castle - 5 seats
Party	Candidate	FPv%	Count			
Party	Candidate	FPv%	1	2	3	4
DUP	David Hilditch*	34.96%	1,052			
Alliance	Sean Neeson*	26.32%	792			
DUP	Patricia McKinney*	6.18%	186	612.12		
Independent	William Hamilton*	13.99%	421	477.18	570.46	
UUP	Darin Ferguson*	9.14%	275	312.63	415.59	494.34
Independent	Philip Mannis	6.75%	203	214.66	230.94	243.33
Independent	Nicholas Wady	2.66%	80	89.01	162.05	177.59
Electorate: 5,944 Valid: 3,009 (50.62%) Spoilt: 83 Quota: 502 Turnout: 3,092 (52.02%)

== 2001 Election ==
1997: 2 x Independent, 1 x Alliance, 1 x DUP, 1 x UUP

2001: 2 x DUP, 1 x Alliance, 1 x UUP, 1 x Independent

1997-2001 Change: DUP gain from Independent

Carrick Castle - 5 seats
Party	Candidate	FPv%	Count					
Party	Candidate	FPv%	1	2	3	4	5	6
DUP	David Hilditch*	27.80%	996					
Alliance	Sean Neeson*	18.48%	662					
Independent	William Hamilton*	15.41%	552	581.93	588.23	604.23		
UUP	Darin Ferguson	12.14%	435	448.53	456.13	487.83	528.87	589.03
DUP	Patricia McKinney	3.63%	130	443.65	446.55	451.36	465.81	530.6
Independent	William Cameron	8.46%	303	315.3	316.6	322.6	337.95	388.4
PUP	David Beck	7.23%	259	271.3	273.1	277.9	298.05	
Independent	Nicholas Wady*	3.74%	134	146.3	153.8	192.4		
Alliance	Margaret Hawkins	3.13%	112	113.64	148.04			
Electorate: 6,542 Valid: 3,583 (54.77%) Spoilt: 92 Quota: 598 Turnout: 3,675 (56.18%)

== 1997 Election ==
1993: 2 x Alliance, 1 x DUP, 1 x UUP, 1 x Independent

1997: 2 x Independent, 1 x Alliance, 1 x DUP, 1 x UUP

1993-1997 Change: Independent gain from Alliance

Carrick Castle - 5 seats
Party	Candidate	FPv%	Count					
Party	Candidate	FPv%	1	2	3	4	5	6
Alliance	Sean Neeson*	26.87%	741					
DUP	David Hilditch*	22.70%	626					
Independent	William Hamilton*	17.91%	494					
UUP	Samuel McCamley*	16.90%	466					
Independent	Nicholas Wady	8.45%	233	266.18	305.13	320.13	320.79	398.87
Alliance	Arthur McQuitty*	1.96%	54	274.92	291.32	294.12	294.97	332.75
PUP	Samuel Stewart	5.22%	144	169.2	277.44	291.44	293.09	
Electorate: 6,744 Valid: 2,758 (40.90%) Spoilt: 56 Quota: 460 Turnout: 2,814 (41.73%)

== 1993 Election ==
1989: 2 x Alliance, 1 x DUP, 1 x UUP, 1 x PUP

1993: 2 x Alliance, 1 x DUP, 1 x UUP, 1 x Independent

1989-1993 Change: Independent gain from PUP

Carrick Castle - 5 seats
Party	Candidate	FPv%	Count				
Party	Candidate	FPv%	1	2	3	4	5
Alliance	Sean Neeson*	35.91%	1,096				
DUP	David Hilditch	22.80%	696				
Independent	William Hamilton	19.00%	580				
Alliance	Arthur McQuitty*	3.01%	92	532.73			
UUP	Samuel McCamley*	7.57%	231	267.58	358.93	379.09	556.58
PUP	Samuel Stewart*	6.00%	183	243.18	292.88	327.44	351.69
UUP	Robert McCartney	5.70%	174	218.25	259.55	274.67	
Electorate: 6,731 Valid: 3,052 (45.34%) Spoilt: 67 Quota: 510 Turnout: 3,119 (46.34%)

== 1989 Election ==
1985: 2 x UUP, 1 x Alliance, 1 x DUP, 1 x PUP

1989: 2 x Alliance, 1 x DUP, 1 x UUP, 1 x PUP

1985-1989 Change: Alliance gain from UUP

Carrick Castle - 5 seats
Party	Candidate	FPv%	Count					
Party	Candidate	FPv%	1	2	3	4	5	6
Alliance	Sean Neeson*	32.91%	1,029					
PUP	Samuel Stewart*	15.09%	472	531.16				
UUP	Samuel McCamley*	9.18%	287	320.15	362.72	381.29	398.88	567.88
DUP	Andrew Blair	9.31%	291	298.65	301.16	444.69	458.22	492.79
Alliance	Arthur McQuitty	2.59%	81	369.66	375.72	376.72	458.75	476.93
Protestant Unionist	David Hilditch	9.66%	302	315.77	325.83	339.34	353.87	383.4
UUP	Robert English*	7.29%	228	245.85	263.91	275.91	290.48	
Independent	Patrick Lennox	5.47%	171	222	225.51	226.51		
UUP	Margaret Cross	6.08%	190	199.69	203.2			
UUP	Sarah Picken	2.43%	76	93.34				
Electorate: 6,840 Valid: 3,127 (45.72%) Spoilt: 54 Quota: 522 Turnout: 3,181 (46.51%)

== 1985 Election ==
1985: 2 x UUP, 1 x Alliance, 1 x DUP, 1 x PUP

Carrick Castle - 5 seats
Party	Candidate	FPv%	Count							
Party	Candidate	FPv%	1	2	3	4	5	6	7	8
Alliance	Sean Neeson*	29.92%	1,005							
DUP	Victor Fleming	14.20%	477	488.7	503.7	582.7				
UUP	Samuel McCamley	12.89%	433	485.2	550.25	571.25				
UUP	Robert English	12.21%	410	430.7	477.85	500.15	582.25			
PUP	Samuel Stewart	9.35%	314	349.55	354.9	378.5	440.15	441.65	458.45	461.89
DUP	James Strange*	8.01%	269	283.85	295.3	411.15	422.6	443.3	448.34	456.08
Alliance	Owen Mulvenna	1.82%	61	331.9	333.35	334.8				
DUP	Gladys Service	7.35%	247	269.95	273.4					
UUP	James McBride	4.26%	143	153.35						
Electorate: 6,872 Valid: 3,359 (48.88%) Spoilt: 81 Quota: 560 Turnout: 3,440 (50.06%)
