= Fred Cobain =

Fred Cobain MBE

Belfast City Councillor
- Incumbent
- Assumed office 2 May 2019
- Preceded by: Lydia Patterson
- Constituency: Castle
- In office 5 May 2005 – 27 August 2010
- Preceded by: Billy Hutchinson
- Succeeded by: Fred Rodgers
- Constituency: Oldpark
- In office 15 May 1985 – 7 June 2001
- Preceded by: District created
- Succeeded by: Elaine McMillen
- Constituency: Court

Carrickfergus Borough Councillor
- In office 30 December 2013 – 22 May 2014
- Preceded by: David Hilditch
- Succeeded by: Council abolished
- Constituency: Carrick Castle

Member of the Northern Ireland Assembly for Belfast North
- In office 25 June 1998 – 2011
- Preceded by: New Creation
- Succeeded by: Paula Bradley

Personal details
- Born: 30 April 1946 (age 80) Belfast, Northern Ireland
- Party: Democratic Unionist Party (since 2013)
- Other political affiliations: Ulster Unionist Party (until 2013)
- Spouse: Sandra Cobain
- Website: http://www.fredcobain.com

Fred Cobain, MBE (born 30 April 1946) is a Democratic Unionist Party (DUP) politician from Northern Ireland, serving as a Belfast City Councillor for the Castle DEA since 2019 . He was previously an Ulster Unionist Party (UUP) Member of the Northern Ireland Assembly (MLA) for Belfast North from 1998 until 2011.

== Political career ==
Cobain was first elected to Belfast City Council in 1985. He served as Lord Mayor of Belfast in 1990–1991. In 1996, he was an unsuccessful candidate in the Northern Ireland Forum election in North Belfast. He was later elected as an Ulster Unionist Party MLA for North Belfast in 1998.

Cobain was Chair of the Assembly's Committee for Social Development and served two terms on the Northern Ireland Policing Board.

On 29 December 2007 he was named MBE in the New Year Honours 2008.

After the Christmas 2010 water crisis, Cobain supported a vote of no confidence in Regional Development Minister Conor Murphy, saying "At the end of the day in all of these issues the individual who leads the department is responsible and I have to say if this was any other part of the UK, or any other part of these islands, the minister would have been away weeks ago...This minister doesn't appear to accept any responsibility for anything."

He lost his seat in the 2011 Assembly election.

On 14 January 2013, Fred Cobain left the Ulster Unionist party which he had served for more than 30 years. He joined the Democratic Unionist Party saying the UUP was "riven with personal and policy divisions" and was "politically exhausted". Cobain was co-opted on to Carrickfergus Borough Council as a councillor for the Carrick Castle area. He ran for the DUP but failed to be elected to the Mid and East Antrim Borough Council in the May 2014 Elections. He was elected for the DUP to the Castle electoral area of Belfast City Council in the May 2019 Elections.

== Family ==
He is married and has two children.

Civic offices
Preceded by Sir Reg Empey	Lord Mayor of Belfast; 1990–1991	Succeeded by Nigel Dodds
Northern Ireland Assembly
New assembly	MLA for Belfast North; 1998–2011	Succeeded by Paula Bradley
