= Kilroot (District Electoral Area) =

District electoral areas in Carrickfergus, Northern Ireland

Kilroot DEA (1993-2014) within Carrickfergus

Kilroot was one of the three district electoral areas in Carrickfergus, Northern Ireland which existed from 1985 to 2014. The district elected five members to Carrickfergus Borough Council from 1985 to 1993, and six members from 1993 to 2014, and formed part of the East Antrim constituencies for the Northern Ireland Assembly and UK Parliament.

It was created for the 1985 local elections, replacing Carrickfergus Area B which had existed since 1973, and contained the wards of Blackhead, Boneybefore, Eden, Victoria and Whitehead. For the 1993 local elections, it gained a sixth ward, Bluefield. It was abolished for the 2014 local elections and most of the area was transferred to the Carrick Castle DEA, with Whitehead moving to the Larne Lough DEA.

== Councillors ==
Election	Councillor (Party)	Councillor (Party)	Councillor (Party)	Councillor (Party)	Councillor (Party)	Councillor (Party)
2011	Isobel Day (Alliance)	Eric Ferguson (UUP)	Lynn McClurg (DUP)	Terence Clements (DUP)	Billy Ashe (DUP)	James Brown (UUP)/ (Independent Unionist)
2005	Isobel Day (Alliance)	Eric Ferguson (UUP)	Lynn McClurg (DUP)	Terence Clements (DUP)	Billy Ashe (DUP)	James Brown (UUP)/ (Independent Unionist)
2001	Brenda Crampsey (Alliance)	Eric Ferguson (UUP)	Robin Cavan (Alliance)	Terence Clements (DUP)	Billy Ashe (DUP)	James Brown (UUP)/ (Independent Unionist)
1997	Brenda Crampsey (Alliance)	Eric Ferguson (UUP)	Robin Cavan (Alliance)	Samuel Crowe (Conservative)/ (Independent Unionist)	Billy Ashe (DUP)	James Brown (UUP)/ (Independent Unionist)
1993	Brenda Crampsey (Alliance)	Alexander Beggs (UUP)	William Donaldson (Alliance)	Samuel Crowe (Conservative)/ (Independent Unionist)	Robert Patton (UUP)/ (Independent Unionist)	James Brown (UUP)/ (Independent Unionist)
1989	Brenda Crampsey (Alliance)	Alexander Beggs (UUP)	William Cross (DUP)	5 seats 1985–1993	Robert Patton (UUP)/ (Independent Unionist)	James Brown (UUP)/ (Independent Unionist)
1985	Brenda Crampsey (Alliance)	Wesley Mitchell (UUP)	William Cross (DUP)	5 seats 1985–1993	Robert Patton (UUP)/ (Independent Unionist)	James Brown (UUP)/ (Independent Unionist)

== 2011 Election ==
2005: 3 x DUP, 1 x Alliance, 1 x UUP, 1 x Independent

2011: 3 x DUP, 1 x Alliance, 1 x UUP, 1 x Independent

2005-2011 Change: No change

Kilroot - 6 seats
Party	Candidate	FPv%	Count					
Party	Candidate	FPv%	1	2	3	4	5	6
Independent	James Brown*	22.17%	1,179					
DUP	Billy Ashe*	22.06%	1,173					
DUP	Terence Clements*	9.68%	515	631.4	909.32			
Alliance	Isobel Day*	12.99%	691	753.8	762.08			
DUP	Lynn McClurg*	7.35%	391	456.2	545.84	558.6	688.94	744.77
UUP	Eric Ferguson*	6.75%	359	428.6	443.36	455.64	464.57	726.59
Alliance	Robert Logan	9.27%	493	521.8	525.04	626.04	628.13	672.21
UUP	Cathy Vizard	6.54%	348	402.4	413.92	425.56	426.51	
Green (NI)	Mark Bailey	3.18%	169	186.2	191.96			
Electorate: 11,430 Valid: 5,318 (46.53%) Spoilt: 78 Quota: 760 Turnout: 5,396 (47.21%)

== 2005 Election ==
2001: 2 x DUP, 2 x Alliance, 1 x UUP, 1 x Independent

2005: 3 x DUP, 1 x Alliance, 1 x UUP, 1 x Independent

2001-2005 Change: DUP gain from Alliance

Kilroot - 6 seats
Party	Candidate	FPv%	Count				
Party	Candidate	FPv%	1	2	3	4	5
DUP	Billy Ashe*	31.05%	1,775				
Independent	James Brown*	20.33%	1,162				
DUP	Terence Clements*	6.56%	375	1,178.52			
UUP	Eric Ferguson*	10.88%	622	650.08	673.83	820.15	
Alliance	Isobel Day	12.40%	709	721.42	725.67	740.21	851.81
DUP	Lynn McClurg	4.41%	252	334.62	661.37	678.9	834.1
Alliance	Robert Logan	11.12%	636	641.94	644.69	655.94	726.74
UUP	Carolyn Howarth	3.25%	186	196.8	200.3		
Electorate: 10,494 Valid: 5,717 (54.48%) Spoilt: 121 Quota: 817 Turnout: 5,838 (55.63%)

== 2001 Election ==
1997: 2 x Alliance, 2 x Independent Unionist, 1 x UUP, 1 x DUP

2001: 2 x Alliance, 2 x DUP, 1 x UUP, 1 x Independent

1997-2001 Change: DUP gain from Independent Unionist, Independent Unionist becomes Independent

Kilroot - 6 seats
Party	Candidate	FPv%	Count			
Party	Candidate	FPv%	1	2	3	4
DUP	Billy Ashe*	23.04%	1,425			
Independent	James Brown*	20.62%	1,275			
UUP	Eric Ferguson*	17.67%	1,093			
DUP	Terence Clements	6.95%	430	918.28		
Alliance	Brenda Crampsey*	13.05%	807	814.8	911.6	
Alliance	Robert Cavan*	11.06%	684	699.6	776.16	875.63
Independent	Samuel Crowe*	7.60%	470	489.89	706.81	811.5
Electorate: 10,903 Valid: 6,184 (56.72%) Spoilt: 145 Quota: 884 Turnout: 6,329 (58.05%)

== 1997 Election ==
1993: 2 x Alliance, 2 x UUP, 1 x Conservative, 1 x Independent Unionist

1997: 2 x Alliance, 2 x Independent Unionist, 1 x UUP, 1 x DUP

1993-1997 Change: DUP gain from Independent Unionist, Independent Unionists leave UUP and Conservatives

Kilroot - 6 seats
Party	Candidate	FPv%	Count						
Party	Candidate	FPv%	1	2	3	4	5	6	7
Ind. Unionist	James Brown*	21.31%	908						
Ind. Unionist	Samuel Crowe*	12.98%	553	633.28					
Alliance	Brenda Crampsey*	13.00%	554	571.64	593.36	595.76	613.76		
DUP	Billy Ashe	8.38%	357	392.28	402.64	404.08	462.96	679.96	
Alliance	Robert Cavan	12.46%	531	553.68	570.76	572.8	590	605.8	608.92
UUP	Eric Ferguson	8.71%	371	418.52	428.68	435.76	482.64	511.64	547
UUP	Colin McAuley	8.50%	362	389	404.16	407.76	445	482.16	513.88
DUP	Desmond Robinson	6.13%	261	286.92	298.36	301.72	351.24		
PUP	Billy Donaldson	5.56%	237	258.96	284.12	287.12			
Independent	Norman Dixon	2.98%	127	139.96					
Electorate: 10,234 Valid: 4,261 (41.64%) Spoilt: 56 Quota: 609 Turnout: 4,317 (42.18%)

== 1993 Election ==
1989: 2 x UUP, 1 x Alliance, 1 x DUP, 1 x Independent Unionist

1993: 2 x Alliance, 2 x UUP, 1 x Conservative, 1 x Independent Unionist

1989-1993 Change: Alliance and Conservative gain from DUP and due to the addition of one seat

Kilroot - 6 seats
Party	Candidate	FPv%	Count								
Party	Candidate	FPv%	1	2	3	4	5	6	7	8	9
Alliance	Brenda Crampsey*	20.13%	850								
Alliance	William Donaldson	9.21%	389	568.22	568.51	573.83	579.7	589.44	591.44	625.44	
Ind. Unionist	Robert Patton*	9.21%	389	400.02	403.31	416.63	427.21	442.5	454.4	588.69	603.69
UUP	James Brown*	12.34%	521	523.9	532.19	535.19	552.19	555.19	560.19	574.19	574.19
NI Conservatives	Samuel Crowe	10.90%	460	469.57	470.57	530.15	533.73	540.73	546.73	559.02	562.02
UUP	Alexander Beggs*	10.97%	463	471.7	490.99	494.86	550.02	572.31	579.31	593.31	593.31
DUP	William Cross*	9.55%	403	406.19	409.19	412.19	419.19	425.19	535.19	547.48	547.48
Independent Labour	Norman Dixon	5.42%	229	234.22	234.22	236.22	237.22	298.67	299.67		
DUP	Eric Higgins	3.43%	145	145.58	146.58	147.58	149.58	151.58			
Independent Labour	William Venables	2.91%	123	128.51	135.51	137.8	142.09				
UUP	Ronald Mowat	2.20%	93	96.48	109.77	120.93					
NI Conservatives	Robert Wilson	2.39%	101	109.41	109.7						
UUP	Eric Ferguson	1.33%	56	57.74							
Electorate: 9,306 Valid: 4,222 (45.37%) Spoilt: 109 Quota: 605 Turnout: 4,331 (46.54%)

== 1989 Election ==
1985: 3 x UUP, 1 x Alliance, 1 x DUP

1989: 2 x UUP, 1 x Alliance, 1 x DUP, 1 x Independent Unionist

1985-1989 Change: Independent Unionist leaves UUP

Kilroot - 5 seats
Party	Candidate	FPv%	Count					
Party	Candidate	FPv%	1	2	3	4	5	6
UUP	Alexander Beggs	20.05%	739					
Alliance	Brenda Crampsey*	19.51%	719					
Ind. Unionist	Robert Patton*	18.13%	668					
UUP	James Brown*	16.26%	599	668.02				
DUP	William Cross*	14.52%	535	545.37	547.92	558	574.11	660.11
Alliance	David McCann	5.78%	213	216.74	309.89	310.87	327.16	383.59
UUP	Eric Ferguson	5.75%	212	250.59	257.49	298.37	314.84	
Electorate: 7,981 Valid: 3,685 (46.17%) Spoilt: 84 Quota: 615 Turnout: 3,769 (47.22%)

== 1985 Election ==
1985: 3 x UUP, 1 x Alliance, 1 x DUP

Kilroot - 5 seats
Party	Candidate	FPv%	Count					
Party	Candidate	FPv%	1	2	3	4	5	6
UUP	James Brown*	31.37%	1,146					
DUP	William Cross*	19.03%	695					
Alliance	Brenda Crampsey	16.84%	615					
UUP	Wesley Mitchell	5.56%	203	485.47	487.99	500.35	533.4	614.4
UUP	Robert Patton	6.68%	244	361.97	367.13	373.25	401.01	485.66
Ind. Unionist	Robert Hunter	8.49%	310	369.69	375.09	380.21	447.15	484.79
DUP	William Sloan	3.59%	131	157.32	218.16	328.43	337.32	
Alliance	Elma McMaster	5.15%	188	214.32	215.64	218.58		
DUP	Raymond Templeton	3.31%	121	137.45	143.69			
Electorate: 6,968 Valid: 3,653 (52.43%) Spoilt: 89 Quota: 609 Turnout: 3,742 (53.70%)
