= Knockagh (District Electoral Area) =

District electoral area in County Antrim, Northern Ireland

- Mid and East Antrim Borough Council DEA constituency

Current constituency
- Created: 1985
- Seats: 5 (1985-1993); 6 (1993-2014); 5 (2014-)
- Councillors: Marc Collins (DUP); Bobby Hadden (IND); Peter Johnston (DUP); Aaron Skinner (APNI); Andrew Wilson (UUP)

Knockagh DEA within Mid and East Antrim

Knockagh Monument DEA (1993-2014) within Carrickfergus

Knockagh is one of the seven district electoral areas (DEA) in Mid and East Antrim, Northern Ireland. The district elects five members to Mid and East Antrim District Council and contains the wards of Burleigh Hill, Gortalee, Greenisland, Sunnylands and Woodburn. Knockagh forms part of the East Antrim constituencies for the Northern Ireland Assembly and UK Parliament.

It was created for the 1985 local elections, replacing Carrickfergus Area A which had existed since 1973. It was called Knockagh Monument until 2014, and contained five wards (Clipperstown, Gortalee, Greenisland, Knockagh and Woodburn). For the 1993 local elections, it gained a sixth ward, Burleigh Hill. For the 2014 local elections it was reduced by one ward, with Clipperstown replaced with Sunnylands.

== Councillors ==
Election	Councillor (party)	Councillor (party)	Councillor (party)	Councillor (party)	Councillor (party)	Councillor (party)
2023	Aaron Skinner (Alliance)	Bobby Hadden (Independent)	Andrew Wilson (UUP)	Peter Johnston (DUP)	Marc Collins (DUP)	5 seats 2014–present
2019	Noel Williams (Alliance)	Bobby Hadden (Independent)	Andrew Wilson (UUP)	Peter Johnston (DUP)	Marc Collins (DUP)	5 seats 2014–present
March 2019 defection	Paul Sinclair (Alliance)	Lindsay Millar (UUP)	Andrew Wilson (UUP)	Lynn McClurg (DUP)	May Beattie (TUV)/ (DUP)	5 seats 2014–present
2014	Paul Sinclair (Alliance)	Lindsay Millar (UUP)	Andrew Wilson (UUP)	Lynn McClurg (DUP)	May Beattie (TUV)/ (DUP)	5 seats 2014–present
2011	Stewart Dickson (Alliance)	John Stewart (UUP)	Andrew Wilson (UUP)	James McClurg (DUP)	May Beattie (TUV)/ (DUP)	Charie Johnston (DUP)
2005	Stewart Dickson (Alliance)	Roy Beggs Jr (UUP)	Mark Cosgrove (UUP)	James McClurg (DUP)	May Beattie (TUV)/ (DUP)	Louise Marsden (DUP)
2001	Stewart Dickson (Alliance)	Roy Beggs Jr (UUP)	Gwendoline Wilson (UUP)	James McClurg (DUP)	May Beattie (TUV)/ (DUP)	Noreen McIlwrath (Alliance)
1997	Stewart Dickson (Alliance)	Joseph Reid (UUP)	Thomas Creighton (UUP)	Charles Johnston (Independent Unionist)	May Beattie (TUV)/ (DUP)	Noreen McIlwrath (Alliance)
1993	Stewart Dickson (Alliance)	Joseph Reid (UUP)	David Apsley (UUP)	Charles Johnston (Independent Unionist)	William Haggan (DUP)	Noreen McIlwrath (Alliance)
1989	Stewart Dickson (Alliance)	William Murray (UUP)	Mary Ardill (UUP)/ (Independent Unionist)	Charles Johnston (Independent Unionist)	William Haggan (DUP)	5 seats 1985–1993
1985	Stewart Dickson (Alliance)	Samuel Wilson (UUP)	Mary Ardill (UUP)/ (Independent Unionist)	Charles Johnston (Independent Unionist)	William Haggan (DUP)	5 seats 1985–1993

== 2023 election ==
2019: 2 x DUP, 1 x UUP, 1 x Alliance, 1 x Independent

2023: 2 x DUP, 1 x Alliance, 1 x UUP, 1 x Independent

2019–2023 change: No change

Knockagh - 5 seats
Party	Candidate	FPv%	Count				
Party	Candidate	FPv%	1	2	3	4	5
Independent	Bobby Hadden*	18.22%	1,182				
DUP	Peter Johnston*	17.64%	1,144				
DUP	Marc Collins*	14.35%	931	957.19	1,191.19		
UUP	Andrew Wilson*	12.21%	792	809.19	868.19	1,266.15	
Alliance	Aaron Skinner	13.92%	903	917.58	919.67	954.67	1,075.81
Alliance	Noel Williams*	11.61%	753	763.53	770.89	788.67	856.48
UUP	Gary McCabe	6.68%	433	446.23	478.23		
TUV	James Strange	5.37%	348	358.53			
Electorate: 13,223 Valid: 6,486 (49.05%) Spoilt: 59 Quota: 1,082 Turnout: 6,545 (49.50%)

== 2019 election ==
2014: 2 x DUP, 2 x UUP, 1 x Alliance

2019: 2 x DUP, 1 x UUP, 1 x Alliance, 1 x Independent

2014-2019 change: Independent gain from UUP

Knockagh - 5 seats
Party	Candidate	FPv%	Count			
Party	Candidate	FPv%	1	2	3	4
Alliance	Noel Williams	20.57%	1,173			
DUP	Peter Johnston	16.96%	967			
DUP	Marc Collins –	14.84%	846	854.16	1,016.16	
Independent	Bobby Hadden	13.99%	798	887.76	980.76	
UUP	Andrew Wilson*	13.71%	782	833.12	903	919.82
UUP	Lindsay Millar*	10.94%	624	675.84	825.92	873.48
TUV	May Beattie*	5.75%	328	336.88		
PUP	David Barnett	3.24%	185	190.28		
Electorate: 12,289 Valid: 5,703 (46.41%) Spoilt: 59 Quota: 951 Turnout: 5,762 (46.89%)

== 2014 election ==
2011: 3 x DUP, 2 x UUP, 1 x Alliance

2014: 2 x DUP, 2 x UUP, 1 x Alliance

2011-2014 change: DUP loss due to the reduction of one seat

Knockagh - 5 seats
Party	Candidate	FPv%	Count								
Party	Candidate	FPv%	1	2	3	4	5	6	7	8	9
UUP	Andrew Wilson*	16.23%	912	927	939						
DUP	May Beattie*	15.20%	854	858	881	966					
DUP	Lynn McClurg*	6.41%	360	362	371	530	548.02	548.02	604.56	613.56	937.56
Alliance	Paul Sinclair	8.53%	479	492	511	515	515.68	515.68	519.68	876.68	892.02
UUP	Lindsay Millar	10.34%	581	592	622	629	630.7	631.7	725.7	754.7	852
TUV	Ken McFaul	9.91%	557	561	578	588	588.68	588.88	721.56	733.56	789.92
DUP	Robert Stewart	8.49%	477	488	495	530	535.78	536.38	577.38	590.38	
Alliance	Noel Williams*	7.42%	417	429	436	436	436	436	440		
PUP	Gareth Cole	5.36%	301	305	424	434	435.36	436.56			
DUP	Robert Harrison-Rice	5.57%	313	318	323						
PUP	Jim McCaw	2.78%	156	156							
NI Conservatives	Gary Broad	1.90%	107	113							
Independent	Barry Patterson	1.85%	104								
Electorate: 12,090 Valid: 5,618 (46.47%) Spoilt: 65 Quota: 937 Turnout: 5,683 (47.01%)

== 2011 election ==
2005: 3 x DUP, 2 x UUP, 1 x Alliance

2011: 3 x DUP, 2 x UUP, 1 x Alliance

2005-2011 change: No change

Knockagh Monument - 6 seats
Party	Candidate	FPv%	Count						
Party	Candidate	FPv%	1	2	3	4	5	6	7
DUP	May Beattie*	23.47%	1,085						
Alliance	Stewart Dickson*	18.07%	835						
DUP	Charie Johnston	9.32%	431	677.8					
DUP	James McClurg*	12.12%	560	605.2	611.6	621.68	837.68		
UUP	Andrew Wilson	12.29%	568	581.2	586.2	594.81	615.26	651.26	654.71
UUP	John Stewart	9.82%	454	468.8	479.8	490.51	520.76	579.76	591.01
Alliance	Shireen Bell	6.84%	316	327.6	403.6	535.9	550.95	575.95	577.85
DUP	Louise Marsden*	5.37%	248	332.4	335.4	340.02			
Green (NI)	Brian Luney	2.70%	125	126.6					
Electorate: 10,090 Valid: 4,622 (45.81%) Spoilt: 81 Quota: 661 Turnout: 4,703 (46.61%)

== 2005 election ==
2001: 2 x DUP, 2 x UUP, 2 x Alliance

2005: 3 x DUP, 2 x UUP, 1 x Alliance

2001-2005 change: DUP gain from Alliance

Knockagh Monument - 6 seats
Party	Candidate	FPv%	Count						
Party	Candidate	FPv%	1	2	3	4	5	6	7
DUP	May Beattie*	33.20%	1,718						
UUP	Roy Beggs Jr*	19.46%	1,007						
Alliance	Stewart Dickson*	15.17%	785						
DUP	Louise Marsden	4.14%	214	926.82					
DUP	James McClurg*	8.56%	443	571.18	594.7	770.05			
UUP	Mark Cosgrove	4.89%	253	300.56	456.24	458.49	461.19	637.85	729.17
Alliance	Shireen Bell	5.72%	296	330.8	352.92	353.52	390.78	406.96	453.98
Independent	Robert Rice	5.66%	293	311.56	317.72	318.77	320.75	330.45	
UUP	Jackie Glover	3.19%	165	194	249.44	250.64	252.26		
Electorate: 9,540 Valid: 5,174 (54.23%) Spoilt: 111 Quota: 740 Turnout: 5,285 (55.40%)

== 2001 election ==
1997: 2 x UUP, 2 x Alliance, 1 x DUP, 1 x Independent Unionist

2001: 2 x UUP, 2 x Alliance, 2 x DUP

1997-2001 change: DUP gain from Independent Unionist

Knockagh Monument - 6 seats
Party	Candidate	FPv%	Count					
Party	Candidate	FPv%	1	2	3	4	5	6
UUP	Roy Beggs Jr	27.87%	1,575					
DUP	May Beattie*	25.13%	1,420					
Alliance	Stewart Dickson*	20.62%	1,165					
UUP	Gwendoline Wilson	11.06%	625	1,203.88				
DUP	James McClurg	8.87%	501	598.2	1,168.78			
Alliance	Noreen McIlwrath*	3.52%	199	257.86	270.55	493.57	560.78	894.41
PUP	Carolyn Howarth	2.94%	166	194.08	212.88	300.9	422.63	439.13
Electorate: 9,812 Valid: 5,651 (57.59%) Spoilt: 139 Quota: 808 Turnout: 5,790 (59.01%)

== 1997 election ==
1993: 2 x UUP, 2 x Alliance, 1 x DUP, 1 x Independent Unionist

1997: 2 x UUP, 2 x Alliance, 1 x DUP, 1 x Independent Unionist

1993-1997 change: No change

Knockagh Monument - 6 seats
Party	Candidate	FPv%	Count			
Party	Candidate	FPv%	1	2	3	4
Alliance	Stewart Dickson*	23.03%	867			
UUP	Thomas Creighton	20.03%	754			
DUP	May Beattie	15.41%	580			
UUP	Joseph Reid*	10.02%	377	392.99	544.95	
Ind. Unionist	Charles Johnston*	12.14%	457	486.25	507.71	552.71
Alliance	Noreen McIlwrath*	5.55%	209	479.66	488.36	514.45
DUP	William Haggan*	8.93%	336	342.63	364.96	425.38
PUP	Carolyn Howarth	4.89%	184	189.85	196.81	
Electorate: 9,549 Valid: 3,764 (39.42%) Spoilt: 65 Quota: 538 Turnout: 3,829 (40.10%)

== 1993 election ==
1989: 2 x Independent Unionist, 1 x Alliance, 1 x UUP, 1 x DUP

1993: 2 x Alliance, 2 x UUP, 1 x DUP, 1 x Independent Unionist

1989-1993 change: Alliance and UUP gain from Independent Unionist and due to the addition of one seat

Knockagh Monument - 6 seats
Party	Candidate	FPv%	Count					
Party	Candidate	FPv%	1	2	3	4	5	6
Alliance	Stewart Dickson*	25.80%	947					
UUP	David Apsley	18.64%	684					
Ind. Unionist	Charles Johnston*	13.41%	492	549.04				
UUP	Joseph Reid*	6.29%	231	242.96	277.69	286.07	324.22	535.59
Alliance	Noreen McIlwrath	3.98%	146	463.4	465.01	470.93	507.3	521.74
DUP	William Haggan*	11.42%	419	426.82	437.4	438.63	451.78	475.08
DUP	May Beattie	9.84%	361	366.52	383.77	386.77	397.15	407.22
UUP	Mary McFall	4.77%	175	183.74	264.01	268.47	299	
NI Conservatives	Nicola Eakin	3.30%	121	129.28	134.34	203.72		
NI Conservatives	Charles Moffett	2.56%	94	98.14	100.44			
Electorate: 8,859 Valid: 3,670 (41.43%) Spoilt: 96 Quota: 526 Turnout: 3,766 (42.51%)

== 1989 election ==
1985: 2 x UUP, 1 x Alliance, 1 x DUP, 1 x Independent Unionist

1989: 2 x Independent Unionist, 1 x UUP, 1 x UUP, 1 x DUP

1985-1989 change: Independent Unionist leaves UUP

Knockagh Monument - 5 seats
Party	Candidate	FPv%	Count					
Party	Candidate	FPv%	1	2	3	4	5	6
DUP	William Haggan*	19.22%	668					
Alliance	Stewart Dickson*	18.70%	650					
Ind. Unionist	Charles Johnston*	18.07%	628					
UUP	William Murray	14.47%	503	536.6	538.14	551.26	566.03	641.03
Ind. Unionist	Mary Ardill*	12.51%	435	445.08	451.79	466.43	525.76	552.16
UUP	Samuel Wilson*	8.98%	312	337.2	338.19	343.87	356.28	402.5
Protestant Unionist	John Everitt	4.86%	169	183.98	184.31	189.03	194.74	
Alliance	Noreen McIlwrath	3.19%	111	111.98	171.05	176.89		
Electorate: 7,803 Valid: 3,476 (44.55%) Spoilt: 73 Quota: 580 Turnout: 3,549 (45.48%)

== 1985 election ==
1985: 2 x UUP, 1 x Alliance, 1 x DUP, 1 x Independent Unionist

Knockagh Monument - 5 seats
Party	Candidate	FPv%	Count						
Party	Candidate	FPv%	1	2	3	4	5	6	7
UUP	Mary Ardill*	20.56%	736						
Ind. Unionist	Charles Johnston*	18.44%	660						
Alliance	Stewart Dickson	14.61%	523	530.22	540.22	548.7	754.7		
UUP	Samuel Wilson	6.90%	250	348.8	365.6	388.33	408.57	496.57	568.05
DUP	William Haggan*	9.78%	350	358.17	361.37	462.86	467.55	474.55	531.53
DUP	Andrew Blair	9.95%	356	367.78	372.88	431.85	436.34	442.34	517.29
Ulster Democratic	Robert Gordon	6.87%	246	251.32	258.42	291.81	294.21	297.21	
Alliance	Robert Kay	6.76%	242	244.09	250.39	251.78			
DUP	Joseph Seaton	6.04%	216	219.23	231.23				
Electorate: 6,888 Valid: 3,579 (51.96%) Spoilt: 69 Quota: 597 Turnout: 3,648 (52.96%)
