= Paula Bradley =

Deputy Leader of the Democratic Unionist Party

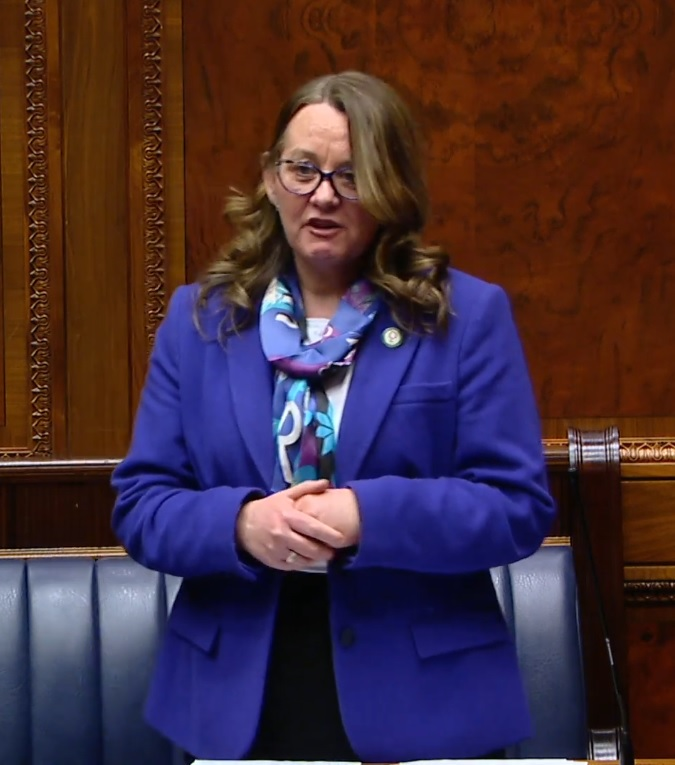
- Bradley in 2021

Deputy Leader of the Democratic Unionist Party
- In office 28 May 2021 – 9 June 2023
- Leader: Edwin Poots; Jeffrey Donaldson
- Preceded by: Nigel Dodds
- Succeeded by: Gavin Robinson

Member of Antrim and Newtownabbey Borough Council
- Incumbent
- Assumed office 31 May 2022
- Preceded by: Phillip Brett
- Constituency: Glengormley Urban

Member of the Legislative Assembly for Belfast North
- In office 5 May 2011 – 28 March 2022
- Preceded by: Fred Cobain
- Succeeded by: Phillip Brett

Member of Newtownabbey Borough Council
- In office 5 May 2005 – 22 May 2014
- Preceded by: Arthur Templeton
- Succeeded by: Council abolished
- Constituency: Antrim Line

Personal details
- Born: 23 June 1969 (age 57) Carnmoney, Northern Ireland
- Party: Democratic Unionist Party
- Spouse: Robert Bradley (div. 1996)
- Children: 2
- Profession: Police officer, social worker

Paula Bradley (born 23 June 1969) is a Northern Irish unionist politician who served as Deputy Leader of the Democratic Unionist Party (DUP) from May 2021 to June 2023, and an Antrim and Newtownabbey Councillor for the Glengormley Urban DEA since 2022. She was a Member of the Northern Ireland Assembly (MLA) for Belfast North from 2011 to 2022. She also served as Deputy Mayor of Newtownabbey Borough Council from 2009 to 2010.

== Career ==
Bradley was first elected to Newtownabbey Council in the 2005 local election, representing the Antrim Line District. She served as deputy mayor in 2009–2010 and was elected mayor in June 2010. Outside politics, she has worked as a social worker at Antrim Area Hospital.

Bradley was elected to the Northern Ireland Assembly in the 2011 election, as an MLA for Belfast North, and also retained her council seat on the local elections held on the same day.

She was elected Deputy Leader of the Democratic Unionist Party on 14 May 2021, and became the first woman to hold the office on 28 May 2021.

In July 2021 Bradley said that some of the things said about the LGBT community by her party colleagues had been “absolutely atrocious” and that she was sorry: “I can certainly say I apologise for what others have said and done in the past, because I do think there have been some very hurtful comments and some language that really should not have been used.”

Bradley announced on 17 March 2022 that she would not seek re-election at the 2022 Assembly election, reversing a decision she had previously made. She told BBC News NI that she wanted to look after her mother, Charlotte, who has a number of health issues. "My mum needs me more and I have decided to prioritise her over my political career," she said. "She sacrificed so much for me and I feel I need to be there for her."

In May 2022, after standing down from the Assembly, she was co-opted onto Antrim and Newtownabbey Borough Council, as a representative of Glengormley Urban, to replace Phillip Brett, who succeeded Bradley as a North Belfast MLA in the Assembly election held that same month. She was re-elected to the council in the 2023 local elections.

Civic offices
| Preceded by John Scott | Mayor of Newtownabbey; 2010–2011 | Succeeded by Billy Webb |
Northern Ireland Assembly
| Preceded by Fred Cobain | MLA for Belfast North; 2011–2022 | Succeeded by Phillip Brett |
