= Roy Beggs Jr =

Northern Irish politician (born 1962)

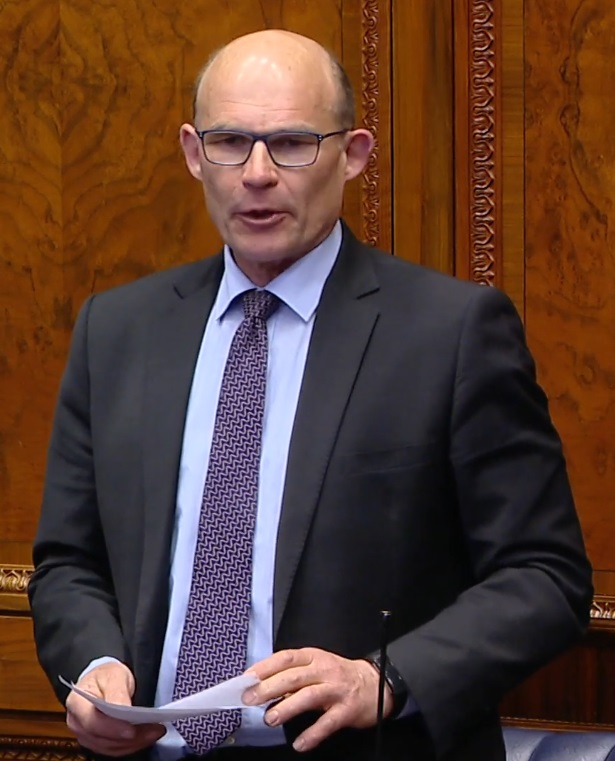

Member of Mid and East Antrim Borough Council
- Incumbent
- Assumed office 18 May 2023
- Preceded by: Keith Turner
- Constituency: Larne Lough

Deputy Speaker of the Northern Ireland Assembly
- In office 11 January 2020 – 31 May 2022
- Preceded by: Danny Kennedy
- Succeeded by: John Blair (2024)
- In office 12 May 2011 – 30 March 2016
- Preceded by: David McClarty
- Succeeded by: Danny Kennedy

Member of the Northern Ireland Assembly for East Antrim
- In office 25 June 1998 – 27 March 2022
- Preceded by: New Creation
- Succeeded by: Danny Donnelly

Member of Carrickfergus Borough Council
- In office 7 June 2001 – 5 May 2011
- Preceded by: Joseph Reid
- Succeeded by: John Stewart
- Constituency: Knockagh

Personal details
- Born: 3 July 1962 (age 64) Glenoe, Northern Ireland
- Party: Ulster Unionist Party
- Spouse: Sandra Beggs
- Children: 3
- Education: Queen's University of Belfast
- Profession: Engineer
- Website: Official webpage

Roy Beggs Jr (born 3 July 1962) is an Ulster Unionist Party (UUP) politician, serving as a Mid and East Antrim Councillor for the Larne Lough DEA since 2023. Beggs served as a Deputy Speaker of the Northern Ireland Assembly from 2011 to 2016, and 2020 to 2022. He was a Member of the Northern Ireland Assembly (MLA) for East Antrim from 1998 to 2022.

== Political career ==
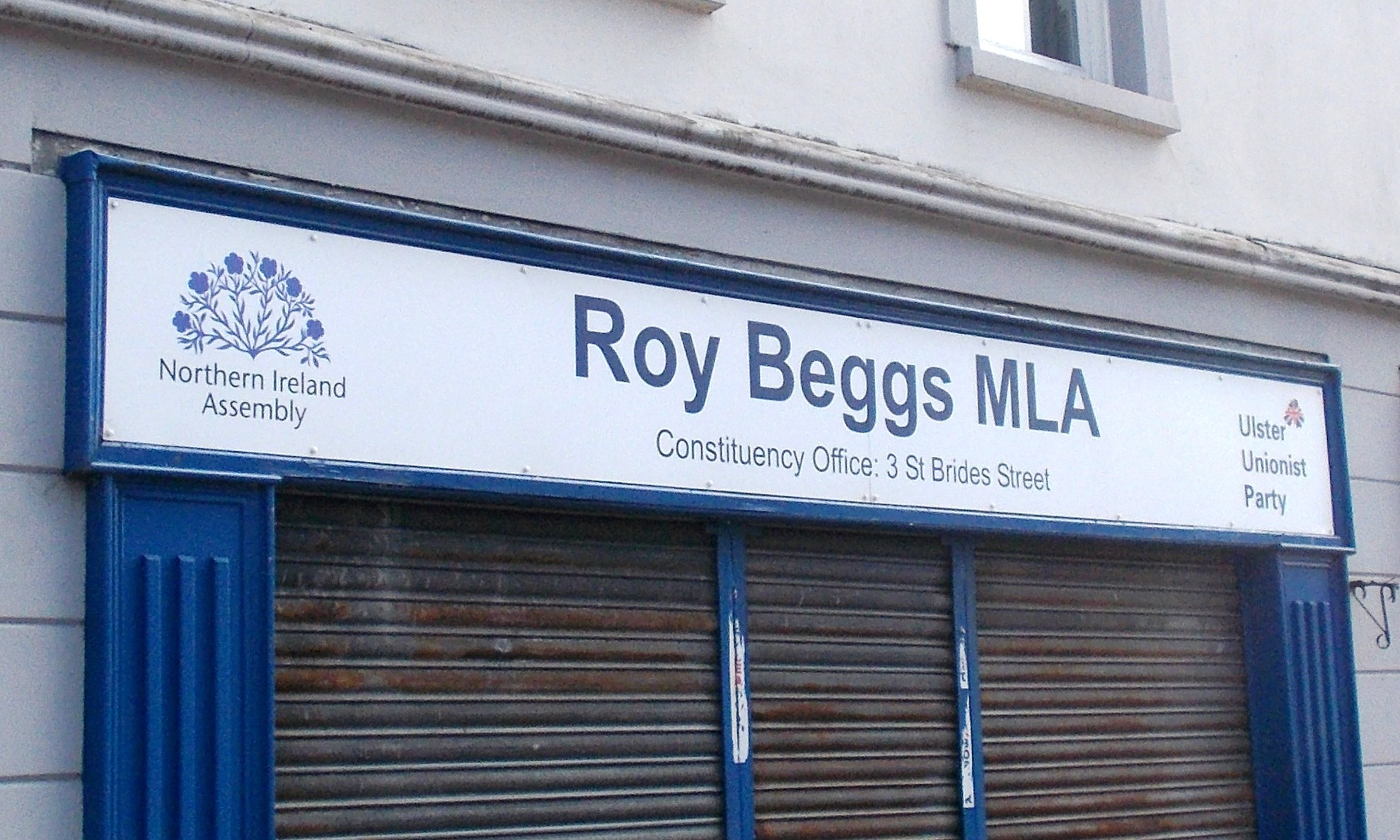
Roy Beggs MLA - Carrickfergus constituency office

Beggs was first elected to the Northern Ireland Assembly for East Antrim at the 1998 election, where he topped the poll.

At the 2001 local elections, he was elected to Carrickfergus Borough Council, representing the Knockagh District.

During this period, he had been elected as Chairman of the District Policing Partnership and vice-chairman of the Local Strategic Partnership and of the Community Safety Partnership.

Beggs was re-elected to the Assembly at the 2003 election, with 16.7% of first-preference votes.

At the 2007 Assembly election, Beggs was elected on the 12th count with 10.2% of first-preference votes.

Beggs did not seek re-election as a councillor in the 2011 local elections, but did retain his Assembly seat in the Assembly election held the same day.

Following this, Beggs was elected as a Deputy Speaker of the Northern Ireland Assembly. He served as a member of the Assembly's Social Development Committee, Public Accounts Committee, Health Committee, Environment Committee, Finance Committee, Deputy Chairman of the Agriculture Committee and Regional Development Committee. He is the Ulster Unionist Party spokesperson on Social Development.

Beggs was the Ulster Unionist candidate for East Antrim at the 2015 UK General election, where he came second to the incumbent MP, Sammy Wilson, of the Democratic Unionist Party (DUP).

He lost his seat to Danny Donnelly of the Alliance Party in the 2022 Assembly election.

In the 2023 local elections, Beggs was elected onto Mid and East Antrim Borough Council as his party’s representative for the Larne Lough District.

== Personal life ==
Beggs is the son of the politician Roy Beggs, who was the UUP Member of Parliament (MP) for East Antrim from 1983 to 2005.

In 2003, Beggs succeeded in having Irish rebel music removed from the in-flight entertainment of Aer Lingus airplanes. He complained of the "blatant promotion of militant, armed republicanism" on a music channel during a flight from Dublin to Boston after seeing that Derek Warfield had a radio channel dedicated to his music. Beggs, it was the same as "the speeches of Osama Bin Laden being played on a trans-Atlantic Arabian airline." Aer Lingus removed the material from their flights, stating: "It is something that should not have been on board and we removed it immediately we became aware of it."

Northern Ireland Assembly
| New assembly | MLA for East Antrim; 1998–2022 | Succeeded by Danny Donnelly |
| Preceded by John Dallat; David McClarty; Francie Molloy | Deputy Speaker of the Northern Ireland Assembly; 2011–2016; With: John Dallat | Succeeded by Danny Kennedy; Patsy McGlone |
