= May Beattie =

Unionist politician from Northern Ireland

Member of Mid and East Antrim Borough Council
- In office 22 May 2014 – 2 May 2019
- Preceded by: New council
- Succeeded by: Marc Collins
- Constituency: Knockagh

Member of Carrickfergus Borough Council
- In office 21 May 1997 – 22 May 2014
- Preceded by: William Haggan
- Succeeded by: Council abolished
- Constituency: Knockagh

Member of the Northern Ireland Forum for East Antrim
- In office 30 May 1996 – 25 April 1998

Personal details
- Born: 1950 (age 75–76) Carrickfergus, Northern Ireland
- Party: Traditional Unionist Voice (2019 - present)
- Other political affiliations: Democratic Unionist Party (1993 - 2019)

May Beattie (born c. 1950) is a former Northern Irish unionist politician who was a Mid and East Antrim Councillor for the Knockagh DEA from 2014 to 2019. A former member of the Democratic Unionist Party (DUP), Beattie previously represented Knockagh on the former Carrickfergus Borough Council from 1997 to 2014.

== Background ==
Born in Carrickfergus, Beattie became involved in politics by assisting the Democratic Unionist Party (DUP) during elections. She became a party member in the early 1990s, and first stood for election to Carrickfergus Borough Council at the 1993 Northern Ireland local elections.

Although unsuccessful, she was elected for the DUP in East Antrim at the Northern Ireland Forum election in 1996, and sat on the forum's health committee. She gained a seat on Carrickfergus council in 1997, and held this in 2001, 2005 and 2011. She was Mayor of Carrickfergus in 2003–4 and sits on a large number of committees. She is currently an alderman.

Beattie has also been secretary for the DUP's East Antrim branch and for the East Antrim Imperial Association, and was previously a member of the Association of Loyal Orangewomen of Ireland.

In the 2019 Northern Ireland local elections, she unsuccessfully ran as a Traditional Unionist Voice candidate in the Knockagh ward for Mid and East Antrim Borough Council

Northern Ireland Forum
| New forum | Member for East Antrim; 1996–1998 | Forum dissolved |
Civic offices
| Preceded by Eric Ferguson | Mayor of Carrickfergus; 2003–2004 | Succeeded by David Hilditch |
