= Stewart Dickson =

Northern Ireland politician (born 1950)

Stewart Dickson MLA
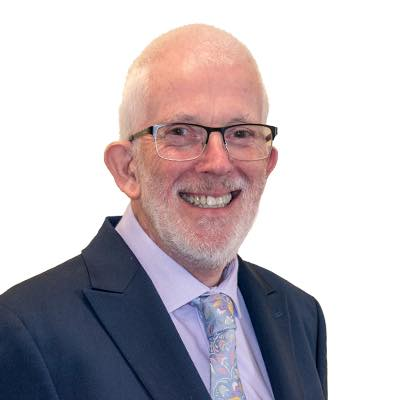

Member of the Northern Ireland Assembly for East Antrim
- Incumbent
- Assumed office 5 May 2011
- Preceded by: Seán Neeson

Member of Carrickfergus Borough Council
- In office 15 May 1985 – 22 May 2014
- Preceded by: New district
- Succeeded by: Council abolished
- Constituency: Knockagh
- In office 18 May 1977 – 20 May 1981
- Preceded by: Robert Gordon
- Succeeded by: William Haggan
- Constituency: Carrickfergus Area A

Personal details
- Born: 8 December 1950 (age 75) Carrickfergus, Northern Ireland
- Party: Alliance
- Profession: Politician
- Website: www.stewartdicksonmla.net

Stewart Dickson (born 8 December 1950) is an Alliance Party of Northern Ireland politician who has been a Member of the Northern Ireland Assembly (MLA) for East Antrim since 2011.

== Political career ==
=== Councillor (1977-1981, 1985-2011) ===
Dickson entered politics in 1977, when he was elected to Carrickfergus Borough Council representing Area A, the predecessor of the Knockagh Monument electoral area. He lost his seat to the Democratic Unionist Party in the 1981 local elections but regained it at the 1985 local elections and was re-elected at each local election until stepping down in 2014. He served as Mayor from 1992 to 1993.

=== Member of the Legislative Assembly (2011-) ===
He ran as the 2nd Alliance Party candidate in East Antrim from the 1996 Northern Ireland Forum to the 2007 Assembly Elections, alongside Seán Neeson but was not elected until the 2011 Assembly Elections; where he inherited Seán Neeson's seat following his retirement.

Dickson was re-elected at the 2016 and 2017 Assembly Elections, and was returned again in the 2022 Assembly Elections alongside his running mate Danny Donnelly - who gained a seat from the UUP's Roy Beggs.

== Personal life ==
Stewart is a Trustee of the NI Cancer Charity, OG Cancer NI having been diagnosed with Oesophageal Cancer in July 2019 and underwent major surgery later that year.

Outside political life, he is a retired member of the Northern Ireland Public Service Alliance trade union and the Greenisland Presbyterian Church where he and his wife Sandra are both Elders. He is a former long-serving member and Chair of the Boards of Governors of Carrickfergus Central and Silverstream Primary Schools. Stewart is a Winston Churchill Fellow, having completed his fellowship on: ‘How to create and sustain a small business’. He travelled to the New England States of the United States for his fellowship in 1999. Prior to his election to the NI Assembly, he worked as Arbitration Secretary at the Northern Ireland Labour Relations Agency.

Civic offices
Preceded by W. A. Haggan	Mayor of Carrickfergus; 1992–1993	Succeeded by Seán Neeson
Northern Ireland Assembly
Preceded by Seán Neeson	MLA for East Antrim; 2011 – present	Incumbent
