= Seán Neeson =

Leader of the Alliance Party of Northern Ireland (1946–2025)

Leader of the Alliance Party of Northern Ireland
- In office 1998–2001
- Deputy: Seamus Close
- Preceded by: John Alderdice
- Succeeded by: David Ford

Member of the Legislative Assembly for East Antrim
- In office 25 June 1998 – 5 May 2011
- Preceded by: New Creation
- Succeeded by: Stewart Dickson

Northern Ireland Forum Member for East Antrim
- In office 30 May 1996 – 25 April 1998
- Preceded by: New forum
- Succeeded by: Forum dissolved

Personal details
- Born: 6 February 1946
- Died: 14 June 2025 (aged 79)
- Party: Alliance
- Education: Queen's University Belfast
- Profession: Teacher
- Website: Alliance webpage

Seán Neeson (6 February 1946 – 14 June 2025) was a politician in Northern Ireland who served as leader of the Alliance Party of Northern Ireland between 1998 and 2001, and a Member of the Northern Ireland Assembly (MLA) for East Antrim from 1998 to 2011.

== Background ==
Neeson was educated at St. Malachy's College and then the Queen's University of Belfast before working as a teacher for many years. In the 1970s he joined the Alliance and in 1977 he was first elected to Carrickfergus council, serving as Mayor in 1993–94.

Neeson died on 13 June 2025, at the age of 79.

== Political career ==
In 1982 Neeson was elected to the Prior Assembly for Northern Ireland for the constituency of North Antrim. The following year he first contested the new constituency of East Antrim in the 1983 general election and subsequently fought it in the 1986 by-election called on the Anglo-Irish Agreement, the 1987 general election, the 1992 general election and the 1997 general election.

He was also elected from the constituency to the Northern Ireland Peace Forum in 1996 and the Northern Ireland Assembly in both the 1998 and 2003 elections. On several occasions Neeson was at the head of the single highest vote for Alliance in a province wide election. During this period Neeson emerged as one of the leading Alliance spokespersons, often participating in their delegation to successive talks about the future of the province.

In 1998 Neeson stood for the leadership of Alliance upon the resignation of John Alderdice. Neeson's election represented a notable geographic shift as his three predecessors (Alderdice, John Cushnahan and Oliver Napier) had all had political bases in the strip incorporating the East Belfast and North Down constituencies, whereas Neeson's political base was in County Antrim, to the north of Belfast. This was continued by Neeson's successor, David Ford, whose political base is in South Antrim.

Neeson's leadership came at a time of crisis for the Alliance. The negotiation of the Good Friday Agreement and its subsequent strong endorsement by a referendum had given Alliance much to hope for, as the party whose longstanding position on the province's future most closely matched that negotiated. However the first Assembly elections had seen Alliance win a mere 6.5% of the vote and just six Assembly seats. The decision by the party's leader, John Alderdice, to resign and take up the position of the Assembly's Speaker deprived Alliance of their most well known figure. Alliance was also in danger of losing further support to the cross-community Northern Ireland Women's Coalition. The political arrangements of the Assembly placed great stress on the need for a "majority in both communities" and a party that refused to identify as being a part of either found its influence diminished. Under Neeson's leadership Alliance sought to enhance its credentials as a party that was unambiguously in favour of the Agreement.

The first major electoral test came in the South Antrim by-election in 2000. With both the Ulster Unionist Party and the Democratic Unionist Party fielding candidates hostile to the Agreement, Alliance sought to gain votes from those unionists who supported it. In a fierce contest that was clearly always going to be between the two main unionist parties, Alliance instead found its vote squeezed.

The following year the 2001 general election saw a number of misfortunes for Alliance and Neeson personally. He failed to be selected to fight his own constituency by his local association. An attempt to negotiate an electoral pact with the Ulster Unionists, with the hope of Alliance winning the East Belfast seat broke down in negotiations. Subsequently, Alliance took the controversial decision to withdraw from several constituencies which looked likely to be fierce contests between the Ulster Unionists and/or the SDLP against the Democratic Unionists and/or Sinn Féin, instead urging voters to support the pro Agreement candidate best placed for peace. The party lost a number of council seats in the local elections held on the same day. Shortly after the election the party's deputy leader, Seamus Close, resigned citing differences over direction with the leadership. Subsequently, in September 2001 Neeson chose to resign from the leadership, being succeeded by David Ford, although he remained a member of the Assembly.

In the 2003 Assembly election he held his seat and was subsequently selected by his local association to fight East Antrim in the 2005 general election. Having increased the party's vote at that election, Neeson was re-elected to the Assembly comfortably at the 2007 election, on a party vote share of 16%.

Seán Neeson stepped down from the assembly to spend more time with his family, saying "It has been an honour and a privilege to serve the people of East Antrim at the Assembly. It has been very rewarding and at time extremely challenging trying to build peace in Northern Ireland. I want to pay tribute to all those who, during the darkest days of the Troubles, worked hard from the centre ground to bring this society forward towards a peaceful and shared future."

Northern Ireland Assembly (1982)
New assembly	MPA for North Antrim; 1982–1986	Assembly abolished
Northern Ireland Forum
New forum	Member for East Antrim; 1996–1998	Forum dissolved
Northern Ireland Assembly
New assembly	MLA for Antrim East; 1998–2011	Succeeded by Stewart Dickson
Civic offices
Preceded by Stewart Dickson	Mayor of Carrickfergus; 1993–1994	Succeeded by J. Crowe
Party political offices
Preceded by John Alderdice	Leader of the Alliance Party (NI); 1998–2001	Succeeded by David Ford
