= David Hilditch =

Northern Irish politician (1963–2023)

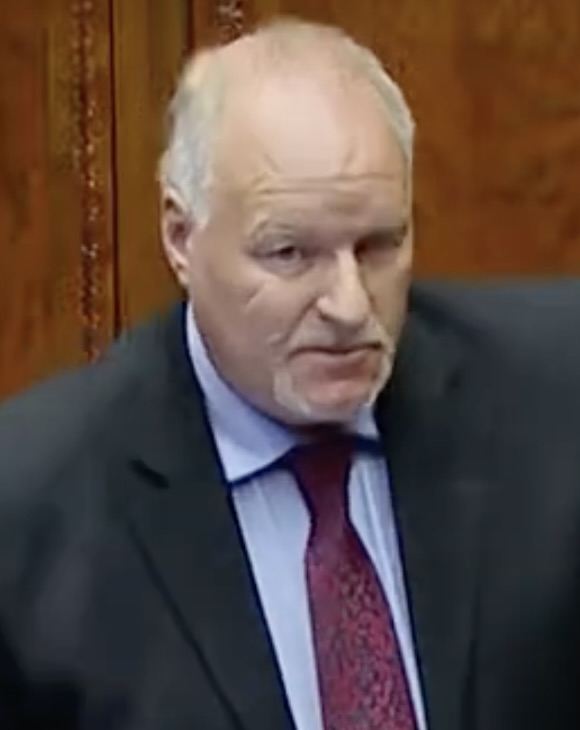
- Hilditch in 2015

Member of the Northern Ireland Assembly for Antrim East
- In office 25 June 1998 – 8 September 2023
- Preceded by: New creation
- Succeeded by: Cheryl Brownlee

Member of Carrickfergus Borough Council
- In office 1991–2013
- Preceded by: Andrew Blair
- Succeeded by: Fred Cobain
- Constituency: Carrick Castle

Personal details
- Born: 23 July 1963 Carrickfergus, Northern Ireland
- Died: 5 November 2023 (aged 60)
- Party: Democratic Unionist Party
- Website: Hilditich DUP

David Hilditch (23 July 1963 – 5 November 2023) was a Democratic Unionist Party (DUP) politician who was a Member of the Northern Ireland Assembly (MLA) for East Antrim from 1998 to 2023.

== Biography ==
David Hilditch was born in Carrickfergus on 23 July 1963. He previously worked in the construction industry and for Royal Mail between 1987 and 1998. In February 1997 he was awarded the RUC Bravery Award following a post office robbery. He was first elected to Carrickfergus Borough Council in 1991. He was elected as deputy mayor in 1995 and elected to mayor in 1997 and also served as mayor from 2004 to 2008.

Hilditch was elected to the Northern Ireland Assembly (MLA) for East Antrim in 1998 and again in both 2003 and 2007. He was one of the top questioners in the 1998–2003 Assembly, serving on the Employment and Learning Committee and Culture Arts and Leisure Committee. He was the vice-chair of the Social Development Committee, and was a member of the Standards and Privileges Committee and the Employment and Learning Committee. He was also secretary of Carrick Rangers Football club. At the 2017 Assembly election, he was re-elected on the first count. At the 2022 Assembly election, he was elected on the fifth count.

Hilditch was a member of the Apprentice Boys. His son, Stuart, died on 10 September 2019 after a three-year battle with multiple myeloma.

He resigned from the Assembly in September 2023, due to ill health.

Hilditch died from cancer on 5 November 2023, at the age of 60.

Civic offices
Preceded by S. Y. McCamley	Mayor of Carrickfergus; 1997–1998	Succeeded by Janet Crampsey
Preceded by May Beattie	Mayor of Carrickfergus; 2004–2008	Succeeded by Patricia McKinney
Northern Ireland Assembly
New assembly	MLA for Antrim East; 1998–2023	Vacant
