= Carrickfergus Borough Council =

Former district council in Northern Ireland

Coordinates: 54.721°N 5.791°W

Carrickfergus Borough (historical)
- Area: 82 km^{2} (32 sq mi)
- Country: Northern Ireland
- Sovereign state: United Kingdom
- Councillors: MPs Sammy Wilson (DUP)

Map of the borough's DEAs from 1993 to 2014

Carrickfergus Borough Council was a district council in County Antrim in Northern Ireland. It merged with Ballymena Borough Council and Larne Borough Council in May 2015 under local government reorganisation in Northern Ireland to become Mid and East Antrim Borough Council.

The council was based at Carrickfergus Town Hall and the council administered the town, on the north shore of Belfast Lough, and surrounding area, which extended from Greenisland in the south-west to Whitehead in the east. The borough was 32 square miles (83 km^{2}), with a population of just over 39,000.

Together with the neighbouring district of Larne and small parts of Newtownabbey and Moyle, it formed the East Antrim constituency for elections to the Westminster Parliament and Northern Ireland Assembly.

== Mayors of Carrickfergus ==
=== Mayors 1523–1842 ===
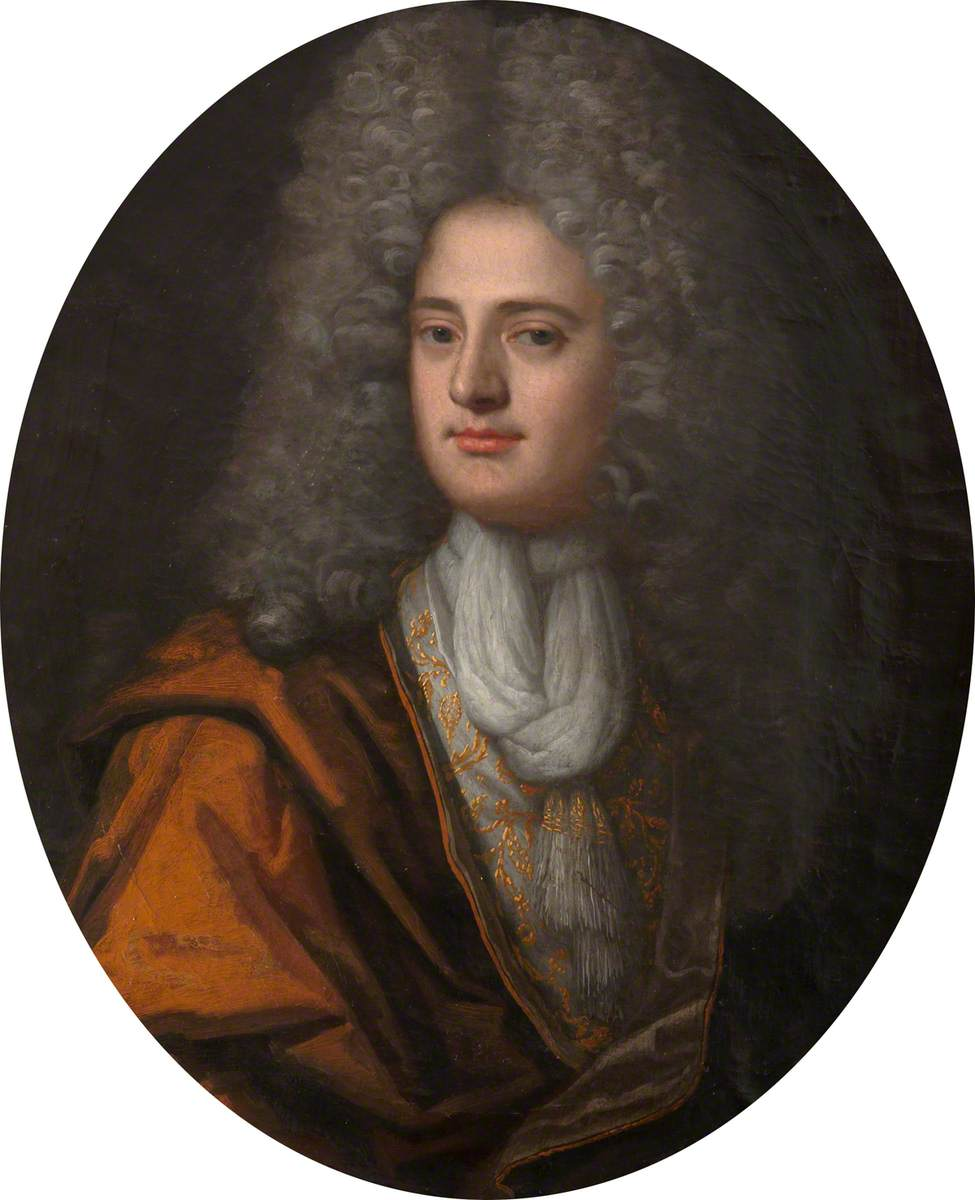
Ezekiel Davys Wilson c. 1720, first of several mayors of the name

The mayors of the municipal borough of Carrickfergus prior to its abolition under the Municipal Corporations (Ireland) Act 1840:

- 1523 William Fythe
- 1568–1569 Thomas Stephenson
- 1569–1570 John Teade
- 1570–1571 Rychard Sendall
- 1571–1572 Edward Brown
- 1572–1573 Captain William Piers
- 1573–1574 Thomas Stephenson
- 1574–1575 William Piers, jnr
- 1575–1576 William Piers, jnr
- 1576–1577 William Dobbin
- 1577–1578 William Piers, jnr
- 1578–1579 Nicholas Wills
- 1579–1580 Captain Thomas Sackforde
- 1580–1581 William Dobbin
- 1581–1582 Captain Thomas Sackforde died, succeeded by Nicholas Wills
- 1582–1583 Captain William Piers
- 1583–1584 William Dobbin
- 1584–1585 Captain Nicholas Dawtrey
- 1585–1586 William Dobbin
- 1586–1587 Thomas Stephenson
- 1587–1588 John Savadge
- 1588–1589 William Dobbin
- 1589–1590 Charles Eggerton
- 1590–1591 Matthew Jones
- 1591–1592 Humphrey Johnston
- 1592–1593 John Dallwaye
- 1593–1594 Nicholas Wills died, succeeded by M. Savadge
- 1594–1595 John Savadge
- 1595–1596 Thomas Stephenson
- 1596–1597 Charles Eggerton
- 1597–1598 Humphrey Johnston
- 1598–1599 John Savadge
- 1599–1600 Humphrey Johnston
- 1600–1601 John Dallwaye
- 1601–1602 Gregorie Norton
- 1602–1603 John Hooper
- 1603–1604 Moyses Hill
- 1604–1605 John Savadge
- 1605–1606 James Byrte
- 1606–1607 James Byrte (Thomas Wytter deputy)
- 1607–1608 Thomas Wytter
- 1608–1609 Sir Foulke Conway
- 1609–1610 Sir Foulke Conway
- 1610–1611 Rychard Tanffe
- 1611–1612 Mychaell Whyte
- 1612–1613 Robert Lyndon
- 1613–1614 Thomas Cooper
- 1614–1615 Captain Hercules Langford
- 1615–1616 Humphrey Johnston
- 1616–1617 Captain Humphrey Norton
- 1617–1618 Sir Moyses Hill
- 1618–1619 Thomas Witter died, succeeded by Mychaell Whyte
- 1619–1620 Sir Hugh Clotworthy
- 1620–1621 James Byrte
- 1621–1622 Thomas Cooper
- 1622–1623 Mychael Whyte died, succeeded by William Storr
- 1623–1624 Sir Hercules Langford
- 1624–1625 Sir Hercules Langford
- 1625–1626 Thomas Kirkpatrick
- 1626–1627 Anthony Dobbin
- 1627–1628 Inghrame Horsman died, succeeded by Mathewe Johnston
- 1628–1629 Mathewe Johnston
- 1629–1630 Sir Moyses Hill
- 1630–1631 James Byrte
- 1631–1632 Sir Hercules Langford
- 1632–1633 Cornelius Hermans died, succeeded by Mathewe Johnston
- 1633–1634 Thomas Kirkpatrick
- 1634–1635 William Penrye
- 1635–1636 Thomas Whitager
- 1636–1637 Richard Spearpoynt
- 1637–1638 Richard Spearpoynt
- 1638–1639 Roger Lyndon
- 1639–1640 Sir Roger Langford
- 1640–1641 John Davies
- 1641–1642 John Davies
- 1642–1643 Captain Roger Lyndone
- 1643–1644 Captain Roger Lyndone
- 1644–1645 Thomas Kirkpatrick
- 1645–1646 Mathewe Johnston
- 1646–1647 Richard Spearpoynt
- 1647–1648 Richard Spearpoynt
- 1648–1649 Captain Roger Lyndone
- 1649–1650 William Happer
- 1650–1651 William Happer
- 1651–1652 Captain Roger Lyndone
- 1652–1653 Captain John Dallway
- 1653–1654 Captain Roger Lyndone
- 1654–1655 John Bullworthy
- 1655–1656 John Bullworthy
- 1656–1657 John Orpin
- 1657–1658 John Orpin
- 1658–1659 Joseph Harris
- 1659–1660 John Davies
- 1660–1661 John Dallway, Esq
- 1661–1662 Captain John Dallway
- 1662–1663 James Dobbin
- 1663–1664 Hercules Davies
- 1664–1665 John Dallway, Esq
- 1665–1666 Anthony Hall
- 1666–1667 William Dobbin
- 1667–1668 Edmond Davies
- 1668–1669 Robert Welsh
- 1669–1670 Anthony Horsman
- 1670–1671 Anthony Horsman
- 1671–1672 Richard Dobbs
- 1672–1673 Henry Davies (Edmond Davies, deputy)
- 1673–1674 William Hill (Anthony Horsman, deputy)
- 1674–1675 William Hill (Anthony Horsman, deputy)
- 1675–1676 John Byrte
- 1676–1677 John Byrte
- 1677–1678 Soloman Faith
- 1678–1679 Ezekell Davies
- 1679–1680 Hercules Davies
- 1680–1681 Henry Clements
- 1681–1682 Samuel Webby
- 1682–1683 Richard Dobbs
- 1683–1684 Andrew Willoughby
- 1684–1685 Edmond Davies
- 1685–1686 Arthur Chichester, 3rd Earl of Donegall (Solomon Faith, deputy)
- 1686–1687 John Davies
- 1687–1688 Richard Dobbs
- 1688–1689 Richard Dobbs
- 1689–1690 Richard Dobbs
- 1690–1691 Henry Davys
- 1691–1692 Andrew Clements
- 1692–1693 Marmaduke Newton
- 1693–1694 Marmaduke Newton
- 1694–1695 Richard Horsman
- 1695–1696 Samuel Davys
- 1696–1697 Henry Clements died, succeeded by Samuel Davys
- 1697–1698 Hon. John E. Chichester
- 1698–1699 Henry Davys
- 1699–1700 Sir Thomas Dancer
- 1700–1701 Cornelius Crymble
- 1701–1702 Captain John Davys (Samuel Davys, deputy)
- 1702–1703 Andrew Clements (Samuel Davys, deputy)
- 1703–1704 Andrew Clements (Cornelius Crymble, deputy)
- 1704–1705 Edward Clements
- 1705–1706 Edward Clements
- 1706–1707 Richard Horsman
- 1707–1708 Richard Horsman
- 1708–1709 Cornelius Crymble
- 1709–1710 Cornelius Crymble
- 1710–1711 Edward Clements
- 1711–1712 John Chaplin
- 1712–1713 Samuel Davys
- 1713–1714 Samuel Davys
- 1714–1715 John Davys, jnr (Samuel Davys, deputy)
- 1715–1716 Andrew Clements (Samuel Davys, deputy)
- 1716–1717 Francis Ellis
- 1717–1718 Francis Ellis
- 1718–1719 John Chaplin
- 1719–1720 Francis Clements (Francis Ellis, deputy)
- 1720–1721 Arthur Dobbs (Francis Ellis, deputy)
- 1721–1722 John Lyndon (John Chaplin, deputy)
- 1722–1723 Ezekiel Davys Wilson
- 1723–1724 Anthony Horsman
- 1724–1725 Rigby Dobbin (John Chaplin and Anthony Horsman, deputies)
- 1725–1726 Valentine Jones (Ezekiel Davys Wilson, deputy)
- 1726–1727 Francis Ellis
- 1727–1728 Francis Clements
- 1728–1729 Arthur Dobbs (Francis Clements, deputy)
- 1729–1730 Francis Lord Conway (Francis Clements, deputy)
- 1730–1731 John Lyndon (Francis Clements, deputy)
- 1731–1732 Francis Ellis (Francis Clements, deputy)
- 1732–1733 Arthur Dobbs (George Spaight, deputy)
- 1733–1734 Willoughby Chaplin
- 1734–1735 George Spaight
- 1735–1736 Willoughby Chaplin
- 1736–1737 Francis Ellis
- 1737–1738 Henry Ellis
- 1738–1739 George Spaight
- 1739–1740 Henry Gill
- 1740–1741 Francis Clements (George Spaight, deputy)
- 1741–1742 Arthur Dobbs
- 1742–1743 Willoughby Chaplin
- 1743–1744 Willoughby Chaplin
- 1744–1745 Willoughby Chaplin
- 1745–1746 Willoughby Chaplin
- 1746–1747 Willoughby Chaplin
- 1747–1748 Willoughby Chaplin
- 1748–1749 Edward Brice
- 1749–1750 Willoughby Chaplin
- 1750–1751 Willoughby Chaplin
- 1751–1752 Willoughby Chaplin
- 1752–1753 Willoughby Chaplin
- 1753–1754 Willoughby Chaplin (continued; Valentine Jones lacked documentation for swearing in)
- 1754–1755 Henry Ellis
- 1755–1756 Henry Ellis (continued; Rt. Hon. Arthur Chichester, 4th Earl of Donegall not appearing)
- 1756–1757 Henry Ellis (continued; Rt. Hon. Arthur Chichester, 4th Earl of Donegall not appearing)
- 1757–1758 Willoughby Chaplin ousted; then Henry Ellis
- 1758–1759 Hill Wilson
- 1759–1760 Francis Price (William Chaplin, deputy)
- 1760–1761 Francis Price (continued; Rt. Hon. Arthur Chichester, 5th Earl of Donegall not appearing) (William Chaplin, deputy)
- 1761–1762 Francis Price (William Chaplin, deputy)
- 1762–1763 Francis Price (William Chaplin, deputy)
- 1763–1764 Francis Price (William Chaplin, deputy)
- 1764–1765 Francis Price (William Chaplin, deputy)
- 1765–1766 Rt. Hon. Arthur Chichester, 5th Earl of Donegall
- 1766–1767 Rt. Hon. Arthur Chichester, 5th Earl of Donegall (Henry Ellis, deputy)
- 1767–1768 Rt. Hon. Arthur Chichester, 5th Earl of Donegall (Ezekiel Davys Wilson, deputy)
- 1768–1769 Rt. Hon. Arthur Chichester, 5th Earl of Donegall (William Chaplin, deputy)
- 1769–1770 Ezekiel Davys Wilson
- 1770–1771 Hercules Ellis
- 1771–1772 Kenneth A. Price
- 1772–1773 Ezekiel Davys Wilson
- 1773–1774 Henry Ellis
- 1774–1775 Hercules Ellis
- 1775–1776 Ezekiel Davys Wilson
- 1776–1777 Edward Price Dobbs
- 1777–1778 Ezekiel Davys Wilson
- 1778–1779 Edward Price Dobbs
- 1779–1780 Ezekiel Davys Wilson
- 1780–1781 William Kirk
- 1781–1782 Ezekiel Davys Wilson
- 1782–1783 William Kirk
- 1783–1784 Ezekiel Davys Wilson
- 1784–1785 William Kirk
- 1785–1786 Ezekiel Davys Wilson
- 1786–1787 William Kirk
- 1787–1788 Ezekiel Davys Wilson
- 1788–1789 Sir William Kirk
- 1789–1790 Ezekiel Davys Wilson
- 1790–1791 Sir William Kirk
- 1791–1792 Ezekiel Davys Wilson
- 1792–1793 Sir William Kirk
- 1793–1794 Ezekiel Davys Wilson
- 1794–1795 Sir William Kirk
- 1795–1796 Ezekiel Davys Wilson
- 1796–1797 Sir William Kirk
- 1797–1798 Ezekiel Davys Wilson
- 1798–1799 Sir William Kirk
- 1799–1800 Ezekiel Davys Wilson
- 1800–1801 Sir William Kirk
- 1801–1802 Ezekiel Davys Wilson
- 1802–1803 Sir William Kirk
- 1803–1804 George Chichester, 2nd Marquess of Donegall (Sir William Kirk, deputy)
- 1804–1805 Sir William Kirk
- 1805–1806 George Chichester, 2nd Marquess of Donegall (Sir William Kirk, deputy)
- 1806–1807 Noah Dalway
- 1807–1808 Sir William Kirk
- 1808–1809 Ezekiel Davys Wilson
- 1809–1810 Noah Dalway
- 1810–1811 Ezekiel Davys Wilson
- 1811–1812 Noah Dalway (Sir William Kirk, deputy)
- 1812–1813 Ezekiel D Wilson
- 1813–1814 George Chichester, 2nd Marquess of Donegall (Sir William Kirk, deputy)
- 1814–1815 Sir William Kirk
- 1815–1816 George Chichester, 2nd Marquess of Donegall (Sir William Kirk, deputy)
- 1816–1817 Noah Dalway (Sir William Kirk, deputy)
- 1817–1818 George Chichester, 2nd Marquess of Donegall (Sir William Kirk, deputy)
- 1818–1819 Rev. Richard Dobbs
- 1819–1820 Ezekiel Davys Wilson
- 1820–1821 Rev. Richard Dobbs
- 1821–1822 George Chichester, 2nd Marquess of Donegall (Rev. Richard Dobbs, deputy)
- 1822–1823 Lord Belfast (Rev. Richard Dobbs, deputy)
- 1823–1824 George Chichester, 2nd Marquess of Donegall (Rev. Richard Dobbs, deputy)
- 1824–1825 Sir Arthur Chichester, 1st Baronet (Rev. Richard Dobbs, deputy)
- 1825–1826 Rev. Edward Chichester (Rev. John Dobbs, deputy)
- 1826–1827 George Chichester, 2nd Marquess of Donegall (Rev. John Dobbs, deputy)
- 1827–1828 Sir Arthur Chichester, 1st Baronet
- 1828–1829 Sir Arthur Chichester, 1st Baronet (Rev. Samuel Smith dep from March 1829)
- 1829–1830 George Chichester, 2nd Marquess of Donegall
- 1830–1831 George Chichester, 2nd Marquess of Donegall (held over, Rev. John Dobbs elected but not appearing) (Rev. Lord Edward Chichester, deputy)
- 1831–1832 George Chichester, 2nd Marquess of Donegall (held over, Thomas B. Adair elected but not appearing)
- 1832–1833 Thomas B. Adair
- 1833–1834 Peter Kirk
- 1834–1835 Peter Kirk (held over, Rev. John Dobbs elected but not appearing)
- 1835–1836 Peter Kirk (held over)
- 1836–1837 Peter Kirk (held over; Henry Adair, deputy)
- 1837–1838 Peter Kirk (held over; Henry Adair, deputy)
- 1838–1839 Marriott Dalway
- 1839–1840 Marriott Dalway
- 1840–1841 Marriott Dalway
- 1841–1842 Marriott Dalway

=== Mayors Since 1849 ===
List of mayors of Carrickfergus Borough Council since 1949

George VI

- 1949–1951 Thomas John Patterson
- 1951–1952 William McCullough

Elizabeth II

- 1952–1973 Thomas John Patterson
- 1973–1978 Hugh McLean
- 1978–1979 Samuel Murphy
- 1979–1981 Samuel Simms
- 1981–1983 Ken McFaul
- 1983–1984 Samuel Murphy
- 1984–1986 Charles Johnston
- 1986–1990 Jim Brown
- 1990–1991 Charles Johnston
- 1991–1992 W. A. Haggan
- 1992–1993 Stewart Dickson
- 1993–1994 Sean Neeson
- 1994–1995 J. Crowe
- 1995–1996 W. S. Hamilton
- 1996–1997 S. Y. McCamley
- 1997–1998 David Hilditch
- 1998–1999 B. J. Crampsey (First Woman Mayor)
- 1999–2000 T. Creighton
- 2000–2001 Jim Brown
- 2001–2002 Billy Ashe
- 2002–2003 Eric Ferguson
- 2003–2004 May Beattie (Second Woman Mayor)
- 2004–2008 David Hilditch
- 2008–2010 Patricia McKinney (Third Woman Mayor)
- 2010–2012 Jim McClurg
- 2012–2014 Billy Ashe
- 2014–2015 Charles Johnston (Last Mayor of Carrickfergus Borough Council)
- Source: Carrickfergus Borough Council

List of Honorary Freemen of Carrickfergus Borough Council since 1949

- Alderman William McCullough JP 6 October 1952
- Alderman Walter McKeown MBE

15 October 1956

- Alderman Thomas John Patterson OBE JP 7 March 1960
- Councillor Hugh McLean OBE 16 January 1978
- Samuel Murphy MBE JP 4 November 1986
- Samuel Simms 4 November 1986
- Joan Catherine Tomlin 4 November 1986
- The Ulster Defence Regiment 1 October 1988
- The Royal Irish Regiment 17 April 1993
- Raymond Boyd ACIS 12 April 2001
- William Hume 12 April 2001
- Charles Johnston 12 April 2001
- Terence Murtagh JP 12 April 2001
- The Northern Ireland Fire & Rescue Service 4 August 2006
- Source: [PDF] CBC Compass 18 Spring/Summer 09 v4 Carrickfergus Borough

== Population ==
The area covered by Carrickfergus Borough Council had a population of 39,114 residents according to the 2011 Northern Ireland census.

== See also ==
- High Sheriff of Carrickfergus
- Local government in Northern Ireland
