= 1977 Antrim Borough Council election =

Local government election in Northern Ireland

← 1973	18 May 1977	1981 →

All 15 seats to Antrim Borough Council 8 seats needed for a majority
	First party	Second party	Third party
Party	UUP	DUP	Alliance
Seats won	8	3	2
Seat change	▼1	▲2	0
	Fourth party	Fifth party	Sixth party
Party	Independent	Ind. Nationalist	Vanguard
Seats won	1	1	0
Seat change	0	0	▼1

Elections to Antrim Borough Council were held on 18 May 1977 on the same day as the other Northern Irish local government elections. The election used three district electoral areas to elect a total of 15 councillors.

== Election results ==
Antrim Borough Council Election Result 1977
Party	Seats	Gains	Losses	Net gain/loss	Seats %	Votes %	Votes	+/−
UUP	8	0	1	▼1	53.3	38.6	4,543	▼10.8
DUP	3	2	0	▲2	20.0	18.4	2,164	▲13.1
Alliance	2	0	0	0	13.3	16.9	1,981	▲0.8
Independent	1	0	0	0	6.7	16.0	1,885	▲1.4
Ind. Nationalist	1	0	0	0	6.7	5.8	679	▲1.7
Vanguard	0	0	1	▼1	0.0	2.5	299	▼3.6
British Ulster Dominion Party	0	0	0	0	0.0	1.7	205	New

Note: "Votes" are the first preference votes.

== Districts summary ==
Results of the Antrim Borough Council election, 1977 by district
Ward	%	Cllrs	%	Cllrs	%	Cllrs	%	Cllrs	Total Cllrs
Ward	UUP		DUP		Alliance		Others		Total Cllrs
Area A	30.1	2	20.2	1	5.3	0	44.2	2	5
Area B	60.8	3	17.0	1	22.2	1	0.0	0	5
Area C	32.9	3	17.6	1	24.1	1	25.4	0	5
Total	38.6	8	18.4	3	16.9	2	26.1	2	15

== Districts results ==
=== Area A ===
1973: 2 x UUP, 1 x DUP, 1 x Independent, 1 x Independent Nationalist
1977: 2 x UUP, 1 x DUP, 1 x Independent, 1 x Independent Nationalist
1973-1977 Change: No change

Antrim Area A - 5 seats
Party	Candidate	FPv%	Count							
Party	Candidate	FPv%	1	2	3	4	5	6	7	8
UUP	James Graham*	24.03%	1,018							
Ind. Nationalist	John Heffron*	16.03%	679	680.2	682.5	761.5				
DUP	Stewart Dunlop*	11.78%	499	538.6	549.1	556.1	556.1	904.1		
UUP	Samuel Getty	3.97%	168	351	468	525.7	526.3	548.8	742.32	
Independent	Gerard Berry	12.79%	542	542	542	593.3	677.3	677.6	678.42	697.42
Independent	James Marrion	8.61%	365	365.9	367.2	378.2	594.5	594.5	596.96	631.92
DUP	James Brown	8.50%	360	374.4	379.9	383.5	383.5			
Independent	John McKeever	6.84%	290	290.6	290.9	311.8				
Alliance	Patrick Gribben	5.31%	225	229.2	237.8					
UUP	Moira Marshall	2.15%	91	150.1						
Electorate: 6,140 Valid: 4,237 (69.01%) Spoilt: 163 Quota: 707 Turnout: 4,400 (71.66%)

=== Area B ===
1973: 4 x UUP, 1 x Alliance
1977: 3 x UUP, 1 x DUP, 1 x Alliance
1973-1977 Change: DUP gain from UUP

Antrim Area B - 5 seats
Party	Candidate	FPv%	Count					
Party	Candidate	FPv%	1	2	3	4	5	6
Alliance	John McCourt*	13.88%	394	397	605			
UUP	James Cunningham	15.71%	446	455	460	502		
UUP	Edgar Wallace*	16.17%	459	467	470	497		
UUP	George Dundas*	10.78%	306	308	313	337	357.25	488.25
DUP	Allister Lucas	9.37%	266	448	453	459	459	476
UUP	William Jones	9.51%	270	275	279	291	294	399
UUP	Alexander Wilson*	8.63%	245	247	247	265	269.5	
Alliance	George Luke	8.31%	236	237				
DUP	John Patterson	7.64%	217					
Electorate: 5,907 Valid: 2,839 (48.06%) Spoilt: 127 Quota: 474 Turnout: 2,966 (50.21%)

=== Area C ===
1973: 3 x UUP, 1 x Alliance, 1 x Vanguard
1977: 2 x UUP, 2 x Alliance, 1 x DUP
1973-1977 Change: DUP gain from Vanguard

Antrim Area C - 5 seats
Party	Candidate	FPv%	Count											
Party	Candidate	FPv%	1	2	3	4	5	6	7	8	9	10	11	12
Alliance	Charles Kinahan	17.63%	825											
UUP	Jack Allen*	17.12%	801											
DUP	Samuel Dunlop	11.54%	540	540.15	540.35	544.35	544.35	545.35	612.37	865.37				
UUP	Samuel McCombe*	8.89%	416	416.85	420.91	422.96	423.96	426.98	453.02	468.02	490.1	575.14	612.26	743.88
UUP	James Craig*	6.90%	323	323.95	333.11	334.11	334.11	334.18	352.18	364.18	383.5	427.76	464.27	643.54
Independent	Eileen Lagan	3.60%	219	220.05	220.09	220.09	272.29	368.56	370.56	370.61	370.61	415.71	567.91	577.57
Vanguard	James Clarke*	6.39%	299	299.4	301.06	302.06	302.06	302.06	337.06	346.1	377.84	414.75	439.87	
Alliance	Florence McLernon	6.43%	301	335.25	335.39	335.44	337.64	345.24	351.24	352.29	353.21	402.86		
Independent	Peter Neish	5.79%	271	272.05	272.43	272.43	277.43	300.58	310.63	313.68	322.88			
DUP	William McCormick	6.03%	282	282.2	282.24	282.24	282.24	283.24	299.24					
Dominion Party	David Gregg	2.91%	136	136.05	136.11	196.11	197.11	197.11						
Independent	Liam McCabe	2.48%	116	116.9	116.94	116.99	135.13							
Independent	Martin Hanna	1.75%	82	82.55	82.59	82.59								
Dominion Party	Samuel Ferson	1.47%	69	69.15	69.15									
Electorate: 12,381 Valid: 4,680 (37.80%) Spoilt: 217 Quota: 781 Turnout: 4,897 (39.55%)
