= Antrim Area C =

District electoral areas in Antrim, Northern Ireland

Antrim Area C was one of the three district electoral areas in Antrim, Northern Ireland which existed from 1973 to 1985. The district elected five members to Antrim Borough Council and formed part of the South Antrim constituencies for the Northern Ireland Assembly and UK Parliament.

It was created for the 1973 local elections, and contained the wards of Balloo, Ballycraigy, Massereene, Parkhall and Stiles. It was abolished for the 1985 local elections and replaced with the Antrim Town DEA.

== Councillors ==
Election	Councillor (Party)	Councillor (Party)	Councillor (Party)	Councillor (Party)	Councillor (Party)
1981	Jack Allen (UUP)	Paddy Marks (UUP)	Charles Quinn (DUP)	Samuel Dunlop (DUP)	Michael Donoghue (Alliance)
1977	Jack Allen (UUP)	James Craig (UUP)	Samuel McCombe (UUP)	Samuel Dunlop (DUP)	Charles Kinahan (Alliance)
1973	Jack Allen (UUP)	James Craig (UUP)	Samuel McCombe (UUP)	James Clarke (Vanguard)	Michael O'Donoghue (Alliance)

== 1981 Election ==
1977: 3 x UUP, 1 x DUP, 1 x Alliance

1981: 2 x UUP, 2 x DUP, 1 x Alliance

1977-1981 Change: DUP gain from UUP

Antrim Area C - 5 seats
Party	Candidate	FPv%	Count								
Party	Candidate	FPv%	1	2	3	4	5	6	7	8	9
DUP	Samuel Dunlop*	25.47%	1,719								
UUP	Paddy Marks	17.52%	1,182								
DUP	Charles Quinn	9.11%	615	1,120.58	1,124.14	1,156.14					
UUP	Jack Allen*	14.24%	961	999.76	1,019.44	1,151.44					
Alliance	Michael Donoghue	7.87%	531	533.04	533.6	537.28	538.28	539.93	581.61	710.61	993.61
Alliance	Charles Kinahan*	6.89%	465	468.74	470.22	490.16	491.16	498.31	540.23	657.34	835.34
Independent Labour	John Gibbons	8.33%	562	565.4	565.52	566.04	567.04	569.24	612.96	643.47	
Alliance	Mary Wallace	3.94%	266	268.04	268.76	278.06	280.06	288.86	324.41		
Independent Labour	Philip Henry	3.60%	243	251.16	251.88	257.5	260.5	267.1			
UUP	Hugh Johnston	3.02%	204	219.3	238.66						
Electorate: 14,454 Valid: 6,748 (46.69%) Spoilt: 236 Quota: 1,125 Turnout: 6,984 (48.32%)

== 1977 Election ==
1973: 3 x UUP, 1 x Alliance, 1 x Vanguard

1977: 2 x UUP, 2 x Alliance, 1 x DUP

1973-1977 Change: DUP gain from Vanguard

Antrim Area C - 5 seats
Party	Candidate	FPv%	Count											
Party	Candidate	FPv%	1	2	3	4	5	6	7	8	9	10	11	12
Alliance	Charles Kinahan	17.63%	825											
UUP	Jack Allen*	17.12%	801											
DUP	Samuel Dunlop	11.54%	540	540.15	540.35	544.35	544.35	545.35	612.37	865.37				
UUP	Samuel McCombe*	8.89%	416	416.85	420.91	422.96	423.96	426.98	453.02	468.02	490.1	575.14	612.26	743.88
UUP	James Craig*	6.90%	323	323.95	333.11	334.11	334.11	334.18	352.18	364.18	383.5	427.76	464.27	643.54
Independent	Eileen Lagan	3.60%	219	220.05	220.09	220.09	272.29	368.56	370.56	370.61	370.61	415.71	567.91	577.57
Vanguard	James Clarke*	6.39%	299	299.4	301.06	302.06	302.06	302.06	337.06	346.1	377.84	414.75	439.87	
Alliance	Florence McLernon	6.43%	301	335.25	335.39	335.44	337.64	345.24	351.24	352.29	353.21	402.86		
Independent	Peter Neish	5.79%	271	272.05	272.43	272.43	277.43	300.58	310.63	313.68	322.88			
DUP	William McCormick	6.03%	282	282.2	282.24	282.24	282.24	283.24	299.24					
Dominion Party	David Gregg	2.91%	136	136.05	136.11	196.11	197.11	197.11						
Independent	Liam McCabe	2.48%	116	116.9	116.94	116.99	135.13							
Independent	Martin Hanna	1.75%	82	82.55	82.59	82.59								
Dominion Party	Samuel Ferson	1.47%	69	69.15	69.15									
Electorate: 12,381 Valid: 4,680 (37.80%) Spoilt: 217 Quota: 781 Turnout: 4,897 (39.55%)

== 1973 Election ==
1973: 3 x UUP, 1 x Alliance, 1 x Vanguard

Antrim Area C - 5 seats
Party	Candidate	FPv%	Count									
Party	Candidate	FPv%	1	2	3	4	5	6	7	8	9	10
Alliance	Michael O'Donoghue	17.28%	939									
UUP	Samuel McCombe	14.89%	809	809.18	810.24	874.24	876.24	899.27	908.27			
Vanguard	James Clarke	9.85%	535	535.06	536.06	538.06	541.06	566.06	878.06	936.06		
UUP	James Craig	10.01%	544	544.06	547.06	572.06	573.09	600.09	609.09	694.18	700.18	947.21
UUP	Jack Allen	8.63%	469	469.15	470.27	504.27	507.3	548.3	553.3	600.36	613.11	895.92
Alliance	William Gawn	3.28%	178	182.41	298.83	300.83	479.72	513.14	514.14	696.4	699.4	733.43
UUP	William Clarke	9.33%	507	507.06	510.09	522.09	525.09	541.09	544.09	599.12	607.37	
Independent	Thomas Simpson	7.31%	397	398.29	399.5	412.5	418.65	490.86	497.86			
Vanguard	David McCreight	6.09%	331	331	331	336	337	349				
Independent	Peter Neish	4.38%	238	238.39	240.48	257.48	256.69					
Alliance	Charlie Greer	3.11%	169	172.36	203.49	206.49						
UUP	R. W. Rutherford-Browne	3.20%	174	174	176							
Alliance	Alan Finlay	2.65%	144	162.06								
Electorate: 9,206 Valid: 5,434 (59.03%) Spoilt: 89 Quota: 906 Turnout: 5,523 (59.99%)
