= 1981 Antrim Borough Council election =

Local government election in Northern Ireland

| ← 1977 | 20 May 1981 | 1985 → |

All 15 seats to Antrim Borough Council 8 seats needed for a majority
| | First party | Second party | Third party |
|---|---|---|---|
| Party | UUP | DUP | SDLP |
| Seats won | 7 | 4 | 2 |
| Seat change | ▼1 | ▲1 | ▲2 |
| | Fourth party | Fifth party | Sixth party |
| Party | Alliance | Irish Independence | Independent |
| Seats won | 1 | 1 | 0 |
| Seat change | ▼1 | ▲1 | ▼2 |

Elections to Antrim Borough Council were held on 20 May 1981 on the same day as the other Northern Irish local government elections. The election used three district electoral areas to elect a total of 15 councillors.

== Election results ==
Antrim Borough Council Election Result 1981
| Party | Seats | Gains | Losses | Net gain/loss | Seats % | Votes % | Votes | +/− |
|---|---|---|---|---|---|---|---|---|
| UUP | 7 | 0 | 1 | ▼1 | 36.8 | 38.0 | 5,945 | ▲0.6 |
| DUP | 4 | 1 | 0 | ▲1 | 21.1 | 28.1 | 4,389 | ▲9.7 |
| SDLP | 2 | 2 | 0 | ▲2 | 10.5 | 10.7 | 1,670 | ▲10.7 |
| Alliance | 1 | 0 | 1 | ▼1 | 5.3 | 10.9 | 1,704 | ▼6.0 |
| Irish Independence | 1 | 1 | 0 | ▲1 | 5.3 | 6.6 | 1,040 | New |
| Independent Labour | 0 | 0 | 0 | 0 | 0.0 | 5.1 | 805 | ▲5.1 |
| Ind. Unionist | 0 | 0 | 0 | 0 | 0.0 | 0.6 | 91 | ▲0.6 |

Note: "Votes" are the first preference votes.

== Districts summary ==
Results of the Antrim Borough Council election, 1981 by district
| Ward | % | Cllrs | % | Cllrs | % | Cllrs | % | Cllrs | % | Cllrs | % | Cllrs | Total Cllrs |
| Ward | UUP | | DUP | | SDLP | | Alliance | | IIP | | Others | | Total Cllrs |
|---|---|---|---|---|---|---|---|---|---|---|---|---|---|
| Area A | 33.1 | 2 | 19.2 | 1 | 21.7 | 1 | 2.4 | 0 | 21.8 | 1 | 1.8 | 0 | 5 |
| Area B | 49.0 | 3 | 27.6 | 1 | 15.4 | 1 | 8.0 | 0 | 0.0 | 0 | 0.0 | 0 | 5 |
| Area C | 34.8 | 2 | 34.6 | 2 | 0.0 | 0 | 18.7 | 1 | 0.0 | 0 | 11.9 | 0 | 5 |
| Total | 38.0 | 7 | 28.1 | 4 | 10.7 | 2 | 10.9 | 1 | 6.6 | 1 | 5.7 | 0 | 15 |

== Districts results ==
=== Area A ===
1977: 2 x UUP, 1 x DUP, 1 x Independent, 1 x Independent Nationalist
1981: 2 x UUP, 1 x DUP, 1 x SDLP, 1 x IIP
1977-1981 Change: SDLP gain from Independent, Independent Nationalist joins IIP

Antrim Area A - 5 seats
| Party | Candidate | FPv% | Count | | | | | | | | | | |
| Party | Candidate | FPv% | 1 | 2 | 3 | 4 | 5 | 6 | 7 | 8 | 9 | 10 | 11 |
|---|---|---|---|---|---|---|---|---|---|---|---|---|---|
| UUP | James Graham* | 27.13% | 1,293 | | | | | | | | | | |
| Irish Independence | John Heffron* | 11.27% | 537 | 538.14 | 540.14 | 545.14 | 609.14 | 609.14 | 959.14 | | | | |
| DUP | Wilson Clyde | 11.18% | 533 | 599.12 | 643.24 | 645.62 | 645.62 | 654.56 | 654.56 | 654.56 | 1,034.56 | | |
| UUP | John Blakeley* | 4.34% | 207 | 434.24 | 455.7 | 489.88 | 489.88 | 660.94 | 660.94 | 660.94 | 734.9 | 971.64 | |
| SDLP | Robert Loughran | 12.65% | 603 | 603.76 | 605.14 | 632.52 | 645.52 | 648.9 | 666.9 | 721.9 | 722.66 | 723.54 | 728.82 |
| SDLP | Gerard Carolan | 9.00% | 429 | 429.38 | 430.38 | 442.38 | 451.38 | 453.38 | 492.38 | 583.38 | 584.38 | 584.38 | 585.26 |
| DUP | Frew Rainey | 7.99% | 381 | 432.68 | 467.28 | 470.28 | 470.28 | 481.4 | 481.4 | 482.4 | | | |
| Irish Independence | Desmond McAteer | 7.11% | 339 | 339 | 339 | 340 | 418 | 418 | | | | | |
| UUP | Mary Marshall | 1.59% | 76 | 175.94 | 187.12 | 210.92 | 210.92 | | | | | | |
| Irish Independence | James Totten | 3.44% | 164 | 164 | 164 | 167 | | | | | | | |
| Alliance | James McConnell | 2.37% | 113 | 121.74 | 124.88 | | | | | | | | |
| Ind. Unionist | Stewart Dunlop* | 1.91% | 91 | 120.64 | | | | | | | | | |
Electorate: 6,381 Valid: 4,766 (74.69%) Spoilt: 135 Quota: 795 Turnout: 4,901 (76.81%)

=== Area B ===
1977: 3 x UUP, 1 x DUP, 1 x Alliance
1981: 3 x UUP, 1 x DUP, 1 x SDLP
1977-1981 Change: SDLP gain from Alliance

Antrim Area B - 5 seats
| Party | Candidate | FPv% | Count | | | | | |
| Party | Candidate | FPv% | 1 | 2 | 3 | 4 | 5 | 6 |
|---|---|---|---|---|---|---|---|---|
| UUP | Edgar Wallace* | 16.66% | 688 | 691 | | | | |
| UUP | James Cunningham* | 16.56% | 684 | 688 | 790 | | | |
| SDLP | Robert Burns | 15.45% | 638 | 640 | 641 | 699 | | |
| UUP | Thomas Grant | 9.64% | 398 | 402 | 501 | 654 | 740 | |
| DUP | Roy Thompson | 14.21% | 587 | 594 | 616 | 638 | 642 | 662 |
| DUP | Allister Lucas* | 13.41% | 554 | 556 | 570 | 579 | 582 | 600 |
| Alliance | John McCourt* | 4.72% | 195 | 302 | 310 | | | |
| UUP | Alexander Wilson | 6.10% | 252 | 253 | | | | |
| Alliance | George Luke | 3.24% | 134 | | | | | |
Electorate: 5,966 Valid: 4,130 (69.23%) Spoilt: 121 Quota: 689 Turnout: 4,251 (71.25%)

=== Area C ===
1977: 3 x UUP, 1 x DUP, 1 x Alliance
1981: 2 x UUP, 2 x DUP, 1 x Alliance
1977-1981 Change: DUP gain from UUP

Antrim Area C - 5 seats
| Party | Candidate | FPv% | Count | | | | | | | | |
| Party | Candidate | FPv% | 1 | 2 | 3 | 4 | 5 | 6 | 7 | 8 | 9 |
|---|---|---|---|---|---|---|---|---|---|---|---|
| DUP | Samuel Dunlop* | 25.47% | 1,719 | | | | | | | | |
| UUP | Paddy Marks | 17.52% | 1,182 | | | | | | | | |
| DUP | Charles Quinn | 9.11% | 615 | 1,120.58 | 1,124.14 | 1,156.14 | | | | | |
| UUP | Jack Allen* | 14.24% | 961 | 999.76 | 1,019.44 | 1,151.44 | | | | | |
| Alliance | Michael Donoghue | 7.87% | 531 | 533.04 | 533.6 | 537.28 | 538.28 | 539.93 | 581.61 | 710.61 | 993.61 |
| Alliance | Charles Kinahan* | 6.89% | 465 | 468.74 | 470.22 | 490.16 | 491.16 | 498.31 | 540.23 | 657.34 | 835.34 |
| Independent Labour | John Gibbons | 8.33% | 562 | 565.4 | 565.52 | 566.04 | 567.04 | 569.24 | 612.96 | 643.47 | |
| Alliance | Mary Wallace | 3.94% | 266 | 268.04 | 268.76 | 278.06 | 280.06 | 288.86 | 324.41 | | |
| Independent Labour | Philip Henry | 3.60% | 243 | 251.16 | 251.88 | 257.5 | 260.5 | 267.1 | | | |
| UUP | Hugh Johnston | 3.02% | 204 | 219.3 | 238.66 | | | | | | |
Electorate: 14,454 Valid: 6,748 (46.69%) Spoilt: 236 Quota: 1,125 Turnout: 6,984 (48.32%)
