= 1977 Northern Ireland local elections =

UK elections

- 18 May 1977

All 526 seats to 26 local authorities
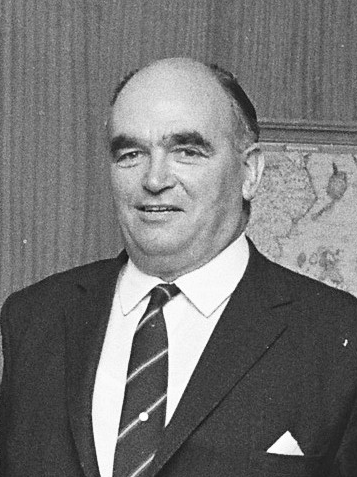

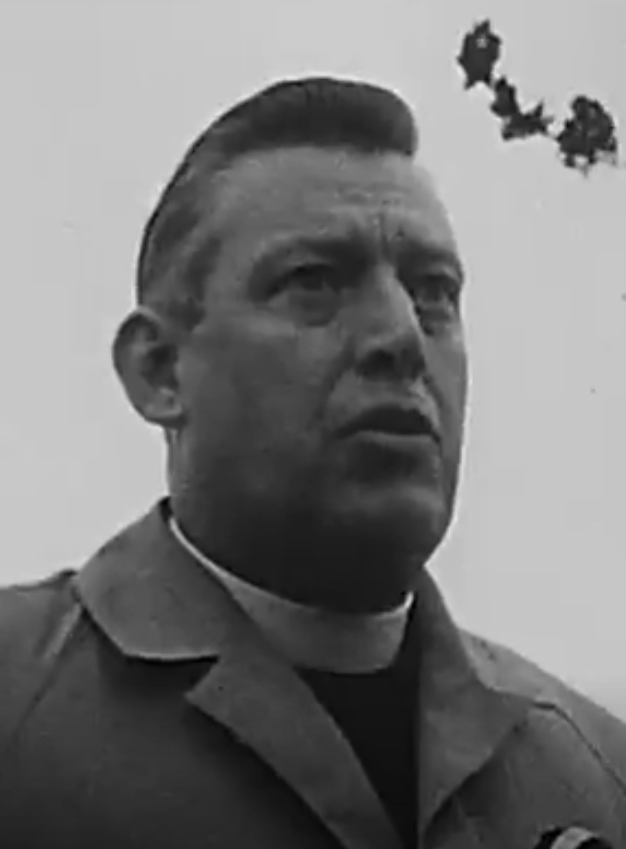
	First party	Second party
		SDL
Leader	Harry West	Gerry Fitt
Party	UUP	SDLP
Seats won	176	113
Seat change	▼18	▲31
Popular vote	166,971	114,775
Percentage	30.0%	20.6%
Swing	▲13.0%	▲7.2%
	Third party	Fourth party
		APNI
Leader	Ian Paisley	Oliver Napier
Party	DUP	Alliance
Seats won	74	70
Seat change	▲53	▲7
Popular vote	70,670	80,282
Percentage	12.8%	14.4%
Swing	▲8.7%	▲0.7%
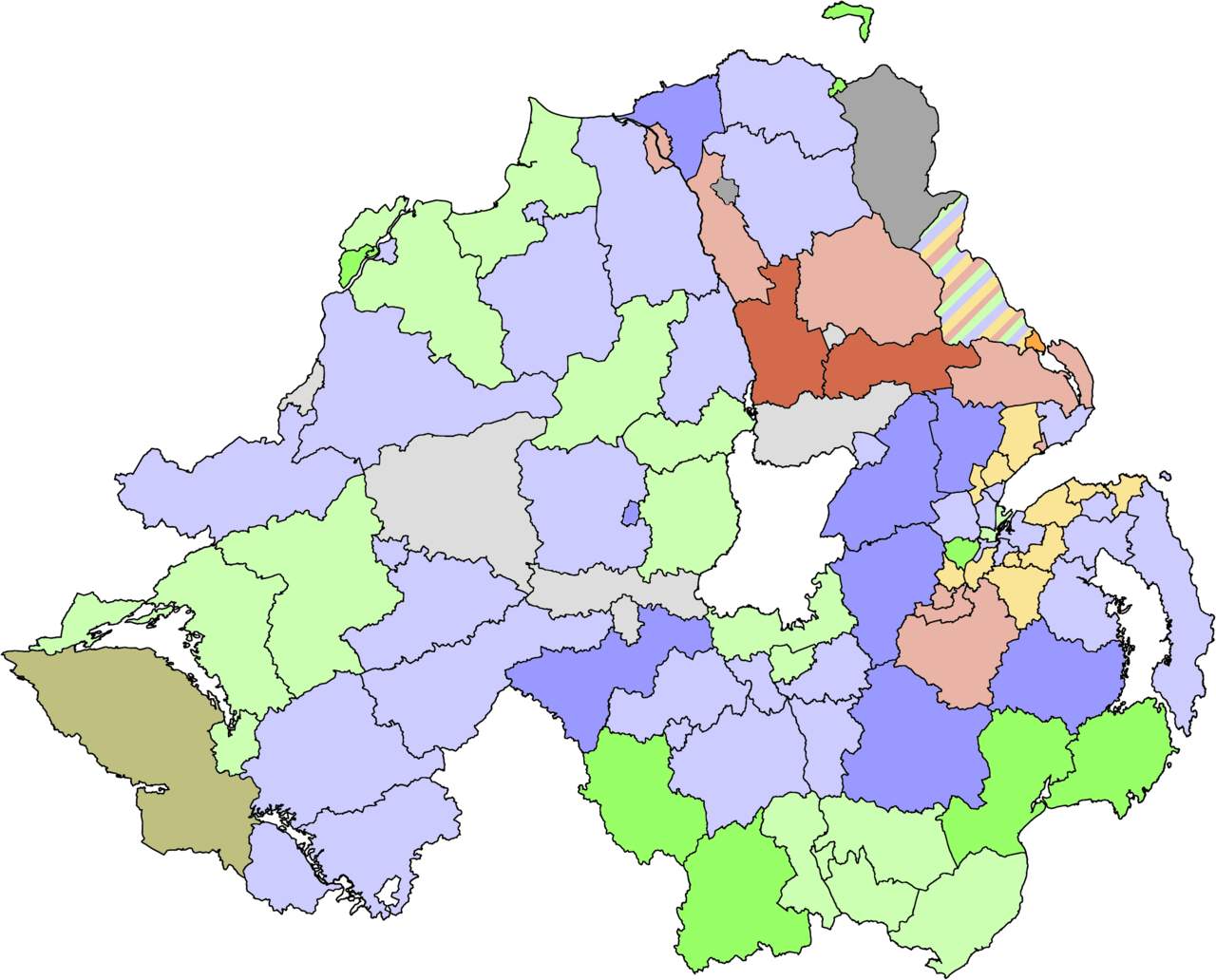

Elections for local government were held in Northern Ireland in May 1977. 526 councillors were elected.

The elections saw good performances by the four largest parties: the Ulster Unionist Party (UUP), Social Democratic and Labour Party (SDLP), Alliance Party of Northern Ireland and Democratic Unionist Party (DUP), while smaller parties failed to make a breakthrough. The DUP took control of their first council, Ballymena, while the UUP retained control of Banbridge. The SDLP lost control of Magherafelt, their only council.

== Results ==
=== Overall ===
Party	Councillors		Votes	
Party	Total	+/-	% share	Total
UUP	176	-18	30.0	166,971
SDLP	113	+31	20.6	114,775
Alliance	70	+7	14.4	80,282
DUP	74	+53	12.8	70,670
Independent	42	-10	7.6	42,841
UUUP	12	N/A	2.8	15,831
Republican Clubs	6	-2	2.6	14,277
Unionist Party NI	6	N/A	2.5	13,691
Ind. Unionist	10	-16	1.7	9,202
Vanguard	5	-5	1.5	8,135
Unity	2	-4	1.0	5,528
NI Labour	1	-3	0.8	4,960
Nationalist	4	0	0.5	2,836
Independent Loyalist	2	-14	0.3	2,534
Independent Community	1	-2	0.3	1,731
British Ulster Dominion	0	N/A	0.1	644
United Ratepayer	1	N/A	0.1	635
Independent Labour	1	+1	0.1	484
Independent Ratepayer	0	0	0.1	321
Ind. Nationalist	0	0	0.0	227
Communist	0	0	0.0	115
Independent Socialist	0	N/A	0.0	107

=== By council ===
==== Antrim ====
Antrim A
Party	Candidate	1st Pref
UUP	James Graham	1,018
Independent	John Heffron	679
Independent	Gerard Berry	542
DUP	Stewart Dunlop	499
Independent	James Marrion	365
DUP	James Brown	360
Independent	John McKeever	290
Alliance	Patrick Gribben	225
UUP	Samuel Getty	168
UUP	Moira Marshall	91
Turnout		4,400
No change

Antrim B
Party	Candidate	1st Pref
UUP	Thomas Wallace	459
UUP	James Cunningham	446
Alliance	John McCourt	394
UUP	George Dundas	306
UUP	William Jones	270
DUP	Allister Lucas	266
UUP	Alexander Wilson	245
Alliance	George Luke	236
DUP	John Patterson	217
Turnout		2,966
DUP gain from UUP		

Antrim C
Party	Candidate	1st Pref
Alliance	Charles Kinahan	825
UUP	Jack Allen	801
DUP	Samuel Dunlop	540
UUP	Samuel McCombe	416
UUP	James Craig	323
Alliance	Florence McLernon	301
Vanguard	James Clarke	299
DUP	William McCormick	282
Independent	Peter Neish	271
Independent	Eileen Lagan	219
British Ulster Dominion Party	David Gregg	136
Independent	Liam McCabe	116
Independent	Martin Hanna	82
British Ulster Dominion Party	Samuel Ferson	69
Turnout		4,897
DUP gain from Vanguard		

==== Ards ====
Ards A
Party	Candidate	1st Pref
Alliance	Charles Dunleath	1,339
DUP	Joseph Thompson	981
SDLP	Patrick Doherty	964
UUP	Oliver Johnston	460
UUP	William Caughey	451
UUP	John Scott	446
Unionist Party NI	Michael Long	371
Independent	James McMullan	313
UUP	Henry Cosbey	308
UUP	Robert Ambrose	287
Alliance	William Sheldon	190
UUP	William Keag	158
Independent	Francis McMaster	128
Independent Protestant Loyalist	Lindsay Mason	102
Ind. Unionist	Vera Shaw	68
Turnout		6,793
Alliance gain (x2) from UUP		
DUP gain from UUP		

Ards B
Party	Candidate	1st Pref
NI Labour	Robert Gaw	843
DUP	Hugh Boyd	780
UUP	John Algie	822
Alliance	Herbert Gallagher	656
Alliance	Owen Dorrian	613
Unionist Party NI	Cecilia Cooke	515
NI Labour	William Allen	506
UUP	William Boal	381
UUP	Hugh Yeaman	314
UUP	William Spratt	288
Vanguard	Robert Brown	277
Turnout		6,227
Alliance gain from Loyalist Coalition		
DUP gain from UUP		

Ards C
Party	Candidate	1st Pref
UUP	Hamilton McKeag	823
DUP	Thomas Gourley	561
Independent	John Shields	520
Alliance	Thomas McBriar	448
Independent	James Middleton	418
Independent	James Caughey	352
UUP	Harold Porter	348
UUP	Adela Hamilton	282
Alliance	Alice Rudnitzky	261
UUUP	William Dempster	170
Independent	Arthur Spence	112
Turnout		4,415
DUP gain from UUP		

==== Armagh ====
Armagh A
Party	Candidate	1st Pref
DUP	Douglas Hutchinson	821
UUP	Mary Huey	688
UUP	Samuel Foster	640
SDLP	Francis McIlvanna	632
SDLP	Francis Kernan	553
UUUP	Noel Lyttle	236
Turnout		3,792
SDLP gain from Independent		

Armagh B
Party	Candidate	1st Pref
UUP	William Henning	1,177
SDLP	Seamus Mallon	1,092
DUP	Thomas Black	1,077
UUP	William McClelland	961
UUP	Jim Speers	701
UUUP	Francis Little	554
UUP	George Parks	513
DUP	Mervyn Spratt	397
Alliance	James McAfee	311
Alliance	Christina Glendinning	188
UUUP	David Robb	142
Turnout		7,370
UUUP gain from UUP		

Armagh C
Party	Candidate	1st Pref
UUP	Eleanor Boyd	1,153
SDLP	Patrick Fegan	956
SDLP	James McKernan	876
SDLP	Joseph Fullerton	735
UUP	Jim Nicholson	680
Alliance	Eugene Connolly	561
Turnout		5,241
SDLP gain from Alliance		

Armagh D
Party	Candidate	1st Pref
UUP	Frederick Armstrong	1,008
Independent	Barney McManus	839
SDLP	Oliver Tobin	686
SDLP	Pat Brannigan	513
Republican Clubs	Patrick Houlihan	507
UUP	Norman Creswell	385
DUP	Letitia McClenaghan	370
SDLP	James McAvinchey	298
Alliance	Norah Dawson	272
UUP	Robert Mercer	200
NI Labour	Paddy Grimes	169
Turnout		5,497
Barney McManus leaves SDLP		
SDLP gain from Republican Clubs and Independent Unionist		

==== Ballymena ====
Ballymena A
Party	Candidate	1st Pref
Independent	James Woulahan	784
DUP	William Turtle	725
DUP	James Millar	584
UUP	Thomas Hume	516
UUP	Thomas McCaughey	496
DUP	Lyle Cubitt	308
United Loyalist	William Wilson	162
Turnout		3,654
DUP gain from UUP		

Ballymena B
Party	Candidate	1st Pref
DUP	Roy Gillespie	N/A
DUP	John Greer	N/A
DUP	Hubert Nicholl	N/A
Independent	Hugh Simpson	N/A
Independent	Thomas Smyth	N/A
DUP	Sandy Spence	N/A
Turnout		N/A
DUP gain from UUP and Independent		

No election was held, as 6 candidates ran for the 6 seats.

Ballymena C
Party	Candidate	1st Pref
DUP	John McAuley	928
Ind. Unionist	George Sloane	850
DUP	Desmond McBurney	762
United Ratepayers	David Allen	635
DUP	Albert Young	383
UUP	William Simpson	323
UUP	Robert McCosh	224
Turnout		4,288
David Allen leaves Vanguard		
George Sloane leaves UUP		
DUP gain (x2) from UUP		

Ballymena D
Party	Candidate	1st Pref
Independent	Patrick Burke	990
Independent	Samuel Henry	810
UUP	William Rainey	674
Alliance	Muriel Lamont	672
DUP	Maurice Mills	637
DUP	James Alexander	607
DUP	Robert McAuley	549
UUP	David Thompson	290
Turnout		5,405
Samuel Henry leaves UUP		
DUP gain from UUP		

==== Ballymoney ====
Ballymoney A
Party	Candidate	1st Pref
DUP	Robert Halliday	430
UUP	Joseph Bamford	329
UUP	Adam Taylor	280
DUP	Ralph Stronge	224
DUP	David Hanna	214
Alliance	Hugh McFarland	208
Independent	Henry McCoy	198
UUP	James Taylor	160
Turnout		2,118
Joseph Bamford joins UUP		
DUP gain from Independent		

Ballymoney B
Party	Candidate	1st Pref
DUP	Charles Steele	753
Independent	Hugh Boyle	592
SDLP	Daniel McAlonan	576
UUP	William Logan	474
UUP	Joe Gaston	373
SDLP	Harry Connolly	367
SDLP	John Mulholland	331
UUP	Patricia Ellis	314
UUP	Robert Chestnutt	235
UUP	Ronald McDowell	146
Turnout		4,257
Joe Gaston and William Logan join UUP		
DUP gain from UUP		
SDLP gain from UUP		

Ballymoney C
Party	Candidate	1st Pref
Independent	Robert McComb	875
Alliance	Brendan Smyth	405
Independent	Mary Holmes	365
Ind. Unionist	Frederick Holland	270
UUP	Samuel Montgomery	168
Alliance	John Greer	85
Independent	Ernest Lee	57
Turnout		2,298
No change

==== Banbridge ====
Banbridge A
Party	Candidate	1st Pref
SDLP	James Walsh	758
UUP	Wilson Davidson	697
DUP	James McElroy	633
Independent	Laurence McCartan	527
UUP	Samuel Cowan	498
UUP	Norman Ferguson	497
DUP	Frederick Baxter	476
Ind. Unionist	Hugh Anderson	419
Alliance	John McWhirter	381
UUP	William McCullagh	350
DUP	Mildred McDowell	161
UUUP	John Porter	219
Independent	Daniel Lennon	215
UUP	John Anderson	213
Alliance	Peter Finnegan	174
Ind. Unionist	James Crozier	165
Turnout		6,484
Wilson Davidson and Samuel Cowan join UUP		
Hugh Anderson changes designation from Independent		
DUP gain from Independent Unionist		
SDLP gain from Independent		

Banbridge B
Party	Candidate	1st Pref
UUP	Matthew Bailey	805
UUP	Raymond McCullough	678
SDLP	Patrick McAvoy	678
DUP	David Herron	628
UUP	Herbert Heslip	472
UUP	George Gamble	457
UUP	Robert Hill	429
SDLP	Michael O'Hare	428
DUP	Ernest Biggerstaff	418
UUP	Eric Williamson	379
UUP	Robert Barr	375
UUUP	John McKinstry	246
Alliance	Edward Gibney	219
Turnout		6,457
Matthew Bailey, Herbert Heslip, Robert Hill, and Raymond McCullough join UUP		
DUP gain (x2) from Independent Unionist		
UUP gain from Independent Unionist		

==== Belfast ====
Belfast A
Party	Candidate	1st Pref
Alliance	Basil Glass	2,580
UUP	Grace Bannister	2,367
DUP	Raymond McCrea	1,912
DUP	Robert J. Newman	1,549
SDLP	Alasdair McDonnell	1,364
UUP	Billy Blair	1,026
Unionist Party NI	T. Jordan	954
UUUP	Ben Horan	954
Alliance	Dennis Loretto	667
NI Labour	B. Garrett	594
UUP	T. Gildea	483
UUP	W. Shannon	452
Ind. Unionist	W. Elliot	379
UUP	A. Shaw	378
UUUP	P. Moles	345
Republican Clubs	T. W. McGrattan	278
NI Labour	D. Peters	93
Turnout		16,898
SDLP gain from NILP		
DUP gain from UUP		
DUP gain from Vanguard		
Alliance gain from UUP		

Belfast B
Party	Candidate	1st Pref
Unionist Party NI	Joshua Cardwell	2,722
Alliance	Oliver Napier	2,703
UUP	Tommy Patton	2,209
Alliance	Michael Brown	2,045
UUP	John Allen	1,903
DUP	H. B. Evans	1,058
UUUP	Reg Empey	981
DUP	T. McIntyre	920
Alliance	D. Wonnacott	781
UUP	William Corry	664
NI Labour	W. J. Gunning	631
UUP	Dorothy Dunlop	622
UUP	J. Hanna	541
UUUP	S. Morgan	237
Turnout		18,741
Joshua Cardwell leaves UUP		
DUP gain from United Loyalist		
Alliance gain from UUP		

Belfast C
Party	Candidate	1st Pref
Alliance	David Cook	2,748
Unionist Party NI	Victor Brennan	1,446
UUP	Andrew Cairns	1,287
Alliance	Muriel Pritchard	1,274
UUP	Margaret Crooks	1,142
SDLP	M. O. Scott	923
Alliance	W. H. Jeffrey	892
DUP	A. McMeekin	872
Vanguard	R. Jordan	780
UUP	John William Kennedy	630
UUP	W. D. Gilmore	619
DUP	W. Spence	604
Ind. Unionist	J. Webster	340
NI Labour	Macartney	330
Independent	W. Weir	313
UUUP	R. A. W. Johnston	199
UUUP	J. Robinson	119
Turnout		15,041
Alliance gain from UUP		
UPNI gain from UUP		

Belfast D
Party	Candidate	1st Pref
SDLP	Paddy Devlin	7,087
Alliance	Dan McGuinness	1,235
Republican Clubs	Bernard McDonagh	942
SDLP	Cormac Boomer	905
SDLP	Mary Sullivan	760
Republican Clubs	M. Lynch	723
Alliance	R. Turkington	575
Republican Clubs	K. Smyth	527
SDLP	W. Hunter	477
Independent Socialist	G. Campbell	107
Turnout		14,932
No change

Belfast E
Party	Candidate	1st Pref
UUP	Billy Bell	3,297
Independent	Jimmy Weir	2,184
DUP	Fred Proctor	1,755
Alliance	Alfred Egerton	1,223
Ind. Unionist	Hugh Smyth	1,140
NI Labour	G. Chambers	809
Independent	H. Stackman	718
DUP	W. Lavery	715
UUP	D. Smylie	667
UUP	J. Sands	412
UUP	Alfie Ferguson	366
Independent	Peter Emerson	236
Turnout		14,228
Independent gain from United Loyalist		
UUP gain from NILP		

Belfast F
Party	Candidate	1st Pref
SDLP	Owen Allen	1,886
UUP	James Stewart	1,681
Republican Clubs	Jim Sullivan	1,099
UUP	Harry Fletcher	1,081
Alliance	Will Glendinning	1,077
DUP	Billy Dickson	949
SDLP	T. Lappin	899
DUP	J. H. Parkes	525
UUP	T. G. Murphy	369
Republican Clubs	S. O'Hare	306
Communist	James Stewart	115
Turnout		11,040
Alliance gain from UUP		

Belfast G
Party	Candidate	1st Pref
SDLP	Gerry Fitt	3,006
DUP	Frederick Ashby	1,377
Republican Clubs	Seamus Lynch	1,323
UUP	Herbert Ditty	1,043
UUP	Cecil Walker	779
DUP	G. A. Haffey	742
UUP	M. Laird	592
UUP	Sammy Millar	515
Ind. Unionist	H. H. Kidd	387
Alliance	McKeown	320
Turnout		10,970
DUP gain from UUP		
Republican Clubs gain from Independent Unionist		

Belfast H
Party	Candidate	1st Pref
SDLP	Paschal O'Hare	2,414
Ind. Unionist	Frank Millar	2,321
UUP	John Carson	2,250
UUP	Myles Humphreys	1,942
Alliance	John Cushnahan	1,865
DUP	William Annon	1,507
SDLP	Alban Maginness	1,099
Alliance	R. O. Jamison	944
NI Labour	Alan Carr	502
Unionist Party NI	J. E. Gibson	462
DUP	Cynthia McDowell	441
UUP	J. S. Kennet	439
UUP	Mary Creighton	331
Dominion Party	A. Beattie	114
Turnout		17,316
Frank Millar leaves UUP		
Alliance gain from UUP		
DUP gain from UUP		

==== Carrickfergus ====
Carrick A
Party	Candidate	1st Pref
Alliance	Joan Tomlin	709
United Loyalist	Charles Johnston	575
UUP	Mary Ardill	383
DUP	Joseph Seaton	378
Unionist Party NI	William Johnstone	325
UUP	Robert Hunter	233
Alliance	Stewart Dickson	227
UUP	Robert McAllister	166
UUP	Edward Simms	131
Turnout		3,267
Alliance gain from United Loyalist		

Carrick B
Party	Candidate	1st Pref
Alliance	Charles Hilditch	745
UUP	George Armstrong	683
DUP	Desmond Scott	425
UUP	Hugh McLean	415
Alliance	Patrick Conway	271
Alliance	Alice Bateman	256
United Loyalist	Charles Brown	253
UUP	David McCune	244
Independent	Elizabeth McMaster	183
Turnout		3,566
Alliance gain from Independent		
DUP gain from United Loyalist		

Carrick C
Party	Candidate	1st Pref
DUP	Ken McFaul	788
Unionist Party NI	Samuel Murphy	667
Alliance	Sean Neeson	395
Alliance	Allison Lowry	354
UUP	Samuel Simms	238
UUUP	Gladys Ritchie	237
UUP	James Penny	205
United Loyalist	Ernest Burton	193
DUP	John Moore	144
Turnout		3,376
Ken McFaul joins DUP		
DUP gain from United Loyalist		
UPNI gain from United Loyalist		

==== Castlereagh ====
Castlereagh A
Party	Candidate	1st Pref
UUP	Bertie Barker	955
Alliance	Philip Grosse	881
Alliance	Thomas Hawthorne	863
Independent Community	Ernest Harper	838
DUP	James Lowe	782
DUP	William Stevenson	682
Alliance	Margaret Hull	668
UUP	Frederick Kane	646
UUP	William Stewart	523
Vanguard	John Moore	318
Turnout		7,382
Bertie Barker and Frederick Kane join UUP		
DUP gain from United Loyalist		
Independent Community gain from UUP		

Castlereagh B
Party	Candidate	1st Pref
Alliance	Adam Morrow	884
Alliance	Felicity Boyd	843
UUP	Matthew Anderson	699
Ind. Unionist	Walter McFarland	562
DUP	John Gilpin	521
Alliance	Thomas McQueen	512
UUP	Leslie Farrington	501
Vanguard	Thomas Lyons	443
DUP	John Lamont	421
UUUP	James Scott	408
DUP	John Hill	332
Unionist Party NI	Brent Hughes	261
UUP	Joseph O'Hara	226
Loyalist Christian Unionist	Michael Brooks	171
NI Labour	John Barkley	169
Independent	Ronald McLean	136
Unionist Party NI	Pauline Mateer	119
Independent Community	Robert Allen	53
Independent	William Copley	26
Turnout		8,099
Alliance gain from UUP		
DUP gain from UUP and United Loyalist		
Independent Unionist gain from United Loyalist		

Castlereagh C
Party	Candidate	1st Pref
UUP	Herbert Johnstone	1,200
DUP	Peter Robinson	1,171
Alliance	Patricia Archer	887
Alliance	Samuel Finlay	557
Alliance	Bryan Davidson	530
Vanguard	Norman Kyle	382
UUP	Elizabeth Rea	304
Independent Community	John Snodden	299
UUUP	Valerie Walsh	114
Turnout		5,619
Alliance gain from Independent		
DUP gain from UUP		

==== Coleraine ====
Coleraine A
Party	Candidate	1st Pref
UUP	James Anderson	761
UUP	William King	674
SDLP	John Dallat	623
Ind. Unionist	William Watt	623
DUP	Robert Catherwood	605
SDLP	Patrick Cassidy	552
UUP	George McIlrath	543
DUP	Robert Campbell	508
UUP	Robert McMaster	504
Alliance	Martha McGrath	281
Republican Clubs	Jerry Mullan	207
SDLP	Robert Tosh	143
Turnout		6,284
James Anderson joins UUP		
DUP gain from UUP		

Coleraine B
Party	Candidate	1st Pref
UUP	William Glenn	725
UUP	Albert Clarke	668
Independent	Alexander Sharpe	619
UUP	Robert Stafford	564
UUP	John Earl	455
Alliance	Thomas Wilson	439
Vanguard	Antony Alcock	426
UUP	Robert Mitchell	375
SDLP	Sean Farren	359
Alliance	Donald Batts	283
SDLP	Hugh McIlvenna	237
Alliance	Patrick McGowan	173
Turnout		5,552
Alexander Sharpe leaves UUP		
SDLP gain from Alliance		

Coleraine C
Party	Candidate	1st Pref
DUP	James McClure	2,111
Independent	Patrick McFeely	911
UUP	Robert White	773
Independent	Randall Crawford	621
Alliance	William Mathews	546
UUP	Matthew Adams	523
Alliance	Francis Trainor	224
Independent	William McNabb	206
Ind. Unionist	James Edwards	203
UUP	Victor Hanson	189
UUP	John Millar	155
Independent Ratepayers' Association	Henry McCormick	120
Vanguard	Adrian Eakin	91
Independent Ratepayers' Association	Samuel Walker	85
UUP	Charles Graham	70
Independent Ratepayers' Association	Frederick Millar	48
Independent Ratepayers' Association	Samuel Oliver	38
Independent Ratepayers' Association	Howard Platt	30
Turnout		7,197
DUP gain from UUP		

==== Cookstown ====
Cookstown A
Party	Candidate	1st Pref
DUP	Richard Reid	846
Independent	Laurence Loughran	840
UUP	Samuel Glasgow	716
SDLP	Peter Kelly	616
UUUP	Samuel Parke	525
Republican Clubs	Desmond Gourley	464
UUP	Stanley Glasgow	375
SDLP	Charles O'Neill	298
Alliance	J. R. W. O'Connor	108
Turnout		4,971
Samuel Parke joins UUUP		
DUP gain from Independent Unionist		
SDLP gain from Republican Clubs		

Cookstown B
Party	Candidate	1st Pref
SDLP	Paddy Duffy	973
UUP	James Howard	931
Independent	Michael McIvor	924
UUUP	Victor McGahie	921
UUUP	William McIntyre	685
SDLP	Joseph Davidson	589
SDLP	James Malone	436
Alliance	Austin Hutchinson	195
Turnout		5,881
Victor McGahie and William McIntyre join UUUP		

Cookstown C
Party	Candidate	1st Pref
UUP	Espie Donaldson	1,018
SDLP	Brigid Neeson	801
UUP	John Warwick	709
SDLP	Margaret Laverty	624
Alliance	Basil McNamee	443
UUP	Alex McConnell	332
Turnout		4,048
SDLP gain from UUP		

==== Craigavon ====
Craigavon A
Party	Candidate	1st Pref
SDLP	James McDonald	1,013
SDLP	Sean McKavanagh	898
Republican Clubs	Malachy McGurran	868
DUP	Frederick Baird	696
Alliance	Donnell Deeny	583
SDLP	Patrick Crilly	581
UUP	James Gillespie	444
UUP	Eric McKeown	341
Turnout		5,745
James McDonald joins SDLP		
Republican Clubs gain from Alliance		
SDLP joins DUP		

Craigavon B
Party	Candidate	1st Pref
UUP	Herbert Whitten	1,863
Alliance	John Hagan	823
SDLP	Daniel Murphy	804
DUP	Gladys McCullough	546
DUP	James Forsythe	498
Alliance	William Ramsay	483
UUP	George Locke	460
UUP	John Wright	457
SDLP	Mary Mackle	457
DUP	William Stothers	346
Vanguard	Samuel McCammick	211
UUUP	John Lyttle	144
UUUP	James McBratney	131
Vanguard	William Lappin	54
Turnout		7,667
John Wright joins UUP		
DUP gain from Vanguard		
SDLP gain from Vanguard		

Craigavon C
Party	Candidate	1st Pref
SDLP	Hugh News	1,194
UUP	Frank Dale	854
DUP	William Williamson	726
SDLP	Robert McEvoy	675
UUP	Mary Simpson	531
Republican Clubs	Patrick O'Malley	452
Alliance	Brian English	451
Unionist Party NI	Florence Woodman	426
UUUP	William Cooper	383
Vanguard	Frederick Crowe	334
SDLP	Virginia King	269
Republican Clubs	Roger Monteith	258
Alliance	William Blanton	245
UUP	James Glenn	226
UUUP	Robert Anderson	202
Independent	Hugh Casey	167
Alliance	Michael Stevenson	117
Turnout		7,835
DUP gain from Vanguard		
SDLP gain from UUP		

Craigavon D
Party	Candidate	1st Pref
DUP	David Calvert	1,081
UUP	James Baird	915
UUUP	Philip Black	847
UUP	Sydney Cairns	837
UUP	Eric Crozier	709
SDLP	Brid Rodgers	704
UUP	Thomas Creith	684
DUP	Thomas Willey	678
UUP	Thomas Megarrell	506
Alliance	Charles Phillips	471
DUP	Harold Glass	300
UUUP	John Dummigan	200
Turnout		8,298
James Baird, Sydney Cairns, and Thomas Creith join UUP		
Philip Black joins UUUP		

==== Down ====
Down A
Party	Candidate	1st Pref
SDLP	Patrick Smyth	837
UUP	Edward McVeigh	733
UUP	Samuel Osborne	631
UUP	William Finlay	604
UUP	William Brown	597
UUUP	Andrew Gaskin	569
Alliance	Denis Rowan-Hamilton	528
UUP	James Cochrane	468
Alliance	John Rodgers	362
UUP	Hugh Martin	279
Independent	George Kerr	268
SDLP	Francis Laverty	257
SDLP	Allen Gilgunn	220
Unionist Party NI	William Hutton	162
Unionist Party NI	John McKee	100
Turnout		6,836
William Finlay, Edward McVeigh, and Samuel Osborne join UUP		
SDLP gain from Vanguard		
UUP gain from Independent Unionist		

Down B
Party	Candidate	1st Pref
SDLP	Edward McGrady	1,524
SDLP	Dermot Curran	994
UUP	Cecil Maxwell	848
SDLP	John Ritchie	595
SDLP	Sean Quinn	548
Republican Clubs	Raymond Blaney	536
SDLP	Theresa McEvoy	467
UUP	Robert Nicholson	442
Alliance	George Flinn	365
Independent	John Bryce	289
Alliance	William McNamara	229
Independent	James McDowell	179
Turnout		7,278
Cecil Maxwell joins UUP		
SDLP gain from Independent		

Down C
Party	Candidate	1st Pref
SDLP	Patrick O'Donoghue	1,335
UUP	Ethel Smyth	787
SDLP	James Magee	687
UUP	Norman Bicker	663
SDLP	Eamon O'Neill	651
SDLP	Jarlath Carey	643
SDLP	James McClean	493
UUP	William Keown	468
Alliance	Patrick Forde	422
Alliance	Joseph Keenan	364
Unionist Party NI	John Beck	332
Alliance	Patrick Doherty	176
Unionist Party NI	Henry Cromie	106
Turnout		7,525
Alliance gain from Independent Unionist		
UUP gain (x2) from Independent Unionist		

==== Dungannon ====
Dungannon A
Party	Candidate	1st Pref
SDLP	Joseph Higgins	921
UUP	John Hamilton-Stubber	706
Independent	Brian McKenna	692
SDLP	Edward Donnelly	661
UUP	Mervyn Patterson	558
UUP	Winston Mulligan	537
DUP	William McIlwrath	511
UUUP	Ian McCormick	401
Independent	Jack Johnston	245
Turnout		5,469
John Hamilton-Stubber and Mervyn Patterson join UUP		
DUP gain from Independent Unionist		
SDLP gain from Unity		

Dungannon B
Party	Candidate	1st Pref
Independent	Jim Canning	1,494
UUP	Thomas Kempton	1,314
SDLP	Owen Nugent	817
Independent	John Corr	550
SDLP	Patrick McGlinchey	536
Independent	Arthur Donaghy	422
Republican Clubs	Eugene Lyttle	394
SDLP	Brian McLernon	238
Alliance	Francis Falls	116
Republican Clubs	James McQuaid	115
Turnout		6,229
Thomas Kempton joins UUP		
Eugene Lyttle changes designation from Republican		
Independent gain from Official Republican		

Dungannon C
Party	Candidate	1st Pref
UUP	Wilfred Dilworth	1,182
UUP	Derek Irwin	1,140
SDLP	Patsy Daly	980
UUP	David Brady	795
UUP	William Buchanan	690
SDLP	Mary McKinney	295
Independent	Anthony Byrne	271
Turnout		5,630
David Brady, William Buchanan, Wilfred Dilworth, and Derek Irwin join UUP		

Dungannon D
Party	Candidate	1st Pref
Independent	Jack Hassard	1,246
UUP	William Brown	915
SDLP	Michael McLoughlin	838
DUP	Maurice Morrow	832
UUP	Adam Wilson	600
Independent	John Donaghy	468
Alliance	Peter Acheson	177
Independent	Malacy Hughes	160
SDLP	Sean Kerr	136
Republican Clubs	Patrick McGurk	108
Alliance	Hugh Cullen	80
Turnout		5,729
William Brown joins UUP		
DUP gain from Independent Unionist		
Independent gain from Independent Unionist and Unity		

==== Fermanagh ====
Fermanagh A
Party	Candidate	1st Pref
UUP	Jack Leahy	1,327
Independent	James McBarron	1,205
SDLP	Thomas Murray	1,008
Unity	John Joe McCusker	959
Unity	John McMahon	807
UUP	Thomas Johnston	618
SDLP	Ann McQuillan	489
Turnout		6,602
Jack Leahy joins UUP		
Thomas Murray joins SDLP		
Independent gain from Unity		

Fermanagh B
Party	Candidate	1st Pref
UUP	Cecil Noble	1,202
UUUP	Hugh Buchanan	1,081
SDLP	Damien Campbell	772
UUP	Norman Brown	634
UUP	Cyril Crozier	553
Unity	Patrick Martin	361
Unity	Vera Cleary	276
Unity	Patrick McKenna	253
SDLP	Margaret Traynor	191
Alliance	James Henderson	119
Turnout		5,621
Norman Brown joins UUP		
SDLP gain from Unity		
UUUP gain from UUP		

Fermanagh C
Party	Candidate	1st Pref
Unity	Patrick McCaffrey	1,054
UUUP	Cyril Brownlee	1,081
UUP	Wilson Elliott	763
Independent	Patrick Flanagan	750
SDLP	Gerard Gallagher	713
UUP	Richard Thornton	560
Independent	James Mellor	400
Unity	Cornelius Leonard	361
Unity	Patrick Keown	298
SDLP	Patrick McGovern	234
Turnout		6,162
William Elliott joins UUP		
SDLP gain from UUP		

Fermanagh D
Party	Candidate	1st Pref
UUUP	Bert Johnston	1,358
SDLP	John O'Kane	1,026
SDLP	John Maguire	957
UUP	Hugh Keys	716
UUP	Caldwell McClaughrey	653
UUP	Robert McFarland	420
SDLP	James Montague	313
Unity	James Gallagher	298
Unionist Party NI	Francis Gage	197
Alliance	Patrick Reihill	136
Turnout		6,204
UUUP gain from Independent Unionist		

Fermanagh E
Party	Candidate	1st Pref
UUUP	Thomas Scott	915
UUP	Raymond Ferguson	774
SDLP	Jim Lunny	707
Unity	James Cox	658
UUP	Robert Donaldson	584
SDLP	Jim Donnelly	558
SDLP	Mathew Kelly	424
Unionist Party NI	George Cathcart	330
Alliance	Marjorie Moore	292
Independent	Thaddeus McKeown	214
Turnout		5,627
Thomas Scott joins UUUP		
UUP gain from Independent Unionist		

==== Larne ====
Larne A
Party	Candidate	1st Pref
DUP	Samuel Martin	N/A
UUP	Thomas Robinson	N/A
SDLP	John Turnley	N/A
Alliance	Hugh Wilson	N/A
Turnout		N/A
DUP gain from United Loyalist		
SDLP gain from Independent		

As 4 candidates ran for the 4 seats, no election was held and all candidates were declared elected.

Larne B
Party	Candidate	1st Pref
DUP	Roy Beggs	675
Alliance	William Calwell	498
UUP	Alexander Hunter	423
Vanguard	Laurence Niblock	301
Vanguard	Robert Semple	238
DUP	Horace Stronge	177
Turnout		2,415
Roy Beggs joins DUP		
Alliance gain from Independent		
UUP gain from Loyalist		
Vanguard gain from Loyalist		

Larne C
Party	Candidate	1st Pref
Vanguard	Thomas Seymour	1,273
Alliance	William Kelly	919
DUP	Jack McKee	633
Independent	Kathleen O'Brien	494
DUP	Winston Fulton	413
Alliance	Thomas Benson	362
Independent	Agnew Hamilton	350
Alliance	John Snoddy	186
British Ulster Dominion Party	James Wisely	178
Vanguard	Rosalie Armstrong	172
UUUP	Thomas McKeever	146
UUP	Alexander Marrs	92
Vanguard	Frederick Dodds	61
Turnout		5,446
Jack McKee joins DUP		
Rosalie Armstrong and Thomas Seymour join Vanguard		
Independent gain from Loyalist		

==== Limavady ====
Limavady A
Party	Candidate	1st Pref
SDLP	Michael Nicholas	724
UUP	Robert Grant	552
SDLP	Thomas Mullan	505
DUP	Ernest Murray	486
SDLP	Arthur Doherty	378
UUP	Florence Sloan	359
Alliance	James Boylan	340
UUP	Hugh Guthrie	320
Alliance	Stanley Stewart	63
Turnout		3,840
Robert Grant and Florence Sloan join UUP		
DUP gain from United Unionist		
SDLP gain from Alliance		

Limavady B
Party	Candidate	1st Pref
UUP	David Robinson	627
SDLP	Raymond Brady	545
Independent	Denis Farren	492
DUP	John McKay	378
UUP	Max Gault	360
SDLP	Joseph McLaughlin	286
SDLP	James Brolly	173
Republican Clubs	James McLaughlin	121
UUP	William Scott	59
Turnout		3,175
Ulster Unionist gain (x2) from United Unionist		

Limavady C
Party	Candidate	1st Pref
SDLP	Barry Doherty	817
UUP	William Barbour	684
DUP	William Norris	559
UUP	Ronald Nicholl	515
UUP	Stanley Gault	511
Alliance	Willie Archibald	330
Alliance	Brian Brown	141
Turnout		3,689
William Barbour and Ronald Nicholl join UUP		
DUP gain from United Unionist		
SDLP gain from Alliance		

==== Lisburn ====
Lisburn A
Party	Candidate	1st Pref
UUP	Robert Campbell	889
DUP	Charles Woodburne	695
SDLP	John Clenaghan	687
UUP	James Dillon	493
UUP	Henry Stewart	342
Alliance	Patrick Dorrian	242
UUUP	Henry Sloan	108
Turnout		3,630
DUP gain from UUP		

Lisburn B
Party	Candidate	1st Pref
DUP	Charles Poots	1,174
Alliance	Moore Sinnerton	656
UUUP	William Bleakes	606
UUP	Elsie Kelsey	548
UUP	Thomas Lilburn	523
UUP	James Lilley	334
DUP	Samuel Dorman	318
UUUP	John Curry	181
Turnout		4,448
DUP gain from UUP		
UUUP gain from UUP		

Lisburn C
Party	Candidate	1st Pref
DUP	William Belshaw	1,388
Alliance	Seamus Close	987
UUP	William Watson	894
UUUP	George Morrison	704
Vanguard	Ronnie Crawford	441
UUP	Wilfred McClung	397
DUP	Denis McCarroll	233
Alliance	Thomas Hughes	188
Turnout		5,456
George Morrison joins UUUP		

Lisburn D
Party	Candidate	1st Pref
DUP	Ivan Davis	1,758
Unionist Party NI	Robert Kirkwood	1,485
Alliance	George Boyd	1,218
UUP	Samuel Semple	950
UUP	Maureen McKinney	476
Alliance	Hazel Devine	381
UUUP	James Davis	282
Independent	Gerald King	207
Vanguard	Andrew Oliver	66
Turnout		7,022
Robert Kirkwood leaves UUP		

Lisburn E
Party	Candidate	1st Pref
Alliance	John Cousins	1,047
UUP	William McAllister	1,007
SDLP	William McDonnell	876
DUP	William Beattie	630
DUP	Robert McNeice	528
Alliance	Brion Fitzsimons	445
UUP	David Saulters	418
Republican Clubs	Gerard Dunlop	305
UUUP	Jean Bell	189
Turnout		5,710
SDLP gain from UUP		

==== Londonderry ====
Londonderry A
Party	Candidate	1st Pref
UUP	Thomas Craig	945
SDLP	John McNickle	882
SDLP	George Peoples	765
SDLP	Thomas Doherty	762
UUP	Robert Bond	724
DUP	John Henry	694
UUP	Alan Lindsay	630
Alliance	Arthur Barr	526
SDLP	Patrick Boyle	464
UUP	Vincent Lindsay	332
DUP	Joseph Mooney	216
Alliance	James Patterson	170
NI Labour	Delap Stevenson	44
Turnout		7,422
Thomas Craig and Robert Bond join UUP		
DUP gain from United Loyalist		
SDLP gain from Alliance		

Londonderry B
Party	Candidate	1st Pref
Alliance	Herbert Faulkner	1,156
SDLP	Michael Fegan	1,020
UUP	James Guy	832
UUP	Kathleen Milligan	776
SDLP	William Doherty	694
DUP	Anna Hay	688
Vanguard	Samuel Barr	408
DUP	Gregory Campbell	388
UUP	Thomas Robinson	351
United Ulster Unionist Council	Thomas Heatley	189
Alliance	Florence Lewers	131
United Ulster Unionist Council	William Gurney	84
NI Labour	David Buchanan	42
Turnout		6,990
Anna Hay joins DUP		
UUP gain (x2) from United Loyalist		

Londonderry C
Party	Candidate	1st Pref
SDLP	Patrick Devine	1,004
SDLP	Hugh Doherty	782
Nationalist	Gerard Barr	478
Nationalist	John McChrystal	466
SDLP	Leonard Green	432
Republican Clubs	Michael Montgomery	418
SDLP	Joseph Moran	312
Alliance	Gerard O'Grady	298
Republican Clubs	Liam Gallagher	133
Nationalist	George O'Connor	84
People's Candidate	Patrick Quinn	61
Turnout		4,780
Nationalist gain from Republican Clubs		

Londonderry D
Party	Candidate	1st Pref
SDLP	Raymond McClean	927
UUP	Marlene Jefferson	631
SDLP	William Keys	598
Nationalist	James Bradley	374
Alliance	Joe Crosgrove	265
SDLP	William McCartney	253
Ind. Nationalist	James Hegarty	185
Nationalist	John McQuaide	159
Nationalist	Charles McDaid	153
Turnout		3,719
Marlene Jefferson joins UUP		
SDLP gain from Alliance		

Londonderry E
Party	Candidate	1st Pref
UUP	Jack Allen	1,337
SDLP	Frank Donnelly	1,329
SDLP	William O'Connell	875
Alliance	Ivor Canavan	825
Nationalist	Fergus McAteer	753
SDLP	Noel McKenna	728
SDLP	William McCorriston	635
Community Candidate	Michael Durey	479
UUP	Albert McCartney	411
Alliance	Edith Roulston	148
Nationalist	Hugh Bell	112
Nationalist	Kathleen Heraghty	59
Turnout		8,003
John Allen joins UUP		
SDLP gain from United Loyalist		

==== Magherafelt ====
Magherafelt A
Party	Candidate	1st Pref
SDLP	Philip Bradley	1,243
SDLP	Patrick Sweeney	690
UUP	John Kenning	656
UUP	Francis Thompson	653
Republican Clubs	Francis Donnelly	560
SDLP	Frank McKendry	455
DUP	Phyllis Charlton	449
Republican Clubs	Kevin Murphy	193
Republican Clubs	Peter Merron	99
Turnout		5,283
UUP gain from SDLP		

Magherafelt B
Party	Candidate	1st Pref
DUP	Matthew Hyndman	768
Independent	Vincent O'Neill	685
UUP	Thomas Kelso	584
UUUP	Robert Overend	525
SDLP	Patrick Scullion	509
UUP	Robert Shiels	381
SDLP	John Madden	378
UUP	David Porte	306
Republican Clubs	Murty Dorrity	281
SDLP	Frank McWilliams	227
Republican Clubs	Michael Scullion	190
Alliance	Thomas Smyth	185
Vanguard	Ian Davidson	165
Turnout		5,376
DUP gain from Vanguard		
UUUP gain from UUP		

Magherafelt C
Party	Candidate	1st Pref
DUP	William McCrea	1,322
SDLP	William Conaghan	814
SDLP	Michael O'Neill	783
UUP	Thomas Bradley	547
Alliance	Wilfred Brennen	468
DUP	George Miller	358
SDLP	Joseph Walls	352
UUUP	Bobby Ditty	260
UUUP	Ruby Speer	187
Unionist Party NI	William Galway	181
Alliance	George Logue	74
Turnout		5,618
William McCrea joins DUP		
DUP gain from UUP		

==== Moyle ====
Moyle A
Party	Candidate	1st Pref
Independent	Fergus Wheeler	406
Independent	Alistair McSparran	394
Independent	Patrick McCarry	364
SDLP	Archie McIntosh	326
SDLP	John McKay	290
Independent	Arthur McAlister	247
Turnout		2,083
SDLP gain from Independent		

Moyle B
Party	Candidate	1st Pref
Independent	James McShane	472
Ind. Unionist	Price McConaghy	420
Ind. Unionist	Matt Colgan	333
DUP	Mary Morrison	226
Ind. Unionist	Robert McKay	206
DUP	George McFadden	166
Ind. Unionist	Samuel Adams	159
UUP	Hugh Acheson	145
Ind. Unionist	Lee Walker	145
Independent	Maureen Gaston	103
Ind. Unionist	William McConaghy	80
DUP	Ronnie McIlvar	69
Turnout		2,589
Robert McKay leaves UUP		
Samuel Adams changes designation from Independent		
Independent Unionist gain from UUP		
DUP gain from Independent and UUP		

Moyle C
Party	Candidate	1st Pref
SDLP	John Black	418
UUP	Elizabeth Johnstone	279
Independent	Archie McAuley	229
SDLP	John McAfee	200
SDLP	Joseph Donaghy	116
Alliance	John Scott	107
Alliance	Maurice McHenry	66
Turnout		1,481
No change

==== Newry and Mourne ====
Newry and Mourne A
Party	Candidate	1st Pref
UUP	William Russell	1,238
DUP	George Graham	884
SDLP	Anne Marie Cunningham	873
UUP	William Coulter	573
SDLP	Frank MacCann	569
Independent	Arthur Dornan	507
SDLP	Hugh Cunningham	418
Independent	John Henning	400
Alliance	Doreen Leitch	127
Turnout		5,881
William Coulter and William Russell join UUP		
DUP gain from Independent Unionist		
SDLP gain from Independent		

Newry and Mourne B
Party	Candidate	1st Pref
SDLP	Jim McCart	1,377
Alliance	Anthony Williamson	692
Independent	John McAteer	687
SDLP	Brian Mulligan	436
SDLP	Liam Trainor	358
UUP	William Gordon	340
Republican Clubs	Thomas Moore	205
UUP	James Thompson	164
Alliance	James McGowan	84
Turnout		4,619
No change

Newry and Mourne C
Party	Candidate	1st Pref
UUP	Violet Cromie	1,075
SDLP	Nan Sands	922
SDLP	Patrick McAlinden	730
UUP	Edward Walsh	537
Republican Clubs	Daniel Mussen	164
Turnout		3,673
Violet Cromie joins UUP		
UUP gain from Independent		

Newry and Mourne D
Party	Candidate	1st Pref
UUP	Clarence Morrow	845
SDLP	John Bell	816
UUP	Andrew Moffett	774
SDLP	Thomas McGrath	756
SDLP	John McEvoy	705
Independent	John Markey	559
Alliance	Victor Frizell	498
SDLP	John Grant	388
Republican Clubs	Noel Collins	332
Independent	Fabian Boyle	276
Republican Clubs	Edward McKeown	150
SDLP	Patrick Sloan	142
Alliance	Monica Sweeney	105
Turnout		6,689
Clarence Morrow joins UUP		
UUP gain from Republican Clubs		

Newry and Mourne E
Party	Candidate	1st Pref
SDLP	Pat Toner	948
SDLP	Peter McMahon	807
SDLP	James Savage	785
Independent	Sean McCreesh	632
UUP	Caroline Donaldson	574
SDLP	Owen Kelly	571
Independent	Jim Murphy	441
Republican Clubs	Seamus Murphy	269
Alliance	John Magowan	67
Turnout		5,378
SDLP gain from Republican Clubs		

Newry and Mourne F
Party	Candidate	1st Pref
UUP	William McCaigue	958
SDLP	Arthur Ruddy	777
SDLP	Daniel Hughes	594
SDLP	William Feely	566
Alliance	Michael McVerry	405
Alliance	John McClelland	404
Republican Clubs	Alan Wadforth	105
Turnout		4,295
UUP gain from Alliance		

==== Newtownabbey ====
Newtownabbey A
Party	Candidate	1st Pref
UUP	Sidney Cameron	1,053
DUP	Mary Harkness	646
UUP	James Wilson	572
Alliance	Patrick McCudden	544
UUP	Arthur Templeton	482
UUP	Samuel Todd	199
British Ulster Dominion Party	Kennedy Lindsay	147
Turnout		3,752
Arthur Templeton joins UUP		
Alliance gain from UUP		

Newtownabbey B
Party	Candidate	1st Pref
UUP	Ivan Hunter	737
DUP	George Herron	693
UUP	Doris Robb	529
Alliance	John Elliott	516
Loyalist	Cecil Stringer	457
Newtownabbey Labour Party	Bob Kidd	367
Alliance	John Mellor	304
Independent	Thomas Gourley	231
UUP	James McWatters	210
Republican Clubs	James Magee	168
Newtownabbey Labour Party	Brian Caul	117
Turnout		4,537
Bob Kidd leaves NILP		
DUP gain from United Loyalist		

Newtownabbey C
Party	Candidate	1st Pref
Alliance	Claire Martin	1,128
UUP	Robert Caul	1,033
DUP	Samuel Neill	1,030
Alliance	George Jones	880
Unionist Party NI	Bertram Bickerstaff	689
Independent Community Party	Desmond Dowds	594
UUP	Letitia McCartney	552
Independent	Olive Shannon	90
Turnout		6,153
Bertram Bickerstaff leaves UUP		
Alliance gain from Independent Unionist		

Newtownabbey D
Party	Candidate	1st Pref
Alliance	John Drysdale	1,553
DUP	James Smith	1,343
UUP	Joseph Kell	952
Alliance	James Rooney	631
UUP	William McKee	625
UUP	James Michael	508
Turnout		5,780
William McKee joins UUP		
Alliance gain from UUP		

==== North Down ====
North Down A
Party	Candidate	1st Pref
Alliance	Bertie McConnell	1,372
Unionist Party NI	William Bailie	1,179
Ind. Unionist	Edmund Mills	836
DUP	Samuel Wilson	626
UUP	Thomas Barkley	471
Alliance	James Hamilton	415
Alliance	Clifford Creighton	366
UUP	Hugh Irvine	280
UUP	Lillie Navan	241
Turnout		5,907
Edmund Mills leaves UUP		
UPNI gain from UUP		

North Down B
Party	Candidate	1st Pref
Vanguard	George Green	823
Alliance	James Magee	781
DUP	James Boyle	598
UUP	John Shields	551
UUP	Bruce Mulligan	498
Alliance	John Hoy	489
UUP	Amy Corry	485
Progressive Unionist	William Ash	184
Progressive Unionist	William Alexander	184
Turnout		4,745
George Green joins Vanguard		
DUP gain from Loyalist		

North Down C
Party	Candidate	1st Pref
Alliance	William Morrow	721
Alliance	Thomas Rollins	637
UUP	Hazel Bradford	635
Alliance	Jane Copeland	631
Vanguard	Mary O'Fee	550
DUP	Robert Graham	401
Unionist Party NI	Frank Gill	369
UUP	Maisie McMullan	325
UUP	Archibald Pollock	251
Turnout		4,597
Mary O'Fee joins Vanguard		

North Down D
Party	Candidate	1st Pref
UUP	John Auld	1,042
Alliance	Keith Jones	921
UUUP	Frederick White	593
Alliance	Kenneth Kennedy	519
Alliance	Susan O'Brien	512
UUP	Thomas Bussell	254
Unionist Party NI	Robert Todd	213
UUP	Henry Clouston	187
Turnout		4,398
John Auld joins UUP		
UUUP gain from Loyalist		
UUP gain from Independent Unionist		

==== Omagh ====
Omagh A
Party	Candidate	1st Pref
SDLP	Liam McQuaid	1,218
Independent	Michael O'Hagan	917
UUP	Arthur McFarland	907
UUP	Cecil Anderson	740
SDLP	John Skelton	513
UUP	William Brunt	436
Alliance	Seamus McGale	394
Alliance	Anthony Pollock	104
Turnout		5,418
Cecil Anderson and Arthur McFarland join UUP		

Omagh B
Party	Candidate	1st Pref
UUP	Edgar McDowell	971
Community	Patrick Donnelly	737
UUP	Joseph Anderson	722
SDLP	Kevin McNaboe	676
Alliance	Patrick Bogan	629
Alliance	Patrick Donnelly	223
Turnout		4,182
Joseph Anderson and Edgar McDowell join UUP		

Omagh C
Party	Candidate	1st Pref
Alliance	Aidan Lagan	1,012
SDLP	Gerald McEnhill	930
UUP	Cecil Walker	881
SDLP	Stephen McKenna	702
UUP	Alfred Barnett	539
SDLP	Bernadette Grant	535
UUP	Harold McCauley	452
SDLP	Daniel Campbell	394
UUP	Archibald Burton	393
Alliance	Ethne McClelland	292
Turnout		6,407
Harold McCauley and Cecil Walker join UUP		
SDLP gain from Nationalist		
UUP gain from Independent Unionist		

Omagh D
Party	Candidate	1st Pref
UUP	John Johnston	857
Republican Clubs	Francis McElroy	801
SDLP	Brendan Martin	473
Alliance	John Hadden	417
Community	Michael McNulty	415
Independent	Bernard McGrath	380
Community	Patrick McCrory	258
SDLP	John McSherry	230
Turnout		3,982
John Johnson joins UUP		
Frank McElroy joins Republican Clubs		
SDLP gain from Community		

==== Strabane ====
Strabane A
Party	Candidate	1st Pref
DUP	George McIntyre	1,047
Independent	Denis McCrory	1,010
UUP	Edward Turner	758
UUP	Ernest Young	714
UUP	Frank Stewart	597
SDLP	Daniel Gallagher	518
Community Candidate	Brian MacBride	460
SDLP	Mary McCrea	304
Ind. Unionist	James Moore	205
Alliance	James Smyth	147
Turnout		6,026
Ernest Young joins UUP		
DUP gain from Independent Unionist		
UUP gain from Independent Unionist		

Strabane B
Party	Candidate	1st Pref
DUP	Samuel Rogers	1,237
UUP	Mary Britton	1,117
SDLP	John Gallagher	1,005
UUP	Henry Henderson	842
Independent	Francis McConnell	705
SDLP	Aidan McNamee	538
Independent	James McCormick	163
Independent	James Tinney	26
Turnout		5,847
Samuel Rogers joins DUP		
Mary Britton and Henry Henderson join UUP		
Independent gain from Alliance		

Strabane C
Party	Candidate	1st Pref
SDLP	Averill Cooper	1,457
SDLP	William Carlin	801
Independent	John O'Kane	592
UUP	Robert Fleming	582
SDLP	John McKelvey	516
UUP	Sydney Browne	357
Republican Clubs	Ivan Barr	317
Alliance	Herbert Cooper	312
Nationalist	John McCrory	198
Community Candidate	Thomas Forbes	146
Republican Clubs	Gerard McCafferty	67
Independent	James McDaid	57
Alliance	Mamie Quigley	51
Turnout		5,770
SDLP gain from Alliance		
UUP gain from Independent Unionist		
