= 1977 Carrickfergus Borough Council election =

Local government election in Northern Ireland

| ← 1973 | 18 May 1977 | 1981 → |

All 15 seats to Carrickfergus Borough Council 8 seats needed for a majority
| | First party | Second party | Third party |
|---|---|---|---|
| Party | Alliance | UUP | DUP |
| Seats won | 5 | 5 | 3 |
| Seat change | ▲2 | 0 | ▲3 |
| | Fourth party | Fifth party | Sixth party |
| Party | Unionist Party NI | United Loyalist | Loyalist |
| Seats won | 1 | 1 | 0 |
| Seat change | ▲1 | ▼4 | ▼1 |
| | Seventh party |
| Party | Independent |
| Seats won | 0 |
| Seat change | ▼1 |

Elections to Carrickfergus Borough Council were held on 18 May 1977 on the same day as the other Northern Irish local government elections. The election used three district electoral areas to elect a total of 15 councillors.

== Election results ==
Carrickfergus Borough Council Election Result 1977
| Party | Seats | Gains | Losses | Net gain/loss | Seats % | Votes % | Votes | +/− |
|---|---|---|---|---|---|---|---|---|
| Alliance | 5 | 2 | 0 | ▲2 | 33.3 | 30.1 | 2,957 | ▲7.8 |
| UUP | 5 | 0 | 0 | 0 | 33.3 | 27.5 | 2,698 | ▼0.8 |
| DUP | 3 | 3 | 0 | ▲3 | 20.0 | 17.6 | 1,735 | New |
| United Loyalist | 1 | 0 | 4 | ▼4 | 6.7 | 10.4 | 1,021 | ▼21.2 |
| Unionist Party NI | 1 | 1 | 0 | ▲1 | 0.0 | 10.1 | 992 | New |
| UUUP | 0 | 0 | 0 | 0 | 0.0 | 2.4 | 237 | New |
| Independent | 0 | 0 | 1 | ▼1 | 0.0 | 1.9 | 183 | ▼7.4 |

Note: "Votes" are the first preference votes.

== Districts summary ==
Results of the Carrickfergus Borough Council election, 1977 by district
| Ward | % | Cllrs | % | Cllrs | % | Cllrs | % | Cllrs | % | Cllrs | Total Cllrs |
| Ward | Alliance | | UUP | | DUP | | UPNI | | Others | | Total Cllrs |
|---|---|---|---|---|---|---|---|---|---|---|---|
| Area A | 29.9 | 2 | 29.2 | 2 | 12.1 | 0 | 10.4 | 0 | 18.4 | 1 | 5 |
| Area B | 36.6 | 2 | 38.6 | 2 | 12.2 | 1 | 0.0 | 0 | 12.6 | 0 | 5 |
| Area C | 23.3 | 1 | 13.8 | 1 | 28.9 | 2 | 20.7 | 1 | 13.3 | 0 | 5 |
| Total | 30.1 | 5 | 27.5 | 5 | 17.6 | 3 | 10.1 | 1 | 14.7 | 1 | 15 |

== Districts results ==
=== Area A ===
1973: 2 x UUP, 1 x United Loyalist, 1 x Alliance
1977: 2 x Alliance, 2 x UUP, 1 x United Loyalist
1973-1977 Change: Alliance gain from United Loyalist

Carrickfergus Area A - 5 seats
| Party | Candidate | FPv% | Count | | | | | | | |
| Party | Candidate | FPv% | 1 | 2 | 3 | 4 | 5 | 6 | 7 | 8 |
|---|---|---|---|---|---|---|---|---|---|---|
| Alliance | Joan Tomlin* | 22.67% | 709 | | | | | | | |
| United Loyalist | Charles Johnston* | 18.39% | 575 | | | | | | | |
| UUP | Mary Ardill | 12.25% | 383 | 387.16 | 389.77 | 414.39 | 476.19 | 562.19 | | |
| Alliance | Stewart Dickson | 7.26% | 227 | 383 | 384.89 | 394.67 | 399.63 | 519.97 | | |
| UUP | Robert Hunter | 7.45% | 233 | 235.08 | 236.61 | 275.96 | 371.1 | 458.42 | 486.15 | 494.41 |
| DUP | Joseph Seaton | 12.09% | 378 | 382.42 | 419.59 | 423.12 | 447.11 | 477.88 | 479.06 | 479.06 |
| Unionist Party NI | William Johnstone | 10.39% | 325 | 335.4 | 337.83 | 343.27 | 363.36 | | | |
| UUP | Robert McAllister* | 5.31% | 166 | 167.3 | 169.28 | 217.16 | | | | |
| UUP | Edward Simms* | 4.19% | 131 | 133.6 | 135.4 | | | | | |
Electorate: 5,868 Valid: 3,127 (53.29%) Spoilt: 140 Quota: 522 Turnout: 3,267 (55.67%)

=== Area B ===
1973: 2 x UUP, 1 x Alliance, 1 x United Loyalist, 1 x Independent
1977: 2 x UUP, 2 x Alliance, 1 x DUP
1973-1977 Change: Alliance and DUP gain from United Loyalist and Independent

Carrickfergus Area B - 5 seats
| Party | Candidate | FPv% | Count | | | | | | |
| Party | Candidate | FPv% | 1 | 2 | 3 | 4 | 5 | 6 | 7 |
|---|---|---|---|---|---|---|---|---|---|
| Alliance | Charles Hilditch | 21.44% | 745 | | | | | | |
| UUP | George Armstrong | 19.65% | 683 | | | | | | |
| DUP | Desmond Scott | 12.23% | 425 | 425.22 | 427.92 | 453.37 | 617.37 | | |
| Alliance | Patrick Conway | 7.80% | 271 | 349.1 | 350.15 | 367.38 | 369.75 | 370.57 | 617.57 |
| UUP | Hugh McLean* | 11.94% | 415 | 425.56 | 455.41 | 493.75 | 514.72 | 527.43 | 557.53 |
| UUP | David McCune* | 7.02% | 244 | 255.44 | 308.84 | 332.18 | 390.68 | 411.18 | 447.27 |
| Alliance | Alice Bateman | 7.37% | 256 | 306.38 | 309.83 | 341.35 | 348.09 | 351.37 | |
| United Loyalist | James Brown | 7.28% | 253 | 254.1 | 260.55 | 278.77 | | | |
| Independent | Elizabeth McMaster | 5.27% | 183 | 192.02 | 195.77 | | | | |
Electorate: 6,389 Valid: 3,475 (54.39%) Spoilt: 91 Quota: 580 Turnout: 3,566 (55.81%)

=== Area C ===
1973: 2 x United Loyalist, 1 x UUP, 1 x Alliance, 1 x Loyalist
1977: 2 x DUP, 1 x Alliance, 1 x UPNI, 1 x UUP
1973-1977 Change: DUP (two seats) and UPNI gain from United Loyalist (two seats) and Loyalist

Carrickfergus Area C - 5 seats
| Party | Candidate | FPv% | Count | | | | | | |
| Party | Candidate | FPv% | 1 | 2 | 3 | 4 | 5 | 6 | 7 |
|---|---|---|---|---|---|---|---|---|---|
| DUP | Ken McFaul* | 24.46% | 788 | | | | | | |
| Unionist Party NI | Samuel Murphy | 20.71% | 667 | | | | | | |
| DUP | John Moore | 4.47% | 144 | 313.57 | 320.17 | 421.38 | 430.11 | 608.11 | |
| UUP | Samuel Simms* | 7.39% | 238 | 242.96 | 282.16 | 294.29 | 493.93 | 557.93 | |
| Alliance | Sean Neeson | 12.26% | 395 | 396.55 | 412.55 | 414.95 | 423.06 | 435.78 | 444.78 |
| Alliance | Alison Lowry | 10.99% | 354 | 355.86 | 374.06 | 378.46 | 388.88 | 398.8 | 417.8 |
| UUUP | Gladys Ritchie* | 7.36% | 237 | 270.48 | 278.68 | 351.59 | 369.03 | | |
| UUP | James Penny | 6.36% | 205 | 209.34 | 244.14 | 253.27 | | | |
| United Loyalist | Ernest Burton* | 5.99% | 193 | 220.9 | 224.9 | | | | |
Electorate: 6,524 Valid: 3,221 (49.37%) Spoilt: 155 Quota: 537 Turnout: 3,376 (51.75%)
