= Antrim Area A =

District electoral areas in Antrim, Northern Ireland

Antrim Area A was one of the three district electoral areas in Antrim, Northern Ireland which existed from 1973 to 1985. The district elected five members to Antrim Borough Council and formed part of the South Antrim constituencies for the Northern Ireland Assembly and UK Parliament.

It was created for the 1973 local elections, and contained the wards of Cranfield, Drumanaway, Randalstown, Tardree and Toome. It was abolished for the 1985 local elections and replaced with the Antrim North West DEA.

== Councillors ==
Election	Councillor (Party)	Councillor (Party)	Councillor (Party)	Councillor (Party)	Councillor (Party)
1981	Wilson Clyde (DUP)	James Graham (UUP)	John Blakeley (UUP)	Robert Loughran (SDLP)	John Heffron (IIP)/ (Independent Nationalist)
1977	Stewart Dunlop (DUP)	James Graham (UUP)	Samuel Getty (UUP)	Gerard Berry (Independent)	John Heffron (IIP)/ (Independent Nationalist)
1973	Stewart Dunlop (DUP)	James Graham (UUP)	Bolton Minford (UUP)	Hugh O'Donnell (Independent)	John Heffron (IIP)/ (Independent Nationalist)

== 1981 Election ==
1977: 2 x UUP, 1 x DUP, 1 x Independent, 1 x Independent Nationalist

1981: 2 x UUP, 1 x DUP, 1 x SDLP, 1 x IIP

1977-1981 Change: SDLP gain from Independent, Independent Nationalist joins IIP

Antrim Area A - 5 seats
Party	Candidate	FPv%	Count										
Party	Candidate	FPv%	1	2	3	4	5	6	7	8	9	10	11
UUP	James Graham*	27.13%	1,293										
Irish Independence	John Heffron*	11.27%	537	538.14	540.14	545.14	609.14	609.14	959.14				
DUP	Wilson Clyde	11.18%	533	599.12	643.24	645.62	645.62	654.56	654.56	654.56	1,034.56		
UUP	John Blakeley*	4.34%	207	434.24	455.7	489.88	489.88	660.94	660.94	660.94	734.9	971.64	
SDLP	Robert Loughran	12.65%	603	603.76	605.14	632.52	645.52	648.9	666.9	721.9	722.66	723.54	728.82
SDLP	Gerard Carolan	9.00%	429	429.38	430.38	442.38	451.38	453.38	492.38	583.38	584.38	584.38	585.26
DUP	Frew Rainey	7.99%	381	432.68	467.28	470.28	470.28	481.4	481.4	482.4			
Irish Independence	Desmond McAteer	7.11%	339	339	339	340	418	418					
UUP	Mary Marshall	1.59%	76	175.94	187.12	210.92	210.92						
Irish Independence	James Totten	3.44%	164	164	164	167							
Alliance	James McConnell	2.37%	113	121.74	124.88								
Ind. Unionist	Stewart Dunlop*	1.91%	91	120.64									
Electorate: 6,381 Valid: 4,766 (74.69%) Spoilt: 135 Quota: 795 Turnout: 4,901 (76.81%)

== 1977 Election ==
1973: 2 x UUP, 1 x DUP, 1 x Independent, 1 x Independent Nationalist

1977: 2 x UUP, 1 x DUP, 1 x Independent, 1 x Independent Nationalist

1973-1977 Change: No change

Antrim Area A - 5 seats
Party	Candidate	FPv%	Count							
Party	Candidate	FPv%	1	2	3	4	5	6	7	8
UUP	James Graham*	24.03%	1,018							
Ind. Nationalist	John Heffron*	16.03%	679	680.2	682.5	761.5				
DUP	Stewart Dunlop*	11.78%	499	538.6	549.1	556.1	556.1	904.1		
UUP	Samuel Getty	3.97%	168	351	468	525.7	526.3	548.8	742.32	
Independent	Gerard Berry	12.79%	542	542	542	593.3	677.3	677.6	678.42	697.42
Independent	James Marrion	8.61%	365	365.9	367.2	378.2	594.5	594.5	596.96	631.92
DUP	James Brown	8.50%	360	374.4	379.9	383.5	383.5			
Independent	John McKeever	6.84%	290	290.6	290.9	311.8				
Alliance	Patrick Gribben	5.31%	225	229.2	237.8					
UUP	Moira Marshall	2.15%	91	150.1						
Electorate: 6,140 Valid: 4,237 (69.01%) Spoilt: 163 Quota: 707 Turnout: 4,400 (71.66%)

== 1973 Election ==
1973: 2 x UUP, 1 x DUP, 1 x Independent, 1 x Independent Nationalist

Antrim Area A - 5 seats
Party	Candidate	FPv%	Count				
Party	Candidate	FPv%	1	2	3	4	5
DUP	Stewart Dunlop	16.19%	748	756	836		
Ind. Nationalist	John Heffron	12.64%	584	632	634	634.81	939.81
Independent	Hugh O'Donnell	13.96%	645	719	724	724	837
UUP	Bolton Minford	13.03%	602	662	755	763.91	773.91
UUP	James Graham	10.32%	477	492	714	760.17	763.17
Independent	R. C. Rainey	8.81%	407	458	474	482.1	497.1
Independent	James Totten	8.48%	392	462	462	462.81	
UUP	John Blakeley	8.87%	410	423			
Alliance	Bill Simpson	5.15%	238				
Alliance	Bob McElroy	2.55%	118				
Electorate: 6,461 Valid: 4,621 (71.52%) Spoilt: 87 Quota: 771 Turnout: 4,708 (72.87%)
