= 1973 Carrickfergus Borough Council election =

Local government election in Northern Ireland

30 May 1973	1977 →

All 15 seats to Carrickfergus Borough Council 8 seats needed for a majority
	First party	Second party	Third party
Party	United Loyalist	UUP	Alliance
Seats won	5	5	3
	Fourth party	Fifth party
Party	Loyalist	Independent
Seats won	1	1

Elections to Carrickfergus Borough Council were held on 30 May 1973 on the same day as the other Northern Irish local government elections. The election used three district electoral areas to elect a total of 15 councillors.

== Election results ==
Party	Seats	±	First Pref. votes	FPv%	±%
United Loyalist	5		3,843	31.6%	
UUP	5		3,440	28.3%	
Alliance	3		2,716	22.3%	
Independent	1		1,129	9.3%	
Loyalist	1		559	4.6%	
NI Labour	0		472	3.9%	
Totals	15		12,159	100.0%	—

== Districts summary ==
Results of the Carrickfergus Borough Council election, 1973 by district
Ward	%	Cllrs	%	Cllrs	%	Cllrs	Total Cllrs
Ward	UUP		Alliance		Others		Total Cllrs
Area A	39.8	2	26.6	1	33.6	2	5
Area B	25.1	2	25.5	1	49.4	2	5
Area C	20.8	1	15.2	1	64.0	3	5
Total	28.3	5	22.3	3	49.4	7	15

== Districts results ==
=== Area A ===
1973: 2 x UUP, 1 x United Loyalist, 1 x Alliance

Carrickfergus Area A - 5 seats
Party	Candidate	FPv%	Count					
Party	Candidate	FPv%	1	2	3	4	5	6
UUP	Robert McAllister	16.68%	646					
UUP	Edward Simms	12.03%	466	468	482	807		
United Loyalist	Charles Johnston	15.00%	581	586	591	618	669	
United Loyalist	Robert Gordon	15.34%	594	599	603	633	681	
Alliance	Joan Tomlin	10.72%	415	461	577	603	634.2	638.4
Alliance	Alison Lowry	8.86%	343	386	528	555	585	590.4
UUP	C. W. W. Torrance	11.05%	428	430	443			
Alliance	H. Munnis	7.07%	274	294				
NI Labour	P. V. Cachart	3.25%	126					
Electorate: 5,759 Valid: 3,873 (67.25%) Spoilt: 70 Quota: 646 Turnout: 3,943 (68.47%)

=== Area B ===
1973: 2 x UUP, 1 x Alliance, 1 x United Loyalist, 1 x Independent

Carrickfergus Area B - 5 seats
Party	Candidate	FPv%	Count				
Party	Candidate	FPv%	1	2	3	4	5
United Loyalist	J. Craig	29.81%	1,231				
UUP	David McCune	14.04%	580	853.24			
UUP	Hugh McLean	11.02%	455	581.5	707.5		
Alliance	R. Lorimer	15.33%	633	649.56	650.96	707.96	
Independent	S. Campbell	9.88%	408	495.86	513.22	517.98	731.98
Alliance	E. McGowan	10.15%	419	429.58	433.22	499.18	529.18
Independent	S. Niblock	6.17%	255	275.24	282.8	299.48	
NI Labour	H. McKeown	3.61%	149	155.9	158.98		
Electorate: 6,154 Valid: 4,130 (67.11%) Spoilt: 49 Quota: 689 Turnout: 4,179 (67.91%)

=== Area C ===
1973: 2 x United Loyalist, 1 x UUP, 1 x Alliance, 1 x Loyalist

Carrickfergus Area C - 5 seats
Party	Candidate	FPv%	Count											
Party	Candidate	FPv%	1	2	3	4	5	6	7	8	9	10	11	12
United Loyalist	Gladys Ritchie	18.98%	789											
United Loyalist	Ken McFaul	12.42%	516	566.88	574	575	586.36	707.36						
Alliance	W. Black	10.83%	450	450.36	451.36	453.36	460.36	460.84	550.84	748.84				
UUP	Samuel Simms	8.76%	364	367.72	372.72	373.72	395.84	400.6	405.72	417.84	434.94	563.66	566.72	838.72
Loyalist	Ernest Burton	13.45%	559	567.04	587.28	589.4	596.52	615.32	621.32	623.8	626.05	643.98	653.33	685.45
Independent	T. Patterson	7.56%	314	314.6	318.6	318.6	336.84	337.92	356.92	364.52	387.47	404.1	404.44	440.09
UUP	T. Wilson	6.16%	256	258.4	259.4	260.4	273.4	277.84	279.84	285.08	291.83	398.07	399.43	
UUP	S. Steele	5.90%	245	246.92	248.92	248.92	259.92	263.48	267.48	271.48	277.33			
Alliance	P. Wallace	4.38%	182	183.56	187.56	193.56	202.68	205.52	239.52					
NI Labour	R. Binnie	3.42%	142	142	144	183	184.12							
United Loyalist	E. Loughlin	3.18%	132	154.8	155.92	157.04	163.16							
Independent	J. Henderson	2.43%	101	102.08	104.08	106.08								
NI Labour	J. Polley	1.32%	55	55.24	55.24									
Independent	J. Hunter	1.23%	51	51.48										
Electorate: 6,578 Valid: 4,156 (63.18%) Spoilt: 69 Quota: 693 Turnout: 4,225 (64.23%)
