= Antrim Area B =

District electoral areas in Antrim, Northern Ireland

Antrim Area B was one of the three district electoral areas in Antrim, Northern Ireland which existed from 1973 to 1985. The district elected five members to Antrim Borough Council and formed part of the South Antrim constituencies for the Northern Ireland Assembly and UK Parliament.

It was created for the 1973 local elections, and contained the wards of Aldergrove, Ballyrobin, Crumlin, Parkgate and Templepatrick. It was abolished for the 1985 local elections and replaced with the Antrim South East DEA.

== Councillors ==
Election	Councillor (Party)	Councillor (Party)	Councillor (Party)	Councillor (Party)	Councillor (Party)
1981	Edgar Wallace (UUP)	James Cunningham (UUP)	Thomas Grant (UUP)	Roy Thompson (DUP)	Robert Burns (SDLP)
1977	Edgar Wallace (UUP)	James Cunningham (UUP)	George Dundas (UUP)	Allister Lucas (DUP)	John McCourt (Alliance)
1973	Edgar Wallace (UUP)	Robert Erwin (UUP)	George Dundas (UUP)	Alexander Wilson (UUP)	John McCourt (Alliance)

== 1981 Election ==
1977: 3 x UUP, 1 x DUP, 1 x Alliance

1981: 3 x UUP, 1 x DUP, 1 x SDLP

1977-1981 Change: SDLP gain from Alliance

Antrim Area B - 5 seats
Party	Candidate	FPv%	Count					
Party	Candidate	FPv%	1	2	3	4	5	6
UUP	Edgar Wallace*	16.66%	688	691				
UUP	James Cunningham*	16.56%	684	688	790			
SDLP	Robert Burns	15.45%	638	640	641	699		
UUP	Thomas Grant	9.64%	398	402	501	654	740	
DUP	Roy Thompson	14.21%	587	594	616	638	642	662
DUP	Allister Lucas*	13.41%	554	556	570	579	582	600
Alliance	John McCourt*	4.72%	195	302	310			
UUP	Alexander Wilson	6.10%	252	253				
Alliance	George Luke	3.24%	134					
Electorate: 5,966 Valid: 4,130 (69.23%) Spoilt: 121 Quota: 689 Turnout: 4,251 (71.25%)

== 1977 Election ==
1973: 4 x UUP, 1 x Alliance

1977: 3 x UUP, 1 x DUP, 1 x Alliance

1973-1977 Change: DUP gain from UUP

Antrim Area B - 5 seats
Party	Candidate	FPv%	Count					
Party	Candidate	FPv%	1	2	3	4	5	6
Alliance	John McCourt*	13.88%	394	397	605			
UUP	James Cunningham	15.71%	446	455	460	502		
UUP	Edgar Wallace*	16.17%	459	467	470	497		
UUP	George Dundas*	10.78%	306	308	313	337	357.25	488.25
DUP	Allister Lucas	9.37%	266	448	453	459	459	476
UUP	William Jones	9.51%	270	275	279	291	294	399
UUP	Alexander Wilson*	8.63%	245	247	247	265	269.5	
Alliance	George Luke	8.31%	236	237				
DUP	John Patterson	7.64%	217					
Electorate: 5,907 Valid: 2,839 (48.06%) Spoilt: 127 Quota: 474 Turnout: 2,966 (50.21%)

== 1973 Election ==
1973: 4 x UUP, 1 x Alliance

Antrim Area B - 5 seats
Party	Candidate	FPv%	Count						
Party	Candidate	FPv%	1	2	3	4	5	6	7
UUP	Edgar Wallace	19.90%	832						
UUP	George Dundas	14.69%	614	629.84	635.32	722.32			
UUP	Robert Erwin	15.31%	640	669.92	680.88	705.88			
Alliance	John McCourt	6.70%	280	280.8	452.24	498.88	782.88		
UUP	Alexander Wilson	10.64%	445	492.84	503.12	524.76	543.76	597.96	606.76
UUP	William Jones	12.32%	515	545.72	555.52	564.32	566.48	581.48	597.32
SDLP	Francis O'Brien	8.20%	343	343.16	357.16	420.16			
NI Labour	William Gregg	6.86%	287	288.76	300.56				
Alliance	Patricia MacKean	5.38%	225	230.76					
Electorate: 6,211 Valid: 4,181 (67.32%) Spoilt: 55 Quota: 697 Turnout: 4,236 (68.20%)
