= 1981 Carrickfergus Borough Council election =

Local government election in Northern Ireland

← 1977	20 May 1981	1985 →

All 15 seats to Carrickfergus Borough Council 8 seats needed for a majority
	First party	Second party	Third party
Party	DUP	UUP	Alliance
Seats won	7	3	3
Seat change	▲4	▼2	▼2
	Fourth party	Fifth party	Sixth party
Party	United Loyalist	Ind. Unionist	Unionist Party NI
Seats won	1	1	0
Seat change	0	▲1	▼1

Elections to Carrickfergus Borough Council were held on 20 May 1981 on the same day as the other Northern Irish local government elections. The election used three district electoral areas to elect a total of 15 councillors.

== Election results ==
Carrickfergus Borough Council Election Result 1981
Party	Seats	Gains	Losses	Net gain/loss	Seats %	Votes %	Votes	+/−
DUP	7	4	0	▲4	46.7	36.6	4,399	▲19.0
UUP	3	0	2	▼2	20.0	22.6	2,717	▼4.9
Alliance	3	0	2	▼2	20.0	21.8	2,618	▼8.3
United Loyalist	1	0	0	0	6.7	6.8	819	▲1.8
Ind. Unionist	1	1	0	▲1	6.7	4.4	526	▲4.4
Unionist Party NI	0	0	1	▼1	0.0	3.2	383	▼6.9
PUP	0	0	0	0	0.0	2.9	353	New
UPUP	0	0	0	0	0.0	1.0	122	New
Newtownabbey Labour Party	0	0	0	0	0.0	0.7	85	New

Note: "Votes" are the first preference votes.

== Districts summary ==
Results of the Carrickfergus Borough Council election, 1981 by district
Ward	%	Cllrs	%	Cllrs	%	Cllrs	%	Cllrs	Total Cllrs
Ward	DUP		UUP		Alliance		Others		Total Cllrs
Area A	27.4	2	20.0	1	22.2	1	30.4	1	5
Area B	34.4	2	35.4	2	25.0	1	5.2	0	5
Area C	47.1	3	12.9	0	18.3	1	21.7	1	5
Total	36.6	7	22.6	3	21.8	3	19.0	2	15

== Districts results ==
=== Area A ===
1977: 2 x Alliance, 2 x UUP, 1 x United Loyalist
1981: 2 x DUP, 1 x Alliance, 1 x UUP, 1 x United Loyalist
1977-1981 Change: DUP (two seats) gain from Alliance and UUP

Carrickfergus Area A - 5 seats
Party	Candidate	FPv%	Count						
Party	Candidate	FPv%	1	2	3	4	5	6	7
United Loyalist	Charles Johnston*	21.11%	819						
UUP	Mary Ardill*	11.81%	458	475.4	585.69	587.92	695.92		
Alliance	Joan Tomlin*	13.20%	512	541.21	542.21	634.44	646.82	847.82	
DUP	William Haggan	14.41%	559	589.59	594.05	596.28	625.27	633.5	637.5
DUP	Samuel Irvine	12.99%	504	550.69	551.92	554.15	576.83	590.75	598.75
Unionist Party NI	Anne Dickson	9.10%	353	366.8	372.49	373.49	390.56	411.63	502.63
Alliance	Stewart Dickson*	5.36%	208	213.52	216.52	257.52	263.44		
UUP	Ernest Burton	4.85%	188	203.64	217.25	220.25			
Alliance	Robert Gordon	3.74%	145	145.92	145.92				
UUP	Mary Anderson	3.43%	133	142.2					
Electorate: 6,062 Valid: 3,879 (63.99%) Spoilt: 98 Quota: 647 Turnout: 3,977 (65.61%)

=== Area B ===
1977: 2 x UUP, 2 x Alliance, 1 x DUP
1981: 2 x UUP, 2 x DUP, 1 x Alliance
1977-1981 Change: DUP gain from Alliance

Carrickfergus Area B - 5 seats
Party	Candidate	FPv%	Count								
Party	Candidate	FPv%	1	2	3	4	5	6	7	8	9
DUP	William Cross	18.98%	748								
UUP	Hugh McLean*	17.79%	701								
UUP	James Brown	14.92%	588	590.64	606.18	608.24	687.24				
Alliance	Patrick Conway*	11.32%	446	446.84	448.28	469.28	472.18	498.54	501.74	694.74	
DUP	William Knox	9.11%	359	433.52	437.24	438.3	454.88	483.6	495.76	500.94	749.94
Alliance	Charles Hilditch*	7.79%	307	308.2	312.82	340.82	347.6	368.32	374.08	433.06	439.06
DUP	Steven Watters	6.32%	249	256.8	259.2	259.2	265.52	274.82	280.58	285.58	
Alliance	Alice Bateman	5.86%	231	231	231.42	249.42	250.72	277.02	280.22		
UPUP	Robert Wilson	3.10%	122	122.6	124.34	131.4	134.02				
UUP	Henry Cardwell	2.66%	105	106.2	117	123					
Newtownabbey Labour	Richard Hopkins	2.16%	85	85	85.18						
Electorate: 6,627 Valid: 3,941 (59.47%) Spoilt: 133 Quota: 657 Turnout: 4,074 (61.48%)

=== Area C ===
1977: 2 x DUP, 1 x Alliance, 1 x UPNI, 1 x UUP
1981: 3 x DUP, 1 x Alliance, 1 x Independent Unionist
1977-1981 Change: DUP gain from UUP, Independent Unionist leaves UPNI

Carrickfergus Area C - 5 seats
Party	Candidate	FPv%	Count							
Party	Candidate	FPv%	1	2	3	4	5	6	7	8
DUP	Ken McFaul*	37.41%	1,572							
DUP	William McKeown	5.74%	241	816.12						
Alliance	Sean Neeson*	15.78%	663	692.68	694.99	787.99				
Ind. Unionist	Samuel Murphy*	12.52%	526	561.28	564.14	578.37	602.37	623.17	675.66	722.66
DUP	James Strange	3.97%	167	312.04	410.05	417.5	425.5	433.85	447.77	561.86
UUP	Elizabeth Carson	5.47%	230	245.12	246.99	257.1	268.1	327.23	454.28	509.77
PUP	Samuel Stewart	8.40%	353	382.12	385.86	386.86	391.86	402.88	419	
UUP	Robert Hunter*	3.78%	159	178.6	180.03	185.37	194.37	263.73		
UUP	John Haslett	3.69%	155	171.24	172.01	176.79	181.79			
Alliance	Arthur McQuitty	2.52%	106	109.36	110.57					
Ind. Unionist	Edwin Cummings	0.71%	30	30.56	30.89					
Electorate: 6,939 Valid: 4,202 (60.56%) Spoilt: 165 Quota: 701 Turnout: 4,367 (62.93%)
