= 1973 Antrim District Council election =

Local government election in Northern Ireland

30 May 1973	1977 →

All 15 seats to Antrim District Council 8 seats needed for a majority
	First party	Second party	Third party
Party	UUP	Alliance	Vanguard
Seats won	9	2	1
	Fourth party	Fifth party	Sixth party
Party	DUP	Independent	Ind. Nationalist
Seats won	1	1	1

Elections to Antrim District Council were held on 30 May 1973 on the same day as the other Northern Irish local government elections. The election used three district electoral areas to elect a total of 15 councillors.

== Election results ==
Party	Seats	±	First Pref. votes	FPv%	±%
UUP	9		7,038	49.4	
Alliance	2		2,291	16.1	
Independent	1		2,079	14.6	
Vanguard	1		866	6.1	
DUP	1		748	5.3	
Ind. Nationalist	1		584	4.1	
SDLP	0		343	2.4	
NI Labour	0		287	2.0	
Totals	15		14,236	100.0	—

== Districts summary ==
Results of the Antrim District Council election, 1973 by district
Ward	%	Cllrs	%	Cllrs	%	Cllrs	%	Cllrs	%	Cllrs	Total Cllrs
Ward	UUP		Alliance		Vanguard		DUP		Others		Total Cllrs
Area A	32.2	2	7.7	0	0.0	0	16.2	1	43.9	2	5
Area B	72.9	4	12.1	1	0.0	0	0.0	0	15.0	0	5
Area C	46.1	3	26.3	1	15.9	1	0.0	0	11.7	0	5
Total	49.4	9	16.1	2	6.1	1	5.3	1	23.1	2	15

== Districts results ==
=== Area A ===
1973: 2 x UUP, 1 x DUP, 1 x Independent, 1 x Independent Nationalist

Antrim Area A - 5 seats
Party	Candidate	FPv%	Count				
Party	Candidate	FPv%	1	2	3	4	5
DUP	Stewart Dunlop	16.19%	748	756	836		
Ind. Nationalist	John Heffron	12.64%	584	632	634	634.81	939.81
Independent	Hugh O'Donnell	13.96%	645	719	724	724	837
UUP	Bolton Minford	13.03%	602	662	755	763.91	773.91
UUP	James Graham	10.32%	477	492	714	760.17	763.17
Independent	R. C. Rainey	8.81%	407	458	474	482.1	497.1
Independent	James Totten	8.48%	392	462	462	462.81	
UUP	John Blakeley	8.87%	410	423			
Alliance	Bill Simpson	5.15%	238				
Alliance	Bob McElroy	2.55%	118				
Electorate: 6,461 Valid: 4,621 (71.52%) Spoilt: 87 Quota: 771 Turnout: 4,708 (72.87%)

=== Area B ===
1973: 4 x UUP, 1 x Alliance

Antrim Area B - 5 seats
Party	Candidate	FPv%	Count						
Party	Candidate	FPv%	1	2	3	4	5	6	7
UUP	Edgar Wallace	19.90%	832						
UUP	George Dundas	14.69%	614	629.84	635.32	722.32			
UUP	Robert Erwin	15.31%	640	669.92	680.88	705.88			
Alliance	John McCourt	6.70%	280	280.8	452.24	498.88	782.88		
UUP	Alexander Wilson	10.64%	445	492.84	503.12	524.76	543.76	597.96	606.76
UUP	William Jones	12.32%	515	545.72	555.52	564.32	566.48	581.48	597.32
SDLP	Francis O'Brien	8.20%	343	343.16	357.16	420.16			
NI Labour	William Gregg	6.86%	287	288.76	300.56				
Alliance	Patricia MacKean	5.38%	225	230.76					
Electorate: 6,211 Valid: 4,181 (67.32%) Spoilt: 55 Quota: 697 Turnout: 4,236 (68.20%)

=== Area C ===
1973: 3 x UUP, 1 x Alliance, 1 x Vanguard

Antrim Area C - 5 seats
Party	Candidate	FPv%	Count									
Party	Candidate	FPv%	1	2	3	4	5	6	7	8	9	10
Alliance	Michael O'Donoghue	17.28%	939									
UUP	Samuel McCombe	14.89%	809	809.18	810.24	874.24	876.24	899.27	908.27			
Vanguard	James Clarke	9.85%	535	535.06	536.06	538.06	541.06	566.06	878.06	936.06		
UUP	James Craig	10.01%	544	544.06	547.06	572.06	573.09	600.09	609.09	694.18	700.18	947.21
UUP	Jack Allen	8.63%	469	469.15	470.27	504.27	507.3	548.3	553.3	600.36	613.11	895.92
Alliance	William Gawn	3.28%	178	182.41	298.83	300.83	479.72	513.14	514.14	696.4	699.4	733.43
UUP	William Clarke	9.33%	507	507.06	510.09	522.09	525.09	541.09	544.09	599.12	607.37	
Independent	Thomas Simpson	7.31%	397	398.29	399.5	412.5	418.65	490.86	497.86			
Vanguard	David McCreight	6.09%	331	331	331	336	337	349				
Independent	Peter Neish	4.38%	238	238.39	240.48	257.48	256.69					
Alliance	Charlie Greer	3.11%	169	172.36	203.49	206.49						
UUP	R. W. Rutherford-Browne	3.20%	174	174	176							
Alliance	Alan Finlay	2.65%	144	162.06								
Electorate: 9,206 Valid: 5,434 (59.03%) Spoilt: 89 Quota: 906 Turnout: 5,523 (59.99%)
