= William Annon =

Northern Irish politician (1912–1983)

Member of Belfast City Council
- In office 18 May 1977 – 19 October 1983
- Preceded by: Mary Creighton
- Succeeded by: Alfie Redpath
- Constituency: Belfast Area H

Member of the Constitutional Convention for North Belfast
- In office 1975–1976

Personal details
- Born: 4 June 1912 Lisnaskea, County Fermanagh, Northern Ireland
- Died: 19 October 1983 (aged 71) Belfast, Northern Ireland
- Party: Democratic Unionist (from 1975)
- Other political affiliations: Ulster Unionist Party (until 1973)

William Thomas Annon (4 June 1912 – 19 October 1983) was a Northern Irish unionist politician.

== Background ==
Annon was born in Lisnaskea, County Fermanagh. He first became prominent as a member of the Ulster Unionist Party, becoming the chairman of its Sydenham branch, in Belfast. He stood as an independent loyalist in East Belfast at the 1973 Northern Ireland Assembly election, taking 2,192 votes, and was not elected.

He then joined the Democratic Unionist Party, and stood for it in North Belfast for the Northern Ireland Constitutional Convention; he took 4,132 first-preference votes and was the last candidate elected.

Annon was also prominent in the Apprentice Boys of Derry, and represented it on the United Unionist Action Council. At the 1977 Northern Ireland local elections, he was elected in Belfast Area H, and he held his seat in 1981.

== Death ==
He died in October 1983 in Belfast, still serving on the council.

Northern Ireland Constitutional Convention
New convention	Member for North Belfast; 1975–1976	Convention dissolved
