= Carrickfergus Area C =

District electoral areas in Carrickfergus, Northern Ireland

Carrickfergus Area C was one of the three district electoral areas in Carrickfergus, Northern Ireland which existed from 1973 to 1985. The district elected five members to Carrickfergus Borough Council, and formed part of the North Antrim constituencies for the Northern Ireland Assembly and UK Parliament.

It was created for the 1973 local elections, and contained the wards of Castle, Clipperstown, Love Lane, Northland and Sunnylands. It was abolished for the 1985 local elections and replaced by the Carrick Castle DEA.

== Councillors ==
Election	Councillor (Party)	Councillor (Party)	Councillor (Party)	Councillor (Party)	Councillor (Party)
1981	Ken McFaul (DUP)/ (United Loyalist)	William McKeown (DUP)	James Strange (DUP)	Samuel Murphy (Independent Unionist)/ (UPNI)	Séan Neeson (Alliance)
1977	Ken McFaul (DUP)/ (United Loyalist)	John Moore (DUP)	Samuel Simms (UUP)	Samuel Murphy (Independent Unionist)/ (UPNI)	Séan Neeson (Alliance)
1973	Ken McFaul (DUP)/ (United Loyalist)	Gladys Ritchie (United Loyalist)	Samuel Simms (UUP)	Ernest Burton (Loyalist)	W. Black (Alliance)

== 1981 Election ==
1977: 2 x DUP, 1 x Alliance, 1 x UPNI, 1 x UUP

1981: 3 x DUP, 1 x Alliance, 1 x Independent Unionist

1977-1981 Change: DUP gain from UUP, Independent Unionist leaves UPNI

Carrickfergus Area C - 5 seats
Party	Candidate	FPv%	Count							
Party	Candidate	FPv%	1	2	3	4	5	6	7	8
DUP	Ken McFaul*	37.41%	1,572							
DUP	William McKeown	5.74%	241	816.12						
Alliance	Sean Neeson*	15.78%	663	692.68	694.99	787.99				
Ind. Unionist	Samuel Murphy*	12.52%	526	561.28	564.14	578.37	602.37	623.17	675.66	722.66
DUP	James Strange	3.97%	167	312.04	410.05	417.5	425.5	433.85	447.77	561.86
UUP	Elizabeth Carson	5.47%	230	245.12	246.99	257.1	268.1	327.23	454.28	509.77
PUP	Samuel Stewart	8.40%	353	382.12	385.86	386.86	391.86	402.88	419	
UUP	Robert Hunter*	3.78%	159	178.6	180.03	185.37	194.37	263.73		
UUP	John Haslett	3.69%	155	171.24	172.01	176.79	181.79			
Alliance	Arthur McQuitty	2.52%	106	109.36	110.57					
Ind. Unionist	Edwin Cummings	0.71%	30	30.56	30.89					
Electorate: 6,939 Valid: 4,202 (60.56%) Spoilt: 165 Quota: 701 Turnout: 4,367 (62.93%)

== 1977 Election ==
1973: 2 x United Loyalist, 1 x UUP, 1 x Alliance, 1 x Loyalist

1977: 2 x DUP, 1 x Alliance, 1 x UPNI, 1 x UUP

1973-1977 Change: DUP (two seats) and UPNI gain from United Loyalist (two seats) and Loyalist

Carrickfergus Area C - 5 seats
Party	Candidate	FPv%	Count						
Party	Candidate	FPv%	1	2	3	4	5	6	7
DUP	Ken McFaul*	24.46%	788						
Unionist Party NI	Samuel Murphy	20.71%	667						
DUP	John Moore	4.47%	144	313.57	320.17	421.38	430.11	608.11	
UUP	Samuel Simms*	7.39%	238	242.96	282.16	294.29	493.93	557.93	
Alliance	Sean Neeson	12.26%	395	396.55	412.55	414.95	423.06	435.78	444.78
Alliance	Alison Lowry	10.99%	354	355.86	374.06	378.46	388.88	398.8	417.8
UUUP	Gladys Ritchie*	7.36%	237	270.48	278.68	351.59	369.03		
UUP	James Penny	6.36%	205	209.34	244.14	253.27			
United Loyalist	Ernest Burton*	5.99%	193	220.9	224.9				
Electorate: 6,524 Valid: 3,221 (49.37%) Spoilt: 155 Quota: 537 Turnout: 3,376 (51.75%)

== 1973 Election ==
1973: 2 x United Loyalist, 1 x UUP, 1 x Alliance, 1 x Loyalist

Carrickfergus Area C - 5 seats
Party	Candidate	FPv%	Count											
Party	Candidate	FPv%	1	2	3	4	5	6	7	8	9	10	11	12
United Loyalist	Gladys Ritchie	18.98%	789											
United Loyalist	Ken McFaul	12.42%	516	566.88	574	575	586.36	707.36						
Alliance	W. Black	10.83%	450	450.36	451.36	453.36	460.36	460.84	550.84	748.84				
UUP	Samuel Simms	8.76%	364	367.72	372.72	373.72	395.84	400.6	405.72	417.84	434.94	563.66	566.72	838.72
Loyalist	Ernest Burton	13.45%	559	567.04	587.28	589.4	596.52	615.32	621.32	623.8	626.05	643.98	653.33	685.45
Independent	T. Patterson	7.56%	314	314.6	318.6	318.6	336.84	337.92	356.92	364.52	387.47	404.1	404.44	440.09
UUP	T. Wilson	6.16%	256	258.4	259.4	260.4	273.4	277.84	279.84	285.08	291.83	398.07	399.43	
UUP	S. Steele	5.90%	245	246.92	248.92	248.92	259.92	263.48	267.48	271.48	277.33			
Alliance	P. Wallace	4.38%	182	183.56	187.56	193.56	202.68	205.52	239.52					
NI Labour	R. Binnie	3.42%	142	142	144	183	184.12							
United Loyalist	E. Loughlin	3.18%	132	154.8	155.92	157.04	163.16							
Independent	J. Henderson	2.43%	101	102.08	104.08	106.08								
NI Labour	J. Polley	1.32%	55	55.24	55.24									
Independent	J. Hunter	1.23%	51	51.48										
Electorate: 6,578 Valid: 4,156 (63.18%) Spoilt: 69 Quota: 693 Turnout: 4,225 (64.23%)
