= Carrickfergus Area A =

District electoral areas in Carrickfergus, Northern Ireland

Carrickfergus Area A was one of the three district electoral areas in Carrickfergus, Northern Ireland which existed from 1973 to 1985. The district elected five members to Carrickfergus Borough Council, and formed part of the South Antrim constituencies for the Northern Ireland Assembly and UK Parliament.

It was created for the 1973 local elections, and contained the wards of Knockagh, Lower Greenisland, Middle Greenisland, Trooperslane and Woodburn. It was abolished for the 1985 local elections and replaced by the Knockagh Monument DEA.

== Councillors ==
| Election | Councillor (Party) | Councillor (Party) | Councillor (Party) | Councillor (Party) | Councillor (Party) |
|---|---|---|---|---|---|
| 1981 | Charles Johnston (United Loyalist) | William Haggan (DUP) | Samuel Irvine (DUP) | Mary Ardill (UUP) | Joan Tomlin (Alliance) |
| 1977 | Charles Johnston (United Loyalist) | Stewart Dickson (Alliance) | Robert Hunter (UUP) | Mary Ardill (UUP) | Joan Tomlin (Alliance) |
| 1973 | Charles Johnston (United Loyalist) | Robert Gordon (United Loyalist) | Robert McAllister (UUP) | Edward Simms (UUP) | Joan Tomlin (Alliance) |

== 1981 Election ==
1977: 2 x Alliance, 2 x UUP, 1 x United Loyalist

1981: 2 x DUP, 1 x Alliance, 1 x UUP, 1 x United Loyalist

1977-1981 Change: DUP (two seats) gain from Alliance and UUP

Carrickfergus Area A - 5 seats
| Party | Candidate | FPv% | Count | | | | | | |
| Party | Candidate | FPv% | 1 | 2 | 3 | 4 | 5 | 6 | 7 |
|---|---|---|---|---|---|---|---|---|---|
| United Loyalist | Charles Johnston* | 21.11% | 819 | | | | | | |
| UUP | Mary Ardill* | 11.81% | 458 | 475.4 | 585.69 | 587.92 | 695.92 | | |
| Alliance | Joan Tomlin* | 13.20% | 512 | 541.21 | 542.21 | 634.44 | 646.82 | 847.82 | |
| DUP | William Haggan | 14.41% | 559 | 589.59 | 594.05 | 596.28 | 625.27 | 633.5 | 637.5 |
| DUP | Samuel Irvine | 12.99% | 504 | 550.69 | 551.92 | 554.15 | 576.83 | 590.75 | 598.75 |
| Unionist Party NI | Anne Dickson | 9.10% | 353 | 366.8 | 372.49 | 373.49 | 390.56 | 411.63 | 502.63 |
| Alliance | Stewart Dickson* | 5.36% | 208 | 213.52 | 216.52 | 257.52 | 263.44 | | |
| UUP | Ernest Burton | 4.85% | 188 | 203.64 | 217.25 | 220.25 | | | |
| Alliance | Robert Gordon | 3.74% | 145 | 145.92 | 145.92 | | | | |
| UUP | Mary Anderson | 3.43% | 133 | 142.2 | | | | | |
Electorate: 6,062 Valid: 3,879 (63.99%) Spoilt: 98 Quota: 647 Turnout: 3,977 (65.61%)

== 1977 Election ==
1973: 2 x UUP, 1 x United Loyalist, 1 x Alliance

1977: 2 x Alliance, 2 x UUP, 1 x United Loyalist

1973-1977 Change: Alliance gain from United Loyalist

Carrickfergus Area A - 5 seats
| Party | Candidate | FPv% | Count | | | | | | | |
| Party | Candidate | FPv% | 1 | 2 | 3 | 4 | 5 | 6 | 7 | 8 |
|---|---|---|---|---|---|---|---|---|---|---|
| Alliance | Joan Tomlin* | 22.67% | 709 | | | | | | | |
| United Loyalist | Charles Johnston* | 18.39% | 575 | | | | | | | |
| UUP | Mary Ardill | 12.25% | 383 | 387.16 | 389.77 | 414.39 | 476.19 | 562.19 | | |
| Alliance | Stewart Dickson | 7.26% | 227 | 383 | 384.89 | 394.67 | 399.63 | 519.97 | | |
| UUP | Robert Hunter | 7.45% | 233 | 235.08 | 236.61 | 275.96 | 371.1 | 458.42 | 486.15 | 494.41 |
| DUP | Joseph Seaton | 12.09% | 378 | 382.42 | 419.59 | 423.12 | 447.11 | 477.88 | 479.06 | 479.06 |
| Unionist Party NI | William Johnstone | 10.39% | 325 | 335.4 | 337.83 | 343.27 | 363.36 | | | |
| UUP | Robert McAllister* | 5.31% | 166 | 167.3 | 169.28 | 217.16 | | | | |
| UUP | Edward Simms* | 4.19% | 131 | 133.6 | 135.4 | | | | | |
Electorate: 5,868 Valid: 3,127 (53.29%) Spoilt: 140 Quota: 522 Turnout: 3,267 (55.67%)

=== Area A ===
1973: 2 x UUP, 1 x United Loyalist, 1 x Alliance

Carrickfergus Area A - 5 seats
| Party | Candidate | FPv% | Count | | | | | |
| Party | Candidate | FPv% | 1 | 2 | 3 | 4 | 5 | 6 |
|---|---|---|---|---|---|---|---|---|
| UUP | Robert McAllister | 16.68% | 646 | | | | | |
| UUP | Edward Simms | 12.03% | 466 | 468 | 482 | 807 | | |
| United Loyalist | Charles Johnston | 15.00% | 581 | 586 | 591 | 618 | 669 | |
| United Loyalist | Robert Gordon | 15.34% | 594 | 599 | 603 | 633 | 681 | |
| Alliance | Joan Tomlin | 10.72% | 415 | 461 | 577 | 603 | 634.2 | 638.4 |
| Alliance | Alison Lowry | 8.86% | 343 | 386 | 528 | 555 | 585 | 590.4 |
| UUP | C. W. W. Torrance | 11.05% | 428 | 430 | 443 | | | |
| Alliance | H. Munnis | 7.07% | 274 | 294 | | | | |
| NI Labour | P. V. Cachart | 3.25% | 126 | | | | | |
Electorate: 5,759 Valid: 3,873 (67.25%) Spoilt: 70 Quota: 646 Turnout: 3,943 (68.47%)
