= Alan Carr (politician) =

Northern Irish trade unionist and politician

Alan Carr (born 1948) is a former trade unionist and politician from Northern Ireland.

Carr studied at Annadale Grammar School in Belfast and the New University of Ulster, at which he founded a Labour Club. He joined the Northern Ireland Labour Party (NILP), and was first elected to its executive committee in 1970/71.

Carr became a lecturer and administrator for the Open University, and was the NILP's leading figure from the mid-1970s to the early 1980s, chairing the party for much of the period. While the British and Irish Communist Organisation claimed that he was a member of their group in the early 1970s, he was criticised by them later in the decade. He also led the expulsion of Peter Hadden's Labour and Trade Union Group from the NILP in 1977, and with the Newtownabbey Labour Party, which split away from the NILP following disputes over the Ulster Workers' Strike. Carr strongly opposed Michael Foot's leadership of the British Labour Party, believing Foot was too sympathetic to Irish nationalism.

Carr stood unsuccessfully for the Northern Ireland Constitutional Convention in Londonderry in 1975. He then shifted his attention to Belfast, standing for the City Council's Area H at the 1977 Northern Ireland local elections and 1981, and for Belfast North at the 1979 UK general election, at which he took 4.5% of the vote.

From the mid-1980s, Carr focused on his university career; he served as the Open University's "Head of Union Liaison" in the mid-2000s, and was national treasurer of the University and College Union until his retirement in 2012.

Party political offices
Preceded by Sandy Scott	Chair of the Northern Ireland Labour Party; 1977 – 1981	Succeeded by Bob Clarke
