= Carrickfergus Area B =

District electoral areas in Carrickfergus, Northern Ireland

Carrickfergus Area B was one of the three district electoral areas in Carrickfergus, Northern Ireland which existed from 1973 to 1985. The district elected five members to Carrickfergus Borough Council, and formed part of the North Antrim constituencies for the Northern Ireland Assembly and UK Parliament.

It was created for the 1973 local elections, and contained the wards of Blackhead, Boneybefore, Eden, Victoria and Whitehead. It was abolished for the 1985 local elections and replaced by the Kilroot DEA.

== Councillors ==
Election	Councillor (Party)	Councillor (Party)	Councillor (Party)	Councillor (Party)	Councillor (Party)
1981	William Cross (DUP)	William Knox (DUP)	Hugh McLean (UUP)	James Brown (UUP)	Patrick Conway (Alliance)
1977	Charles Hilditch (Alliance)	Desmond Scott (DUP)	Hugh McLean (UUP)	George Armstrong (UUP)	Patrick Conway (Alliance)
1973	S. Campbell (Independent)	J. Craig (United Loyalist)	Hugh McLean (UUP)	David McCune (UUP)	R. Lorimer (Alliance)

== 1981 Election ==
1977: 2 x UUP, 2 x Alliance, 1 x DUP

1981: 2 x UUP, 2 x DUP, 1 x Alliance

1977-1981 Change: DUP gain from Alliance

Carrickfergus Area B - 5 seats
Party	Candidate	FPv%	Count								
Party	Candidate	FPv%	1	2	3	4	5	6	7	8	9
DUP	William Cross	18.98%	748								
UUP	Hugh McLean*	17.79%	701								
UUP	James Brown	14.92%	588	590.64	606.18	608.24	687.24				
Alliance	Patrick Conway*	11.32%	446	446.84	448.28	469.28	472.18	498.54	501.74	694.74	
DUP	William Knox	9.11%	359	433.52	437.24	438.3	454.88	483.6	495.76	500.94	749.94
Alliance	Charles Hilditch*	7.79%	307	308.2	312.82	340.82	347.6	368.32	374.08	433.06	439.06
DUP	Steven Watters	6.32%	249	256.8	259.2	259.2	265.52	274.82	280.58	285.58	
Alliance	Alice Bateman	5.86%	231	231	231.42	249.42	250.72	277.02	280.22		
UPUP	Robert Wilson	3.10%	122	122.6	124.34	131.4	134.02				
UUP	Henry Cardwell	2.66%	105	106.2	117	123					
Newtownabbey Labour	Richard Hopkins	2.16%	85	85	85.18						
Electorate: 6,627 Valid: 3,941 (59.47%) Spoilt: 133 Quota: 657 Turnout: 4,074 (61.48%)

== 1977 Election ==
1973: 2 x UUP, 1 x Alliance, 1 x United Loyalist, 1 x Independent

1977: 2 x UUP, 2 x Alliance, 1 x DUP

1973-1977 Change: Alliance and DUP gain from United Loyalist and Independent

Carrickfergus Area B - 5 seats
Party	Candidate	FPv%	Count						
Party	Candidate	FPv%	1	2	3	4	5	6	7
Alliance	Charles Hilditch	21.44%	745						
UUP	George Armstrong	19.65%	683						
DUP	Desmond Scott	12.23%	425	425.22	427.92	453.37	617.37		
Alliance	Patrick Conway	7.80%	271	349.1	350.15	367.38	369.75	370.57	617.57
UUP	Hugh McLean*	11.94%	415	425.56	455.41	493.75	514.72	527.43	557.53
UUP	David McCune*	7.02%	244	255.44	308.84	332.18	390.68	411.18	447.27
Alliance	Alice Bateman	7.37%	256	306.38	309.83	341.35	348.09	351.37	
United Loyalist	James Brown	7.28%	253	254.1	260.55	278.77			
Independent	Elizabeth McMaster	5.27%	183	192.02	195.77				
Electorate: 6,389 Valid: 3,475 (54.39%) Spoilt: 91 Quota: 580 Turnout: 3,566 (55.81%)

== 1973 Election ==
1973: 2 x UUP, 1 x Alliance, 1 x United Loyalist, 1 x Independent

Carrickfergus Area B - 5 seats
Party	Candidate	FPv%	Count				
Party	Candidate	FPv%	1	2	3	4	5
United Loyalist	J. Craig	29.81%	1,231				
UUP	David McCune	14.04%	580	853.24			
UUP	Hugh McLean	11.02%	455	581.5	707.5		
Alliance	R. Lorimer	15.33%	633	649.56	650.96	707.96	
Independent	S. Campbell	9.88%	408	495.86	513.22	517.98	731.98
Alliance	E. McGowan	10.15%	419	429.58	433.22	499.18	529.18
Independent	S. Niblock	6.17%	255	275.24	282.8	299.48	
NI Labour	H. McKeown	3.61%	149	155.9	158.98		
Electorate: 6,154 Valid: 4,130 (67.11%) Spoilt: 49 Quota: 689 Turnout: 4,179 (67.91%)
