= Herbert Gallagher =

Northern Irish medical professional and politician

Herbert William Gallagher FRCS (1917–2007) was a Northern Irish medical professional, politician and World War II Royal Army Medical Corps officer.

He attended Methodist College, Belfast and Queen's University Belfast, where he studied medicine, matriculating in 1939. At the onset of World War II he volunteered for the British Army's Medical Corps.

In 1940, he was travelling from Northern Ireland to England when the ship struck a mine outside Liverpool. Using his medical skills he tended to the casualties. His war service took him to Egypt and India. He married a nursing sister from the same unit. After being demobbed he trained as a surgeon at Belfast City Hospital. After the National Health Service was created, he became a Consultant at Banbridge and Newtownards Hospitals.

== Affiliations ==
- Founder, Ulster Surgical Club
- President, Ulster Medical Society
- Fellow, Royal Academy of Medicine (Ireland)
- Fellow, Royal College of Surgeons (Edinburgh)
- Fellow, Royal College of Surgeons (Ireland)

== Retirement/death ==
He retired in 1977, aged 60. He became an Alliance Party councillor and a founding member of Comber Probus Club, which he attended till shortly before his death from throat cancer. He was a widower at the time of his death in 2007.
