= British Ulster Dominion Party =

- Founder: Kennedy Lindsay
- Founded: 1975
- Dissolved: Autumn 1982
- Split from: United Ulster Unionist movement
- Merged into: United Ulster Unionist Party
- Newspaper: The Ulsterman
- Ideology: Ulster nationalism

The British Ulster Dominion Party was a minor political party in Northern Ireland during the 1970s.

The party began in 1975 as the Ulster Dominion Group, when Professor Kennedy Lindsay broke from the United Ulster Unionist movement (which would later emerge as the United Ulster Unionist Party), itself a breakaway from the Vanguard Progressive Unionist Party, to form a new group that would fully support the idea of Dominion status for Northern Ireland. The UDG wanted effective independence for the Province, although the British monarch would continue as Head of state and would be represented by a Governor-General.

The UDG changed its name to the British Ulster Dominion Party in 1977 when it decided to take a more formalised role in Northern Irish politics. The party put up four candidates in Antrim town, Larne Town and Ballyclare in the local elections of that same year but found that it had very little support with none of the candidates being able to achieve even 5% of the vote. Lindsay himself polled poorly in Ballyclare, finishing last with just 4% of the vote. Thereafter it was obvious that it could not mount a serious challenge to mainstream Unionism, despite the relatively high circulation of its tabloid newspaper The Ulsterman. Demoralised by the failure of 1977, the party had a very low profile thereafter. In Autumn 1982, shortly before the Assembly elections of October 1982, the party merged with the United Ulster Unionist Party (most of whose members had been former colleagues of Lindsay in Vanguard.) Lindsay stood unsuccessfully as a UUUP candidate in those elections in South Antrim and the UUUP was disbanded two years later.

== Election results ==
=== Local elections ===
| Election | First-preference votes | FPv% | Seats |
|---|---|---|---|
| 1977 | 644 | 0.1 | 0 / 107 |
