= 1985 Antrim Borough Council election =

Local government election in Northern Ireland

← 1981	15 May 1985	1989 →

All 19 seats to Antrim Borough Council 10 seats needed for a majority
	First party	Second party	Third party
Party	UUP	DUP	SDLP
Seats won	9	5	3
Seat change	▲2	▼1	▲1
	Fourth party	Fifth party	Sixth party
Party	Alliance	Sinn Féin	Irish Independence
Seats won	1	1	0
Seat change	0	▲1	▼1

Elections to Antrim Borough Council were held on 15 May 1985 on the same day as the other Northern Irish local government elections. The election used three district electoral areas to elect a total of 19 councillors.

== Election results ==
Antrim Borough Council Election Result 1985
Party	Seats	Gains	Losses	Net gain/loss	Seats %	Votes %	Votes	+/−
UUP	9	2	0	▲1	47.4	39.7	5,995	▲1.7
DUP	5	1	0	▲1	26.3	28.4	4,270	▼0.3
SDLP	3	1	0	▲1	21.1	17.8	2,691	▲7.1
Alliance	1	0	0	0	5.3	7.6	1,150	▼3.3
Sinn Féin	1	1	0	▲1	0.0	4.5	675	New
Irish Independence	0	0	1	▼1	0.0	1.6	235	▼5.0
Workers' Party	0	0	0	0	0.0	0.4	63	New

Note: "Votes" are the first preference votes.

== Districts summary ==
Results of the Antrim Borough Council election, 1985 by district
Ward	%	Cllrs	%	Cllrs	%	Cllrs	%	Cllrs	%	Cllrs	%	Cllrs	Total Cllrs
Ward	UUP		DUP		SDLP		Alliance		Sinn Féin		Others		Total Cllrs
Antrim North West	31.7	2	21.7	1	25.8	1	2.2	0	13.8	1	4.8	0	5
Antrim South East	44.2	4	34.6	2	12.6	1	8.6	0	0.0	0	0.0	0	7
Antrim Town	42.9	3	26.9	2	16.2	1	12.5	1	0.0	0	1.5	0	7
Total	39.7	9	28.4	5	17.8	3	7.6	1	4.5	1	2.0	0	19

== District results ==
=== Antrim North West ===
1985: 2 x UUP, 1 x SDLP, 1 x DUP, 1 x Sinn Féin

Antrim North West - 5 seats
Party	Candidate	FPv%	Count						
Party	Candidate	FPv%	1	2	3	4	5	6	7
UUP	James Graham*	23.84%	1,164						
DUP	Wilson Clyde*	17.84%	871						
SDLP	Robert Loughran*	16.10%	786	791.4	824.4				
UUP	John Blakeley*	5.31%	259	501.1	533.7	538.32	711.04	712.04	867.04
Sinn Féin	Henry Cushinan	13.83%	675	675.3	675.3	675.48	675.48	783.48	783.48
SDLP	James Laverty	9.73%	475	475	483	483.06	484.06	586.36	587.36
DUP	Samuel Hall	3.83%	187	222.4	226.4	271.76	294.78	295.78	
Irish Independence	John Heffron*	4.81%	235	235.9	242.9	242.96	242.96		
UUP	Roderick Swann	2.52%	123	179.7	202.6	203.68			
Alliance	John Wallace	2.19%	107	113					
Electorate: 7,005 Valid: 4,882 (60.81%) Spoilt: 88 Quota: 814 Turnout: 4,970 (70.95%)

=== Antrim South East ===
1985: 4 x UUP, 2 x DUP, 1 x SDLP

Antrim South East - 7 seats
Party	Candidate	FPv%	Count							
Party	Candidate	FPv%	1	2	3	4	5	6	7	8
DUP	Roy Thompson*	19.95%	1,207							
UUP	Edgar Wallace*	12.69%	768							
SDLP	Robert Burns*	12.56%	760							
DUP	Samuel Dunlop*	11.35%	687	809.84						
UUP	Carol Cunningham	10.41%	630	660.34	665.34	669.5	795.5			
UUP	Howard Campbell	9.07%	549	564.54	566.54	568.62	628.53	649.01	651.72	794.79
UUP	Mervyn Rea	6.21%	376	405.6	407.6	409.68	533.25	545.73	549.31	709.72
Alliance	John McCourt	5.01%	303	309.66	501.66	502.3	508.67	509.63	510.08	517.63
DUP	William McCormick	3.34%	202	422.52	424.89	464.41	501.01	504.85	505.05	
UUP	James Robinson	5.77%	349	366.02	368.02	370.9				
Alliance	Theresa Gallagher	3.64%	220	220.37						
Electorate: 10,286 Valid: 6,051 (58.83%) Spoilt: 114 Quota: 757 Turnout: 6,165 (59.94%)

=== Antrim Town ===
1985: 3 x UUP, 2 x DUP, 1 x SDLP, 1 x Alliance

Antrim Town - 7 seats
Party	Candidate	FPv%	Count							
Party	Candidate	FPv%	1	2	3	4	5	6	7	8
UUP	Jack Allen*	21.03%	872							
SDLP	Oran Keenan	16.16%	670							
UUP	Paddy Marks*	15.48%	642							
Alliance	James McConnell	6.42%	266	273.79	324.79	326.31	352.31	399	405.28	577.28
UUP	Roy Stinson	2.41%	100	289.01	289.01	333.85	337.79	340.98	498.4	516.46
DUP	Margaret Brown	10.44%	433	469.9	470.15	478.89	478.89	480.71	505.24	510.88
DUP	Charles Quinn*	9.72%	403	421.45	421.45	430.95	431.45	432.64	464.38	465.38
DUP	Adam McKee	6.75%	280	295.17	295.67	304.22	305.97	308.97	337.5	346.05
Alliance	Mary Wallace	3.50%	145	149.1	196.1	199.9	251.81	308.82	314.28	
UUP	Andrew Thompson	3.93%	163	239.26	239.76	282.13	283.82	284.82		
Alliance	James Williamson	2.63%	109	111.46	116.96	117.72	121.97			
Workers' Party	Robert Owens	1.52%	63	63.41	108.41	108.79				
Electorate: 9,755 Valid: 4,146 (42.50%) Spoilt: 138 Quota: 519 Turnout: 4,284 (43.92%)
