= Stewart Dunlop =

Irish politician

Member of Antrim Borough Council
- In office 30 May 1973 – 20 May 1981
- Preceded by: Council established
- Succeeded by: Wilson Clyde
- Constituency: Antrim Area A

Member of the Constitutional Convention for South Antrim
- In office 1975–1976

Personal details
- Born: 1946 (age 79–80) Antrim, Northern Ireland
- Party: Independent Unionist (from 1981); Democratic Unionist (1971 - 1981)
- Other political affiliations: Protestant Unionist (1966 - 1971)

Stewart Dunlop (born 1946) was a Democratic Unionist Party (DUP) politician.

== Political career ==
Dunlop was a founder member of the Protestant Unionist Party and subsequently its successor the Democratic Unionist Party (DUP). He was a member of the Northern Ireland Constitutional Convention for South Antrim. He served as a member of Antrim Borough Council, being elected in 1977, 1981, 1985 and 1989.

Northern Ireland Constitutional Convention
New convention	Member for South Antrim; 1975–1976	Convention dissolved
