= Charles Kinahan =

Charles Kinahan (10 July 1915 – 16 August 1995) was a politician in Northern Ireland.

Kinahan studied at Stowe School. He was a founder member of the Alliance Party of Northern Ireland and was a director of Bass Ireland. He stood unsuccessfully for the party in South Antrim at the February and October 1974 UK general elections, but was elected to the Northern Ireland Constitutional Convention from South Antrim.

Kinahan was appointed as a Deputy Lieutenant of County Antrim, the Belfast Harbour Commissioners, and as a member of the Senate of the Queen's University of Belfast. His last political contest was South Antrim at the 1979 UK general election.

In 1980, Kinahan was appointed to the National Heritage Memorial Fund.

Northern Ireland Constitutional Convention
New convention	Member for South Antrim; 1975–1976	Convention dissolved
