= Ken McFaul =

Member of Carrickfergus Borough Council
- In office 30 May 1973 – 15 May 1985
- Preceded by: District created
- Succeeded by: District abolished
- Constituency: Carrickfergus Area C

Member of the Northern Ireland Constitutional Convention for North Antrim
- In office 1975–1976

Personal details
- Born: 1948 (age 77–78) Newtownabbey, Northern Ireland
- Party: Traditional Unionist Voice (since 2007); Democratic Unionist Party (1971 - 1984)
- Other political affiliations: Protestant Unionist Party (until 1971)

Kenneth McFaul (born 1948) is a Northern Irish unionist politician.

== Political career ==
McFaul was a member of the Protestant Unionist Party and a founder of their successor group the Democratic Unionist Party (DUP). He represented the party as a member of the Northern Ireland Constitutional Convention for East Antrim and was a member of Carrickfergus Borough Council from 1973 to 1985, serving as Mayor from 1981 to 1983. He was an unsuccessful candidate in the 1982 Northern Ireland Assembly election. He left the DUP in 1984 after missing out to Jim Allister in the race to be the party's general election candidate for East Antrim the previous year.

McFaul would later return to politics with the Traditional Unionist Voice, and was a candidate for the party in the 2014 election to the newly established Mid and East Antrim District Council. He was not elected to the body.

Northern Ireland Constitutional Convention
New convention	Member for North Antrim; 1975–1976	Convention dissolved
