= 2019 Mid and East Antrim District Council election =

2019 Northern Irish local government election

2019 Mid and East Antrim Council election
← 2014	2 May 2019	2023 →

All 40 council seats 21 seats needed for a majority
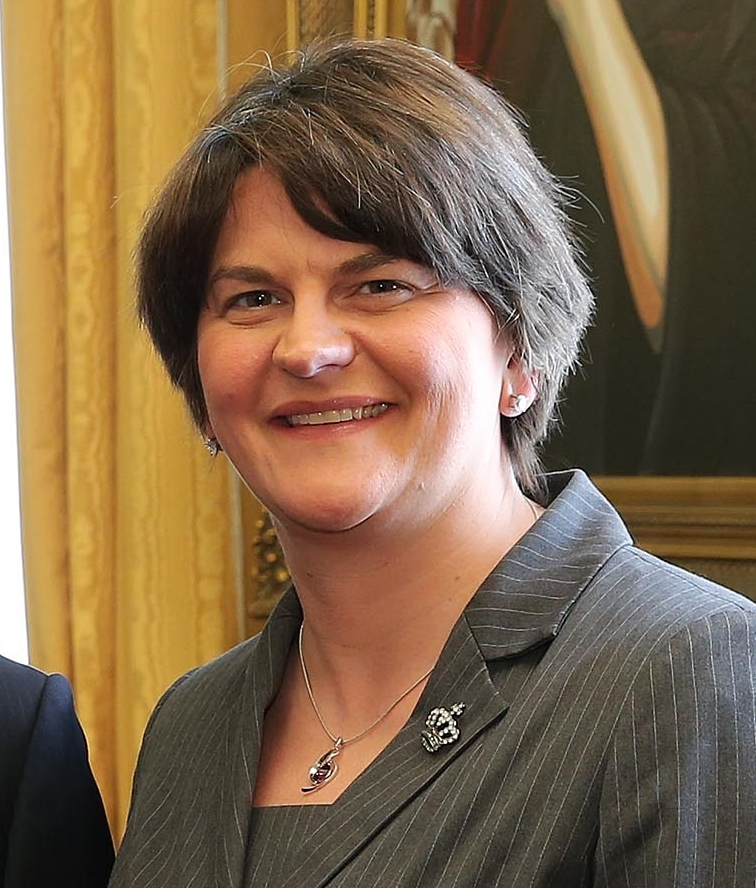

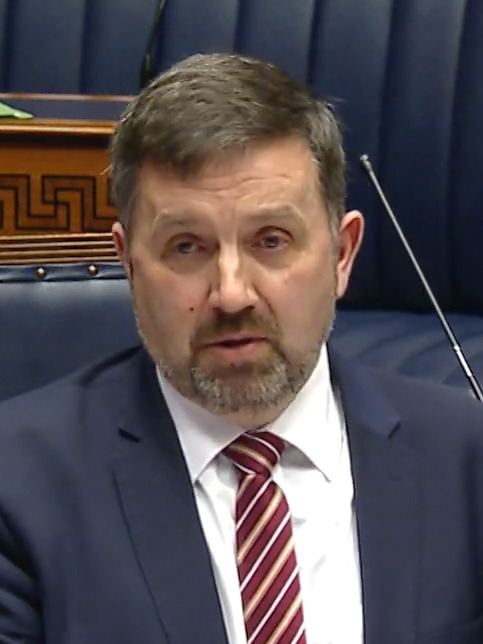

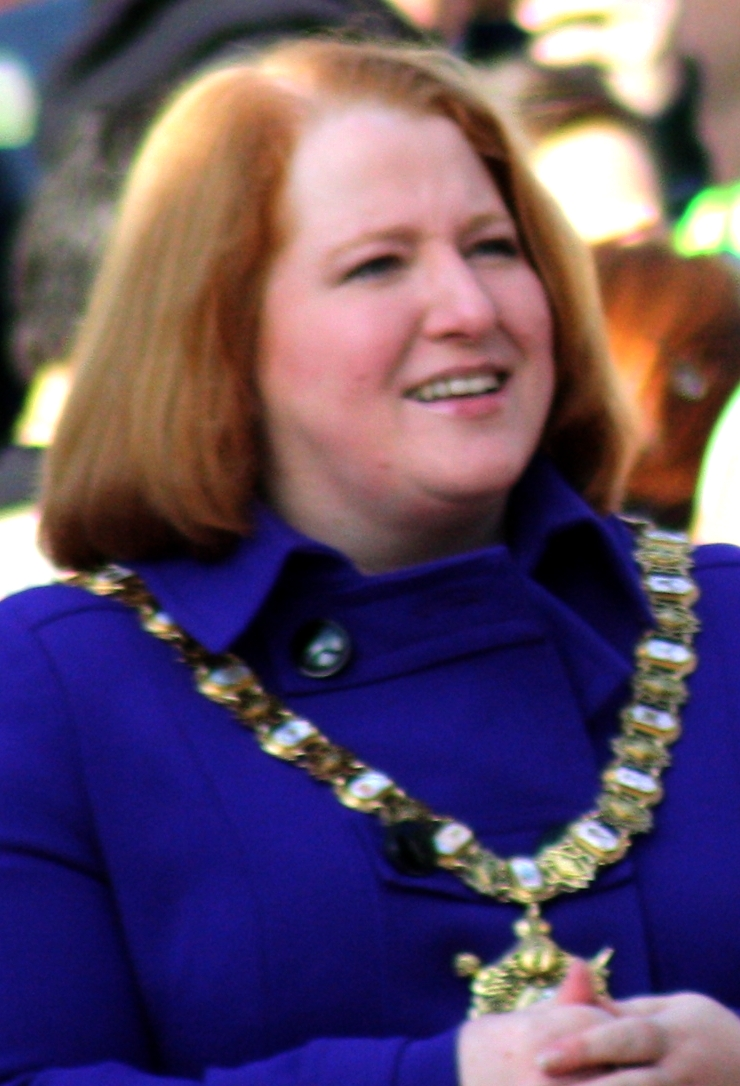

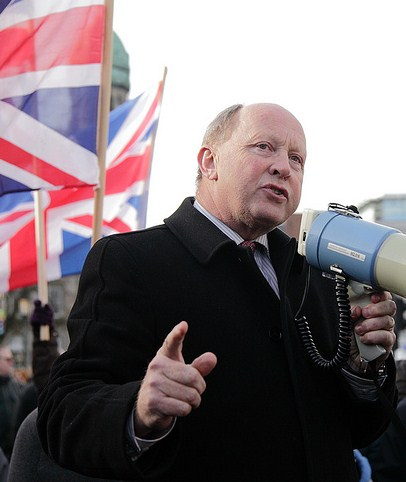

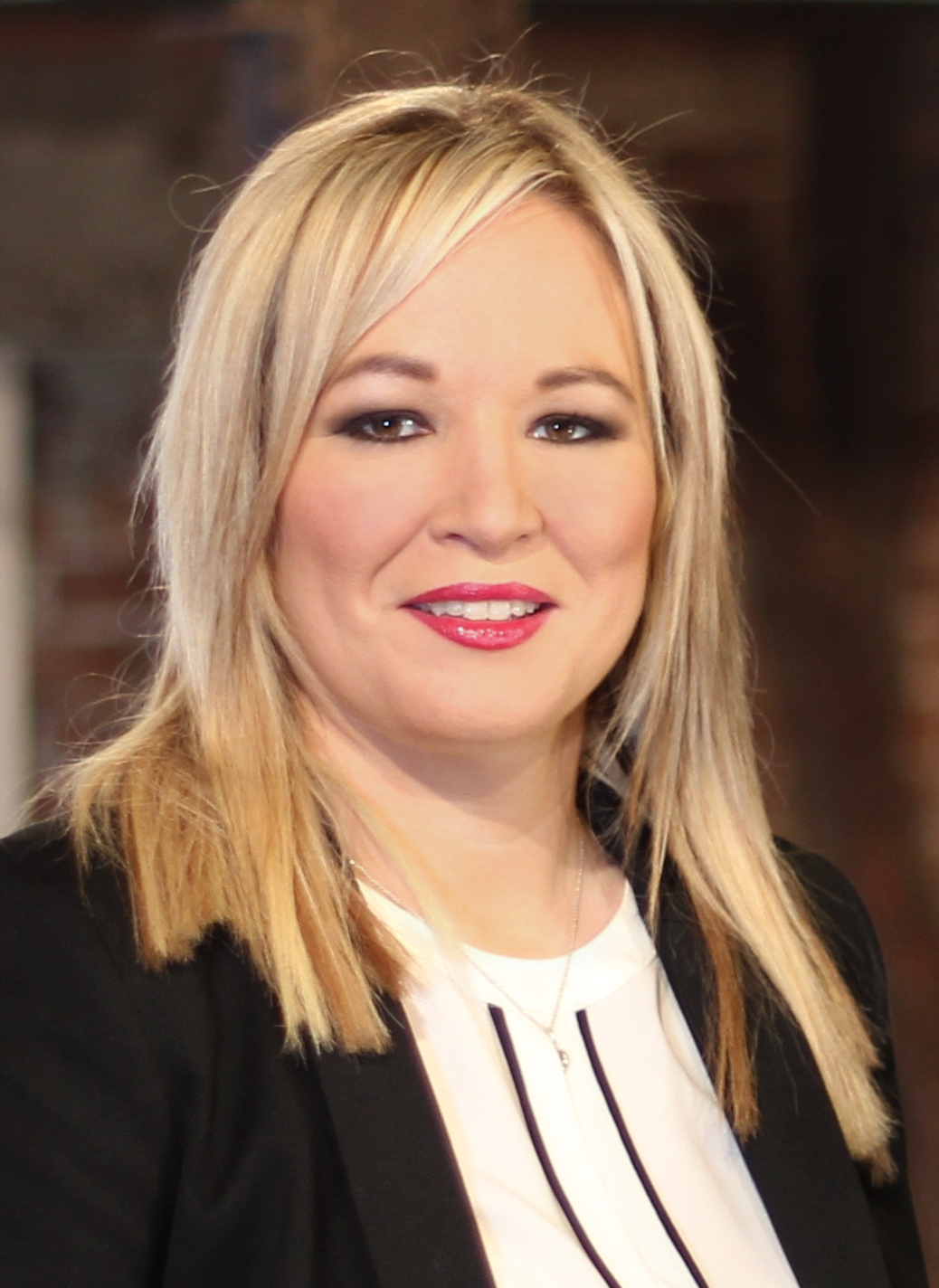

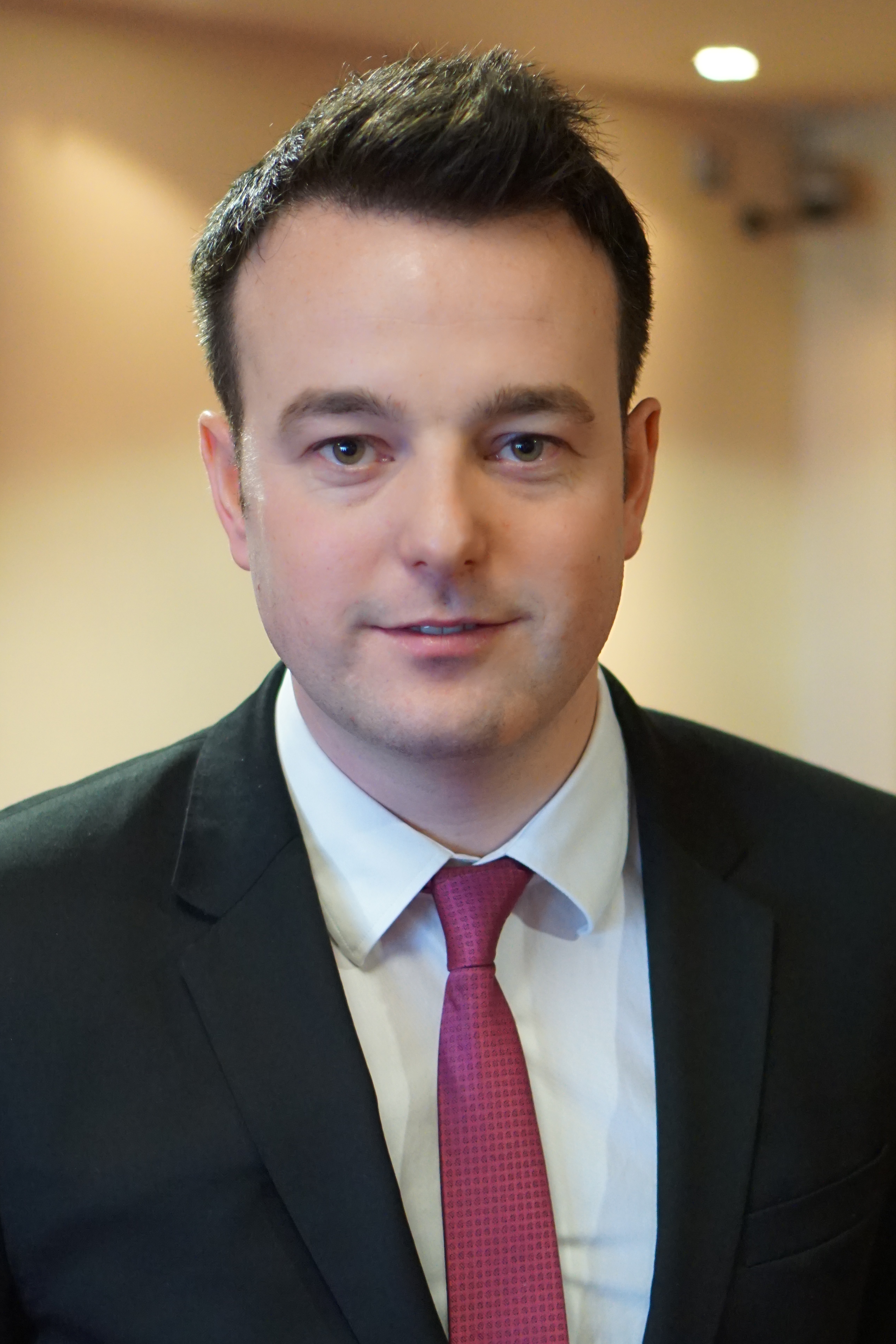

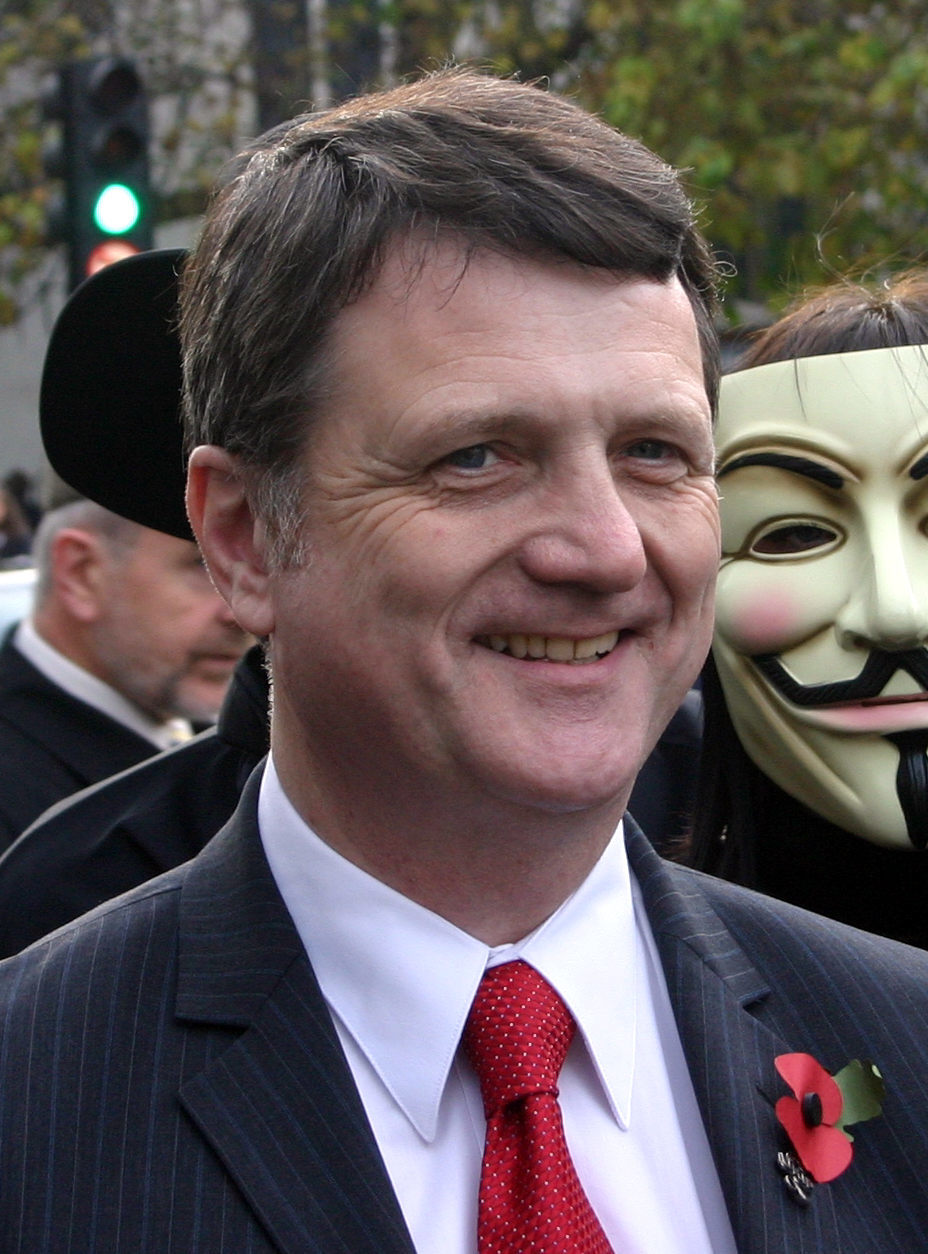
	First party	Second party	Third party
Leader	Arlene Foster	Robin Swann	Naomi Long
Party	DUP	UUP	Alliance
Seats won	15	7	7
Seat change	▼1	▼2	▲4
	Fourth party	Fifth party	Sixth party
Leader	Jim Allister	Michelle O'Neill	Colum Eastwood
Party	TUV	Sinn Féin	SDLP
Seats won	5	2	1
Seat change	0	▼1	0
	Seventh party	Eighth party
Leader		Gerard Batten
Party	Independent	UKIP
Seats won	3	0
Seat change	▲1	▼1
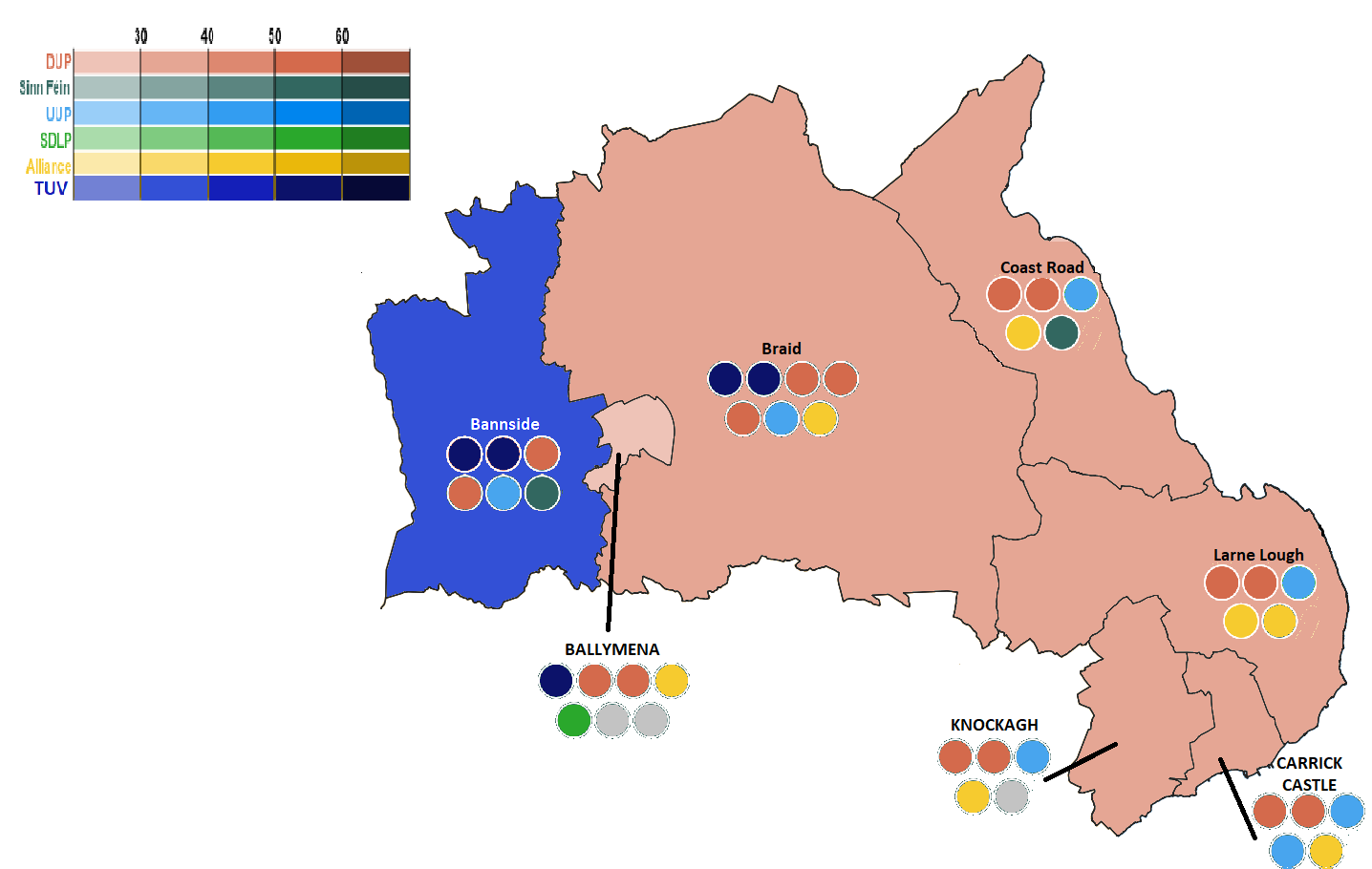
- Mid and East Antrim 2019 Council Election Results by DEA (Shaded by the plurality of FPVs)

Elections to Mid and East Antrim District Council, part of the Northern Ireland local elections on 2 May 2019, returned 40 members to the council using Single Transferable Vote. The Democratic Unionist Party were the largest party in both first-preference votes and seats.

== Election results ==
Mid and East Antrim District Council Election Result 2019
Party	Seats	Gains	Losses	Net gain/loss	Seats %	Votes %	Votes	+/−
DUP	15	0	1	▼1	37.5	32.0	14,976	▼1.0
UUP	7	1	3	▼2	17.5	18.2	8,540	▼0.6
Alliance	7	4	0	▲4	17.5	15.8	7,407	▲6.4
TUV	5	1	1	0	12.5	15.2	7,126	▲0.2
Independent	3	2	1	▲1	7.5	8.2	3,862	▲2.2
Sinn Féin	2	0	1	▼1	5.0	6.4	2,996	▼0.4
SDLP	1	0	0	0	2.5	1.8	848	▼2.3
PUP	0	0	0	0	0.0	0.6	304	▼2.4
Democrats and Veterans	0	0	0	0	0.0	0.6	265	New
Green (NI)	0	0	0	0	0.0	0.5	256	▲0.5
UKIP	0	0	1	▼1	0.0	0.5	247	▼1.1

Note: "Votes" are the first preference votes.

The overall turnout was 47.58% with a total of 46,827 valid votes cast. A total of 556 ballots were rejected.

== Districts summary ==
Results of the Mid and East Antrim District Council election, 2019 by district
Ward	%	Cllrs	%	Cllrs	%	Cllrs	%	Cllrs	%	Cllrs	%	Cllrs	%	Cllrs	Total Cllrs
Ward	DUP		UUP		Alliance		TUV		Sinn Féin		SDLP		Others		Total Cllrs
Ballymena	27.6	2	7.0	0	8.3	1	15.1	1	7.5	0	12.2	1	22.4	2	7
Bannside	27.0	2	15.3	1	9.3	0	36.4	2	12.0	1	0.0	0	0.0	0	6
Braid	37.7	3	21.3	1	8.0	1	20.1	2	7.1	0	0.0	0	5.8	0	7
Carrick Castle	35.8	2	22.3	2	21.4	1	0.0	0	0.0	0	0.0	0	20.5	0	5
Coast Road	30.9	2	13.0	1	21.7	1	10.7	0	15.5	1	0.0	0	8.2	0	5
Knockagh	31.8	2	24.7	1	20.6	1	5.8	0	0.0	0	0.0	0	17.2	1	5
Larne Lough	32.9	2	25.8	1	29.7	2	7.3	0	0.0	0	0.0	0	4.3	0	5
Total	32.0	15	18.2	7	15.8	7	15.2	5	6.4	2	1.8	1	10.4	3	40

== District results ==
=== Ballymena ===
2014: 3 x DUP, 1 x Independent, 1 x SDLP, 1 x TUV, 1 x UUP
2019: 2 x DUP, 2 x Independent, 1 x SDLP, 1 x TUV, 1 x Alliance
2014-2019 Change: Alliance and Independent gain from DUP and UUP

Ballymena - 7 seats
Party	Candidate	FPv%	Count							
Party	Candidate	FPv%	1	2	3	4	5	6	7	8
Independent	James Henry*	12.57%	872							
SDLP	Eugene Reid	12.23%	848	870						
TUV	Matthew Armstrong	11.03%	765	781	1,016					
Alliance	Patricia O'Lynn †	8.33%	578	611	612	614.96	617.96	941.96		
DUP	Audrey Wales*	6.79%	471	496	499	503.44	706.36	707.36	709.3	812.72
Independent	Rodney Quigley	6.24%	433	514	530	571.44	586.44	610.44	669.61	802.38
DUP	John Carson* –	7.60%	527	538	544	558.8	655.28	657.28	657.28	758.47
DUP	Reuben Glover*	7.18%	498	511	529	557.12	632.3	634.3	634.3	706.4
UUP	Stephen Nicholl*	6.99%	485	500	510	548.48	575.48	578.48	589.15	
Sinn Féin	Patrice Hardy	7.51%	521	529	529	529	530			
DUP	William Logan	5.80%	402	410	417	431.06				
TUV	Philip Gordon	4.13%	286	302						
UKIP	Rab Picken	2.06%	143							
Independent	Conal Stewart	1.54%	107							
Electorate: 15,896 Valid: 6,956 (43.76%) Spoilt: 67 Quota: 870 Turnout: 7,023 (44.18%)

=== Bannside ===
2014: 2 x TUV, 2 x DUP, 1 x UUP, 1 x Sinn Féin
2019: 2 x TUV, 2 x DUP, 1 x UUP, 1 x Sinn Féin
2014-2019 Change: No change

Bannside - 6 seats
Party	Candidate	FPv%	Count							
Party	Candidate	FPv%	1	2	3	4	5	6	7	8
TUV	Stewart McDonald*	18.63%	1,504							
TUV	Timothy Gaston*	17.75%	1,433							
UUP	William McNeilly*	9.70%	783	855.54	916.48	1,285.48				
DUP	Thomas Gordon	9.21%	744	796.52	863.84	895.3	923.14	1,339.14		
DUP	Tommy Nicholl*	8.55%	690	812.72	856.72	901.14	940.5	1,242.5		
Sinn Féin	Ian Friary	12.03%	971	971.52	972.18	972.18	972.18	972.4	972.4	972.4
Alliance	Philip Burnside	9.29%	750	763	773.34	809.52	860.4	883.34	927.34	971.34
DUP	Andrew Wright	9.28%	749	773.7	828.92	843.44	854.44			
UUP	Jackson Minford	5.56%	449	503.08	537.4					
Electorate: 14,393 Valid: 8,073 (56.09%) Spoilt: 96 Quota: 1,154 Turnout: 8,169 (56.76%)

=== Braid ===
2014: 4 x DUP, 1 x TUV, 1 x UUP, 1 x Sinn Féin
2019: 3 x DUP, 2 x TUV, 1 x UUP, 1 x Alliance
2014-2019 Change: TUV and Alliance gain from DUP and Sinn Féin

Braid - 7 seats
Party	Candidate	FPv%	Count						
Party	Candidate	FPv%	1	2	3	4	5	6	7
UUP	Robin Cherry*	12.26%	1,084	1,107					
DUP	Beth Adger*	11.03%	975	982	1,284				
Alliance	Muriel Burnside †	7.95%	703	896	896	896	896.08	1,296.08	
DUP	Julie Frew	10.48%	926	933	1,077	1,103.55	1,103.59	1,106.59	
DUP	William McCaughey*	9.33%	825	827	907	1,050.96	1,051.04	1,054.04	1,058.04
TUV	Christopher Jamieson	10.20%	902	909	964	966.36	966.36	972.36	983.36
TUV	Brian Collins*	9.86%	872	881	894	896.36	896.52	898.52	905.52
UUP	Keith Turner	9.05%	800	816	827	827.59	828.03	848.03	898.03
Sinn Féin	Colette McAllister	7.14%	631	827	827	827	827.04		
DUP	Sam Hanna	6.85%	605	606					
Independent	Marian Maguire	4.20%	371						
Independent	Roni Browne	1.65%	146						
Electorate: 16,951 Valid: 8,840 (52.15%) Spoilt: 96 Quota: 1,106 Turnout: 8,936 (52.72%)

=== Carrick Castle ===
2014: 2 x DUP, 1 x UUP, 1 x UKIP, 1 x Independent
2019: 2 x DUP, 2 x UUP, 1 x Alliance
2014-2019 Change: UUP and Alliance gain from Independent and UKIP

Carrick Castle - 5 seats
Party	Candidate	FPv%	Count						
Party	Candidate	FPv%	1	2	3	4	5	6	7
Alliance	Lauren Gray	21.40%	1,210						
DUP	Billy Ashe*	18.91%	1,069						
DUP	Cheryl Johnston*	16.86%	953						
UUP	Robin Stewart*	14.38%	813	879	906.3	928.89	979.89		
UUP	John McDermott ‡	7.87%	445	513.4	565.66	620.1	659.53	780.15	811.83
Independent	Noel Jordan*	7.62%	431	481.1	490.72	545.03	641.47	778.2	783.15
Democrats and Veterans	Si Harvey	4.69%	265	289.3	301.26	353.08	383.37		
Independent	Nicholas Wady	4.32%	244	286.3	290.2	311.79			
PUP	Jim McCaw	2.11%	119	127.4	135.46				
UKIP	John Kennedy	1.84%	104	111.2	123.68				
Electorate: 13,323 Valid: 5,653 (42.43%) Spoilt: 68 Quota: 943 Turnout: 5,721 (42.94%)

=== Coast Road ===
2014: 1 x UUP, 1 x Sinn Féin, 1 x Alliance, 1 x DUP, 1 x TUV
2019: 2 x DUP, 1 x Alliance, 1 x Sinn Féin, 1 x UUP
2014-2019 Change: DUP gain from TUV

Coast Road - 5 seats
Party	Candidate	FPv%	Count				
Party	Candidate	FPv%	1	2	3	4	5
Alliance	Geraldine Mulvenna*	21.67%	1,217				
DUP	Andrew Clarke	17.33%	973				
Sinn Féin	James McKeown*	15.55%	873	922.14	922.2	1,109.2	
UUP	Maureen Morrow*	12.96%	728	795.08	798.74	937.76	
DUP	Angela Smyth*	13.60%	764	771.28	794.32	817.46	828.46
TUV	Ruth Wilson*	10.70%	601	611.14	612.94	665.95	681.95
Independent	Martin Wilson	8.19%	460	597.02	597.29		
Electorate: 12,429 Valid: 5,616 (45.18%) Spoilt: 70 Quota: 937 Turnout: 5,686 (45.75%)

=== Knockagh ===
2014: 2 x DUP, 2 x UUP, 1 x Alliance
2019: 2 x DUP, 1 x UUP, 1 x Alliance, 1 x Independent
2014-2019 Change: Independent gain from UUP

Knockagh - 5 seats
Party	Candidate	FPv%	Count			
Party	Candidate	FPv%	1	2	3	4
Alliance	Noel Williams	20.57%	1,173			
DUP	Peter Johnston	16.96%	967			
DUP	Marc Collins –	14.84%	846	854.16	1,016.16	
Independent	Bobby Hadden	13.99%	798	887.76	980.76	
UUP	Andrew Wilson*	13.71%	782	833.12	903	919.82
UUP	Lindsay Millar*	10.94%	624	675.84	825.92	873.48
TUV	May Beattie*	5.75%	328	336.88		
PUP	David Barnett	3.24%	185	190.28		
Electorate: 12,289 Valid: 5,703 (46.41%) Spoilt: 59 Quota: 951 Turnout: 5,762 (46.89%)

=== Larne Lough ===
2014: 2 x DUP, 2 x UUP, 1 x Alliance
2019: 2 x DUP, 2 x Alliance, 1 x UUP
2014-2019 Change: Alliance gain from UUP

Larne Lough - 5 seats
Party	Candidate	FPv%	Count					
Party	Candidate	FPv%	1	2	3	4	5	6
DUP	Gregg McKeen*	19.48%	1,166					
Alliance	Danny Donnelly †	17.66%	1,057					
UUP	Mark McKinty* †	16.42%	983	995.88	1,025.88			
DUP	Paul Reid*	13.46%	806	939.98	950.12	1,133.12		
Alliance	Robert Logan*	12.01%	719	720.82	890.82	909.1	912.1	961.75
UUP	Andrew Wilson*	9.42%	564	570.3	581.58	782.9	914.9	916.2
TUV	James Strange	7.27%	435	441.72	453.86			
Green (NI)	Robert Robinson	4.28%	256	256.56				
Electorate: 13,129 Valid: 5,986 (45.59%) Spoilt: 100 Quota: 998 Turnout: 6,086 (46.36%)

== Changes during the term ==
=== † Co-options ===
Date co-opted	Electoral Area	Party	Outgoing	Co-optee	Reason
16 August 2019	Larne Lough	UUP	Mark McKinty	Keith Turner	McKinty resigned.
17 October 2020	Braid	Alliance	Muriel Burnside	David Reid	Burnside resigned.
26 May 2022	Ballymena	Alliance	Patricia O'Lynn	John Hyland	O'Lynn was elected to the Northern Ireland Assembly.
26 May 2022	Larne Lough	Alliance	Danny Donnelly	Maeve Donnelly	Donnelly was elected to the Northern Ireland Assembly.

=== ‡ Changes in affiliation ===
Date	Electoral Area	Name	Previous affiliation	New affiliation	Circumstance
29 October 2020	Carrick Castle	John McDermott	UUP	DUP	Defected from the UUP to the DUP.

=== – Suspensions ===
Marc Collins (DUP) was suspended from the council for eight months from Friday 24 June 2022.

John Carson (DUP) was suspended from the council for three months from Monday 10 October 2022.

Last updated 12 October 2022.

Current composition: see Mid and East Antrim District Council
