= Ballymena (District Electoral Area) =

District electoral area in Northern Ireland

- Mid and East Antrim Borough Council DEA constituency

Current constituency
- Created: 2014
- Seats: 7 (2014-)
- Councillors: Matthew Armstrong (TUV); Jack Gibson (APNI); Reuben Glover (DUP); Bréanainn Lyness (SF); Lawrie Philpott (IND); Rodney Quigley (IND); Brian Thompson (UUP)

Ballymena DEA within Mid and East Antrim

Ballymena is one of the seven district electoral areas (DEA) in Mid and East Antrim, Northern Ireland. The district elects seven members to Mid and East Antrim District Council and contains the wards of Academy, Ardeevin, Ballykeel, Braidwater, Castle Demesne, Fair Green and Park. Ballymena forms part of the North Antrim constituencies for the Northern Ireland Assembly and UK Parliament.

It was created 2014 local elections, replacing the Ballymena North DEA and Ballymena South DEA which had existed since 1993.

== Councillors ==
Election	Councillor (Party)	Councillor (Party)	Councillor (Party)	Councillor (Party)	Councillor (Party)	Councillor (Party)	Councillor (Party)
August 2025 Defection	Bréanainn Lyness (Sinn Féin)	Jack Gibson (Alliance)	Rodney Quigley (Independent)	Brian Thompson (UUP)	Matthew Armstrong (TUV)	Reuben Glover (DUP)	Lawrie Philpott (DUP)/ (Independent)
August 2024 Co-Option	Bréanainn Lyness (Sinn Féin)	Jack Gibson (Alliance)	Rodney Quigley (Independent)	Brian Thompson (UUP)	Matthew Armstrong (TUV)	Reuben Glover (DUP)	Lawrie Philpott (DUP)/ (Independent)
September 2023 Co-Option	Bréanainn Lyness (Sinn Féin)	Jack Gibson (Alliance)	Rodney Quigley (Independent)	Colin Crawford (UUP)	Matthew Armstrong (TUV)	Reuben Glover (DUP)	Lawrie Philpott (DUP)/ (Independent)
2023	Bréanainn Lyness (Sinn Féin)	John Hyland (Alliance)	Rodney Quigley (Independent)	Colin Crawford (UUP)	Matthew Armstrong (TUV)	Reuben Glover (DUP)	Lawrie Philpott (DUP)/ (Independent)
May 2022 Co-Option	Eugene Reid (SDLP)	John Hyland (Alliance)	Rodney Quigley (Independent)	James Henry (Independent)	Matthew Armstrong (TUV)	Audrey Wales (DUP)	John Carson (DUP)
2019	Eugene Reid (SDLP)	Patricia O'Lynn (Alliance)	Rodney Quigley (Independent)	James Henry (Independent)	Matthew Armstrong (TUV)	Audrey Wales (DUP)	John Carson (DUP)
August 2018 Defection	Declan O'Loan (SDLP)	Reuben Glover (DUP)	Stephen Nicholl (UUP)	James Henry (Independent)	Donna Anderson (TUV)/ (UKIP)/ (Independent)	Audrey Wales (DUP)	John Carson (DUP)
September 2015 Defection	Declan O'Loan (SDLP)	Reuben Glover (DUP)	Stephen Nicholl (UUP)	James Henry (Independent)	Donna Anderson (TUV)/ (UKIP)/ (Independent)	Audrey Wales (DUP)	John Carson (DUP)
2014	Declan O'Loan (SDLP)	Reuben Glover (DUP)	Stephen Nicholl (UUP)	James Henry (Independent)	Donna Anderson (TUV)/ (UKIP)/ (Independent)	Audrey Wales (DUP)	John Carson (DUP)

== 2023 Election ==
2019: 2 x DUP, 2 x Independent, 1 x TUV, 1 x SDLP, 1 x Alliance

2023: 2 x DUP, 1 x TUV, 1 x UUP, 1 x Alliance, 1 x Independent

2019–2023 Change: Sinn Féin and UUP gain from SDLP and Independent

Ballymena - 7 seats
Party	Candidate	FPv%	Count			
Party	Candidate	FPv%	1	2	3	4
Independent	Rodney Quigley*	14.02%	1,023			
TUV	Matthew Armstrong*	13.58%	991			
UUP	Colin Crawford †	13.28%	969			
Sinn Féin	Bréanainn Lyness	12.69%	926			
DUP	Reuben Glover	12.51%	913			
Alliance	John Hyland* †	12.29%	897	913.80		
DUP	Lawrie Philpott ‡	6.33%	462	514.64	831.80	906.90
SDLP	Eugene Reid*	11.03%	805	816.62	820.04	822.84
DUP	Andrew Wright	4.25%	310	337.58		
Electorate: 16,173 Valid: 7,296 (45.11%) Spoilt: 40 Quota: 913 Turnout: 7,336 (45.55%)

== 2019 Election ==
2014: 3 x DUP, 1 x Independent, 1 x SDLP, 1 x TUV, 1 x UUP

2019: 2 x DUP, 2 x Independent, 1 x SDLP, 1 x TUV, 1 x Alliance

2014-2019 Change: Alliance and Independent gain from DUP and UUP

Ballymena - 7 seats
Party	Candidate	FPv%	Count							
Party	Candidate	FPv%	1	2	3	4	5	6	7	8
Independent	James Henry*	12.57%	872							
SDLP	Eugene Reid	12.23%	848	870						
TUV	Matthew Armstrong	11.03%	765	781	1,016					
Alliance	Patricia O'Lynn †	8.33%	578	611	612	614.96	617.96	941.96		
DUP	Audrey Wales*	6.79%	491	496	499	503.44	706.36	707.36	709.3	812.72
Independent	Rodney Quigley	6.24%	433	514	530	571.44	586.44	610.44	669.61	802.38
DUP	John Carson* –	7.60%	527	538	544	558.8	655.28	657.28	657.28	758.47
DUP	Reuben Glover*	7.18%	498	511	529	557.12	632.3	634.3	634.3	706.4
UUP	Stephen Nicholl*	6.99%	485	500	510	548.48	575.48	578.48	589.15	
Sinn Féin	Patrice Hardy	7.51%	521	529	529	529	530			
DUP	William Logan	5.80%	402	410	417	431.06				
TUV	Philip Gordon	4.13%	286	302						
UKIP	Rab Picken	2.06%	143							
Independent	Conal Stewart	1.54%	107							
Electorate: 15,896 Valid: 6,956 (43.76%) Spoilt: 67 Quota: 870 Turnout: 7,023 (44.18%)

== 2014 Election ==
2014: 3 x DUP, 1 x TUV, 1 x SDLP, 1 x UUP, 1 x Independent

Ballymena - 7 seats
Party	Candidate	FPv%	Count										
Party	Candidate	FPv%	1	2	3	4	5	6	7	8	9	10	11
Independent	James Henry*	15.85%	1,042										
SDLP	Declan O'Loan*	9.66%	635	649.08	655.52	672.06	906.06						
DUP	Audrey Wales*	9.10%	598	632.76	657.84	682.6	684.6	685.05	883.05				
TUV	Donna Anderson ‡	11.22%	738	754.72	798.14	804.14	804.14	804.14	813.24	813.86	1,117.86		
DUP	John Carson*	8.85%	582	598.5	625.48	633.14	633.14	633.59	683.89	730.39	761.35	859.35	
UUP	Stephen Nicholl	5.79%	381	418.18	434.94	477.02	480.46	480.91	497.33	497.95	534.67	616.67	728.92
DUP	Reuben Glover	6.49%	427	439.76	461.52	470.4	470.4	470.85	531.81	543.59	564.79	627.79	647.45
Sinn Féin	Marian Maguire	7.25%	477	479.42	479.42	484.42	516.3	548.25	548.25	548.25	548.25	548.25	605.45
Alliance	Jayne Dunlop*	4.71%	310	328.48	333.9	410.18	422.72	471.77	473.21	473.21	478.43	482.43	
TUV	Matthew Armstrong	5.73%	377	388.89	400.2	404.86	404.86	404.86	412.74	413.05			
DUP	David McCartney	5.05%	332	346.08	355.74	362.18	362.18	362.18					
SDLP	Eugene Reid	4.40%	289	292.52	293.52	296.52							
NI21	Richard Marshall	3.21%	211	225.74	236.28								
Independent	Rodney Quigley	2.68%	176	197.34									
Electorate: 15,691 Valid: 6,575 (41.90%) Spoilt: 94 Quota: 822 Turnout: 6,669 (42.50%)
