= 2023 Mid and East Antrim District Council election =

2023 Northern Irish local election

- 18 May 2023

All 40 council seats 21 seats needed for a majority
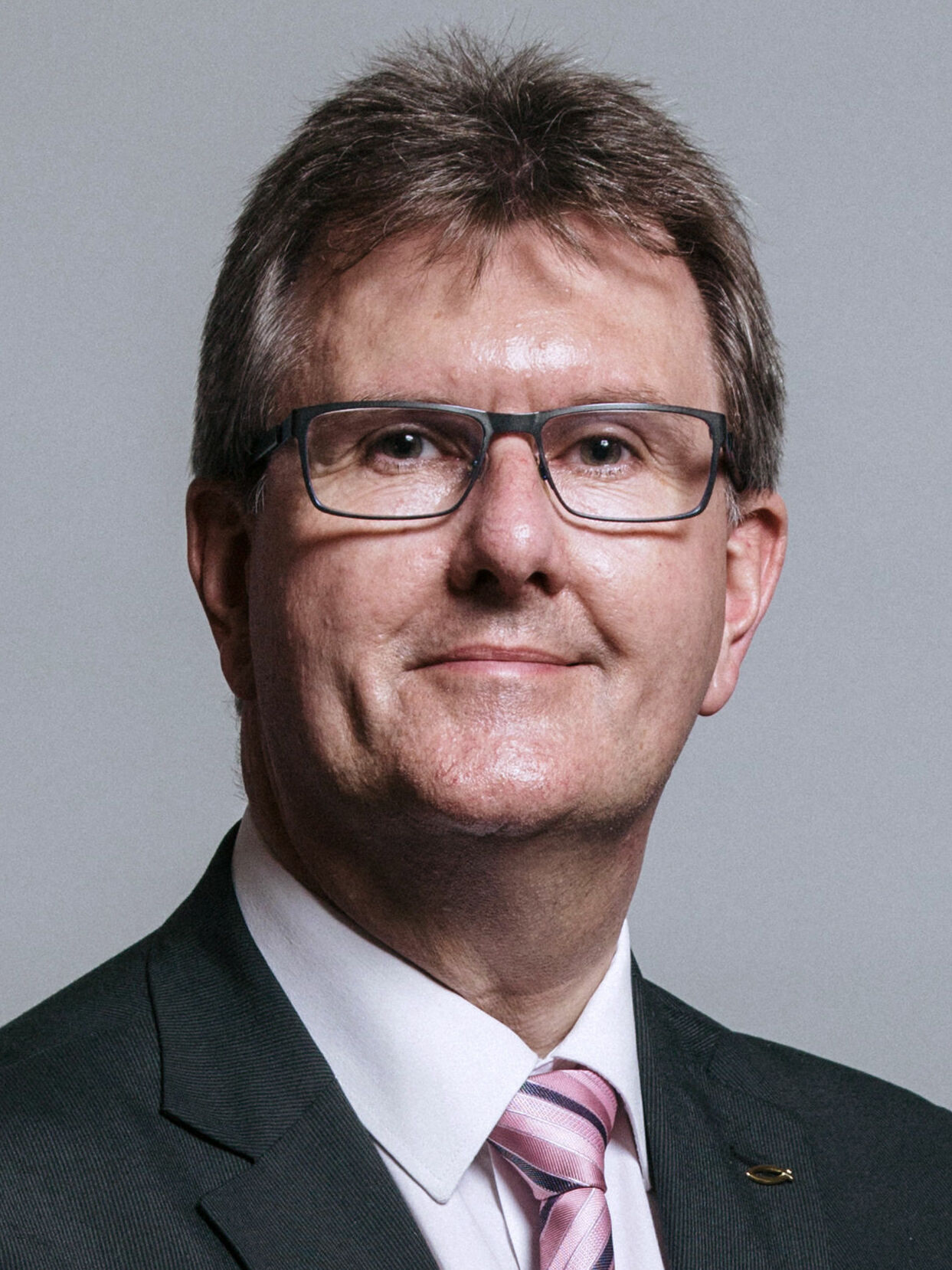

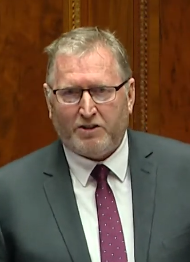

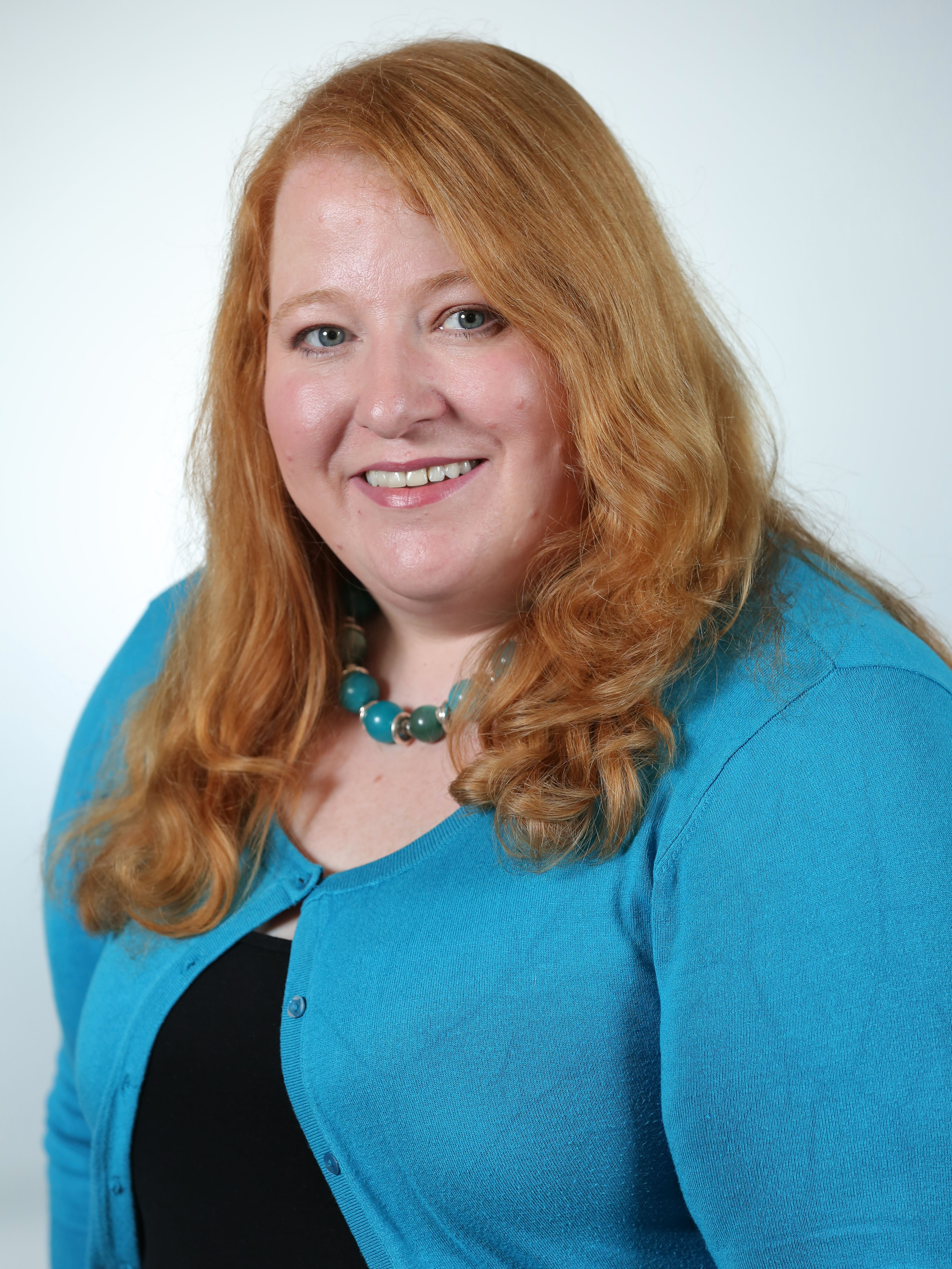

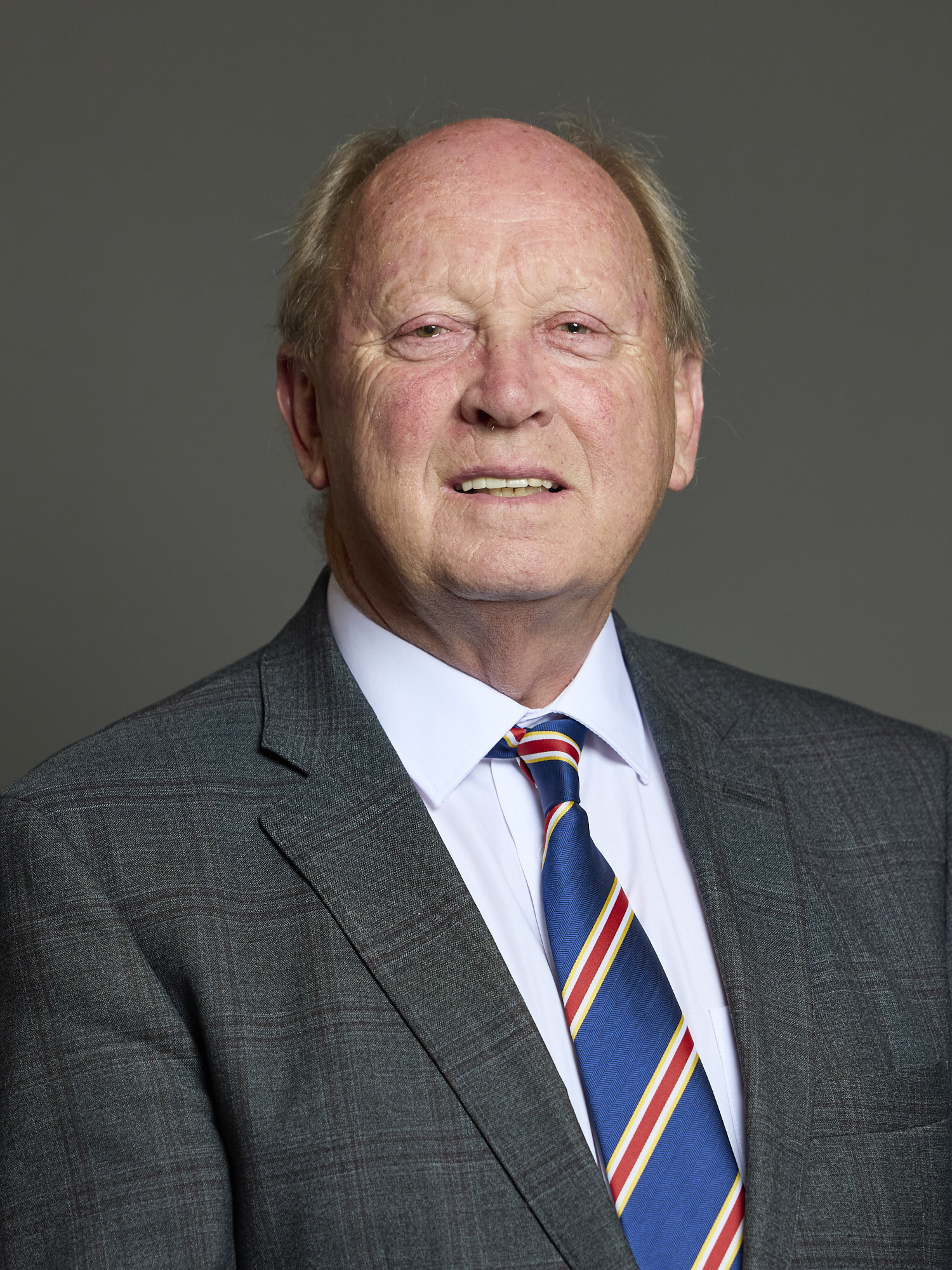

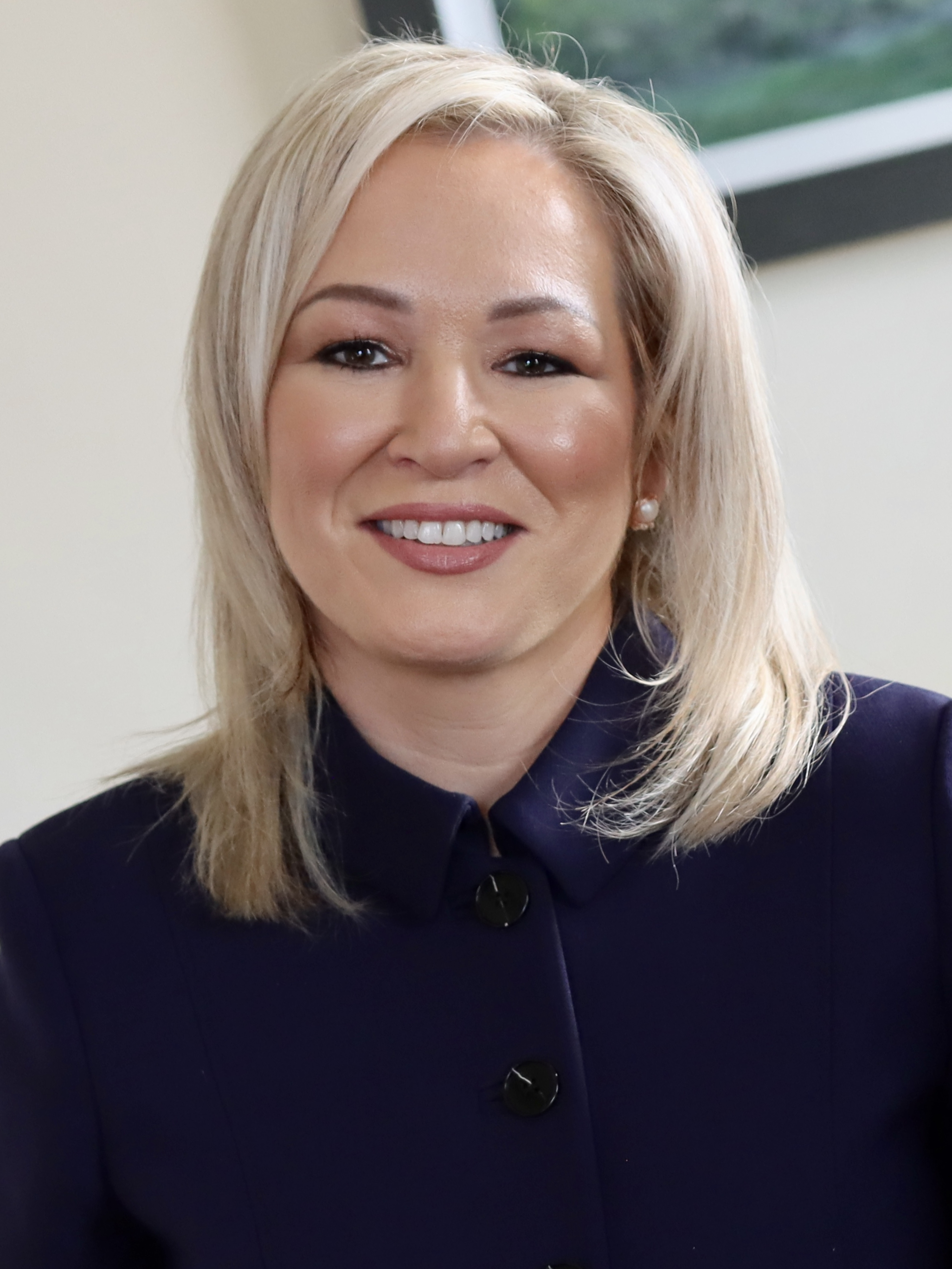
	First party	Second party	Third party
Leader	Jeffrey Donaldson	Doug Beattie	Naomi Long
Party	DUP	UUP	Alliance
Last election	15	7	7
Seats won	14	8	7
Seat change	▼1	▲1	0
Popular vote	15,627	8,764	9,571
Percentage	30.9%	17.3%	18.9%
Swing	▼1.1%	▼0.9%	▲3.1%
	Fourth party	Fifth party	Sixth party
Leader	Jim Allister	Michelle O'Neill (Note: The leader of Sinn Féin is Mary Lou McDonald, who sits as a TD in the Irish Dáil Éireann for Dublin Central. O'Neill is the leader of the party in Northern Ireland.)
Party	TUV	Sinn Féin	Independent
Last election	5	2	3
Seats won	5	4	2
Seat change	0	▲2	▼1
Popular vote	8,050	4,700	2,205
Percentage	15.9%	9.3%	4.4%
Swing	▲0.7%	▲2.9%	▼3.8%
Council control before election
No overall control
Council control after election
Democratic Unionist Party

The 2023 election to Mid and East Antrim District Council was held on 18 May 2023, alongside other local elections in Northern Ireland, two weeks after local elections in England. The Northern Ireland elections were delayed by 2 weeks to avoid overlapping with the coronation of King Charles III.

They returned 40 members to the council via Single Transferable Vote.

== Controversies ==
Tyler Hoey was selected as a DUP candidate to contest the 2023 Mid and East Antrim Council elections. In 2020, Hoey 'liked' a social media post commemorating the Greysteel massacre, which stated, "On this day 27 years ago, An Ulster Freedom Fighters Active Service Unit from North Antrim-Londonderry Brigade 'Trick or Treated' its way into the republican Rising Sun bar in Greysteel in order to gain revenge for the Shankill Bombing. Spirit of '93". Following this revelation, DUP leader Jeffrey Donaldson said that Hoey "deeply regrets some of the things that he said in the past" and that he is "entitled to a second chance."

== Election results ==
Mid and East Antrim District Council Election Result 2023
Party	Seats	Gains	Losses	Net gain/loss	Seats %	Votes %	Votes	+/−
DUP	14	0	1	▼1	32.50	30.90	15,627	▼1.08
UUP	8	1	0	▲1	20.00	17.33	8,764	▼0.91
Alliance	7	0	0	0	17.50	18.93	9,571	▲3.11
TUV	5	0	0	0	12.50	15.92	8,050	▲0.70
Sinn Féin	4	2	0	▲2	10.00	9.29	4,700	▲2.89
Independent	2	0	1	▼1	5.00	4.36	2,205	▼3.89
SDLP	0	0	1	▼1	0.00	2.01	1,016	▲0.20
Green (NI)	0	0	0	0	0.00	0.92	464	▲0.37
PUP	0	0	0	0	0.00	0.32	164	▼0.33
Total	40						50,571	

Note: "Votes" are the first preference votes.

== Districts summary ==
Results of the 2023 Mid and East Antrim District Council election by district
District Electoral Area (DEA)	%	Cllrs	%	Cllrs	%	Cllrs	%	Cllrs	%	Cllrs	%	Cllrs	%	Cllrs	Total cllrs
District Electoral Area (DEA)	DUP		UUP		Alliance		TUV		Sinn Féin		SDLP		Independents and others		Total cllrs
Ballymena	23.09	2	13.28	1 ▲1	12.29	1	13.58	1	12.69	1 ▲1	11.03	0 ▼1	14.04	1 ▼1	7
Bannside	23.85	2	10.74	1	8.75	0	39.54	2	14.72	1	2.40	0	0.0	0	6
Braid	35.31	2 ▼1	18.68	1	10.74	1	21.51	2	13.76	1 ▲1	0.0	0	0.0	0	7
Carrick Castle	39.22	2	23.30	2	25.70	1	6.99	0	0.0	0	0.0	0	4.79	0	5
Coast Road	32.65	2	13.3	1	26.23	1	5.79	0	20.08	1	0.0	0	1.95	0	5
Knockagh	31.99	2	19.04	1	25.53	1	5.37	0	0.0	0	0.0	0	18.07	1	5
Larne Lough	32.15	2	25.27	1	32.56	2	6.67	0	0.0	0	0.0	0	3.35	0	5
Total	30.90	14 ▼1	17.33	8 ▲1	18.93	7	15.92	5	9.29	4 ▲2	2.01	0 ▼1	5.60	2 ▼1	40

== District results ==
=== Ballymena ===
2019: 2 x DUP, 2 x Independent, 1 x TUV, 1 x SDLP, 1 x Alliance

2023: 2 x DUP, 1 x TUV, 1 x UUP, 1 x Alliance, 1 x Independent

2019–2023 Change: Sinn Féin and UUP gain from SDLP and Independent

Ballymena - 7 seats
Party	Candidate	FPv%	Count			
Party	Candidate	FPv%	1	2	3	4
Independent	Rodney Quigley*	14.02%	1,023			
TUV	Matthew Armstrong*	13.58%	991			
UUP	Colin Crawford †	13.28%	969			
Sinn Féin	Bréanainn Lyness	12.69%	926			
DUP	Reuben Glover	12.51%	913			
Alliance	John Hyland* †	12.29%	897	913.80		
DUP	Lawrie Philpott ‡	6.33%	462	514.64	831.80	906.90
SDLP	Eugene Reid*	11.03%	805	816.62	820.04	822.84
DUP	Andrew Wright	4.25%	310	337.58		
Electorate: 16,173 Valid: 7,296 (45.11%) Spoilt: 40 Quota: 913 Turnout: 7,336 (45.55%)

=== Bannside ===
2019: 2 x TUV, 2 x DUP, 1 x UUP, 1 x Sinn Féin

2023: 2 x TUV, 2 x DUP, 1 x Sinn Féin, 1 x UUP

2019–2023 Change: No change

Bannside - 6 seats
Party	Candidate	FPv%	Count					
Party	Candidate	FPv%	1	2	3	4	5	6
TUV	Timothy Gaston* †	16.72%	1,468					
TUV	Stewart McDonald*	16.42%	1,442					
Sinn Féin	Ian Friary*	14.72%	1,292					
DUP	Thomas Gordon*	14.31%	1,256					
DUP	Tyler Hoey	9.54%	838	865.45	867.45	892.28	892.43	1,295.83
UUP	Jackson Minford	10.74%	943	957.1	965.1	983.69	984.14	1,238.67
Alliance	Jack Gibson	8.75%	768	773.25	961.25	965.02	994.63	1,015.02
TUV	Anna Henry	6.40%	562	727.75	728.9	862.54	862.75	
SDLP	Morgan Murphy	2.40%	211	211.15				
Electorate: 15,197 Valid: 8,780 (57.77%) Spoilt: 82 Quota: 1,255 Turnout: 8,862 (58.31%)

=== Braid ===
2019: 3 x DUP, 2 x TUV, 1 x UUP, 1 x Alliance

2023: 2 x DUP, 2 x TUV, 1 x UUP, 1 x Sinn Féin, 1 x Alliance

2019–2023 Change: Sinn Féin gain from DUP

Braid - 7 seats
Party	Candidate	FPv%	Count							
Party	Candidate	FPv%	1	2	3	4	5	6	7	8
Sinn Féin	Archie Rae	13.76%	1,302							
DUP	Beth Adger* †	13.17%	1,246							
DUP	William McCaughey*	12.93%	1,224							
TUV	Christopher Jamieson*	12.63%	1,195							
UUP	Alan Barr	11.18%	1,058	1,059.4	1,612.4					
Alliance	Chelsea Harwood	10.74%	1,016	1,121.6	1,146.1	1,232.1				
TUV	Matthew Warwick	8.88%	840	840.5	940.5	1,128.5	1,134.95	1,146.95	1,152.17	1,162.63
DUP	Julie Philpott	9.21%	872	872.2	893.2	1,045.2	1,098.6	1,120.6	1,150.87	1,152.04
UUP	Keith Turner*	7.50%	710	710.9						
Electorate: 17,809 Valid: 9,463 (53.14%) Spoilt: 89 Quota: 1,183 Turnout: 9,552 (53.64%)

=== Carrick Castle ===
2019: 2 x DUP, 2 x UUP, 1 x Alliance

2023: 2 x DUP, 2 x UUP, 1 x Alliance

2019–2023 Change: No change

Carrick Castle - 5 seats
Party	Candidate	FPv%	Count						
Party	Candidate	FPv%	1	2	3	4	5	6	7
Alliance	Lauren Gray*	25.70%	1,607						
DUP	Cheryl Brownlee* †	18.45%	1,154						
DUP	Billy Ashe*	16.47%	1,030	1,047.48					
UUP	Robin Stewart*	12.01%	751	874.50	883.50	926.39	1,021.01	1,048.01	
UUP	Bethany Ferris	11.29%	706	813.92	823.91	849.54	936.77	973.77	1,070.67
TUV	Frances Henderson	6.99%	437	446.1	455.57	501.56	611.29	617.29	629.07
Green (NI)	Jenny Hutchinson	2.17%	136	420.62	421.88	425.87	426.97		
DUP	John McDermott*	4.30%	269	272.04	337.83	373.08			
PUP	Jim McCaw	2.62%	164	169.32	175.44				
Electorate: 13,886 Valid: 6,254 (45.04%) Spoilt: 71 Quota: 1,043 Turnout: 6,325 (45.54%)

=== Coast Road ===
2019: 2 x DUP, 1 x Alliance, 1 x Sinn Féin, 1 x UUP

2023: 2 x DUP, 1 x Alliance, 1 x Sinn Féin, 1 x UUP

2019–2023 Change: No change

Coast Road - 5 seats
Party	Candidate	FPv%	Count							
Party	Candidate	FPv%	1	2	3	4	5	6	7	8
Sinn Féin	James McKeown*	20.08%	1,180							
DUP	Andrew Clarke*	18.90%	1,111							
Alliance	Gerardine Mulvenna*	18.61%	1,094							
DUP	Angela Smyth*	13.75%	808	808.42	905.33	912.76	914.06	977.37	1,199.37	
UUP	Maureen Morrow*	7.78%	457	463.93	477.02	489.49	493.69	705.44	828.91	1,006.91
Alliance	Niamh Spurle	7.62%	448	587.65	588.31	678	776.9	795.02	800.35	801.35
TUV	Wesley Stevenson	5.79%	340	340.21	347.36	351.99	352.19	383.74		
UUP	Olivia Swan	5.55%	326	326.63	329.38	337.38	339.68			
Green (NI)	Eddie Alcorn	1.92%	113	159.83	160.49					
Electorate: 12,799 Valid: 5,877 (45.92%) Spoilt: 60 Quota: 980 Turnout: 5,937 (46.39%)

=== Knockagh ===
2019: 2 x DUP, 1 x UUP, 1 x Alliance, 1 x Independent

2023: 2 x DUP, 1 x Alliance, 1 x UUP, 1 x Independent

2019–2023 Change: No change

Knockagh - 5 seats
Party	Candidate	FPv%	Count				
Party	Candidate	FPv%	1	2	3	4	5
Independent	Bobby Hadden*	18.22%	1,182				
DUP	Peter Johnston*	17.64%	1,144				
DUP	Marc Collins*	14.35%	931	957.19	1,191.19		
UUP	Andrew Wilson*	12.21%	792	809.19	868.19	1,266.15	
Alliance	Aaron Skinner	13.92%	903	917.58	919.67	954.67	1,075.81
Alliance	Noel Williams*	11.61%	753	763.53	770.89	788.67	856.48
UUP	Gary McCabe	6.68%	433	446.23	478.23		
TUV	James Strange	5.37%	348	358.53			
Electorate: 13,223 Valid: 6,486 (49.05%) Spoilt: 59 Quota: 1,082 Turnout: 6,545 (49.50%)

=== Larne Lough ===
2019: 2 x DUP, 2 x Alliance, 1 x UUP

2023: 2 x Alliance, 2 x DUP, 1 x UUP

2019–2023 Change: No change

Larne Lough - 5 seats
Party	Candidate	FPv%	Count					
Party	Candidate	FPv%	1	2	3	4	5	6
Alliance	Maeve Donnelly*	21.69%	1,389					
DUP	Gregg McKeen*	18.69%	1,197					
UUP	Roy Beggs Jr	17.78%	1,139					
Alliance	Robert Logan*	10.87%	696	996.15	1,165.15			
DUP	Paul Reid*	13.46%	862	864.53	867.76	972.26	975.26	1,224.26
UUP	James Carson	7.49%	480	485.06	500.90	506.70	563.70	692.70
TUV	Ronnie Donnell	6.67%	427	427.23	433.69	441.69	444.69	
Green (NI)	Philip Randle	3.36%	215	223.51				
Electorate: 13,744 Valid: 6,405 (46.60%) Spoilt: 108 Quota: 1,068 Turnout: 6,513 (47.39%)

== Changes during the term ==
=== † Co-options ===
Date co-opted	Electoral Area	Party	Outgoing	Co-optee	Reason
8 September 2023	Ballymena	Alliance	John Hyland	Jack Gibson	Hyland resigned.
3 October 2023	Carrick Castle	DUP	Cheryl Brownlee	David Clarke	Brownlee was co-opted to the Northern Ireland Assembly.
23 July 2024	Bannside	TUV	Timothy Gaston	Anna Henry	Gaston was co-opted to the Northern Ireland Assembly.
13 August 2024	Ballymena	UUP	Colin Crawford	Brian Thompson	Crawford was co-opted to the Northern Ireland Assembly.
17 April 2025	Braid	DUP	Beth Adger	Ruth Lawrence	Adger died.

=== ‡ Changes in affiliation ===
Date	Electoral Area	Name	Previous affiliation	New affiliation	Circumstance
19 January 2024	Carrick Castle	David Clarke	DUP	Independent	Left the DUP following claims of bullying.
15 March 2024	Carrick Castle	David Clarke	Independent	TUV	Joined the TUV.
18 August 2025	Ballymena	Lawrie Philpott	DUP	Independent	Left the DUP, wanting to focus more on local needs than party politics.
