= Cheryl Brownlee =

Northern Irish politician (born 1991/1992)

Cheryl Brownlee MLA
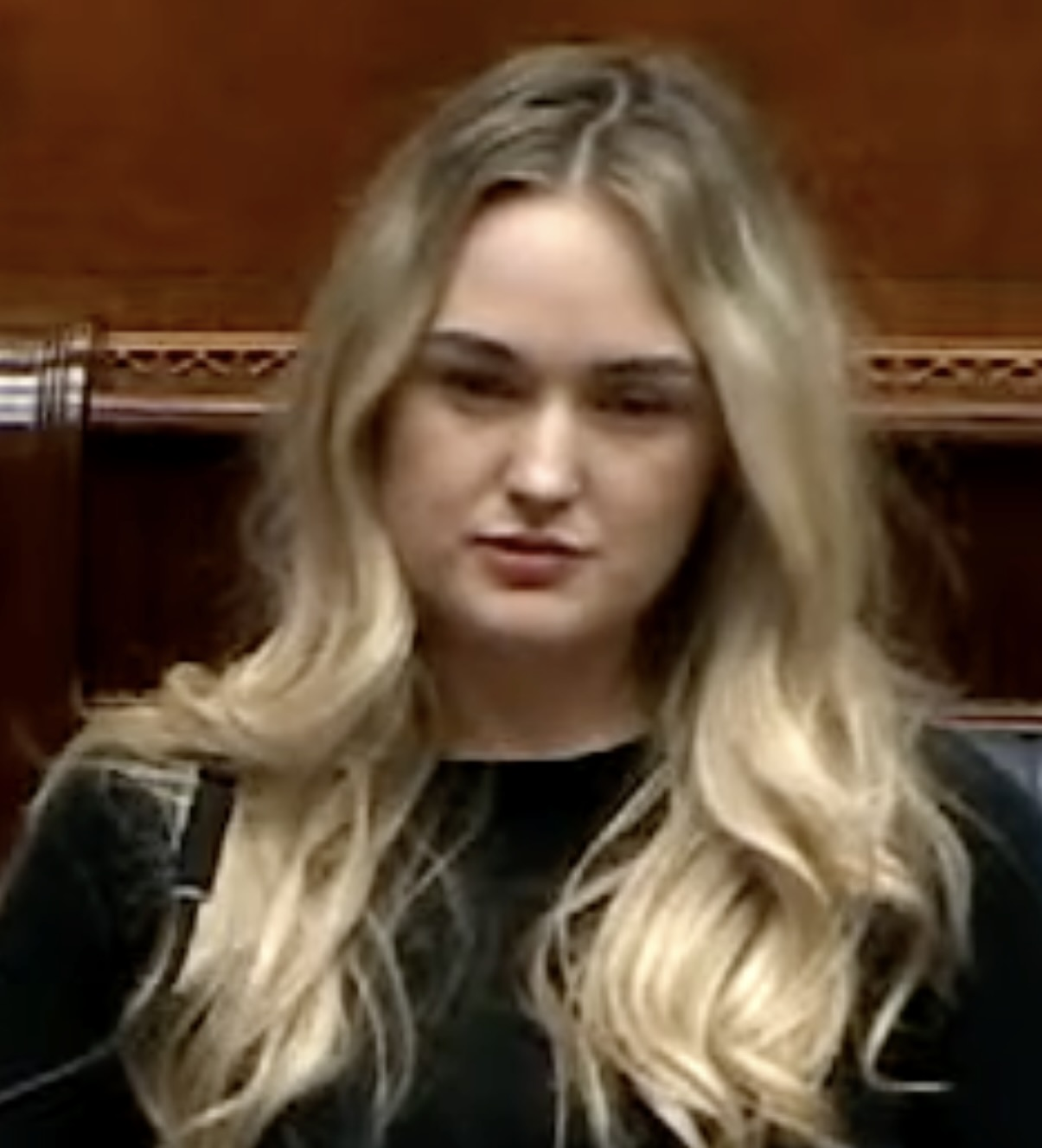

Member of the Northern Ireland Assembly for East Antrim
- Incumbent
- Assumed office 18 September 2023
- Preceded by: David Hilditch

Member of Mid and East Antrim Borough Council
- In office 22 May 2014 – 18 September 2023
- Preceded by: Council created
- Succeeded by: David Clarke
- Constituency: Carrick Castle

Personal details
- Born: Cheryl Johnston; 1991 or 1992 (age 33–34)
- Party: Democratic Unionist Party

Cheryl Brownlee (born 1991 or 1992) is a Democratic Unionist Party (DUP) politician, serving as a Member of the Northern Ireland Assembly (MLA) for East Antrim since 2023.

She was previously a Mid and East Antrim Councillor for the Carrick Castle DEA from 2014 to 2023.

== Political career ==
Brownlee was first elected to Mid and East Antrim Borough Council in 2014, as a DUP representative for the Carrick Castle District; she was re-elected in the 2019 and 2023 Council elections.

=== Member of the Northern Ireland Assembly ===
In September 2023, Brownlee replaced David Hilditch as MLA for East Antrim, following the latter's decision to stand down due to ill health. Cheryl has engaged in a number of key policy items such as spreading awareness of autism and ADHD and promoting the baby loss certificate in Northern Ireland. She also has promoted Northern Ireland's marching bands culture.
