= Bréanainn Lyness =

Sinn Féin councillor in Northern Ireland

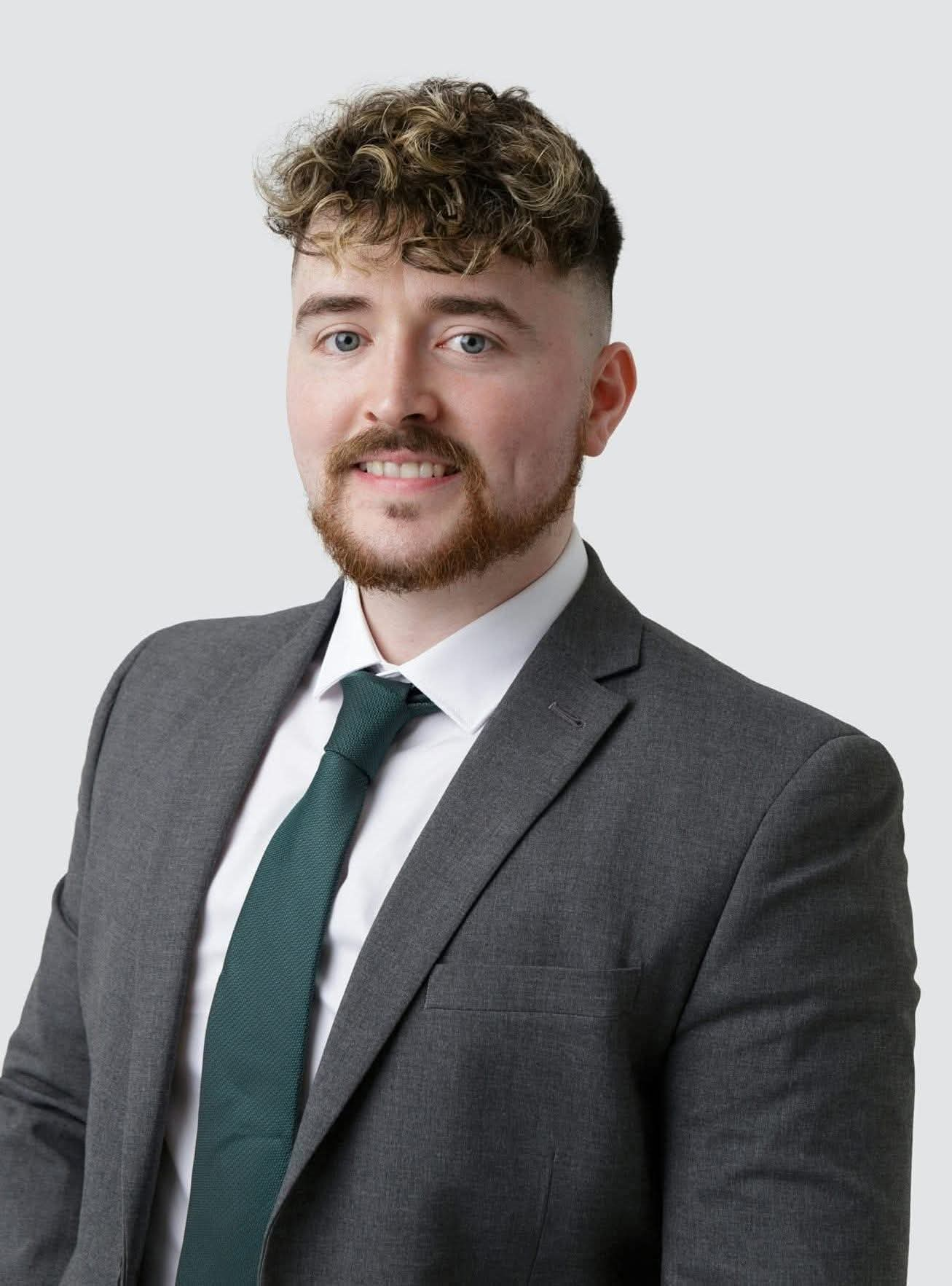

Deputy Mayor of Mid and East Antrim
- In office 3 June 2024 – 2 June 2025
- Preceded by: Stewart McDonald

Member of Mid and East Antrim Borough Council
- Incumbent
- Assumed office 18 May 2023
- Constituency: Ballymena

Personal details
- Born: c. 1993 Ballymena, Northern Ireland
- Party: Sinn Féin
- Education: Queen's University Belfast
- Occupation: Politician

Bréanainn Lyness (born c. 1993) is an Irish Sinn Féin politician who has served as a councillor on Mid and East Antrim Borough Council for the Ballymena district electoral area since May 2023. He was Deputy Mayor of Mid and East Antrim from June 2024 to June 2025, the first Sinn Féin councillor and the first Irish republican to hold the office.

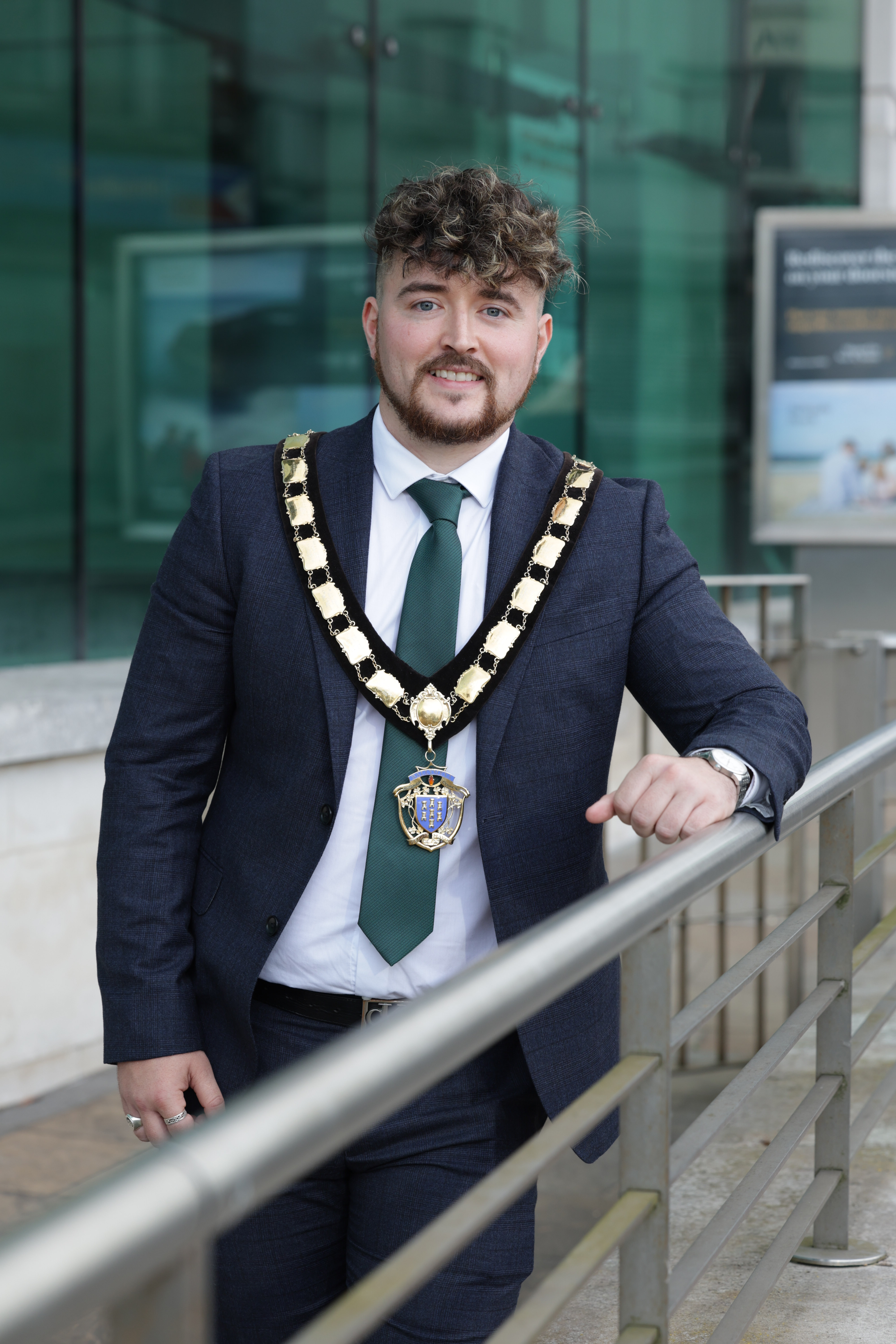
Deputy Mayor Bréanainn Lyness 2024

Lyness was also the first Irish republican and Sinn Féin candidate elected to represent Ballymena town on the council.

== Early life and education ==
Lyness is from Ballymena. He has described a family background with republican and nationalist roots. His mother, Rosie Lyness, has organised Irish-language classes at a local parish centre. His grandfather, Henry McAlinden, was a founding member of All Saints GAC and stood as a candidate for the Irish Independence Party in Ballymena in 1978.

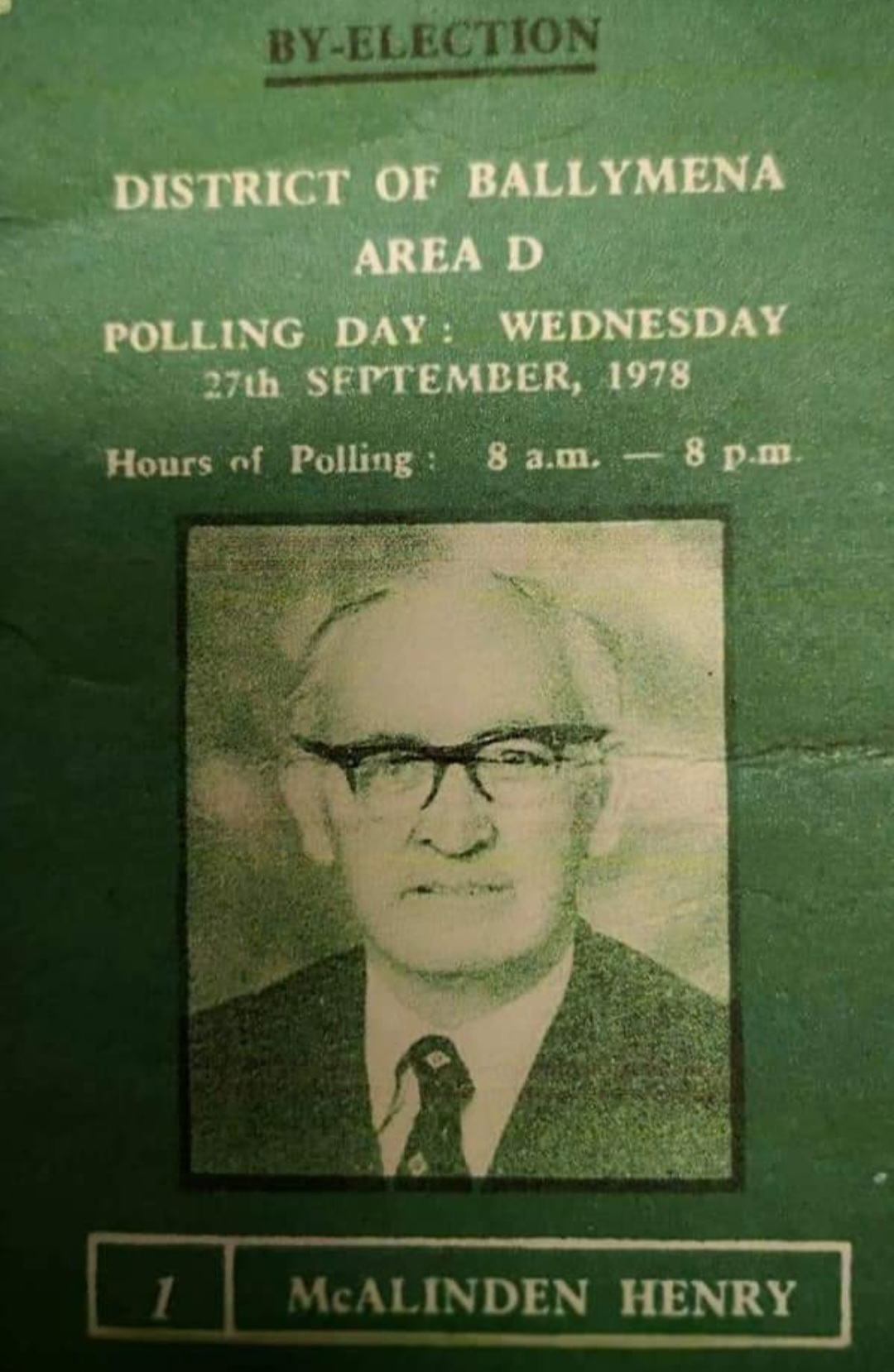
Henry McAlinden 1978

He was educated at St Louis Primary School, St Patrick's Secondary School and Northern Regional College at Farmlodge before attending Queen's University Belfast. He completed an undergraduate degree in International Politics and Conflict Studies (2014–2017) and a master's degree in Violence, Terrorism and Security (2017–2018).; winning the Feargal McConville Prize in European Studies which is officially awarded annually to the postgraduate student who achieves the best dissertation in the MA European Politics (or MA EU Politics) program. News reports at the time of his selection described the postgraduate qualification as a master's degree in political studies.

From the age of 13 he worked with the Irish-language organisation Gael Linn.

== Career ==
After university Lyness worked with New York City Council and the Emerald Isle Immigration Center in New York, working with migrant communities. On returning to Northern Ireland he worked as a staff officer in the Northern Ireland Civil Service at The Executive Office, contributing to the Ending Violence Against Women and Girls strategy.

=== Local government ===
Sinn Féin selected Lyness as its candidate for Ballymena town ahead of the 2023 Northern Ireland local elections. In April 2023 he was reported as 30 years old. At the election on 18 May 2023 he was elected on the first count with 926 first-preference votes (12.69 per cent), becoming the first Sinn Féin councillor returned for Ballymena town. Coverage of the results noted the result in the hometown of the late Ian Paisley.

He sits on the council's Corporate Resources, Policy and Governance Committee, Neighbourhood and Communities Committee, and Environment and Economy Committee.

On 3 June 2024 the council appointed Lyness Deputy Mayor, the first time a Sinn Féin member had held the office in Mid and East Antrim. In his acceptance remarks he said he would "work for everyone and with everyone" and described the appointment as another historic moment for the borough as its first republican deputy mayor. He left the civic office at the annual general meeting in June 2025. In his outgoing speech he spoke in Irish and emphasised mutual respect, opposition to discrimination, and cross-community engagement.

In February 2026 Lyness abstained on a 2.95 per cent district rates increase after other Sinn Féin members on the council voted in favour. He said he could not "in good conscience" support the rise while Ballymena town centre businesses were closing, and described the abstention as a stand against "wasteful spending" rather than avoidance of the vote.

=== Gracehill World Heritage Site ===
In July 2024 the Moravian settlement of Gracehill, near Ballymena, was inscribed on the UNESCO World Heritage List as part of the transnational Moravian Church Settlements site, alongside Bethlehem, Pennsylvania, Herrnhut in Germany and Christiansfeld in Denmark. It became Northern Ireland's first cultural World Heritage Site; the Giant's Causeway had been listed as a natural site since 1986.

As Deputy Mayor, Lyness represented Mid and East Antrim Borough Council in the United States in connection with the bid. On 15 May 2025 he attended the presentation of the official certificate of inscription at Gracehill, where the UK's Permanent Delegate to UNESCO, Anna Nsubuga, handed over the documents. Other attendees included Mayor William McCaughey, Communities Minister Gordon Lyons and Deputy First Minister Emma Little-Pengelly.

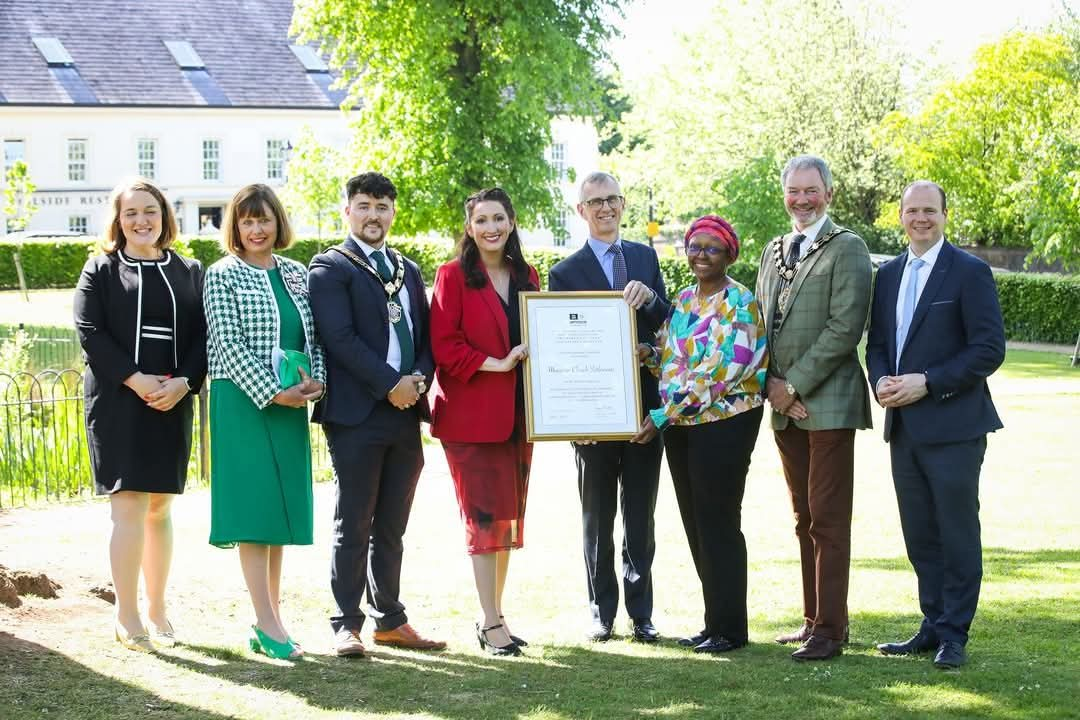
Gracehill's World Heritage Status 2025

=== 2025 Ballymena riots ===
In June 2025 anti-immigrant riots broke out in Ballymena after two Romanian Roma teenagers were charged in connection with an alleged sexual assault. A vigil on 9 June was initially peaceful; masked groups then attacked minority-ethnic homes. Police described the violence as "racist thuggery" and "clearly racially motivated".

Lyness was among the first local elected representatives to condemn the disorder as racist. On Facebook he wrote:

What began as a legitimate, peaceful protest by the family for the protection of Women & Girls has been hijacked into an attack on the Roma community in Ballymena. This is an absolute disgrace. Racism and xenophobia have no place in our society, and now an entire community is suffering because of the actions of a few sinister individuals. This is not Justice... it is Wrong.

He told The Journal that the peaceful protest had widespread support, but that what followed was "racist violence". He said:

Ballymena does have a problem with sexual assaults towards young women, but the perpetrators have come from all backgrounds. What we had here was a group of people who scapegoated the Roma community, and used the protest as a cover for racism and abuse.

== Controversies ==
=== Broughshane Christmas lights ===
In November 2024 Lyness deputised for Mayor Beth Adger at the switching-on of Christmas lights in Broughshane, after Adger attended Ballymena's ceremony on the same evening. Broughshane Loyal Orange Lodge 503 criticised the invitation, saying a Sinn Féin representative's presence was "deeply divisive" because of the party's "historical associations" and what the lodge called an "unrepentant position on the terrorism they waged". The lodge was supported by the local Apprentice Boys and a loyalist bonfire group.

Lyness told the Belfast Telegraph the event was "mostly welcoming". He said he later realised that someone had shouted "Sinn Féin murderer" (or "IRA murderers", in another account) during his speech, that he continued, and that he received applause at the end. He said he represented everyone in the borough, lived nearby, and was "not a blow-in".

In the early hours of 27 November windows were smashed at Broughshane House, a community building used by local charities, and graffiti reading "No SF IRA" was sprayed on the wall. Police investigated the damage as criminal damage. The charity occupying the premises said it could not understand those who damaged their own community. An Irish News editorial described the original row as an example of a community event being "sectarianised" and said Lyness had been well received on the night.
