= Mid and East Antrim Borough Council =

Local authority in Northern Ireland

Type
- Type: District council of Mid and East Antrim

History
- Founded: 1 April 2015
- Preceded by: Ballymena Borough Council; Carrickfergus Borough Council; Larne Borough Council

Leadership
- Mayor: Thomas Gordon, Democratic Unionist Party
- Deputy Mayor: Bethany Carson-Ferris, Ulster Unionist Party

Structure
- Seats: 40
- Graph of the party split among 40 seats.
- Political groups: All parties (40) DUP (12) UUP (8) Alliance (7) TUV (6) Sinn Féin (4) Independent (3)
- Length of term: 4 years

Elections
- Voting system: Single transferable vote
- Last election: 18 May 2023
- Next election: 6 May 2027

Meeting place
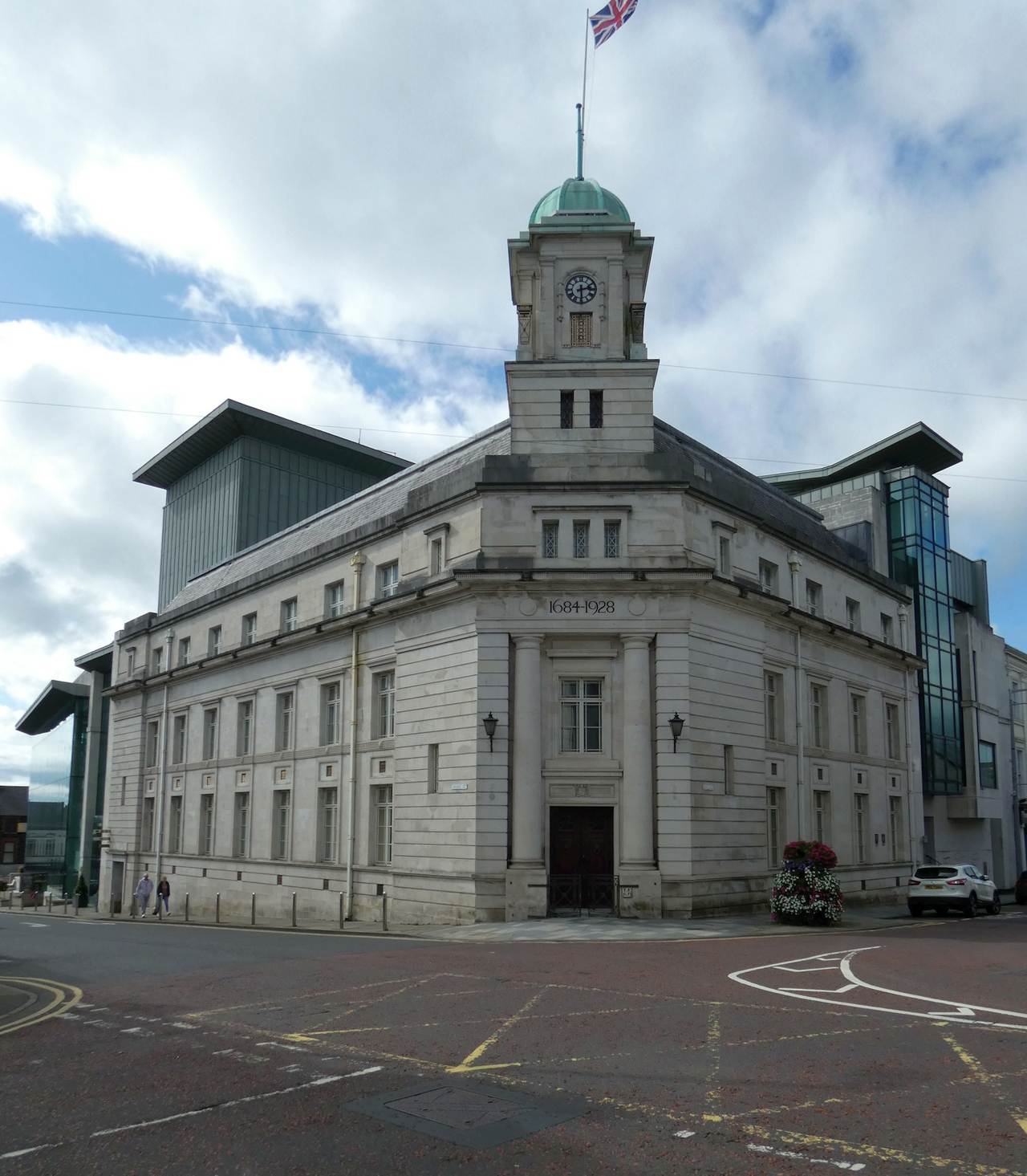
- The Braid, 1–29 Bridge Street, Ballymena, BT43 5EJ

Website
- www.midandeastantrim.gov.uk

Mid and East Antrim Borough Council is a local authority that was established on 1 April 2015. It replaced Ballymena Borough Council, Carrickfergus Borough Council and Larne Borough Council.

== History ==
On 2 December 2021, the councils chief executive Anne Donaghy was suspended and stated her intention to take legal action for discrimination. In January 2023, she announced her retirement.

In 2022, another DUP councillor, Marc Collins, was suspended for abusive tweets directed at Sinn Féin MP John Finucane and his family.

== Mayoralty ==
=== Mayor ===
From	To	Name	Party
2015	2016	Billy Ashe	DUP
2016	2017	Audrey Wales	DUP
2017	2018	Paul Reid	DUP
2018	2019	Lindsay Millar	UUP
2019	2020	Maureen Morrow	UUP
2020	2021	Peter Johnston	DUP
2021	2022	William McCaughey	DUP
2022	2023	Noel Williams	Alliance
2023	2024	Gerardine Mulvenna	Alliance
2024	2025	Beth Adger	DUP
2025	2025	William McCaughey	DUP
2025	2026	Jackson Minford	UUP
2026	Present	Thomas Gordon	DUP

=== Deputy Mayor ===
From	To	Name	Party
2015	2016	Timothy Gaston	TUV
2016	2017	William McNeilly	UUP
2017	2018	Cheryl Johnston	DUP
2018	2019	Cheryl Johnston	DUP
2019	2020	Beth Adger	DUP
2020	2021	Andrew Wilson	UUP
2021	2022	Matthew Armstrong	TUV
2022	2023	Beth Adger	DUP
2023	2024	Stewart McDonald	TUV
2024	2025	Bréanainn Lyness	Sinn Féin
2025	2026	Tyler Hoey	DUP
2026	Present	Bethany Carson-Ferris	UUP

== Councillors ==
For the purpose of elections the council is divided into seven district electoral areas (DEA):

Area	Seats
Ballymena	7
Bannside	6
Braid	7
Carrick Castle	5
Coast Road	5
Knockagh	5
Larne Lough	5

=== Party strengths ===
Party	Elected 2014	Elected 2019	Elected 2023	Current
DUP	16	15	14	12
UUP	9	7	8	8
Alliance	3	7	7	7
TUV	5	5	5	6
Sinn Féin	3	2	4	4
Independent	2	3	2	3
SDLP	1	1	0	0
UKIP	1	0	0	0

=== Councillors by electoral area ===
Borders of the DEAs within Mid and East Antrim

Current council members
District electoral area	Name	Party
Ballymena	Rodney Quigley	Independent
Ballymena	Matthew Armstrong	TUV
Ballymena	Brian Thompson †	UUP
Ballymena	Bréanainn Lyness	Sinn Féin
Ballymena	Reuben Glover	DUP
Ballymena	Jack Gibson †	Alliance
Ballymena	Lawrie Philpott ‡	Independent
Bannside	Anna Henry †	TUV
Bannside	Stewart McDonald	TUV
Bannside	Ian Friary	Sinn Féin
Bannside	Thomas Gordon	DUP
Bannside	Tyler Hoey	DUP
Bannside	Jackson Minford	UUP
Braid	Archie Rae	Sinn Féin
Braid	Ruth Lawrence †	DUP
Braid	William McCaughey	DUP
Braid	Christopher Jamieson	TUV
Braid	Alan Barr	UUP
Braid	Chelsea Harwood	Alliance
Braid	Matthew Warwick	TUV
Carrick Castle	Lauren Gray	Alliance
Carrick Castle	David Clarke †‡‡	TUV
Carrick Castle	Billy Ashe	DUP
Carrick Castle	Robin Stewart	UUP
Carrick Castle	Bethany Ferris	UUP
Coast Road	James McKeown	Sinn Féin
Coast Road	Andrew Clarke	DUP
Coast Road	Geraldine Mulvenna	Alliance
Coast Road	Angela Smyth	DUP
Coast Road	Maureen Morrow	UUP
Knockagh	Bobby Hadden	Independent
Knockagh	Peter Johnston	DUP
Knockagh	Marc Collins	DUP
Knockagh	Andrew Wilson	UUP
Knockagh	Aaron Skinner	Alliance
Larne Lough	Maeve Donnelly	Alliance
Larne Lough	Gregg McKeen	DUP
Larne Lough	Roy Beggs Jr	UUP
Larne Lough	Robert Logan	Alliance
Larne Lough	Paul Reid	DUP

== Premises ==
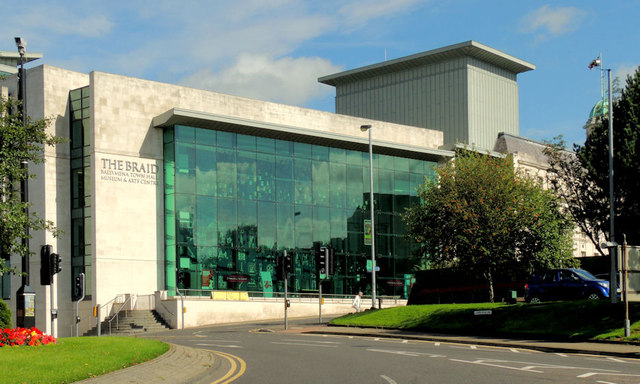
The Braid: 2008 extension behind the older Town Hall

The council is based at The Braid at 1–29 Bridge Street in Ballymena. The building comprises the old Ballymena Town Hall, completed in 1928, and a large modern extension along Bridge Street, completed in 2008. The building was formerly the headquarters of Ballymena Borough Council and also includes a museum and arts centre.

== Population ==
The area covered by the council has a population of 135,338 residents according to the 2011 Northern Ireland census.
