= List of elections in 2005 =

The following elections occurred in the year 2005.

- 2005 United Nations Security Council election

== Africa ==
- 2005 Burkinabé presidential election
- 2005 Burundian Senate election
- 2005 Burundian communal elections
- 2005 Burundian constitutional referendum
- 2005 Burundian legislative election
- 2005 Burundian presidential election
- 2005 Central African Republic general election
- 2005 Chadian constitutional referendum
- 2005 Democratic Republic of the Congo constitutional referendum
- 2005 Djiboutian presidential election
- 2005 Egyptian parliamentary election
- 2005 Egyptian constitutional referendum
- 2005 Egyptian presidential election
- 2005 Ethiopian general election
- 2005 Gabonese presidential election
- 2005 Guinea-Bissau presidential election
- 2005 Kenyan constitutional referendum
- 2005 Liberian general election
- 2005 Mauritian general election
- 2005 Zimbabwean parliamentary election
- 2005 Somaliland parliamentary election
- 2005 Puntland presidential election
- 2005 Tanzanian general election
- 2005 Togolese presidential election
- 2005 Zimbabwean Senate election
- 2005 Zimbabwean parliamentary election

== Asia ==
- 2005 Abkhazian presidential election
- 2005 Armenian constitutional referendum
- 2005 Azerbaijani parliamentary election
- 2005 Afghan parliamentary election
- 2004–05 East Timorese local elections
- 2005 Egyptian parliamentary election
- 2005 Egyptian presidential election
- 2005 Hong Kong Chief Executive election
- 2005 Iranian presidential election
- 2005 Kazakhstani presidential election
- 2005 Kuomintang chairmanship election
- 2005 Kyrgyzstani presidential election
- 2005 Kyrgyz parliamentary election
- 2005 Lebanese general election
- 2005 Maldivian parliamentary election
- 2005 Macanese legislative election
- 2005 Mongolian presidential election
- 2005 Nagorno-Karabakh parliamentary election
- 2004–05 Palestinian local elections
- 2005 Palestinian presidential election
- 2005 Republic of China National Assembly election
- 2005 Japanese general election
- 2005 Saudi Arabian municipal elections
- ~~2005 Singaporean presidential election~~
- 2005 Sri Lankan presidential election
- 2005 Republic of China local elections
- 2005 Tajikistani parliamentary election
- 2005 Thai general election
- 2004–2005 Uzbek parliamentary election

=== India ===
- Bihar Assembly Election, Feb 2005
- Bihar Assembly Election, Oct 2005
- State Assembly elections in India, 2005

=== Iraq ===
- 2005 Al-Anbar governorate council election
- 2005 Babil governorate council election
- 2005 Kurdistan Region governorate elections
- 2005 Kurdistan Region independence referendum
- 2005 Iraqi governorate elections
- December 2005 Iraqi parliamentary election
- January 2005 Iraqi parliamentary election
- 2005 Ninawa governorate council election

=== Japan ===
- 2005 Hino mayoral election
- 2005 Ibaraki gubernatorial election
- 2005 Japanese general election
- 2005 Kawasaki mayoral election
- 2005 Kiso mayoral election
- 2005 Kobe mayoral election
- 2005 Miyagi gubernatorial election
- 2005 Nagaokakyō city assembly election
- 2005 Saitama mayoral election
- 2005 Tokyo prefectural election
- 2005 Yuzawa mayoral election

=== Malaysia ===
- 2005 Pengkalan Pasir by-election

=== Philippines ===
- 2005 Autonomous Region in Muslim Mindanao general election

== Europe ==
- 2005 Albanian parliamentary election
- 2005 Andorran parliamentary election
- 2005 Bulgarian parliamentary election
- 2005 Croatian presidential election
- 2005 Croatian local elections
- 2005 Danish local elections
- 2005 Danish parliamentary election
- 2005 Dutch European Constitution referendum
- 2005 French European Constitution referendum
- 2005 Greek presidential election
- 2005 Hungarian presidential election
- 2005 Jersey general election
- 2005 Kazakhstani presidential election
- 2005 Liechtenstein general election
- 2005 Liechtenstein constitutional referendum
- 2005 Luxembourg European Constitution referendum
- 2005 Luxembourg communal elections
- 2005 Maltese local council elections
- 2005 Nagorno-Karabakh parliamentary election
- 2005 Northern Cyprus presidential election
- 2005 Northern Cyprus parliamentary election
- 2005 Norwegian Sami parliamentary election
- 2005 Norwegian parliamentary election
- 2005 Polish parliamentary election
- 2005 Polish presidential election
- 2005 Portuguese legislative election
- 2005 Portuguese local elections
- 2005 Serbian local elections
- 2005 Swiss referendums
- 2005 Zagreb local elections

=== Austria ===
- 2005 Burgenland state election
- 2005 Styrian state election
- 2005 Viennese state election

=== Germany ===
- 2005 German federal election
- 2005 North Rhine-Westphalia state election
- 2005 Schleswig-Holstein state election

=== Italy ===
- 2005 Abruzzo regional election
- 2005 Apulian regional election
- 2005 Basilicata regional election
- 2005 Calabrian regional election
- 2005 Campania regional election
- 2005 Emilia-Romagna regional election
- 2005 Italian regional elections
- 2005 Lazio regional election
- 2005 Ligurian regional election
- 2005 Lombard regional election
- 2005 Marche regional election
- 2005 Piedmontese regional election
- 2005 Tuscan regional election
- 2005 Umbrian regional election
- 2005 Venetian regional election

=== Moldova ===
- 2005 Chişinău election
- 2005 Moldovan parliamentary election
- 2005 Moldovan presidential election
- 2005 Transnistrian legislative election

=== Spain ===
- 2005 Basque parliamentary election
- 2005 Galician parliamentary election

=== United Kingdom ===
- 2005 United Kingdom general election
  - England: 2005 United Kingdom general election in England
  - Scotland: 2005 United Kingdom general election in Scotland
  - Wales: 2005 United Kingdom general election in Wales
  - Northern Ireland: 2005 United Kingdom general election in Northern Ireland
  - List of MPs elected in the 2005 United Kingdom general election
- 2005 Auchtertool and Burntisland East by-election
- 2005 Cheadle by-election
- 2005 Conservative Party leadership election
- 2005 United Kingdom elections
- 2005 Glasgow Cathcart by-election
- 2005 Livingston by-election
- 2005 United Kingdom local elections
- 2005 Ulster Unionist Party leadership election

==== United Kingdom local ====
- 2005 United Kingdom local elections
- 2005 Northern Ireland local elections

===== English local =====
- 2005 Isle of Wight Council election
- 2005 Lancashire County Council election
- 2005 Lincolnshire County Council election
- 2005 North Tyneside mayoral election
- 2005 Shropshire County Council election
- 2005 Suffolk County Council election
- 2005 Warwickshire County Council election
- 2005 West Sussex County Council election
- 2005 Wiltshire Council election

===== Scottish local =====
- 2005 Auchtertool and Burntisland East by-election

==== United Kingdom general ====
- List of MPs elected in the 2005 United Kingdom general election
- 2005 United Kingdom general election
- 2005 United Kingdom general election result in Cornwall
- 2005 United Kingdom general election result in Essex
- 2005 United Kingdom general election result in Glasgow
- 2005 United Kingdom general election result in Greater Manchester
- 2005 United Kingdom general election result in Surrey
- 2005 United Kingdom general election result in West Yorkshire
- 2005 United Kingdom general election result in Merseyside
- 2005 United Kingdom general election results in Lancashire
- 2005 United Kingdom general election results in Scotland
- 2005 List of parties contesting the United Kingdom general election
- 2005 Marginal constituencies in the United Kingdom general election
- List of United Kingdom Parliament constituencies 2005–2010
- 2005 Pre–election day events of the United Kingdom general election
- 2005 Constituency results of the United Kingdom general election
- 2005 Results breakdown of the United Kingdom general election
- Vote-OK

== New Zealand general ==
- 2005 New Zealand general election
  - List of electorates in the 2005 New Zealand general election by party vote
  - Opinion polling for the 2005 New Zealand general election
  - Party lists in the 2005 New Zealand general election
  - 2005 New Zealand election funding controversy

== North America ==
- 2005 Greenlandic parliamentary election
- 2005 Honduran general election
- 2005 Organization of American States Secretary General election

=== Canada ===
- 2005 Alberta Alliance Party leadership election
- 2005 British Columbia electoral reform referendum
- 2005 British Columbia general election
- 2005 British Columbia municipal elections
- 2002 Bromont municipal election
- 2005 Bromont municipal election
- 2005 Montreal municipal election
- 2005 New Brunswick New Democratic Party leadership election
- 2005 Newfoundland and Labrador municipal elections
- 2005 Parti Québécois leadership election
- 2005 Prince Edward Island electoral reform referendum
- 2005 Vancouver municipal election

==== Quebec municipal ====
- 2005 Quebec municipal elections
- Quebec municipal elections, 2005, results in Bas-Saint-Laurent
- Quebec municipal elections, 2005, results in Capitale-Nationale
- Quebec municipal elections, 2005, results in Centre-du-Québec
- Quebec municipal elections, 2005, results in Chaudière-Appalaches
- Quebec municipal elections, 2005, results in Côte-Nord
- Quebec municipal elections, 2005, results in Estrie
- Quebec municipal elections, 2005, results in Gaspésie-Îles-de-la-Madeleine

=== Caribbean ===
- 2005 Anguillan general election
- 2005 Aruban general election
- 2005 Caymanian general election
- 2005 Dominican general election
- 2005 Saint Vincent and the Grenadines general election
- 2005 Tobago House of Assembly election

==== Puerto Rican ====
- 2005 Puerto Rican unicameralism referendum

=== Mexico ===
- 2005 Mexican elections
- 2005 Coahuila state election
- 2005 Colima gubernatorial election
- 2005 México state election

=== Puerto Rican ===
- 2005 Puerto Rican unicameralism referendum

=== United States ===
- 2005 United States elections

==== United States House of Representatives ====
- 2005 United States House of Representatives elections
- 2005 California's 5th congressional district special election
- 2005 California's 48th congressional district special election
- 2005 Ohio's 2nd congressional district special election

==== United States lieutenant gubernatorial ====
- 2005 Virginia lieutenant gubernatorial election

==== United States gubernatorial ====
- 2005 New Jersey gubernatorial election
- 2005 Northern Mariana Islands gubernatorial election
- 2005 United States gubernatorial elections
- 2005 Virginia gubernatorial election
- 2005 Pennsylvania state elections

==== United States mayoral ====
- 2005 Albuquerque mayoral election
- 2005 Allentown mayoral election
- 2005 Arlington mayoral election
- 2005 Atlanta mayoral election
- 2005 Boston mayoral election
- 2005 Buffalo mayoral election
- 2005 Charlotte mayoral election
- 2005 Cincinnati mayoral election
- 2005 Cleveland mayoral election
- 2001 Dayton mayoral election
- 2005 Detroit mayoral election
- 2005 Durham mayoral election
- 2005 El Paso mayoral election
- 2005 Fayetteville, North Carolina mayoral election
- 2005 Fort Worth mayoral election
- 2005 Hialeah mayoral election
- Hoboken election of 2005
- 2005 Houston mayoral election
- 2005 Jersey City mayoral election
- Juneau, Alaska, regular election, 2005
- 2005 Lansing mayoral election
- 2005 Manchester, New Hampshire, mayoral election
- 2005 Miami mayoral election
- 2005 Minneapolis municipal election
- 2005 Mobile, Alabama mayoral election
- 2005 New York City mayoral election
- 2005 Omaha mayoral election
- 2005 Pittsburgh mayoral election
- 2005 Raleigh mayoral election
- 2005 Riverside, California mayoral election
- 2005 San Antonio mayoral election
- 2005–06 San Bernardino mayoral election
- 2005 San Diego mayoral special election
- 2005 Seattle mayoral election
- 2005 St. Louis mayoral election
- 2005 Saint Paul mayoral election
- 2005 St. Petersburg, Florida, mayoral election
- 2005 Springfield, Massachusetts mayoral election
- 2005 Winston-Salem mayoral election
- 2005 Worcester, Massachusetts mayoral election

==== California ====
- November 2005 San Francisco general election

==== Northern Mariana Islands ====
- 2005 Northern Mariana Islands general election
- 2005 Northern Mariana Islands gubernatorial election

==== Puerto Rican ====
- 2005 Puerto Rican unicameralism referendum

==== Virginia ====
- Creigh Deeds attorney general campaign, 2005

==== Washington (U.S. state) ====
- Washington Initiative 912 (2005)

== Oceania ==
- 2005 Fijian municipal election
- 2005 Micronesian parliamentary election
- 2005 New Zealand general election
- 2005 Niuas by-election
- 2005 Niuean general election
- 2005 Northern Mariana Islands gubernatorial election
- 2005 Tongan general election
- 2005 Tongatapu by-election

=== Australia ===
- 2005 Chatsworth state by-election
- 2005 Macquarie Fields state by-election
- 2005 Maroubra state by-election
- 2005 Marrickville state by-election
- 2005 Northern Territory general election
- 2005 Pittwater state by-election
- 2005 Redcliffe state by-election
- 2005 Western Australian retail trading hours referendum
- 2005 Western Australian state election

=== New Zealand ===
- 2005 New Zealand general election

==== New Zealand general ====
- 2005 New Zealand election funding controversy
- List of electorates in the New Zealand general election, 2005, by party vote
- 2005 New Zealand general election
- 2005 Opinion polling for the New Zealand general election
- 2005 Party lists in the New Zealand general election

=== Northern Mariana Islands ===
- 2005 Northern Mariana Islands general election
- 2005 Northern Mariana Islands gubernatorial election

== South America ==
- 2005 Argentine legislative election
- 2005 Bolivian legislative election
- 2005 Bolivian presidential election
- 2005 Brazilian firearms and ammunition referendum
- 2005 Chilean parliamentary election
- 2005–06 Chilean general election
- 2005 Falkland Islands general election
- 2005 Organization of American States Secretary General election
- 2005 Surinamese legislative election
- 2005 Uruguayan municipal elections
- 2005 Venezuelan parliamentary election
