= Unicameralism =

Governmental practice of having a single legislative or parliamentary chamber

Unicameralism (from uni- "one" & Latin camera "chamber") is a type of legislature consisting of one house or assembly that legislates and votes as one. Unicameralism makes up nearly 60% of all national legislatures and an even greater share of subnational legislatures.

Sometimes, as in New Zealand and Denmark, unicameralism comes from the abolition of one of two bicameral chambers, or, as in Sweden, through the merger of the two chambers into a single one, while in others a second chamber has never existed from the beginning.

== Rationale for unicameralism and criticism ==
The principal advantage of a unicameral system is more efficient lawmaking, as the legislative process is simpler and there is no possibility of deadlock between two chambers. Proponents of unicameralism have also argued that it reduces costs, even if the number of legislators stays the same, since there are fewer institutions to maintain and support financially. Popular among 20th-century democratic countries, unicameral, proportional legislatures were seen by nascent nations as both more democratic and effective. However, at the tail end of the 20th century, the trend in favour of unicameral legislatures over bicameral legislatures started to reverse, with a trend of countries starting to either restore or create Upper houses with the objectives of achieving greater checks and balances, representation, and/or legislative oversight, causing the number of bicameral parliaments to rise from some 45 countries at the beginning of the 1970s to more than 80 in 2024.

Proponents of bicameral legislatures say that having two legislative chambers offers an additional restraint on the majority, though critics note that there are other ways to restrain majorities, such as through non-partisan courts and a robust constitution.

== List of unicameral legislatures ==
Countries with a bicameral legislature Countries with a unicameral legislature Countries with a unicameral legislature and an advisory body Countries with no legislature

Approximately half of the world's sovereign states are currently unicameral. The People's Republic of China is somewhat in-between, with a legislature and a formal advisory body. China has a Chinese People's Political Consultative Conference which meets alongside the National People's Congress, in many respects an advisory "upper house".

Many subnational entities have unicameral legislatures. These include the state of Nebraska and territories of Guam and the Virgin Islands in the United States, the Chinese special administrative regions of Hong Kong and Macao, the Australian state of Queensland as well as the Northern Territory and the Australian Capital Territory, a majority of the provinces of Argentina, all of the provinces and territories in Canada, all of the Communities, Regions and Community Commissions of Belgium, all of the regions of Italy and France, all of the provinces of Nepal, all of the Spanish autonomous communities, both of the autonomous regions of Portugal, most of the states and union territories of India, and all of the states of Brazil, Mexico, Nigeria, Austria, and Germany. In the United Kingdom, the devolved Scottish Parliament, the Welsh Senedd, the Northern Ireland Assembly, and the London Assembly are also unicameral.

=== National (UN member states and observers) ===
==== Federal ====
Country	Unicameral body	Seats	Notes
Comoros	Assembly of the Union	33	
Germany	Bundestag	630	The Bundestag is technically the unicameral parliament of Germany, since the Basic Law (German constitution) defines the Bundesrat not as a chamber of the legislature, but as a completely separate legislative institution.
Iraq	Council of Representatives	329	A provision exists for the founding of a "Council of Union", but no move to this effect has been initiated by the existing Council
Micronesia	Congress	14	
Saint Kitts and Nevis	National Assembly	15	
United Arab Emirates	Federal National Council	40	
Venezuela	National Assembly	285	

==== Unitary ====
Country	Unicameral body	Seats	Notes
Afghanistan	Leadership Council	30	Purely advisory, powers reside in the Supreme Leader
Albania	Kuvendi	140	
Andorra	General Council of Andorra	28	
Angola	National Assembly	220	
Armenia	National Assembly	105	
Azerbaijan	National Assembly	125	
Bangladesh	Jatiya Sangsad	350	
Botswana	National Assembly	69	
Brunei	Legislative Council	34	Purely advisory, powers reside in the Sultan
Bulgaria	National Assembly	240	
Burkina Faso	National Assembly	127	
Cape Verde	National Assembly	72	
Central African Republic	National Assembly	140	
China	National People's Congress	2878	
Costa Rica	Legislative Assembly	57	
Croatia	Sabor	151	
Cuba	National Assembly of People's Power	470	
Cyprus	House of Representatives	56	
Denmark	Folketing	179	
Djibouti	National Assembly	65	
Dominica	House of Assembly	32	
East Timor	National Parliament	65	
Ecuador	National Assembly	151	
El Salvador	Legislative Assembly	60	
Eritrea	National Assembly	150	
Estonia	Riigikogu	101	
Fiji	Parliament	55	
Finland	Parliament	200	
Gambia	National Assembly	58	
Georgia	Parliament	150	
Ghana	Parliament	276	
Greece	Parliament	300	
Guatemala	Congress	160	
Guinea-Bissau	National People's Assembly	102	
Guyana	National Assembly	65	
Honduras	National Congress	128	
Hungary	National Assembly	199	
Iceland	Althing	63	
Iran	Islamic Consultative Assembly	290	
Israel	Knesset	120	
Kazakhstan	Kurultai	145	
Kiribati	House of Assembly	45	
North Korea	Supreme People's Assembly	687	
South Korea	National Assembly	300	
Kuwait	National Assembly	65	
Kyrgyzstan	Supreme Council	90	
Laos	National Assembly	175	
Latvia	Saeima	100	
Lebanon	Parliament	128	
Libya	House of Representatives	200	
Liechtenstein	Landtag	25	
Lithuania	Seimas	141	
Luxembourg	Chamber of Deputies	60	
Madagascar	National Assembly	163	Senate suspended due to 2025 coup
Malawi	National Assembly	229	
Maldives	Majlis	93	
Mali	National Assembly	147	
Malta	Parliament	79	
Marshall Islands	Legislature	33	
Mauritania	Parliament	176	
Mauritius	National Assembly	66	
Moldova	Parliament	101	
Monaco	National Council	24	
Mongolia	State Great Khural	126	
Montenegro	Parliament	81	
Mozambique	Assembly of the Republic	250	
Nauru	Parliament	19	
New Zealand	Parliament	123	
Nicaragua	National Assembly	90	
Niger	National Assembly	171	
North Macedonia	Assembly	120	
Norway	Storting	169	
Palestine	Legislative Council	132	
Panama	National Assembly	71	
Papua New Guinea	National Parliament	118	
Portugal	Assembly of the Republic	230	
Qatar	Consultative Assembly	45	
Saint Vincent and the Grenadines	House of Assembly	23	
Samoa	Legislative Assembly	51	
Saudi Arabia	Consultative Assembly	150	Purely advisory, powers reside in the King
San Marino	Grand and General Council	60	
São Tomé and Príncipe	National Assembly	55	
Senegal	National Assembly	165	
Serbia	National Assembly	250	
Seychelles	National Assembly	34	
Sierra Leone	Parliament	149	
Singapore	Parliament	108	
Slovakia	National Council	150	
Solomon Islands	National Parliament	50	
Sri Lanka	Parliament	225	
Suriname	National Assembly	51	
Sweden	Riksdag	349	
Syria	People's Assembly	210	
Tanzania	National Assembly	403	
Tonga	Legislative Assembly	26	
Turkey	Grand National Assembly	600	
Turkmenistan	Assembly	125	
Tuvalu	Parliament	16	
Uganda	Parliament	529	
Ukraine	Verkhovna Rada	450	
Vanuatu	Parliament	52	
Vatican City	Pontifical Commission	8	All powers delegated by the sovereign
Vietnam	National Assembly	500	
Zambia	National Assembly	280	

=== Territorial ===
Country	Unicameral body	Seats	Notes
Åland Islands	Parliament	30	
Anguilla	House of Assembly	13	
Aruba	Parliament	21	
Azores	Legislative Assembly	57	
Bougainville	House of Representatives	41	Autonomous region of Papua New Guinea
British Virgin Islands	House of Assembly	15	
Cayman Islands	Legislative Assembly	21	
Cherokee Nation	Tribal Council	17	Indian reservation of the United States
Choctaw Nation	Tribal Council	12	Indian reservation of the United States
Cook Islands	Parliament	24	
Curaçao	Parliament	21	
Falkland Islands	Legislative Assembly	11	
Faroe Islands	Løgting	33	
French Polynesia	Assembly	57	
Gibraltar	Parliament	17	
Greenland	Inatsisartut	31	Autonomous territory of the Kingdom of Denmark
Guam	Lehislaturan	15	Unincorporated territory of the United States
Guernsey	States	40	
Hong Kong	Legislative Council	90	
Jersey	States Assembly	54	
Madeira	Legislative Assembly	47	
Macao	Legislative Assembly	33	
Montserrat	Legislative Assembly	11	
Navajo Nation	Tribal Council	24	Indian reservation of the United States
New Caledonia	Congress	54	
Niue	Assembly	20	
Pitcairn Islands	Island Council	10	
Saint Barthélemy	Territorial Council	19	
Saint Helena	Legislative Council	15	
Saint Martin	Collectivity of Saint Martin	23	
Saint Pierre and Miquelon	Territorial Council	19	
Sint Maarten	Parliament	15	
Tobago	House of Assembly	15	
Tokelau	General Fono	20	
Turks and Caicos Islands	House of Assembly	21	
U.S. Virgin Islands	Legislature	15	
Wallis and Futuna	Territorial Assembly	20	

=== State parliaments with limited recognition ===
Country	Unicameral body	Seats	Notes
Abkhazia	People's Assembly	35	
Kosovo	Assembly	120	
Northern Cyprus	Assembly of the Republic	50	
Sahrawi Arab Democratic Republic	National Council	53	
South Ossetia	Parliament	34	
Taiwan	Legislative Yuan	113	The original constitution is partially superseded by the additional articles only on Taiwan which replaced the tricameral parliament into a unicameral one. A sunset clause in the additional articles will terminate them in the event of a hypothetical resumption of ROC rule in mainland China.
Transnistria	Supreme Council	33	

=== Subnational ===
==== Federations ====
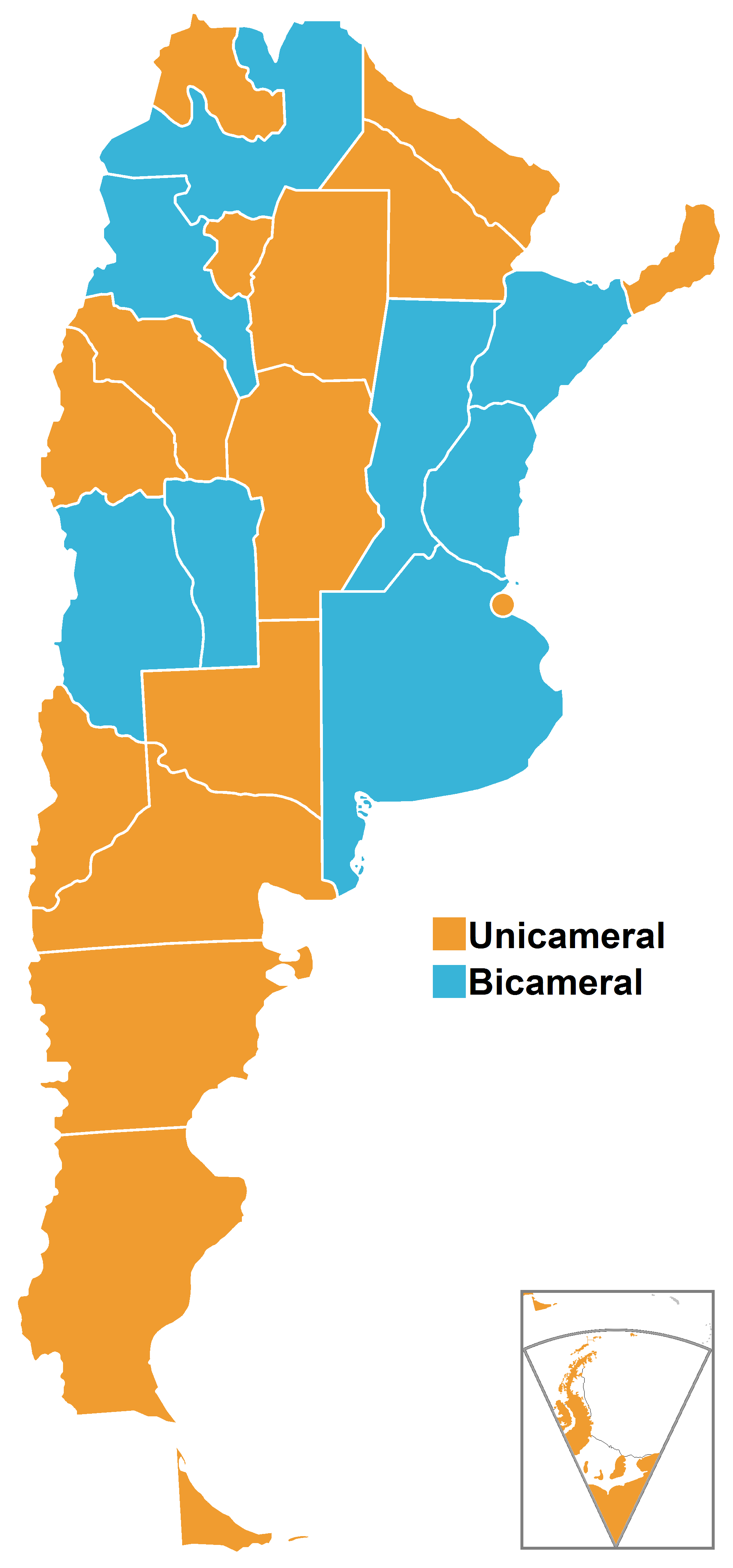
Provincial legislatures in Argentina

- All legislatures and legislative councils of the regions and communities of Belgium
- All legislative assemblies in all states of Brazil
- All legislative assemblies of the provinces and territories of Canada
- All Landtage of the states of Germany
- All legislative assemblies of the states of Malaysia
- All legislatures in all states of Mexico
- All legislatures of the provinces in Nepal
- All legislatures of the provinces and territories in Pakistan
- The legislature of the state of Nebraska, and council of the District of Columbia in the United States
- The tribal councils of the Five Civilized Tribes in the state of Oklahoma
- Parliament of Queensland and the legislative assemblies of the territories of Australia (but not the other states)
- Provincial legislatures of the provinces of South Africa
- Narodna skupština of Republika Srpska
- 15 of the 23 provinces of Argentina — Chaco, Chubut, Córdoba, Formosa, Jujuy, La Pampa, La Rioja, Misiones, Neuquén, Río Negro, San Juan, Santa Cruz, Santiago del Estero, Tierra del Fuego, Tucumán, and the autonomous city of Buenos Aires.
- 22 of the 28 states and union territories of India — Arunachal Pradesh, Assam, Chhattisgarh, Goa, Gujarat, Haryana, Himachal Pradesh, Jharkhand, Kerala, Madhya Pradesh, Manipur, Meghalaya, Mizoram, Nagaland, Odisha, Punjab, Rajasthan, Sikkim, Tamil Nadu, Tripura, Uttarakhand, and West Bengal; and 3 of the union territories — Delhi, Jammu and Kashmir, and Puducherry.

==== Devolved governments ====
- Regional councils of France
- Iraqi Kurdistan Parliament
- Regional councils of Italy
- Regional House of Representative councils of Indonesian provinces, regencies, and cities
- Bangsamoro Parliament in Philippines
- Parliaments (variously named Parlamento, Cortes, Junta) of the autonomous communities of Spain
- City and County Councils of the administrative divisions of Taiwan
- Councils of the oblasts of Ukraine
- Countries of the United Kingdom:
  - Northern Ireland Assembly
  - Scottish Parliament
  - Welsh Senedd

==== Others ====
- Local People's Congresses of all levels of provinces, regions, and municipalities of the People's Republic of China
- National Council of the Palestine Liberation Organization

== List of historical unicameral legislatures ==
=== National ===
- The First Protectorate Parliament and Second Protectorate Parliament of the Kingdom of England, regulated by the Instrument of Government (dissolved)
- Parliament of the Kingdom of Scotland until 1707 (dissolved)
- Congress of the Confederation was unicameral before being replaced in 1789 by the current, bicameral United States Congress.
- Provisional Congress of the Confederate States was unicameral before being replaced by the bicameral Confederate States Congress in 1862.
- Ministry of Dáil Éireann of the Irish Republic a revolutionary state between 1919 and 1922 was unicameral during the Irish War of Independence. Replaced by the bicameral Irish Free State government's Seanad (upper house) & Dail (lower house)
- Congress of Deputies of Second Spanish Republic was unicameral between 1931 and 1936. Dissolved at the end of Spanish Civil War
- Sejm of Poland under Soviet influence was unicameral between 1947 and 1989. The bicameral parliament was restored following the end of communist rule.
- The Parliament of Uzbekistan was unicameral before being replaced in 2005 by the current, bicameral Oliy Majlis.
- National Assembly of Cameroon was unicameral before being replaced in 2013 by the current, bicameral Parliament of Cameroon.
- Chamber of People's Representative of Equatorial Guinea was unicameral before being replaced in 2013 by the current, bicameral Parliament of Equatorial Guinea.
- National Assembly of Kenya was the country's unicameral legislature before becoming the lower house of the bicameral Parliament of Kenya in 2013.
- National Assembly of Ivory Coast was the country's unicameral legislature before becoming the lower house of the bicameral Parliament of Ivory Coast in 2016.
- Central National Committee and the Provisional People's Representative Council of Indonesia was the unicameral legislature of the Republic of Indonesia during the War of Independence and the liberal democracy era.
- The National Assembly of Togo
- The National Assembly of Chad
- The Assembly of the Representatives of the People of Tunisia
- The National Assembly of Benin
- The Congress of the Republic of Peru from 1995 to 2026

=== Subnational ===
- General Assembly of Georgia until 1789
- General Assembly of Pennsylvania until 1790
- General Assembly of Vermont until 1836

=== Other ===
- Assembly of Representatives of Yishuv community in Mandatory Palestine from 1920 to 1949

== Unicameralism in the Philippines ==
Though the current Congress of the Philippines is bicameral, the country experienced unicameralism in 1898 and 1899 (during the First Philippine Republic), from 1935 to 1941 (the Commonwealth era) and from 1943 to 1944 (during the Japanese occupation). Under the 1973 Constitution, the legislative body was called Batasang Pambansa, which functioned also a unicameral legislature within a parliamentary system (1973–1981) and a semi-presidential system (1981–1986) form of government.

The ongoing process of amending or revising the current Constitution and form of government is popularly known as Charter Change. A shift to a unicameral parliament was included in the proposals of the constitutional commission created by President Gloria Macapagal Arroyo. Unlike in the United States, senators in the Senate of the Philippines are elected not per district and state but nationally; the Philippines is a unitary state. The Philippine government's decision-making process, relative to the United States, is more rigid, highly centralised, much slower and susceptible to political gridlock. As a result, the trend for unicameralism as well as other political system reforms are more contentious in the Philippines.

While Congress is bicameral, all local legislatures are unicameral: the Bangsamoro Parliament, the Sangguniang Panlalawigan (Provincial Boards), Sangguniang Panlungsod (City Councils), Sangguniang Bayan (Municipal Councils), Sangguniang Barangay (Barangay Councils), and the Sangguniang Kabataan (Youth Councils).

== Unicameralism in the United States ==
Local government legislatures of counties, cities, or other political subdivisions within states are usually unicameral. Three U.S. states and territories have a unicameral legislature: the state of Nebraska, and the territories of Guam and the Virgin Islands.

The Nebraska Legislature (also called the Unicameral) is the supreme legislative body of the state of Nebraska and the only unicameral state legislature in the United States. Its members are called "senators", as it was originally the upper house of a bicameral legislature before the Nebraska House of Representatives dissolved in 1937. The legislature is also notable for being nonpartisan and officially recognizes no party affiliation, making Nebraska unique among US states. With 49 members, it is also the smallest legislature of any US state.

=== Early history ===
The history of unicameralism in the United States began with the American Revolution: The provisional government of the early United States was unicameral from 1775–1788.

Three revolutionary states had unicameral legislatures: Georgia (1777–1789), Pennsylvania (1776–1790), and Vermont (1776–1836). These constitutions introduced a strong unicameral legislature and weak governor with no veto power. In Pennsylvania, the 1776 Constitution was based substantially on Thomas Paine's Common Sense. In 1790, moderates gained power in the Pennsyvlania state legislature, called a new constitutional convention, and rewrote the constitution with a strong executive with veto power and created a new upper house. Thomas Paine strongly opposed the new Constitution, calling it "a departure from the principles" of representative government and a mere "copy in miniature of the government of England".

Since the creation of the United States Senate at the Constitutional Convention of 1787 under the Connecticut Compromise, reformers have proposed reforms to the United States Senate or its outright abolition, which would make the United States federal government a unicameral entity.

=== Later proposals ===
In 1944, Missouri held a vote on changing the General Assembly to a unicameral one, which was narrowly rejected by the voters 52.42–47.58. Only the city of St. Louis and the St. Louis County voted in favor, whilst Jackson County (containing the bulk of Kansas City) narrowly voted against, and all other counties voted against the change to unicameralism.

In 1970, North Dakota voters voted to call a constitutional convention. In 1972, a change to a unicameral legislature was approved by 69.36–30.64; however, since the voters rejected the new constitution at the same referendum, it never took effect.

In 1999, Governor Jesse Ventura proposed converting the Minnesota Legislature into a single chamber. Although debated, the idea was never adopted.

In 2005, the US territory of Puerto Rico held a non-binding unicameralism referendum. Voters approved changing its Legislative Assembly to a unicameral body by 456,267 votes in favor (83.7%) versus 88,720 against (16.3%). If both the territory's House of Representatives and Senate had approved by a 2/3 vote the specific amendments to the Puerto Rico Constitution that are required for the change to a unicameral legislature, another referendum would have been held in the territory to approve such amendments. If those constitutional changes had been approved, Puerto Rico could have switched to a unicameral legislature as early as 2015.

On June 9, 2009, the Maine House of Representatives voted to form a unicameral legislature, but the measure did not pass the Senate.

During the 2009 New York State Senate leadership crisis, which yielded legislative gridlock, former Congressman Rick Lazio, a prospective candidate for governor, proposed that New York adopt unicameralism.

A 2018 study found that efforts to adopt unicameralism in Ohio and Missouri failed due to rural opposition. There was a fear in rural communities that unicameralism would diminish their influence in state government.

== See also ==
- Bicameralism – Legislature with two chambers
- Tricameralism – Government practice of having three legislative chambers
