= 2005 Mexican elections =

Local elections in Mexico

A number of local elections took place in Mexico during 2005:

== 6 February 2005 ==
=== Baja California Sur ===
- Governor, five mayors, and 21 (15+6) local deputies
- See: 2005 Baja California Sur state election

=== Guerrero ===
- Governor, mayors, and local congress
- See: 2005 Guerrero state election

=== Quintana Roo ===
- Governor, eight mayors, and 25 (15+10) local deputies
- See: 2005 Quintana Roo state election

== 20 February 2005 ==
=== Hidalgo ===
- Governor, mayors, and local congress
- See: 2005 Hidalgo state election

== 10 April 2005 ==
=== Colima ===
- Governor (extraordinary election)
- See: 2005 Colima state election

== 3 July 2005 ==
=== Nayarit ===
- Governor, mayors, and local congress
- See: 2005 Nayarit state election

=== Estado de México ===
- Governor
- See: 2005 México state election

== 25 September 2005 ==
=== Coahuila ===
- Governor, mayors, local congress
- See: 2005 Coahuila state election
