= 2005 Hino mayoral election =

Hino, Tokyo held a mayoral election on April 17, 2005. Incumbent mayor Baba Hiromichi won the election.

== Candidates ==
- Baba Hiromichi, incumbent Independent mayor supported by the Liberal Democratic Party, Democratic Party of Japan, New Komeito Party and the Social Democratic Party.
- Kubota Hiromichi, Independent candidate supported by the Japanese Communist Party. Works as a lawyer.

== Results ==
Mayoral election 2005: Hino City
Party	Candidate	Votes	%	±%
Independent, LDP, DPJ, Komeito, SDP	Baba Hiromichi	33,181		
Independent, JCP	Kubota Hiromichi	24,718		
Turnout		58,610	43.15 %	
