= List of United Kingdom Parliament constituencies (2005–2010) =

This is a list of the 646 previous constituencies of the United Kingdom parliament.

There are 650 in the 2010 election constituencies currently represented in the House of Commons of the Parliament of the United Kingdom, as at the 2005 general election. Each constituency is represented by a single Member of Parliament (MP).

Constituency boundaries are subject to regular review by the four independent Boundary Commissions, usually once every 10 to 15 years, to keep the electorate of each constituency as close to the national average as is reasonably possible. New constituencies may be created, or existing ones abolished, by these reviews.

Constituencies were long based on boroughs (burghs in Scotland) and counties. Today, constituencies in England are mostly subdivisions of local authorities, with each constituency comprising a number of whole wards. In Scotland, constituencies are subdivisions of council areas, and in Wales they are subdivisions of the preserved counties. Northern Ireland is reviewed as a whole, and constituency boundaries may cross all district borders.

In some cases, particularly in urban areas, two or more local government areas may be combined to form a single review area, so that particularly large or small constituencies are not created. For example, if two adjacent areas are entitled to 1.5 constituencies each, they may be combined and awarded three constituencies, rather than having two constituencies each, all of which would be well below the average constituency electorate.

The average constituency size is approximately 74,000 registered voters, but they vary in size from the smallest (Na h-Eileanan an Iar at 22,200 voters) to the largest (the Isle of Wight at approximately 110,000 voters). A constituency has no physical size restrictions.

The Parliament of 2001 contained representatives from 659 constituencies. Most of the current constituency boundaries were last reviewed in the early 1990s, and are therefore based on administrative boundaries prior to the last series of local government boundary changes. However, a Boundary Commission for Scotland review in February 2005 resulted in the reorganisation of most Scottish constituencies to adjust for the historic over-representation of Scotland. This reduced the number of constituencies in Scotland by 13, from 72 down to the current 59. The Parliament of 2005 therefore had 646 representatives. In the 2010 Election on 6 May 2010 the number of seats contested has increased from 646 to 650 as a result of boundary changes. Technically an absolute majority would require one party to win 326 seats, or else there would be a hung parliament.

Contents
1 England
1.1 East Midlands	Derbyshire, Leicestershire, Lincolnshire, Northamptonshire, Nottinghamshire
1.2 East of England	Bedfordshire, Cambridgeshire, Essex, Hertfordshire, Norfolk, Suffolk
1.3 Greater London	North East, North West, South East, South West
1.4 North East England	Cleveland, Durham, Northumberland, Tyne and Wear
1.5 North West England	Cheshire, Cumbria, Greater Manchester, Lancashire, Merseyside
1.6 South East England	Berkshire, Buckinghamshire, East Sussex, Hampshire, Isle of Wight, Kent, Oxfordshire, Surrey, West Sussex
1.7 South West England	Avon, Cornwall, Devon, Dorset, Gloucestershire, Somerset, Wiltshire
1.8 West Midlands	Hereford and Worcester, Shropshire, Staffordshire, Warwickshire, West Midlands
1.9 Yorkshire and the Humber	Humberside, North Yorkshire, South Yorkshire, West Yorkshire
2 Northern Ireland
3 Scotland
4 Wales

== England ==
=== East Midlands ===
==== Derbyshire ====
- Amber Valley
- Bolsover
- Chesterfield
- Derby North
- Derby South
- Erewash
- High Peak
- North East Derbyshire
- South Derbyshire
- West Derbyshire

==== Leicestershire ====
- Blaby
- Bosworth
- Charnwood
- Harborough
- Leicester East
- Leicester South
- Leicester West
- Loughborough
- North West Leicestershire
- Rutland and Melton

==== Lincolnshire ====
- Boston and Skegness
- Gainsborough
- Grantham and Stamford
- Lincoln
- Louth and Horncastle
- Sleaford and North Hykeham
- South Holland and The Deepings

==== Northamptonshire ====
- Corby
- Daventry
- Kettering
- Northampton North
- Northampton South
- Wellingborough

==== Nottinghamshire ====
- Ashfield
- Bassetlaw
- Broxtowe
- Gedling
- Mansfield
- Newark
- Nottingham East
- Nottingham North
- Nottingham South
- Rushcliffe
- Sherwood

=== East of England ===
==== Bedfordshire ====
- Bedford
- Luton North
- Luton South
- Mid Bedfordshire
- North East Bedfordshire
- South West Bedfordshire

==== Cambridgeshire ====
- Cambridge
- Huntingdon
- North East Cambridgeshire
- North West Cambridgeshire
- Peterborough
- South Cambridgeshire
- South East Cambridgeshire

==== Essex ====
- Basildon
- Billericay
- Braintree
- Brentwood and Ongar
- Castle Point
- Colchester
- Epping Forest
- Harlow
- Harwich
- Maldon and East Chelmsford
- North Essex
- Rayleigh
- Rochford and Southend East
- Saffron Walden
- Southend West
- Thurrock
- West Chelmsford

==== Hertfordshire ====
- Broxbourne
- Hemel Hempstead
- Hertford and Stortford
- Hertsmere
- Hitchin and Harpenden
- North East Hertfordshire
- St Albans
- South West Hertfordshire
- Stevenage
- Watford
- Welwyn Hatfield

==== Norfolk ====
- Great Yarmouth
- Mid Norfolk
- North Norfolk
- North West Norfolk
- Norwich North
- Norwich South
- South Norfolk
- South West Norfolk

==== Suffolk ====
- Bury St Edmunds
- Central Suffolk and North Ipswich
- Ipswich
- South Suffolk
- Suffolk Coastal
- Waveney
- West Suffolk

=== Greater London ===
==== North East London Boroughs ====
- Barking
- Bethnal Green and Bow
- Chingford and Woodford Green
- Dagenham
- East Ham
- Edmonton
- Enfield North
- Enfield Southgate
- Hackney North and Stoke Newington
- Hackney South and Shoreditch
- Hornchurch
- Hornsey and Wood Green
- Ilford North
- Ilford South
- Islington North
- Islington South and Finsbury
- Leyton and Wanstead
- Poplar and Canning Town
- Romford
- Tottenham
- Upminster
- Walthamstow
- West Ham

==== North West London Boroughs ====
- Brent East
- Brent North
- Brent South
- Chipping Barnet
- Cities of London and Westminster
- Ealing, Acton and Shepherd's Bush
- Ealing North
- Ealing Southall
- Finchley and Golders Green
- Hammersmith and Fulham
- Hampstead and Highgate
- Harrow East
- Harrow West
- Hayes and Harlington
- Hendon
- Holborn and St. Pancras
- Kensington and Chelsea
- Regent's Park and Kensington North
- Ruislip-Northwood
- Uxbridge

==== South East London Boroughs ====
- Beckenham
- Bexleyheath and Crayford
- Bromley and Chislehurst
- Camberwell and Peckham
- Croydon Central
- Croydon North
- Croydon South
- Dulwich and West Norwood
- Eltham
- Erith and Thamesmead
- Greenwich and Woolwich
- Lewisham Deptford
- Lewisham East
- Lewisham West
- North Southwark and Bermondsey
- Old Bexley and Sidcup

==== South West London Boroughs ====
- Battersea
- Brentford and Isleworth
- Carshalton and Wallington
- Feltham and Heston
- Kingston and Surbiton
- Mitcham and Morden
- Putney
- Richmond Park
- Streatham
- Sutton and Cheam
- Tooting
- Twickenham
- Vauxhall
- Wimbledon
- Wandsworth

=== North East England ===
==== Cleveland ====
- Hartlepool
- Middlesbrough
- Middlesbrough South and East Cleveland
- Redcar
- Stockton North
- Stockton South

==== Durham ====
- Bishop Auckland
- City of Durham
- Darlington
- Easington
- North Durham
- North West Durham
- Sedgefield

==== Northumberland ====
- Berwick-upon-Tweed
- Blyth Valley
- Hexham
- Wansbeck

==== Tyne and Wear ====
- Blaydon
- Gateshead East and Washington West
- Houghton and Washington East
- Jarrow
- Newcastle upon Tyne Central
- Newcastle upon Tyne East and Wallsend
- Newcastle upon Tyne North
- North Tyneside
- South Shields
- Sunderland North
- Sunderland South
- Tyne Bridge
- Tynemouth

=== North West England ===
==== Cheshire ====
- City of Chester
- Congleton
- Crewe and Nantwich
- Eddisbury
- Ellesmere Port and Neston
- Halton
- Macclesfield
- Tatton
- Warrington North
- Warrington South
- Weaver Vale

==== Cumbria ====
- Barrow and Furness
- Carlisle
- Copeland
- Penrith and The Border
- Westmorland and Lonsdale
- Workington

==== Greater Manchester ====
- Altrincham and Sale West
- Ashton-under-Lyne
- Bolton North East
- Bolton South East
- Bolton West
- Bury North
- Bury South
- Cheadle
- Denton and Reddish
- Eccles
- Hazel Grove
- Heywood and Middleton
- Leigh
- Makerfield
- Manchester Blackley
- Manchester Central
- Manchester Gorton
- Manchester Withington
- Oldham East and Saddleworth
- Oldham West and Royton
- Rochdale
- Salford
- Stalybridge and Hyde
- Stockport
- Stretford and Urmston
- Wigan
- Worsley
- Wythenshawe and Sale East

==== Lancashire ====
- Blackburn
- Blackpool North and Fleetwood
- Blackpool South
- Burnley
- Chorley
- Fylde
- Hyndburn
- Lancaster and Wyre
- Morecambe and Lunesdale
- Pendle
- Preston
- Ribble Valley
- Rossendale and Darwen
- South Ribble
- West Lancashire

==== Merseyside ====
- Birkenhead
- Bootle
- Crosby
- Knowsley North and Sefton East
- Knowsley South
- Liverpool Garston
- Liverpool Riverside
- Liverpool Walton
- Liverpool Wavertree
- Liverpool West Derby
- St Helens North
- St Helens South
- Southport
- Wallasey
- Wirral South
- Wirral West

=== South East England ===
==== Berkshire ====
- Bracknell
- Maidenhead
- Newbury
- Reading East
- Reading West
- Slough
- Windsor
- Wokingham

==== Buckinghamshire ====
- Aylesbury
- Beaconsfield
- Buckingham
- Chesham and Amersham
- Milton Keynes South West
- North East Milton Keynes
- Wycombe

==== East Sussex ====
- Bexhill and Battle
- Brighton Kemptown
- Brighton Pavilion
- Eastbourne
- Hastings and Rye
- Hove
- Lewes
- Wealden

==== Hampshire ====
- Aldershot
- Basingstoke
- East Hampshire
- Eastleigh
- Fareham
- Gosport
- Havant
- New Forest East
- New Forest West
- North East Hampshire
- North West Hampshire
- Portsmouth North
- Portsmouth South
- Romsey
- Southampton Itchen
- Southampton Test
- Winchester

==== Isle of Wight ====
- Isle of Wight

==== Kent ====
- Ashford
- Canterbury
- Chatham and Aylesford
- Dartford
- Dover
- Faversham and Mid Kent
- Folkestone and Hythe
- Gillingham
- Gravesham
- Maidstone and The Weald
- Medway
- North Thanet
- Orpington
- Sevenoaks
- Sittingbourne and Sheppey
- South Thanet
- Tonbridge and Malling
- Tunbridge Wells

==== Oxfordshire ====
- Banbury
- Henley
- Oxford East
- Oxford West and Abingdon
- Wantage
- Witney

==== Surrey ====
- East Surrey
- Epsom and Ewell
- Esher and Walton
- Guildford
- Mole Valley
- Reigate
- Runnymede and Weybridge
- South West Surrey
- Spelthorne
- Surrey Heath
- Woking

==== West Sussex ====
- Arundel and South Downs
- Bognor Regis and Littlehampton
- Chichester
- Crawley
- East Worthing and Shoreham
- Horsham
- Mid Sussex
- Worthing West

=== South West England ===
==== Avon ====
- Bath
- Bristol East
- Bristol North West
- Bristol South
- Bristol West
- Kingswood
- Northavon
- Wansdyke
- Weston-Super-Mare
- Woodspring

==== Cornwall ====
- Falmouth and Camborne
- North Cornwall
- St Ives
- South East Cornwall
- Truro and St Austell

==== Devon ====
- East Devon
- Exeter
- North Devon
- Plymouth Devonport
- Plymouth Sutton
- South West Devon
- Teignbridge
- Tiverton and Honiton
- Torbay
- Torridge and West Devon
- Totnes

==== Dorset ====
- Bournemouth East
- Bournemouth West
- Christchurch
- Mid Dorset and North Poole
- North Dorset
- Poole
- South Dorset
- West Dorset

==== Gloucestershire ====
- Cheltenham
- Cotswold
- Forest of Dean
- Gloucester
- Stroud
- Tewkesbury

==== Somerset ====
- Bridgwater
- Somerton and Frome
- Taunton
- Wells
- Yeovil

==== Wiltshire ====
- Devizes
- North Swindon
- North Wiltshire
- Salisbury
- South Swindon
- Westbury

=== West Midlands ===
==== Hereford and Worcester ====
- Bromsgrove
- Hereford
- Leominster
- Mid Worcestershire
- Redditch
- West Worcestershire
- Worcester
- Wyre Forest

==== Shropshire ====
- Ludlow
- North Shropshire
- Shrewsbury and Atcham
- Telford
- The Wrekin

==== Staffordshire ====
- Burton
- Cannock Chase
- Lichfield
- Newcastle-under-Lyme
- South Staffordshire
- Stafford
- Staffordshire Moorlands
- Stoke-on-Trent Central
- Stoke-on-Trent North
- Stoke-on-Trent South
- Stone
- Tamworth

==== Warwickshire ====
- North Warwickshire
- Nuneaton
- Rugby and Kenilworth
- Stratford-on-Avon
- Warwick and Leamington

==== West Midlands (county) ====
- Aldridge-Brownhills
- Birmingham Edgbaston
- Birmingham Erdington
- Birmingham Hall Green
- Birmingham Hodge Hill
- Birmingham Ladywood
- Birmingham Northfield
- Birmingham Perry Barr
- Birmingham Selly Oak
- Birmingham Sparkbrook and Small Heath
- Birmingham Yardley
- Coventry North East
- Coventry North West
- Coventry South
- Dudley North
- Dudley South
- Halesowen and Rowley Regis
- Meriden
- Solihull
- Stourbridge
- Sutton Coldfield
- Walsall North
- Walsall South
- Warley
- West Bromwich East
- West Bromwich West
- Wolverhampton North East
- Wolverhampton South East
- Wolverhampton South West

=== Yorkshire and the Humber ===
==== Humberside ====
- Beverley and Holderness
- Brigg and Goole
- Cleethorpes
- East Yorkshire
- Great Grimsby
- Haltemprice and Howden
- Kingston upon Hull East
- Kingston upon Hull North
- Kingston upon Hull West and Hessle
- Scunthorpe

==== North Yorkshire ====
- City of York
- Harrogate and Knaresborough
- Richmond (Yorks)
- Ryedale
- Scarborough and Whitby
- Selby
- Skipton and Ripon
- Vale of York

==== South Yorkshire ====
- Barnsley Central
- Barnsley East and Mexborough
- Barnsley West and Penistone
- Don Valley
- Doncaster Central
- Doncaster North
- Rother Valley
- Rotherham
- Sheffield Attercliffe
- Sheffield Brightside
- Sheffield Central
- Sheffield Hallam
- Sheffield Heeley
- Sheffield Hillsborough
- Wentworth

==== West Yorkshire ====
- Batley and Spen
- Bradford North
- Bradford South
- Bradford West
- Calder Valley
- Colne Valley
- Dewsbury
- Elmet
- Halifax
- Hemsworth
- Huddersfield
- Keighley
- Leeds Central
- Leeds East
- Leeds North East
- Leeds North West
- Leeds West
- Morley and Rothwell
- Normanton
- Pontefract and Castleford
- Pudsey
- Shipley
- Wakefield

== Northern Ireland ==
- Belfast East
- Belfast North
- Belfast South
- Belfast West
- East Antrim
- East Londonderry
- Fermanagh & South Tyrone
- Foyle
- Lagan Valley
- Mid Ulster
- Newry & Armagh
- North Antrim
- North Down
- South Antrim
- South Down
- Strangford
- Upper Bann
- West Tyrone

== Scotland ==
The Fifth Periodical Review of the Boundary Commission for Scotland related the boundaries of new constituencies to those of Scottish local government council areas and to local government wards. Apart from a few minor adjustments, the council area boundaries dated from 1996 and the ward boundaries dated from 1999. Some council areas were grouped to form larger areas and, within these larger areas, some constituencies straddle council area boundaries.

=== Dumfries and Galloway, Scottish Borders ===
- Dumfries and Galloway
- Dumfriesshire, Clydesdale and Tweeddale
- Berwickshire, Roxburgh and Selkirk

=== South Ayrshire, East Ayrshire, North Ayrshire ===
- Central Ayrshire
- Ayr, Carrick and Cumnock
- Kilmarnock and Loudoun
- North Ayrshire and Arran

=== North Lanarkshire, South Lanarkshire ===
- East Kilbride, Strathaven and Lesmahagow
- Lanark and Hamilton East
- Rutherglen and Hamilton West
- Coatbridge, Chryston and Bellshill
- Cumbernauld, Kilsyth and Kirkintilloch East
- Airdrie and Shotts
- Motherwell and Wishaw

=== East Lothian, Midlothian ===
- East Lothian
- Midlothian

=== City of Edinburgh ===
- Edinburgh East
- Edinburgh North and Leith
- Edinburgh South
- Edinburgh South West
- Edinburgh West

=== West Lothian, Falkirk ===
- Linlithgow and East Falkirk
- Livingston
- Falkirk

=== West Dunbartonshire, East Dunbartonshire ===
- West Dunbartonshire
- East Dunbartonshire

=== Renfrewshire, East Renfrewshire, Inverclyde ===
- Paisley and Renfrewshire North
- Paisley and Renfrewshire South
- East Renfrewshire
- Inverclyde

=== Glasgow City ===
- Glasgow Central
- Glasgow East
- Glasgow North
- Glasgow North East
- Glasgow North West
- Glasgow South
- Glasgow South West

=== Stirling, Clackmannanshire, Perth and Kinross ===
- Ochil and South Perthshire
- Perth and North Perthshire
- Stirling

=== Fife ===
- Glenrothes
- Kirkcaldy and Cowdenbeath
- Dunfermline and West Fife
- North East Fife

=== Angus, Dundee City ===
- Dundee East
- Dundee West
- Angus

=== Aberdeenshire, Aberdeen City ===
- Gordon
- West Aberdeenshire and Kincardine
- Banff and Buchan
- Aberdeen North
- Aberdeen South

=== Moray, Argyll and Bute, Highland ===
- Argyll and Bute
- Moray
- Caithness, Sutherland and Easter Ross
- Inverness, Nairn, Badenoch and Strathspey
- Ross, Skye and Lochaber

=== Outer Hebrides, Orkney, Shetland ===
- Na h-Eileanan an Iar
- Orkney and Shetland

== Wales ==
- Aberavon
- Aberconwy
- Arfon
- Alyn and Deeside
- Blaenau Gwent
- Brecon and Radnorshire
- Bridgend
- Caerphilly
- Cardiff Central
- Cardiff North
- Cardiff South and Penarth
- Cardiff West
- Carmarthen East and Dinefwr
- Carmarthen West and South Pembrokeshire
- Ceredigion
- Clwyd South
- Clwyd West
- Cynon Valley
- Delyn
- Dwyfor Meirionnydd
- Gower
- Islwyn
- Llanelli
- Merthyr Tydfil and Rhymney
- Monmouth
- Montgomeryshire
- Neath
- Newport East
- Newport West
- Ogmore
- Pontypridd
- Preseli Pembrokeshire
- Rhondda
- Swansea East
- Swansea West
- Torfaen
- Vale of Clwyd
- Vale of Glamorgan
- Wrexham
- Ynys Môn (formerly Anglesey)

== See also ==
- For constituencies prior to 1997 List of former United Kingdom Parliament constituencies
- For constituencies following the 2024 general election List of United Kingdom Parliament constituencies (2024–present) by region
