= 2005 United Kingdom general election in Scotland =

- 5 May 2005

All 59 Scottish seats to the House of Commons
- Turnout: 60.6% (▲2.4 pp)
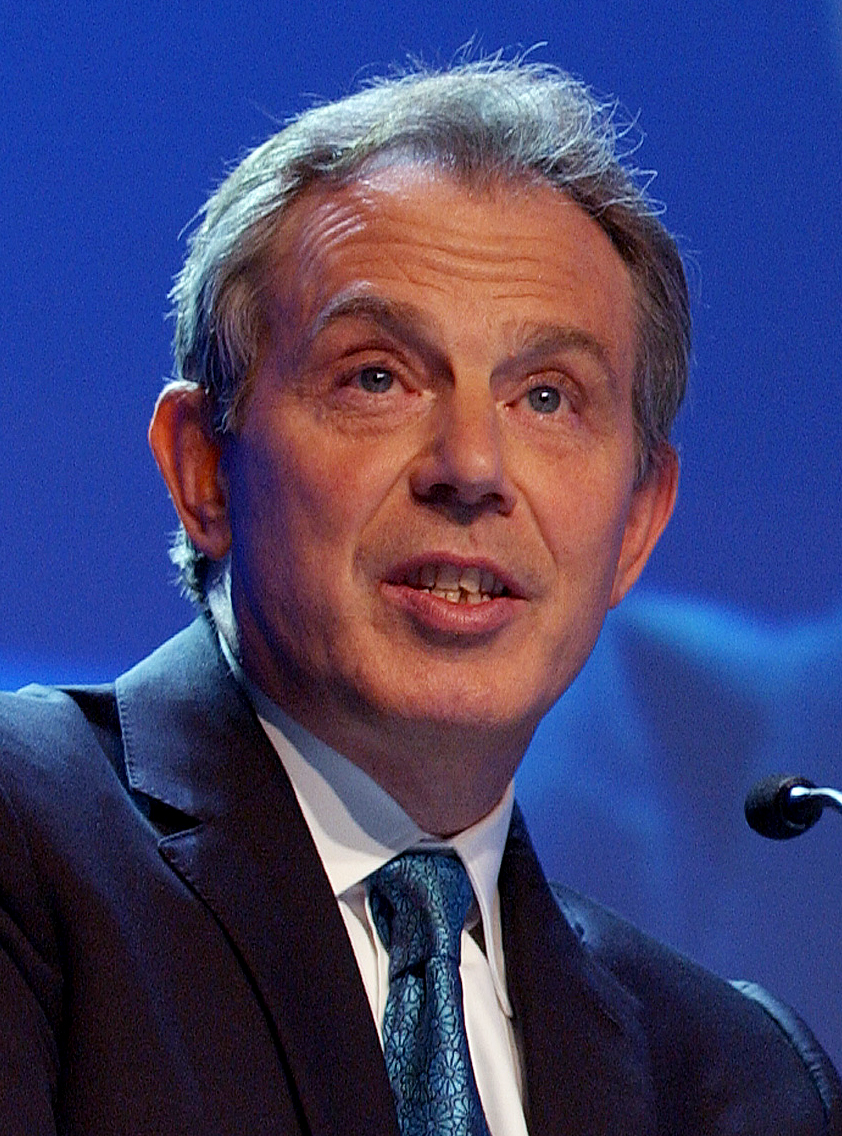

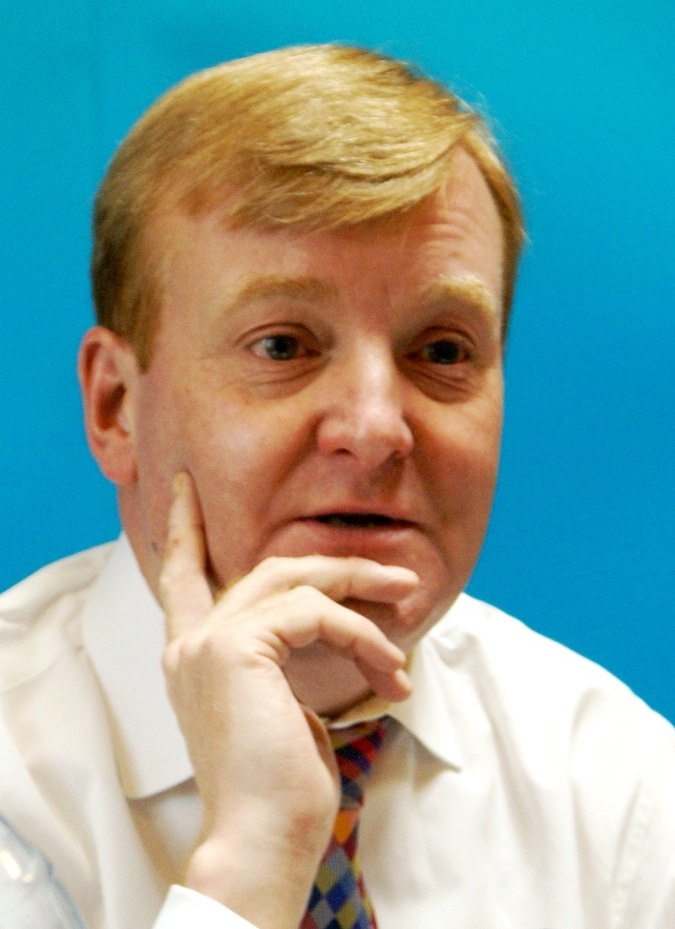

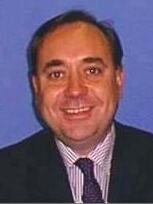

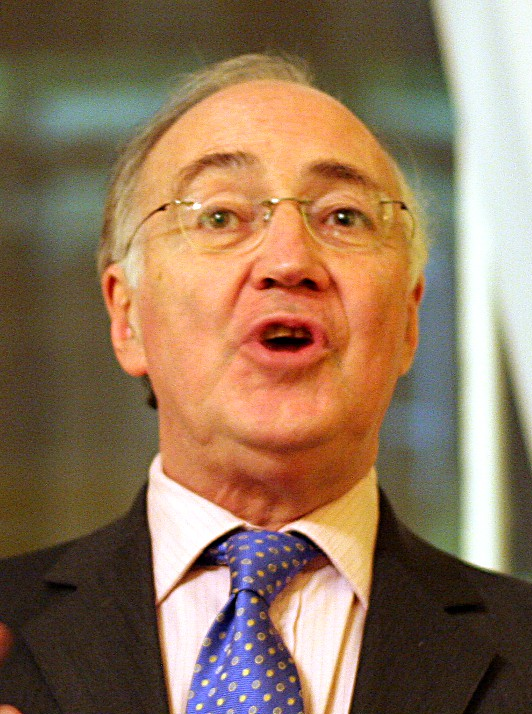
	First party	Second party
Leader	Tony Blair	Charles Kennedy
Party	Labour	Liberal Democrats
Leader since	21 July 1994	19 August 1999
Leader's seat	Sedgefield	Ross, Skye & Inverness West
Last election	55 seats, 43.9%	10 seats, 16.4%
Seats before	45	9
Seats won	40	11
Seat change	▼5*	▲2*
Popular vote	907,249	528,076
Percentage	38.9%	22.6%
Swing	▼4.4 pp	▲6.3 pp
UK seats	355	62
	Third party	Fourth party
Leader	Alex Salmond	Michael Howard
Party	SNP	Conservative
Leader since	3 September 2004	6 November 2003
Leader's seat	Banff and Buchan	Folkestone and Hythe
Last election	5 seats, 20.1%	1 seat, 15.6%
Seats before	4	0
Seats won	6	1
Seat change	▲2*	▲1*
Popular vote	412,267	369,388
Percentage	17.7%	15.8%
Swing	▼2.4 pp	▲0.2 pp
UK seats	6	198
- Coloured according to the winning party's vote share in each constituency *Indicates boundary change – so this is a nominal figure

On Thursday 5 May 2005 , the 2005 United Kingdom general election was held in Scotland, to elect all 646 members of the House of Commons, with 59 constituencies being in Scotland.

This was the first election to occur under the new boundaries which reduced the number of Scottish seats from 72 to 59. Previously, Scotland had a greater number of MPs per person than the rest of the UK to compensate for its distinct political nature and distance from Westminster. With the introduction of the Scottish Parliament, Scottish constituencies were brought into line with those found in the rest of the UK, so that they had similar electorates.

== Boundary Changes ==
Several years after the Scottish Parliament had been established by the Scotland Act 1998, the target electorate (population) size of Westminster Parliamentary seats in Scotland was adjusted to bring it in line with England's constituencies. Before this reform, Scotland had a smaller target electoral size per constituency resulting in more seats per head of population, which had been intended to compensate Scotland for its status as a nation, its lower population density (which causes larger constituencies geographically), its distance from the Parliament in Westminster and finally, because prior to 1999 Scottish law had been wholly determined by the UK Parliament in Westminster. These problems were perceived to have been addressed with the establishment of the devolved Scottish Parliament in May 1999.

The Boundary Commission for Scotland therefore produced a plan in 2003 in which there would be 59 constituencies, reduced from 72. In 2004, Parliament passed the Scottish Parliament (Constituencies) Act 2004 which instituted these changes and broke the link between UK and Scottish Parliamentary constituencies.

Three constituencies were left unchanged; the island seats of Orkney and Shetland, the Western Isles, though the latter changed its official name to the Gaelic "Na h-Eileanan an Iar", and Eastwood, which changed its name to "East Renfrewshire". Several other new constituency names were also implemented; in all these cases the new seats had altered boundaries.

The notional results of the 2001 election, based on the new boundaries

== Candidates ==
Below is a table summarising the candidates of the 2005 general election in Scotland.

Affiliation	Candidates
Scottish National Party	59
Labour Party	58
Conservative and Unionist Party	58
Liberal Democrats	58
Scottish Socialist Party	58
UK Independence Party	22
Scottish Green Party	19
Independent	12
Christian Party	10
Free Scotland Party	3
British National Party	2
Scottish Senior Citizens Unity Party	2
Speaker of the House of Commons	1
Scottish Unionist Party	1
Liberal Party	1
Pensioners Party Scotland	1
Publican Party — Free to Smoke	1
Pride in Paisley Party	1
Independent Green Voice	1
Scottish Independence Party	1
Legalise Cannabis Alliance	1
Death, Dungeons & Taxes	1
Communist Party of Britain	1
Total	382

== Predictions ==
Although it was impossible to guarantee a wholly accurate prediction of the strength of the parties within the 59 Scottish seats, estimates had been made prior to the poll on 5 May on the basis of a ward-by-ward breakdown of local council election results. An agreed set used by all media reports and most political commentators suggested that had the new boundaries been in effect for the 2001 general election, Labour would have won forty-six seats, the Liberal Democrats nine, the Scottish National Party four, and the Conservatives none. This would have represented a loss of ten seats for Labour and one each for the Liberal Democrats, Scottish National Party and the Conservatives. The arithmetic was however complicated by the fact that the boundary revision had produced some seats that were notionally highly marginal.

The results of the 2005 general election showed some of the highest changes of the share of the vote for particular parties occurring in Scottish seats, leading some commentators to speculate that either the notional results were in error and/or they were unable to take into account factors such as tactical voting and people voting differently between general and local elections.

== Analysis ==
Labour won 41 seats, the Liberal Democrats won 11 seats, the Scottish National Party won 6 seats, and in Dumfriesshire, Clydesdale and Tweeddale the Conservatives won their only Scottish seat. Compared to the previous general election results of 2001, this meant a loss of fourteen seats for Labour, a gain of one seat for the Scottish National Party and the Liberal Democrats, and no change for the Conservatives.

Results in Scotland for Labour were also down, though less so than in England. Labour lost approximately 4% of the vote in East Scotland and approximately 6% of the vote in West Scotland. Labour's vote declined the most in the Edinburgh area and in the north of Scotland (where Labour lost all of its rural seats).

The Conservative vote declined marginally in both East and West Scotland, but the Conservatives nevertheless did win a seat in the South (Dumfriesshire, Clydesdale and Tweeddale), so maintaining their sole Scottish seat in the House of Commons. Having once been the largest party in Scotland (most recently in 1959), the 2001 and 2005 general elections had done very little to reverse the downward trend that culminated in the loss of all Conservative representation in Scotland in 1997.

The Liberal Democrats made gains against Labour in both regions of Scotland and picked up a modest number of seats. On average, their vote rose approximately 5% across Scotland, though again this translated into few gains as the Liberal Democrat vote was not particularly concentrated.

The SNP's vote declined slightly across Scotland, but they won one rural and one urban seat from Labour.

The Socialist Labour Party achieved its highest ever result in one constituency, gaining 14.5% of the votes cast in Glasgow North East, but it failed to win the seat.

== Results ==
Party	Seats					Aggregate votes		
Party	Total	Gains	Losses	Net	Of all (%)	Total	Of all (%)	Change (%)
Labour	40	0	5	▼5	67.8	907,249	38.7	▼4.4
Liberal Democrats	11	2	0	▲2	18.6	528,076	22.6	▲6.3
SNP	6	2	0	▲2	10.2	412,267	17.7	▼2.4
Conservative	1	1	0	▲1	1.7	369,388	15.8	▲0.2
Scottish Socialist	0	0	0	Steady	—	43,514	1.9	▼1.2
Green	0	0	0	Steady	—	25,760	1.1	▲1.1
Speaker	1	0	0	Steady	1.7	15,153	0.6	▼0.1
UKIP	0	0	0	Steady	—	8,859	0.4	▲0.3
Socialist Labour	0	0	0	Steady	—	6,696	0.3	▲0.2
Independent	0	0	0	Steady	—	4,417	0.2	Steady
Christian	0	New			—	4,004	0.2	New
BNP	0	0	0	Steady	—	1,591	0.1	▲0.1
Scottish Unionist	0	0	0	Steady	—	1,266	0.1	Steady
Scottish Senior Citizens	0	New			—	1,017	0.0	New
Liberal	0	0	0	Steady	—	916	0.0	Steady
Free Scotland	0	New			—	743	0.0	New
Pensioners Party Scotland	0	New			—	716	0.0	New
Publican — Free to Smoke	0	New			—	678	0.0	New
Pride in Paisley	0	New			—	381	0.0	New
Independent Green Voice	0	New			—	379	0.0	New
Sottish Independence	0	New			—	337	0.0	New
Legalise Cannabis	0	0	0	Steady	—	311	0.0	Steady
Death, Dungeons & Taxes	0	New			—	89	0.0	New
Communist	0	0	0	Steady	—	80	0.0	Steady
Total	59			0	100.0	2,333,887	100.0	0.0
Registered voters, and turnout						3,839,900	60.6	▲2.4

2005 map of Scottish Constituencies - Results

=== Votes and seats summary ===
Popular vote
Labour	67.8%
Liberal Democrats	22.6%
SNP	17.7%
Conservative	15.8%
Socialist	1.9%
Greens	1.1%
Other	1.4%

Parliament seats
Labour	67.8%
Liberal Democrats	18.6%
SNP	10.2%
Conservative	1.7%
Speaker	1.7%

== See also ==
- 2005 United Kingdom general election in England
- 2005 United Kingdom general election in Northern Ireland
- 2005 United Kingdom general election in Wales
