= 2005 Omaha mayoral election =

- May 10, 2005
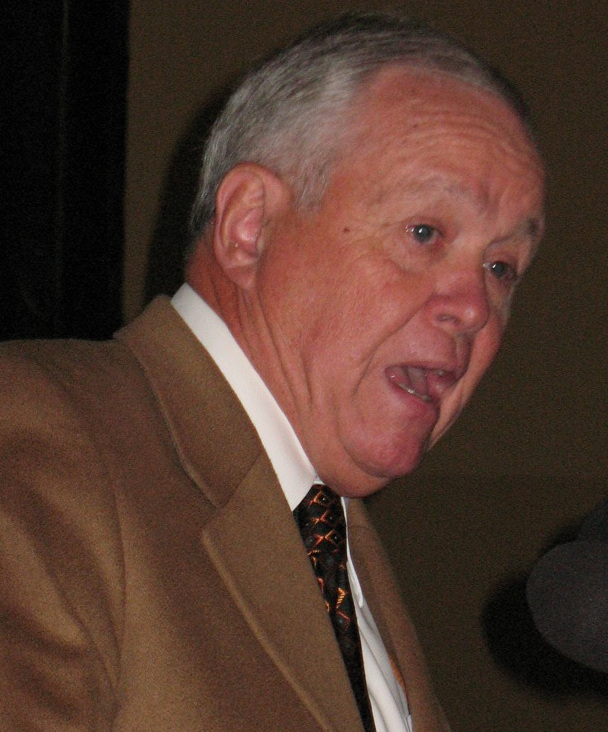

Nominee	Mike Fahey	David Friend
Popular vote	37,683	24,270
Percentage	60.68%	39.08%
Mayor before election
Mike Fahey
Democratic
Elected mayor
Mike Fahey
Democratic

The 2005 Omaha mayoral election was held on May 10, 2005. Incumbent Mayor Mike Fahey ran for re-election to a second term. He was challenged by David Friend, a member of the Metropolitan Utilities District Board of Governors, and defeated him in a landslide.

== Primary election ==
=== Candidates ===
- Mike Fahey, incumbent Mayor
- David Friend, member of the Metropolitan Utilities District Board of Governors

=== Results ===
2005 Omaha mayoral primary election results
Party	Candidate	Votes	%
Nonpartisan	Mike Fahey (inc.)	25,222	60.45%
Nonpartisan	David Friend	16,371	39.26%
Write-in		145	0.35%
Total votes		41,738	100.00%

== General election ==
=== Results ===
2005 Omaha mayoral general election results
Party	Candidate	Votes	%
Nonpartisan	Mike Fahey (inc.)	37,683	60.73%
Nonpartisan	David Friend	24,270	39.13%
Write-in		145	0.23%
Total votes		62,098	100.00%
