= 2005 Raleigh mayoral election =

- October 11, 2005

Candidate	Charles Meeker	J. H. Ross	Steve Hilton
Popular vote	19,219	6,654	1,638
Percentage	69.26%	23.98%	5.90%
Mayor before election
Charles Meeker
Democratic
Elected mayor
Charles Meeker
Democratic

The Raleigh mayoral election of 2005 was held on 11 October 2005 to elect a Mayor of Raleigh, North Carolina. It was won by Democratic incumbent Charles Meeker, who defeated Republican J. H. Ross in the first-round primary. Because Meeker won more than 50% in the first round, there was no need for a run-off.

== Results ==
2005 Raleigh mayoral election
Party	Candidate	Votes	%	±%
Democratic	Charles Meeker (incumbent)	19,219	69.26	
Republican	J. H. Ross	6,654	23.98	
Libertarian	Steve Hilton	1,638	5.90	
Other	Write-ins	238	0.86	
Turnout		27,749		
