= 2005 Puerto Rican unicameralism referendum =

- July 10, 2005
- Referendum on preference between whether the Legislative Assembly should remain made up of two chambers or if it should change to a single chamber.

Results
Choice	Votes	%
Change to a single chamber	464,010	83.95%
Remain as two chambers	88,733	16.05%
Valid votes	552,743	99.78%
Invalid or blank votes	1,212	0.22%
Total votes	553,955	100.00%
Registered voters/turnout	2,453,292	22.58%

A referendum on how many chambers the Legislative Assembly should have was held in Puerto Rico on July 10, 2005. The proposed change to a unicameral legislature was supported by 83.94% of those voting, although voter turnout was just 22.58%. However, another referendum would have to be held to approve the specific amendments to the constitution that are required for the change. The House of Representatives subsequently let the bill die, so the changes were not realised. Had the changes been approved, the legislature would have become unicameral from 2009 onwards.

== Campaign ==
The Puerto Rican Independence Party supported the victorious "yes" vote in favor of one chamber. The Popular Democratic Party did not take an official stance on the matter, with its leadership supporting or opposing the measure. The New Progressive Party opposed the constitutional amendment under electoral review, but supported abstention from the vote.

== Results ==
Choice	Votes	%
One chamber	464,010	83.95
Two chambers	88,733	16.05
Total	552,743	100.00
Valid votes	552,743	99.78
Invalid/blank votes	1,212	0.22
Total votes	553,955	100.00
Registered voters/turnout	2,453,292	22.58
Source: Direct Democracy
