= 2005 Organization of American States Secretary General election =

The Organization of American States Secretary General election was a series of special sessions of the General Assembly of the Organization of American States (OAS) held during 2005 in Washington, D.C., United States to elect a new Secretary General. The first special session, held on 11 April 2005 at the OAS headquarters, ended in a tie between Chile's Interior Minister José Miguel Insulza and Mexico's Foreign Minister Luis Ernesto Derbez, and forced the Organization to schedule a second round of elections for 2 May 2005 to end the unprecedented stalemate. On 29 April 2005, Mexico withdrew its candidate, which allowed Chile's Insulza to be elected in the next special session as Secretary General, with 31 votes, two abstentions and one vote left blank.

== Background and candidates ==
On 8 October 2004, the newly elected Secretary General, former president of Costa Rica Miguel Ángel Rodríguez, facing corruption allegations in his home country, announced his resignation from the OAS position, effective 15 October. Assistant Secretary General Luigi R. Einaudi (a U.S. career diplomat) assumed the office as a temporary measure. After a period of uncertainty lasting several months, it was decided that rather than wait until the regular General Assembly (to take place in Fort Lauderdale, United States, in June 2005), a special session of the General Assembly would be held at OAS headquarters on 7 April 2005; that date was later changed to 11 April, due to Pope John Paul II's funeral.

Three candidates emerged for the post:

- Francisco Flores Pérez, former president of El Salvador
- Luis Ernesto Derbez, foreign minister of Mexico
- José Miguel Insulza, interior minister of Chile

Francisco Flores's nomination had the official support of the United States, and he was thought to be a "joint Central American" candidate to replace Rodríguez, given that consensus was that it was Central America's "turn" to head the OAS.

Derbez's candidacy was officially launched by President of Mexico Vicente Fox on 7 December 2004. Derbez claimed to have the support of Belize, Bolivia, Canada, Honduras and Saint Vincent and the Grenadines.

Chile announced Insulza as its candidate two days later; it claimed the support of Argentina, Brazil, Ecuador, Venezuela, Uruguay and most of the Caribbean Community (CARICOM)-bloc member states. Derbez's nomination came as a surprise to Chile, because it was Mexico who had proposed Chile to nominate Insulza. In an unexplained move, Mexico, knowing Chile was near announcing Insulza, declared Derbez its candidate first.

On 8 April 2005, Francisco Flores withdrew his candidacy. He alleged the race was becoming too divisive for the Mesoamerican region. He also had the fewest supporters of the three. Flores, who initially appeared a promising choice, began losing support as the negotiations progressed. Up until Flores's withdrawal from the race, the U.S. State Department maintained that it wanted a Central American ex-president, and that Flores was its choice. Flores had the endorsement of El Salvador, Guatemala, Costa Rica, Nicaragua, and the Dominican Republic; significantly, from the earliest days of campaigning, neighboring Honduras said it would be unable to support Flores.

== First round election ==
On 11 April 2005, the foreign ministers of the American nations (or their plenipotentiary representatives) gathered to elect the new Secretary General. Three successive rounds of voting resulted in a tie, with 17 votes going for each of the two candidates. After a recess of slightly over two hours, fourth and fifth ballots were held which also failed to break the tie. A press report published in the Buenos Aires daily La Nación on 12 April indicated that during that break, Roger Noriega of the U.S. state department and the foreign ministers of the Mercosur countries had been able to convince Grenada and Paraguay, respectively, to change their votes. Thus, although the fourth and fifth rounds also resulted in ties, the distribution of votes was allegedly different from the breakdown in the first three. Because of this unprecedented stalemate, in a private 30-minute gathering the states' representatives decided that a new vote would take place on 2 May 2005.

=== Voting breakdown ===
This is a list of the member countries according to their statements of official support for one or other of the candidates, together with inferences of the voting intentions of the other states as reported in the international press. All 34 active member nations of the OAS were entitled to one vote each. An absolute majority (18 votes) was needed to win the election.

For the purposes of the following table, the OAS member states have been grouped into four regional blocs:

- CARICOM member states (14) are highlighted in green.
- South American Community of Nations member states (10) are highlighted in blue (Guyana and Suriname are members of both the CARICOM and SACN, but are grouped with the former.)
- North American Free Trade Agreement member states (3) are highlighted in pink.
- The Spanish-speaking nations of Central America and the Caribbean (7) are highlighted in yellow.

Luis Ernesto Derbez
Declared votes

1. Belize
2. Saint Vincent and the Grenadines
3. Bolivia
4. Canada
5. Mexico
6. United States
7. Costa Rica
8. El Salvador
9. Honduras
10. Nicaragua

Undeclared likely votes

11. Bahamas
12. Haiti
13. Grenada
14. Colombia
15. Peru
16. Guatemala
17. Panama

José Miguel Insulza
Declared votes

1. Argentina
2. Brazil
3. Chile
4. Ecuador
5. Paraguay
6. Uruguay
7. Venezuela
8. Dominican Republic

Undeclared likely votes

9. Antigua and Barbuda
10. Barbados
11. Dominica
12. Guyana
13. Jamaica
14. Saint Kitts and Nevis
15. Saint Lucia
16. Suriname
17. Trinidad and Tobago

== Second round election ==
Even though the 2 May re-run of the election allowed new contenders to stand in addition to the two existing candidates, no new candidates emerged. The press had initially speculated that Manuel Rodríguez Cuadros, the current foreign minister of Peru, would have been a likely "consensus" candidate in the new scenario, and on 12 April, the Lima daily Perú 21 gave the name of former transitional president Valentín Paniagua as another option. As the weeks progressed, however, nothing further was heard about a Peruvian candidacy. The Canadian media also suggested that their foreign minister Pierre Pettigrew may be a candidate in the second round, but Pettigrew was dissuaded by Prime Minister Paul Martin. The continuing deadlock appeared to be broken with Haiti's 27 April announcement of its intention to support Insulza in the second round (Haiti was believed to have voted for Derbez in the first election).

Both Derbez and Insulza initially confirmed that they would remain in the race. However, in a surprise development, and after intense negotiations between Mexico, Chile and the United States at the third Ministerial Meeting of the Community of Democracies in Santiago, Chile, on 29 April, Colombian foreign minister Carolina Barco announced that Derbez was withdrawing his candidacy, "in order to prevent a breakdown of hemispheric relations". This left Insulza as the sole candidate for the post.

At the Thirtieth Special Session of the General Assembly held on 2 May 2005, José Miguel Insulza was duly elected to serve as Secretary General of the Organization of American States. Voting was 31 in favor, two abstentions (believed to have been Mexico and Bolivia), and one vote left blank (announced in advance by Peru). Insulza took office on 26 May.

== See also ==
- United States-Latin American relations
