= List of electorates in the 2005 New Zealand general election by party vote =

This is a sortable list of the percentage of the party vote each party received in each individual electorate in the 2005 New Zealand general election.

Electorate	Labour	National	New Zealand First	Green	United Future	Māori Party	ACT	Progressive	Other
Overall	41.10%	39.10%	5.72%	5.30%	2.67%	2.12%	1.51%	1.16%	1.31%
Aoraki	39.96%	43.06%	6.02%	4.48%	2.58%	0.11%	1.17%	1.54%	1.08%
Auckland Central	45.24%	33.72%	2.84%	12.98%	1.30%	0.61%	1.79%	0.81%	0.71%
Banks Peninsula	40.10%	38.48%	3.48%	10.43%	3.52%	0.20%	1.09%	1.98%	0.72%
Bay of Plenty	28.08%	49.12%	12.05%	3.32%	3.89%	0.62%	0.91%	0.87%	1.14%
Christchurch Central	48.31%	30.51%	4.04%	9.70%	3.04%	0.34%	1.06%	1.87%	1.13%
Christchurch East	53.44%	27.86%	4.79%	5.51%	3.33%	0.27%	0.78%	2.62%	1.40%
Clevedon	31.61%	52.01%	6.72%	2.46%	2.15%	0.53%	2.41%	1.01%	1.10%
Clutha-Southland	28.70%	57.15%	4.57%	2.37%	3.39%	0.21%	1.91%	0.76%	0.94%
Coromandel	31.71%	44.16%	10.07%	7.46%	2.46%	0.45%	1.53%	0.98%	1.18%
Dunedin North	54.82%	25.14%	2.85%	10.82%	2.76%	0.29%	0.99%	1.32%	1.01%
Dunedin South	57.13%	27.21%	4.39%	5.41%	2.47%	0.22%	0.75%	1.40%	1.02%
East Coast Bays	31.77%	52.27%	4.77%	3.49%	2.39%	0.26%	2.57%	0.91%	1.57%
East Coast	38.99%	42.20%	6.77%	4.25%	2.96%	1.59%	0.69%	1.00%	1.55%
Epsom	27.22%	58.51%	2.44%	5.33%	1.75%	0.29%	3.40%	0.56%	0.50%
Hamilton East	35.52%	45.44%	5.85%	5.53%	3.41%	0.62%	1.94%	0.92%	0.77%
Hamilton West	41.29%	40.03%	7.47%	3.85%	2.85%	0.67%	1.61%	1.05%	1.18%
Helensville	27.97%	55.09%	5.88%	4.03%	2.47%	0.41%	2.35%	0.81%	0.99%
Hutt South	47.52%	35.09%	3.86%	5.60%	3.88%	0.59%	1.29%	1.03%	1.14%
Ikaroa-Rawhiti	58.28%	2.73%	4.63%	2.43%	0.38%	28.06%	0.18%	0.30%	3.01%
Ilam	34.54%	49.24%	3.42%	5.36%	3.58%	0.17%	1.89%	1.25%	0.55%
Invercargill	45.18%	39.49%	4.81%	3.08%	3.22%	0.33%	1.15%	1.22%	1.52%
Kaikoura	36.04%	45.02%	5.86%	5.77%	2.82%	0.38%	1.45%	1.61%	1.05%
Mana	49.98%	31.54%	3.88%	6.23%	4.20%	0.77%	1.00%	1.08%	1.32%
Mangere	72.89%	13.58%	4.15%	1.75%	1.63%	1.15%	0.49%	1.50%	2.86%
Manukau East	54.87%	30.98%	4.35%	1.77%	1.47%	0.62%	1.91%	1.59%	2.44%
Manurewa	59.11%	25.70%	5.55%	1.95%	2.02%	1.32%	0.75%	1.29%	2.31%
Maungakiekie	50.71%	33.48%	4.19%	4.15%	2.04%	0.60%	1.91%	1.36%	1.56%
Mt Albert	54.33%	26.35%	3.38%	9.27%	2.01%	0.52%	2.02%	1.11%	1.01%
Mt Roskill	49.70%	34.77%	3.53%	4.17%	2.49%	0.36%	2.48%	1.18%	1.32%
Napier	41.00%	42.32%	5.58%	5.23%	2.45%	0.42%	1.09%	0.89%	1.02%
Nelson	42.96%	37.01%	4.33%	7.74%	3.50%	0.24%	1.05%	1.13%	2.04%
New Lynn	49.09%	33.06%	4.79%	5.60%	2.48%	0.39%	2.26%	1.23%	1.10%
New Plymouth	44.53%	37.64%	6.11%	5.45%	2.37%	0.44%	1.18%	0.75%	1.53%
North Shore	29.91%	53.49%	4.47%	5.16%	2.14%	0.28%	3.04%	0.69%	0.82%
Northcote	39.11%	43.01%	5.00%	5.08%	2.38%	0.42%	2.65%	1.23%	1.12%
Northland	30.23%	45.69%	10.19%	6.44%	1.99%	1.56%	1.53%	0.88%	1.49%
Ohariu-Belmont	39.57%	43.13%	2.75%	5.84%	5.55%	0.28%	1.49%	0.64%	0.75%
Otago	39.59%	44.37%	3.82%	6.11%	2.13%	0.17%	1.59%	1.06%	1.16%
Otaki	41.67%	39.20%	6.79%	4.55%	3.35%	0.74%	0.99%	1.59%	1.12%
Pakuranga	30.04%	53.28%	5.85%	2.52%	2.44%	0.20%	3.76%	0.83%	1.28%
Palmerston North	44.98%	36.69%	5.14%	6.50%	3.29%	0.49%	0.88%	1.14%	0.89%
Piako	30.62%	50.49%	8.92%	3.11%	2.54%	0.43%	2.16%	0.73%	1.00%
Port Waikato	25.90%	54.93%	8.38%	3.73%	2.34%	0.64%	2.29%	0.67%	1.12%
Rakaia	30.85%	52.25%	4.97%	3.88%	3.23%	0.14%	2.36%	1.58%	0.74%
Rangitikei	36.08%	46.03%	7.39%	3.39%	3.21%	0.61%	1.39%	0.90%	1.00%
Rimutaka	47.80%	34.04%	5.01%	4.17%	4.66%	0.52%	1.20%	1.30%	1.30%
Rodney	27.82%	52.65%	8.08%	4.34%	3.09%	0.28%	1.80%	0.85%	1.09%
Rongotai	49.96%	27.84%	3.02%	12.62%	2.91%	0.63%	1.03%	1.07%	0.92%
Rotorua	41.89%	36.67%	9.24%	3.77%	2.96%	1.56%	1.19%	0.86%	1.86%
Tainui	55.68%	4.14%	6.20%	2.77%	0.39%	27.70%	0.26%	0.28%	2.58%
Tamaki	32.30%	53.87%	3.78%	3.87%	1.67%	0.40%	2.74%	0.72%	0.65%
Tamaki Makaurau	55.14%	4.03%	5.32%	3.28%	0.44%	27.48%	0.21%	0.34%	3.76%
Taranaki-King Country	25.05%	56.42%	8.06%	3.15%	2.03%	0.61%	2.09%	0.81%	1.78%
Taupo	37.30%	44.25%	7.75%	3.71%	2.61%	1.15%	1.22%	0.97%	1.04%
Tauranga	30.23%	45.28%	13.26%	3.51%	4.47%	0.34%	0.90%	0.77%	1.24%
Te Atatū	52.03%	30.38%	5.87%	3.42%	3.07%	0.70%	1.62%	1.11%	1.80%
Te Tai Hauauru	53.10%	3.58%	4.81%	3.16%	0.55%	31.68%	0.15%	0.21%	2.76%
Te Tai Tokerua	49.33%	5.01%	7.86%	2.69%	0.41%	31.00%	0.25%	0.36%	3.09%
Te Tai Tonga	57.89%	7.37%	6.25%	6.47%	1.06%	17.55%	0.29%	0.85%	2.27%
Tukituki	37.66%	46.50%	5.22%	3.87%	2.41%	0.72%	1.15%	1.29%	1.18%
Waiariki	53.11%	2.83%	6.68%	2.30%	0.45%	30.79%	0.11%	0.24%	3.49%
Waimakariri	41.48%	41.68%	6.17%	3.84%	3.26%	0.16%	0.91%	1.53%	0.97%
Wairarapa	36.06%	45.12%	8.93%	4.57%	2.01%	0.51%	1.14%	0.81%	0.85%
Waitakere	46.65%	34.16%	5.62%	5.92%	2.94%	0.66%	1.33%	1.15%	1.57%
Wellington Central	43.35%	32.66%	1.71%	15.78%	2.58%	0.41%	2.05%	0.75%	0.71%
West Coast-Tasman	37.22%	39.59%	6.29%	9.03%	3.03%	0.37%	1.08%	1.73%	1.66%
Whanganui	39.99%	41.13%	6.70%	4.49%	2.71%	0.81%	0.91%	1.37%	1.89%
Whangarei	36.22%	43.11%	9.04%	4.63%	1.79%	0.74%	1.99%	1.15%	1.33%
Wigram	47.95%	29.16%	4.65%	5.80%	3.87%	0.27%	0.75%	6.46%	1.09%
