= 2005 Kiso mayoral election =

Kiso District, Nagano held a mayoral election on November 27, 2005 after the merger of four towns into a new district. Independent Tanaka Katsumi won the election.

== Candidates ==
- Isoo Hideo, a former prefectural government official.
- Tanaka Katsumi, Independent candidate and former mayor of Kiso-Fukushima. Supported by the Japanese Communist Party

== Results ==
Mayoral election 2005: Kiso District
Party	Candidate	Votes	%	±%
Independent, JCP	Tanaka Katsumi	5,637		
Independent	Isoo Hideo	3,965		
Turnout		9,692	85.29 %	
