= 2005 Ibaraki gubernatorial election =

Ibaraki Prefecture in Japan held a gubernatorial on September 11, 2005. Incumbent governor Masaru Hashimoto was re-elected. All candidates stood as independents but were backed by different parties.

Mayoral election 2005: Kawasaki
Party	Candidate	Votes	%	±%
Independent (LDP),(NKP),(SDP)	Masaru Hashimoto	1,080,453		
Independent (JCP)	Takako Mamiya	404,323		
Turnout		1,543,485	64.73	34.80
