= November 2005 San Francisco general election =

The November 2005 San Francisco general elections were held on November 8, 2005, in San Francisco, California. The elections included eight California ballot propositions as part of a special election, those for San Francisco assessor-recorder, city attorney, and treasurer, and nine San Francisco ballot measures.

Ranked-choice voting was used to elect the assessor-recorder and city treasurer. Voters were allowed to rank their first, second, and third choices for each office. The incumbent city attorney ran unopposed.

== Assessor-recorder ==
Incumbent Phil Ting, appointed in July 2005 by mayor Gavin Newsom, won reelection against supervisor Gerardo Sandoval and former chief deputy assessor-recorder Ronald Chun.

San Francisco assessor-recorder election, 2005
| Candidate | Votes | % |
|---|---|---|
| Phil Ting (incumbent) | 92,729 | 47.43 |
| Gerardo Sandoval | 70,686 | 36.16 |
| Ronald Chun | 32,068 | 16.40 |
| Anthony Faber (write-in) | 18 | 0.01 |
| Valid votes | 195,501 | 85.11% |
| Invalid or blank votes | 34,213 | 14.89 |
| Total votes | 229,714 | 100.00 |
| Turnout | {{{votes}}} | 53.61% |
Ranked choice voting — Pass 1
| Phil Ting (incumbent) | 94,062 | 47.21 |
| Gerardo Sandoval | 71,850 | 36.06 |
| Ronald Chun (eliminated) | 33,294 | 16.71 |
| Anthony Faber (write-in, eliminated) | 18 | 0.01 |
| Eligible votes | 199,244 | 88.41% |
| Exhausted votes | 26,146 | 11.59% |
| Total votes | 225,370 | 100.00 |
Ranked choice voting — Pass 2
| Phil Ting (incumbent) | 110,053 | 58.13 |
| Gerardo Sandoval | 79,261 | 41.87 |
| Eligible votes | 189,314 | 84.00% |
| Exhausted votes | 36,056 | 16.00% |
| Total votes | 225,370 | 100.00 |

== City attorney ==
One-term incumbent Dennis Herrera won reelection unopposed.

San Francisco city attorney election, 2005
| Candidate | Votes | % |
|---|---|---|
| Dennis Herrera (incumbent) | 182,034 | 98.07 |
| Write-in | 3,573 | 1.93 |
| Valid votes | 185,607 | 80.80% |
| Invalid or blank votes | 44,107 | 19.20 |
| Total votes | 229,714 | 100.00 |
| Turnout | {{{votes}}} | 53.61% |

== Treasurer ==
Incumbent José Cisneros, appointed by mayor Gavin Newsom in September 2004, won reelection.

San Francisco treasurer election, 2005
| Candidate | Votes | % |
|---|---|---|
| José Cisneros (incumbent) | 107,632 | 61.32 |
| Calvin Louie | 43,020 | 24.53 |
| Isaac Wang | 16,054 | 9.15 |
| Manuel B. Valle | 8,692 | 4.96 |
| Valid votes | 175,398 | 76.35% |
| Invalid or blank votes | 54,316 | 23.65 |
| Total votes | 229,714 | 100.00 |
| Turnout | {{{votes}}} | 53.61% |

== Propositions ==
Note: "City" refers to the San Francisco municipal government.

=== Proposition A ===

Proposition A would allow City College of San Francisco to issue $246.3 million in bonds to finance expansion, improvements, and maintenance. This proposition required a majority of 55% to pass.

Proposition A
| Choice | Votes | % |
|---|---|---|
| For | 134,999 | 63.88 |
| Against | 76,320 | 36.12 |
| Required majority | | 55.00 |
| Total | 211,319 | 100.00 |
| Valid votes | 211,319 | 91.99 |
| Invalid/blank votes | 18,395 | 8.01 |
| Total votes | 229,714 | 100.00 |
| Registered voters/turnout | | 53.61 |

=== Proposition B ===

Proposition B would allow the city to issue $208 million in bonds to finance street and sidewalk improvements. This proposition required a two-thirds majority to pass.

Proposition B
| Choice | Votes | % |
|---|---|---|
| For | 119,095 | 56.43 |
| Against | 91,952 | 43.57 |
| Required majority | | 66.67 |
| Total | 211,047 | 100.00 |
| Valid votes | 211,047 | 91.87 |
| Invalid/blank votes | 18,667 | 8.13 |
| Total votes | 229,714 | 100.00 |
| Registered voters/turnout | | 53.61 |

=== Proposition C ===

Proposition C would change the budget process for the Ethics Commission and allow it to hire outside counsel if the City Attorney is the subject of an investigation or audit.

Proposition C
| Choice | Votes | % |
|---|---|---|
| For | 81,672 | 40.30 |
| Against | 120,968 | 59.70 |
| Total | 202,640 | 100.00 |
| Valid votes | 202,640 | 88.21 |
| Invalid/blank votes | 27,074 | 11.79 |
| Total votes | 229,714 | 100.00 |
| Registered voters/turnout | | 53.61 |

=== Proposition D ===

Proposition D would change the composition of the San Francisco Municipal Transportation Agency board by allowing the Mayor to appoint four members and the President of the San Francisco Board of Supervisors to appoint three.

Proposition D
| Choice | Votes | % |
|---|---|---|
| For | 71,585 | 35.55 |
| Against | 129,801 | 64.45 |
| Total | 201,386 | 100.00 |
| Valid votes | 201,386 | 87.67 |
| Invalid/blank votes | 28,328 | 12.33 |
| Total votes | 229,714 | 100.00 |
| Registered voters/turnout | | 53.61 |

=== Proposition E ===

Proposition E would change the election of the Assessor-Recorder and Public Defender from the statewide primary in June to the following November general election.

Proposition E
| Choice | Votes | % |
|---|---|---|
| For | 138,765 | 70.17 |
| Against | 58,998 | 29.83 |
| Total | 197,763 | 100.00 |
| Valid votes | 197,793 | 86.09 |
| Invalid/blank votes | 31,951 | 13.91 |
| Total votes | 229,744 | 100.00 |
| Registered voters/turnout | | 53.61 |

=== Proposition F ===

Proposition F would maintain and operate all 42 firehouses and certain emergency vehicles and equipment at levels used on January 1, 2004.

Proposition F
| Choice | Votes | % |
|---|---|---|
| For | 119,581 | 57.59 |
| Against | 88,062 | 42.41 |
| Total | 207,643 | 100.00 |
| Valid votes | 207,643 | 90.39 |
| Invalid/blank votes | 22,071 | 9.61 |
| Total votes | 229,714 | 100.00 |
| Registered voters/turnout | | 53.61 |

=== Proposition G ===

Proposition G would allow the underground parking garage at Golden Gate Park to have an entrance-exit inside the park and limit the number of automobile traffic lanes inside the park.

Proposition G
| Choice | Votes | % |
|---|---|---|
| For | 138,069 | 67.70 |
| Against | 65,862 | 32.30 |
| Total | 203,931 | 100.00 |
| Valid votes | 203,931 | 88.78 |
| Invalid/blank votes | 25,783 | 11.22 |
| Total votes | 229,714 | 100.00 |
| Registered voters/turnout | | 53.61 |

=== Proposition H ===

Proposition H would ban the manufacture, distribution, sale, and transfer of firearms and ammunition in the city, and the possession of handguns by City residents in the city.

Proposition H
| Choice | Votes | % |
|---|---|---|
| For | 123,033 | 57.79 |
| Against | 89,856 | 42.21 |
| Total | 212,889 | 100.00 |
| Valid votes | 212,889 | 92.68 |
| Invalid/blank votes | 16,825 | 7.32 |
| Total votes | 229,714 | 100.00 |
| Registered voters/turnout | | 53.61 |

=== Proposition I ===

Proposition I would make it City policy to oppose military recruiting in schools and to consider scholarships supporting alternatives to military service.

Proposition I
| Choice | Votes | % |
|---|---|---|
| For | 125,581 | 59.15 |
| Against | 86,723 | 40.85 |
| Total | 212,304 | 100.00 |
| Valid votes | 212,304 | 92.42 |
| Invalid/blank votes | 17,410 | 7.58 |
| Total votes | 229,714 | 100.00 |
| Registered voters/turnout | | 53.61 |
