= 2005 United Kingdom general election in England =

- 5 May 2005

All 529 English seats to the House of Commons
- Turnout: 61.3% (▲2.1 pp)
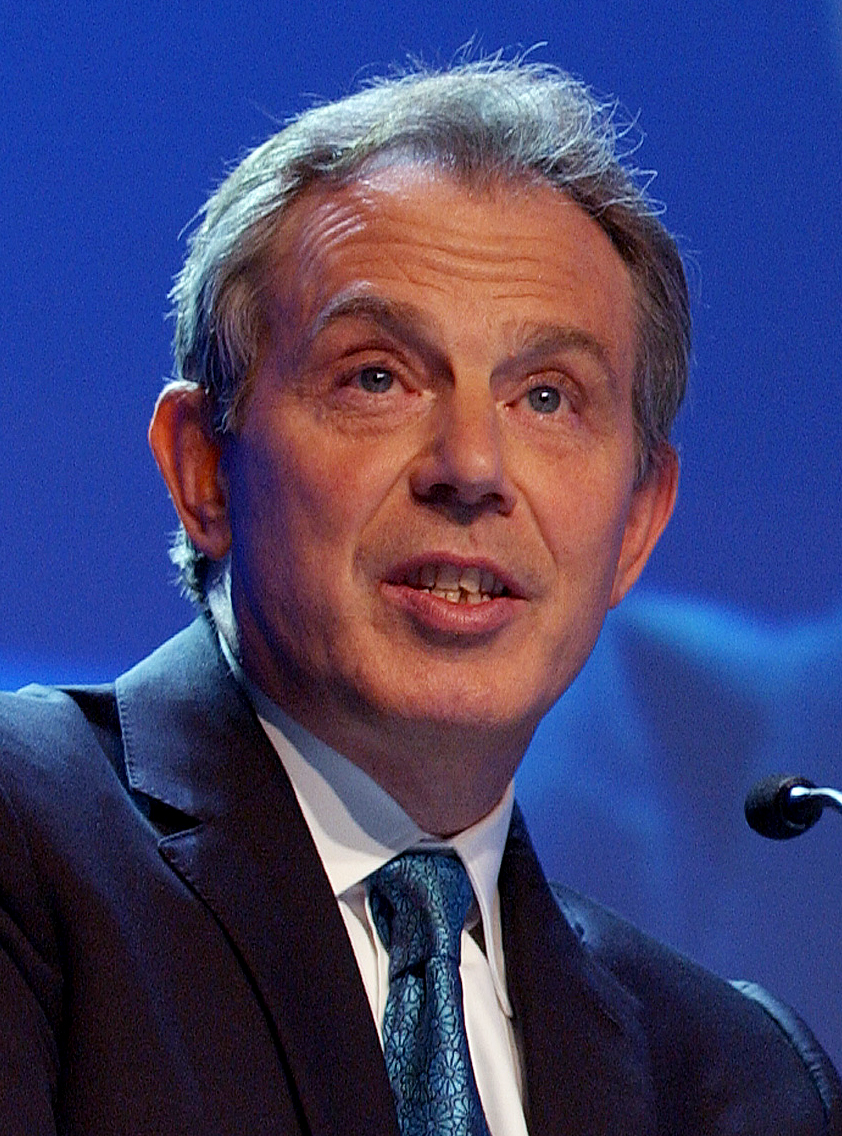

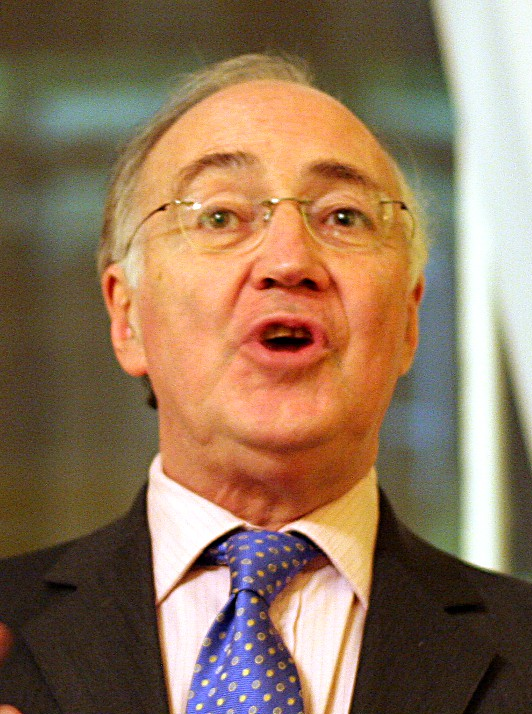

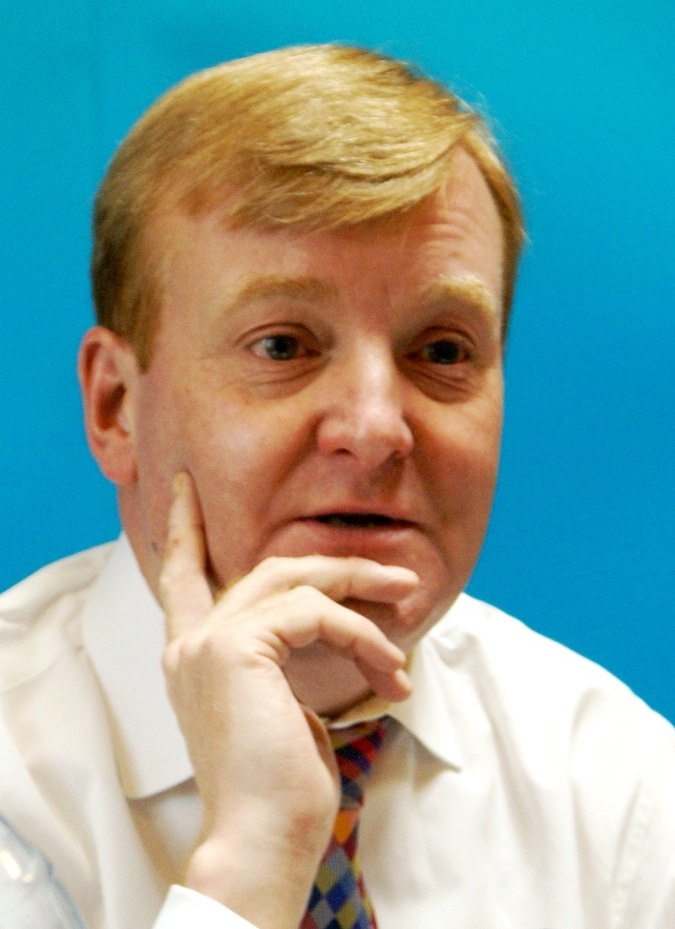
| | First party | Second party | Third party |
|---|---|---|---|
| Leader | Tony Blair | Michael Howard | Charles Kennedy |
| Party | Labour | Conservative | Liberal Democrats |
| Leader since | 21 July 1994 | 6 November 2003 | 9 August 1999 |
| Leader's seat | Sedgefield | Folkestone and Hythe | Ross, Skye & Inverness West |
| Last election | 323 seats, 41.4% | 165 seats, 35.2% | 40 seats, 19.4% |
| Seats won | 286 | 194 | 47 |
| Seat change | ▼37 | ▲29 | ▲7 |
| Popular vote | 8,050,366 | 8,114,979 | 5,201,129 |
| Percentage | 35.5% | 35.7% | 22.9% |
| Swing | ▼5.9 pp | ▲0.5 pp | ▲3.6 pp |

On Thursday 5 May 2005, the 2005 United Kingdom general election was held in England, to elect all 646 members of the House of Commons, with 529 constituencies being in England. The governing Labour Party under Tony Blair won an overall majority of seats for the third successive election.

Within England, the opposition Conservative Party received 72,544 more votes than the Labour Party, but Labour won an overall majority of English seats. The Liberal Democrats made modest gains, finishing with 23% of the vote and 47 seats. The only other parties to win seats were the Respect Party, who gained Bethnal Green and Bow from Labour, and Independent Kidderminster Hospital and Health Concern, who won Wyre Forest for the second election in a row.

== Candidates ==
Below is a table summarising the candidates of the 2005 general election in England,showing parties that stood 10 or more candidates each.

| Affiliation | Candidates |
|---|---|
| Conservative and Unionist Party | 529 |
| Labour Party | 529 |
| Liberal Democrats | 528 |
| UK Independence Party | 443 |
| Green Party of England and Wales | 173 |
| Independent | 152 |
| British National Party | 115 |
| Veritas | 62 |
| Socialist Labour Party | 33 |
| Respect Party | 24 |
| English Democrats | 24 |
| Official Monster Raving Loony Party | 19 |
| Socialist Party | 15 |
| National Front | 13 |
| Legalise Cannabis Alliance | 13 |
| Rainbow Dream Ticket | 13 |
| Liberal Party | 12 |
| Workers Revolutionary Party | 10 |
| Others | 110 |
| Total | 2,817 |

== Results ==
Below is a table summarising the results of the 2005 general election in England.

| Party | Seats | | | | | Aggregate Votes | | |
| Party | Total | Gains | Losses | Net | Of all (%) | Total | Of all (%) | Change (%) |
|---|---|---|---|---|---|---|---|---|
| Conservative | 194 | 32 | 3 | ▲29 | 36.7 | 8,114,979 | 35.7 | ▲0.5 |
| Labour | 286 | 0 | 37 | ▼37 | 54.1 | 8,050,366 | 35.5 | ▼5.9 |
| Liberal Democrats | 47 | 12 | 5 | ▲7 | 8.9 | 5,201,129 | 22.9 | ▲3.6 |
| UKIP | 0 | 0 | 0 | Steady | — | 576,817 | 2.5 | ▲0.8 |
| Green | 0 | 0 | 0 | Steady | — | 250,510 | 1.1 | ▲0.4 |
| BNP | 0 | 0 | 0 | Steady | — | 189,465 | 0.8 | ▲0.6 |
| Independent | 0 | 0 | 0 | Steady | — | 76,385 | 0.3 | ▼0.1 |
| Respect | 1 | New | | ▲1 | 0.2 | 67,451 | 0.3 | New |
| Veritas | 0 | New | | | — | 39,170 | 0.2 | New |
| Health Concern | 1 | 0 | 0 | Steady | 0.2 | 18,739 | 0.1 | Steady |
| Liberal | 0 | 0 | 0 | Steady | — | 17,547 | 0.1 | Steady |
| English Democrat | 0 | New | | | — | 15,149 | 0.2 | New |
| Socialist Labour | 0 | 0 | 0 | Steady | — | 11,866 | 0.1 | ▼0.1 |
| Socialist | 0 | 0 | 0 | Steady | — | 8,841 | 0.0 | Steady |
| National Front | 0 | 0 | 0 | Steady | — | 8,079 | 0.0 | Steady |
| Monster Raving Loony | 0 | 0 | 0 | Steady | — | 6,311 | 0.0 | Steady |
| Community Action | 0 | New | | | — | 5,984 | 0.0 | New |
| Legalise Cannabis | 0 | 0 | 0 | Steady | — | 4,867 | 0.0 | Steady |
| Mebyon Kernow | 0 | 0 | 0 | Steady | — | 3,552 | 0.0 | Steady |
| Christian | 0 | New | | | — | 3,291 | 0.0 | New |
| Community Group | 0 | New | | | — | 2,365 | 0.0 | New |
| Ashfield Ind. | 0 | New | | | — | 2,292 | 0.0 | New |
| Alliance for Green Socialism | 0 | New | | | — | 1,978 | 0.0 | New |
| Residents' Association of London | 0 | New | | | — | 1,850 | 0.0 | New |
| Rainbow Dream Ticket | 0 | Did not stand in 2001 | | | — | 1,289 | 0.0 | —N/a |
| Workers Revolutionary | 0 | 0 | 0 | Steady | — | 1,241 | 0.0 | Steady |
| New England | 0 | New | | | — | 1,224 | 0.0 | New |
| Community Group | 0 | New | | | — | 1,118 | 0.0 | New |
| Peace and Progress | 0 | New | | | — | 1,036 | 0.0 | New |
| Your Party | 0 | New | | | — | 1,006 | 0.0 | New |
| SOS Northampton | 0 | New | | | — | 932 | 0.0 | New |
| Ind. Working Class | 0 | New | | | — | 892 | 0.0 | New |
| Others | 0 | —N/a | | | — | 10,024 | 0.0 | —N/a |
| Total | 529 | | | 0 | 100.0 | 22,704,302 | 100.0 | 0.0 |
| Registered voters, and turnout | | | | | | 37,041,396 | 61.3 | ▲2.1 |

Popular vote
| Conservative | 35.7% |
| Labour | 35.4% |
| Liberal Democrats | 22.9% |
| UKIP | 2.6% |
| Green | 1.1% |
| BNP | 0.8% |
| Other | 2.3% |

Parliament seats
| Labour | 54.1% |
| Conservative | 36.7% |
| Liberal Democrats | 8.9% |
| Respect | 0.2% |
| ICHC | 0.2% |

== By region ==
Regional vote shares and changes are sourced from the BBC.

=== East Midlands ===
| Party | Seats | | | | | Aggregate Votes | | |
| Party | Total | Gains | Losses | Net | Of all (%) | Total | Of all (%) | Change (%) |
|---|---|---|---|---|---|---|---|---|
| Labour | 25 | 0 | 3 | ▼3 | 56.8 | 785,944 | 39.0 | ▼6.1 |
| Conservative | 18 | 3 | 0 | ▲3 | 40.9 | 747,438 | 37.1 | ▼0.2 |
| Liberal Democrats | 1 | 0 | 0 | Steady | 2.3 | 372,041 | 18.5 | ▲3.1 |
| UKIP | 0 | 0 | 0 | Steady | 0.0 | 52,998 | 2.6 | ▲1.5 |
| BNP | 0 | 0 | 0 | Steady | 0.0 | 10,299 | 0.5 | ▲0.4 |
| Green | 0 | 0 | 0 | Steady | 0.0 | 7,475 | 0.4 | ▲0.2 |
| Others | 0 | 0 | 0 | Steady | 0.0 | 39,087 | 1.9 | ▲1.7 |
| Total | 44 | | | | | 2,015,282 | 62.6 | ▲1.8 |

=== East of England ===
| Party | Seats | | | | | Aggregate Votes | | |
| Party | Total | Gains | Losses | Net | Of all (%) | Total | Of all (%) | Change (%) |
|---|---|---|---|---|---|---|---|---|
| Conservative | 40 | 6 | 0 | ▲6 | 71.4 | 1,147,180 | 43.3 | ▲1.5 |
| Labour | 13 | 0 | 7 | ▼7 | 23.2 | 790,372 | 29.8 | ▼7.0 |
| Liberal Democrats | 3 | 1 | 0 | ▲1 | 5.4 | 578,741 | 21.8 | ▲4.3 |
| UKIP | 0 | 0 | 0 | Steady | 0.0 | 83,112 | 3.1 | ▲0.9 |
| Green | 0 | 0 | 0 | Steady | 0.0 | 25,396 | 1.0 | ▲0.4 |
| BNP | 0 | 0 | 0 | Steady | 0.0 | 9,673 | 0.4 | ▲0.4 |
| Others | 0 | 0 | 0 | Steady | 0.0 | 15,339 | 0.5 | ▼0.1 |
| Total | 56 | | | | | 2,649,813 | 63.9 | ▲2.2 |

=== Greater London ===
| Party | Seats | | | | | Aggregate Votes | | |
| Party | Total | Gains | Losses | Net | Of all (%) | Total | Of all (%) | Change (%) |
|---|---|---|---|---|---|---|---|---|
| Labour | 44 | 0 | 11 | ▼11 | 59.5 | 1,135,687 | 38.9 | ▼8.4 |
| Conservative | 21 | 8 | 0 | ▲8 | 28.4 | 931,966 | 31.9 | ▲1.4 |
| Liberal Democrats | 8 | 2 | 0 | ▲2 | 10.8 | 638,333 | 21.9 | ▲4.4 |
| Green | 0 | 0 | 0 | Steady | 0.0 | 78,595 | 2.7 | ▲1.0 |
| UKIP | 0 | 0 | 0 | Steady | 0.0 | 42,956 | 1.5 | ▲0.5 |
| Respect | 1 | New | | ▲1 | 1.4 | 13,243 | 0.5 | New |
| BNP | 0 | 0 | 0 | Steady | 0.0 | 19,024 | 0.7 | ▲0.2 |
| Others | 0 | 0 | 0 | Steady | 0.0 | 30,894 | 1.0 | ▲0.3 |
| Total | 74 | | | | | 2,918,190 | 57.8 | ▲2.5 |

Greater London

=== North East England ===
| Party | Seats | | | | | Aggregate Votes | | |
| Party | Total | Gains | Losses | Net | Of all (%) | Total | Of all (%) | Change (%) |
|---|---|---|---|---|---|---|---|---|
| Labour | 28 | 0 | 0 | Steady | 93.3 | 580,453 | 52.9 | ▼6.5 |
| Liberal Democrats | 1 | 0 | 0 | Steady | 3.3 | 256,295 | 23.6 | ▲6.6 |
| Conservative | 1 | 0 | 0 | Steady | 3.3 | 214,414 | 19.5 | ▼1.8 |
| UKIP | 0 | 0 | 0 | Steady | 0.0 | 11,703 | 1.1 | ▲0.3 |
| BNP | 0 | 0 | 0 | Steady | 0.0 | 9,672 | 0.9 | ▲0.8 |
| Green | 0 | 0 | 0 | Steady | 0.0 | 2,787 | 0.3 | Steady |
| Others | 0 | 0 | 0 | Steady | 0.0 | 22,877 | 2.0 | ▲0.8 |
| Total | 30 | | | | | 1,098,201 | 57.1 | ▲0.7 |

=== North West England ===
| Party | Seats | | | | | Aggregate Votes | | |
| Party | Total | Gains | Losses | Net | Of all (%) | Total | Of all (%) | Change (%) |
|---|---|---|---|---|---|---|---|---|
| Labour | 61 | 0 | 3 | ▼3 | 80.3 | 1,327,670 | 45.1 | ▼5.6 |
| Conservative | 9 | 1 | 1 | Steady | 11.8 | 846,195 | 28.7 | ▼0.6 |
| Liberal Democrats | 6 | 3 | 0 | ▲3 | 7.9 | 629,250 | 21.4 | ▲4.7 |
| UKIP | 0 | 0 | 0 | Steady | 0.0 | 58,031 | 2.0 | ▲1.1 |
| BNP | 0 | 0 | 0 | Steady | 0.0 | 31,529 | 1.1 | ▲0.4 |
| Green | 0 | 0 | 0 | Steady | 0.0 | 10,012 | 0.3 | ▼0.1 |
| Others | 0 | 0 | 0 | Steady | 0.0 | 43,304 | 1.5 | ▲0.5 |
| Total | 76 | | | | | 2,945,991 | 57.2 | ▲1.3 |

=== South East England ===
| Party | Seats | | | | | Aggregate Votes | | |
| Party | Total | Gains | Losses | Net | Of all (%) | Total | Of all (%) | Change (%) |
|---|---|---|---|---|---|---|---|---|
| Conservative | 58 | 5 | 0 | ▲5 | 69.9 | 1,754,249 | 45.0 | ▲2.1 |
| Liberal Democrats | 6 | 0 | 2 | ▼2 | 7.2 | 990,480 | 25.4 | ▲1.7 |
| Labour | 19 | 0 | 3 | ▼3 | 22.9 | 951,323 | 24.4 | ▼5.0 |
| UKIP | 0 | 0 | 0 | Steady | 0.0 | 122,257 | 3.1 | ▲0.6 |
| Green | 0 | 0 | 0 | Steady | 0.0 | 51,910 | 1.3 | ▲0.5 |
| BNP | 0 | 0 | 0 | Steady | 0.0 | 3,740 | 0.1 | ▲0.1 |
| Others | 0 | 0 | 0 | Steady | 0.0 | 27,639 | 0.7 | ▲0.2 |
| Total | 83 | | | | | 3,901,598 | 64.2 | ▲2.6 |

=== South West England ===
| Party | Seats | | | | | Aggregate Votes | | |
| Party | Total | Gains | Losses | Net | Of all (%) | Total | Of all (%) | Change (%) |
|---|---|---|---|---|---|---|---|---|
| Conservative | 22 | 3 | 1 | ▲2 | 43.1 | 985,346 | 38.6 | ▲0.1 |
| Liberal Democrats | 16 | 3 | 2 | ▲1 | 31.4 | 831,134 | 32.6 | ▲1.4 |
| Labour | 13 | 0 | 3 | ▼3 | 25.5 | 582,522 | 22.8 | ▼3.5 |
| UKIP | 0 | 0 | 0 | Steady | 0.0 | 95,492 | 3.7 | ▲1.2 |
| Green | 0 | 0 | 0 | Steady | 0.0 | 33,012 | 1.3 | ▲0.5 |
| BNP | 0 | 0 | 0 | Steady | 0.0 | 1,958 | 0.1 | ▲0.1 |
| Others | 0 | 0 | 0 | Steady | 0.0 | 23,851 | 0.9 | ▲0.3 |
| Total | 51 | | | | | 2,553,315 | 66.4 | ▲1.5 |

=== West Midlands ===
| Party | Seats | | | | | Aggregate Votes | | |
| Party | Total | Gains | Losses | Net | Of all (%) | Total | Of all (%) | Change (%) |
|---|---|---|---|---|---|---|---|---|
| Labour | 39 | 0 | 4 | ▼4 | 66.1 | 937,418 | 38.9 | ▼6.1 |
| Conservative | 16 | 4 | 1 | ▲3 | 27.1 | 848,665 | 34.8 | ▲0.1 |
| Liberal Democrats | 3 | 2 | 1 | ▲1 | 5.1 | 450,110 | 18.6 | ▲3.8 |
| UKIP | 0 | 0 | 0 | Steady | 0.0 | 77,977 | 3.1 | ▲1.3 |
| BNP | 0 | 0 | 0 | Steady | 0.0 | 42,581 | 1.8 | ▲1.5 |
| Health Concern | 1 | 0 | 0 | Steady | 1.7 | 18,793 | 0.8 | ▼0.4 |
| Green | 0 | 0 | 0 | Steady | 0.0 | 15,048 | 0.6 | ▲0.2 |
| Others | 0 | 0 | 0 | Steady | 0.0 | 32,607 | 1.3 | ▼0.4 |
| Total | 59 | | | | | 2,423,145 | 60.9 | ▲2.3 |

=== Yorkshire and the Humber ===
| Party | Seats | | | | | Aggregate Votes | | |
| Party | Total | Gains | Losses | Net | Of all (%) | Total | Of all (%) | Change (%) |
|---|---|---|---|---|---|---|---|---|
| Labour | 44 | 0 | 3 | ▼3 | 78.6 | 958,006 | 43.6 | ▼5.0 |
| Conservative | 9 | 2 | 0 | ▲2 | 16.1 | 640,552 | 29.1 | ▼1.1 |
| Liberal Democrats | 3 | 1 | 0 | ▲1 | 5.4 | 454,705 | 20.7 | ▲3.6 |
| BNP | 0 | 0 | 0 | Steady | 0.0 | 60,990 | 2.8 | ▲2.6 |
| UKIP | 0 | 0 | 0 | Steady | 0.0 | 32,291 | 1.5 | ▼0.4 |
| Green | 0 | 0 | 0 | Steady | 0.0 | 26,316 | 1.2 | ▲0.3 |
| Others | 0 | 0 | 0 | Steady | 0.0 | 26,372 | 1.2 | ▲0.4 |
| Total | 56 | | | | | 2,199,232 | 59.0 | ▲2.2 |

== Analysis ==
The total Labour vote in England declined by 6% and by varying amounts in every English Region, but with sharp variations locally. For example, in Bethnal Green and Bow, London, former Labour MP George Galloway, running as a candidate for the anti-war Respect, defeated Oona King (Labour) who in the previous General Election had a majority of 10,057. Labour polled 70,000 fewer votes in England than the Conservatives, but won 92 more seats. Labour regained one of its by-election losses, Leicester South, but saw an increased Liberal Democrat majority in the other, Brent East. Overall, Labour lost 37 English MPs compared to 2001.

The Conservatives made gains in most regions of England, though their vote declined in some areas, notably the East Midlands and Yorkshire and the Humber (2% and 1.5% declines, respectively). However, even in regions where the Conservative vote declined, the Labour vote declined by a greater margin, allowing the Conservatives to make gains against Labour. Overall, the Conservatives gained 0.5% of the vote in England compared to 2001, and gained 29 seats. In Enfield Southgate, Conservative David Burrowes ousted Labour Stephen Twigg, who had famously defeated Michael Portillo for that seat in the 1997 elections.

The Liberal Democrats made modest gains in all regions of England, improving by at least 1% in every region. The party made a net gain of 7 seats, winning a total of 47, the best result for the Liberal Democrats or Liberals in England since 1923.

Former BBC presenter, Robert Kilroy-Silk, who had joined the UK Independence Party (UKIP) before leaving to set up Veritas, came fourth in Erewash in what was the best performance by Veritas, receiving 2,957 votes. The seat was won by Labour's Liz Blackman.

There were regional surges in support for the British National Party, who however failed to win any seats, their highest poll being 16.9% in the Labour stronghold of Barking, East London. The party fielded 119 candidates in seats throughout the country, gaining 0.7% of the total votes cast. The 119 candidates fielded represented a significant rise as in 2001, the BNP only fielded 33 candidates.

The Green Party came third in Brighton Pavilion (with Keith Taylor as candidate) behind Labour and the Conservatives, taking 21.9% of the votes cast. Despite this unprecedented high share of the vote Taylor was not selected to contest the seat in the 2010 general election, losing his prospective position to Caroline Lucas.

The English Democrats gained their highest percentage of the vote in Greenwich and Woolwich, winning 3.4% of votes cast.

The Independent Working Class Association stood for the first time in a general election, having previously only stood in local council elections. The party gained 2.1% of the vote in Oxford East.

== See also ==
- 2005 United Kingdom general election in Northern Ireland
- 2005 United Kingdom general election in Scotland
- 2005 United Kingdom general election in Wales
