= 2005 Western Australian retail trading hours referendum =

26 February 2005
- Do you believe that the Western Australian community would benefit if trading hours in the Perth Metropolitan Area were extended to allow general retail shops to trade until 9 pm Monday to Friday?
- Website: 2005 Retail Trading Hours Referendum

Results
Choice	Votes	%
Yes	457,183	41.34%
No	648,860	58.66%
Valid votes	1,106,043	97.96%
Invalid or blank votes	23,068	2.04%
Total votes	1,129,111	100.00%
Registered voters/turnout	1,259,262	89.66%

- Do you believe that the Western Australian community would benefit if trading hours in the Perth Metropolitan Area were extended to allow general retail shops to trade for 6 hours on Sunday?

Results
Choice	Votes	%
Yes	422,942	38.61%
No	672,478	61.39%
Valid votes	1,095,420	97.02%
Invalid or blank votes	33,644	2.98%
Total votes	1,129,064	100.00%
Registered voters/turnout	1,259,262	89.66%
- Results by division

The 2005 Western Australian retail trading hours referendum was held in Western Australia on 20 February 2005. The referendum failed, with a majority voting against both extended weeknight retail trading and Sunday retail trading.

== Questions ==
Question 1 Do you believe that the Western Australian community would benefit if trading hours in the Perth Metropolitan Area were extended to allow general retail shops to trade until 9 pm Monday to Friday?

Question 2 Do you believe that the Western Australian community would benefit if trading hours in the Perth Metropolitan Area were extended to allow general retail shops to trade for 6 hours on Sunday?

== Results ==
=== Weeknight trading ===
Region	On rolls	Ballots issued	Yes ✓	%	No ✗	%	Informal
North Metropolitan	388,999	351,520	150,386	43.55%	194,950	56.45%	6,184
South Metropolitan	271,044	243,937	104,328	40.69%	134,673	59.31%	4,936
East Metropolitan	273,378	249,158	99,577	44.81%	145,120	55.19%	4,461
Agricultural	95,041	85,592	24,809	29.62%	58,950	70.38%	1,833
South West	162,560	147,667	53,372	37.06%	90,635	62.94%	3,660
Mining and Pastoral	68,240	51,237	24,711	50.18%	24,532	49.82%	1,994
Total for State	1,259,262	1,129,111	457,183	41.34%	648,860	58.66%	23,068

=== Sunday trading ===
Region	On rolls	Ballots issued	Yes ✓	%	No ✗	%	Informal
North Metropolitan	388,999	351,548	135,594	39.62%	206,613	60.38%	9,341
South Metropolitan	271,044	243,938	96,831	40.92%	139,792	59.08%	7,315
East Metropolitan	273,378	249,152	89,403	36.85%	153,178	63.15%	6,571
Agricultural	95,041	85,596	23,270	28.05%	59,687	71.95%	2,639
South West	162,560	147,593	53,153	37.34%	89,212	62.66%	5,228
Mining and Pastoral	68,240	51,237	24,691	50.71%	23,996	49.29%	2,550
Total for State	1,259,262	1,129,064	422,942	38.61%	672,478	61.39%	33,644
