= 2005 Saitama mayoral election =

Saitama, capital of Saitama Prefecture held a mayoral election on May 15, 2005.

== Candidates ==
- Sōichi Aikawa, incumbent mayor backed by the Liberal Democratic Party (LDP) and Komeito.
- Nakamori Fukuyo, former member of Saitama prefecture assembly, running as an independent.
- Numata Michitaka, supported by the Japanese Communist Party (JCP)

== Results ==
Mayoral election 2005: Saitama City
| Party | Candidate | Votes | % | ±% |
|---|---|---|---|---|
| LDP, Komeito | Sōichi Aikawa | 135,553 | | |
| Independent | Nakamori Fukuyo | 121,735 | | |
| JCP | Numata Michitaka | 63,880 | | |
| Turnout | | 327,171 | 35.51% | |
