= 2005 Coahuila state election =

== 2005 Coahuila state election ==
On September 24 elections took place in the Mexican state of Coahuila to elect its governor, deputies in the state legislature and presidents for the 38 municipios the state is divided in.

== Results ==
With 98% of polling stations accounted for by September 25 the results are:

=== Governor ===
- Humberto Moreira (Institutional Revolutionary Party, PRI), had 55.5% of the vote.
- Jorge Zermeño (National Action Party, PAN), had 33%.
- Juan Pablo Rodríguez (Democratic Revolution Party, PRD), had 3% of the vote.
- Ramón Díaz Avila (Labor Party, PT), had 1.3% of the vote.
- Ana Patricia Reynoso Alvarado (Green Party), had 0.66% of the vote.

=== Municipal Presidents ===
- PRI. 28 (of 38).

=== State legislature ===
- PRI. 16 through majority for a total of 20.
- PAN. 4 through majority for a total of 8.
- PRD. 2.
- PVEM. 2.
- PT. 1.

== Voter turnout ==
The voter turnout was considered relatively high at 52%
