= List of parties contesting the 2010 United Kingdom general election =

A large number of parties stood candidates in the 2010 general election.

== Parties standing in England and Wales ==
There are 573 seats in England and Wales; the Labour Party, Conservative Party and Liberal Democrats contested every seat, except in the constituency of the Speaker. The UK Independence Party, Green Party of England and Wales and British National Party also contested a large number of seats, while Plaid Cymru stood in every seat in Wales.

Parties that won seats in 2005

- Labour Party (572 candidates in 2010, includes 36 Labour Co-operative candidates)
- Conservative Party (572)
- Liberal Democrats (572)
- Plaid Cymru (40)
- Respect - The Unity Coalition (10)
- Independent Kidderminster Hospital and Health Concern (1)
- Speaker (1)

Other parties

- United Kingdom Independence Party (539 candidates in 2010)
- British National Party (325)
- Green Party of England and Wales (310)
- English Democrats Party (106)
- Christian Party (70)
- Trade Unionist and Socialist Coalition (31)
- Official Monster Raving Loony Party (27)
- Socialist Labour Party (19)
- National Front (17)
- Christian Peoples Alliance (11)
- Pirate Party UK (9)
- Workers' Revolutionary Party (7)
- Alliance for Green Socialism (6)
- Mebyon Kernow (6)
- Communist Party of Britain (5)
- Animal Protection Party (4)
- Citizens for Undead Rights and Equality (4)
- Independents Federation UK (4)
- Liberal Party (4)
- Impact Party (3)
- Lincolnshire Independents (3)
- Magna Carta Party (3)
- Peace Party (3)
- Your Right to Democracy Party Ltd (3)
- Best of a Bad Bunch (2)
- Christian Movement for Great Britain (2)
- Common Sense Party (2)
- Democratic Nationalists (2)
- Equal Parenting Alliance (2)
- Residents' Association (2)
- Scrap Members Allowances (2)
- Social Democratic Party (2)
- Socialist Equality Party (2)
- UK Libertarian Party (2)
- You Party (2)
- Alliance for Workers' Liberty (1)
- All The South Party (1)
- Animals Count (1)
- Apolitical Democrats (1)
- A Vote Against MP Expense Abuse (1)
- Basingstoke Common Man (1)
- Battersea Party (1)
- Better Britain Party (1)
- Blaenau Voice (1)
- Blue Environment Party (1)
- Bromsgrove Independent Conservative (1)
- Bus-Pass Elvis Party (1)
- Campaign for Independent Politicians (1)
- City Independents (1)
- Clause 28 Children's Protection Christian Democrats (1)
- Common Good (1)
- Communist League (1)
- Cornish Democrats (1)
- Democratic Labour Party (1)
- Direct Democracy (Communist) Party (1)
- English Independence Party (1)
- Fancy Dress Party (1)
- Fight for an Anti-War Government (1)
- Freedom and Responsibility (1)
- Get Snouts Out The Trough (1)
- Humanity (1)
- Independent Ealing Acton Communities Public Services (1)
- Independent English Delegate (1)
- Independent Leave-The-EU Alliance (1)
- Independent People Together (1)
- Independent Save Our Green Belt (1)
- Independent Voice for Halifax (1)
- Integrity UK (1)
- Islam Zinda Baad Platform (1)
- Justice & Anti-Corruption Party (1)
- Justice Party (1)
- Lawfulness Trustworthiness and Transparency (1)
- Lewisham People Before Profit (1)
- Local Liberals Before Politics Party (1)
- The Macclesfield Independent (1)
- Mansfield Independent Forum (1)
- Medway Independent Party (1)
- Middle England Party (1)
- Money Reform Party (1)
- Movement for Active Democracy (1)
- National Democrats (1)
- Nationwide Reform Party (1)
- New Independent Conservative Chelsea and Fulham (1)
- New Party (1)
- Nobody Party (1)
- No Candidate Deserves My Vote! (1)
- Northampton - Save Our Public Services (1)
- People's National Democratic Party (1)
- Peoples Party Essex (1)
- Radical Reform Group (1)
- Reduce Tax On Beer (1)
- Reform 2000 Party (1)
- Restoration Party (1)
- Save King George Hospital (1)
- Save Queen Mary's Hospital (1)
- Science Party (1)
- Socialist Party of Great Britain (1)
- Staffordshire Independent Group (1)
- Tamsin Omond To The Commons (1)
- Tendring First (1)
- True English (Poetry) Party (1)
- Trust (1)
- United Voice (1)
- Unity for Peace and Socialism (1)
- Virtue Currency Cognitive Appraisal Party (1)
- Wessex Regionalist Party (1)
- Workers' Power (1)
- Youth Party (1)

== Parties standing in Northern Ireland ==
There are eighteen seats in Northern Ireland. The Social Democratic and Labour Party and Alliance Party of Northern Ireland stood in every one. The Ulster Conservatives and Unionists - New Force stood aside only against an independent in Fermanagh and South Tyrone, the Democratic Unionist Party against independents both there and in North Down. Sinn Féin stood aside only against the SDLP in Belfast South. Traditional Unionist Voice stood in the majority of seats. The other parties which stood are the Green Party in Northern Ireland and People Before Profit Alliance.

Parties that won seats in 2005

- Democratic Unionist Party (16)
- Sinn Féin (17)
- Social Democratic and Labour Party (18)
- Ulster Conservatives and Unionists - New Force (17)

Other parties

- Alliance Party of Northern Ireland (18)
- Traditional Unionist Voice (10)
- Green Party in Northern Ireland (4)
- People Before Profit Alliance (1)

== Parties standing in Scotland ==
There are fifty-nine seats in Scotland. The Scottish National Party, Labour Party, Conservative Party and Liberal Democrats stood in every one.

Parties that won seats in 2005

- Labour Party (59 candidates in 2010, includes 6 Labour Co-operative candidates)
- Liberal Democrats (59)
- Scottish National Party (59)
- Conservative and Unionist Party (59)

Other parties

- United Kingdom Independence Party (34 candidates in 2010)
- Scottish Green Party (20)
- British National Party (13)
- Scottish Socialist Party (10)
- Trade Unionist and Socialist Coalition (10)
- Socialist Labour Party (5)
- Scottish Jacobite Party (2)
- Communist League (1)
- Communist Party of Britain (1)
- Joy of Talk (1)
- Land is Power (1)
- Liberal Party (1)
- Pirate Party UK (1)
- Scotland Against Crooked Lawyers (1)
- Scottish Christian Party (1)
- Trust (1)

== See also ==
- List of parties contesting the United Kingdom general election, 2005
