= Opinion polling for the 2005 United Kingdom general election =

Opinion polling for the 2005 United Kingdom general election was carried out by various organisations to gauge voting intention. Most of the polling companies listed are members of the British Polling Council (BPC) and abide by its disclosure rules. The opinion polls listed range from the previous election on 7 June 2001 to the election on 5 May 2005.

== Guide to tables ==
Poll results are listed in the tables below in reverse chronological order. The highest percentage figure in each poll is displayed in bold, and its background is shaded in the leading party's colour. The "lead" column shows the percentage point difference between the two parties with the highest figures. When a poll result is a tie, the figures with the highest percentages are shaded and displayed in bold.

== National poll results ==
Most national opinion polls do not cover Northern Ireland, which has different major political parties from the rest of the United Kingdom. The detailed results of parties in the 'others' column can sometimes be found under 'show'.

=== 2005 ===
Date(s) conducted	Pollster	Client	Sample size	Lab	Con	LD	Others	Lead
5 May 2005	2005 general election		–	**36.2%**	33.2%	22.7%	7.9%	3.0
3–4 May	Ipsos MORI	Evening Standard	1,164	**38%**	33%	23%	6%	5
3–4 May	YouGov	The Daily Telegraph	Unknown	**37%**	32%	24%	7%	5
1–4 May	Harris	N/A	Unknown	**39%**	33%	22%	6%	6
2–3 May	YouGov	Sky News	Unknown	**36%**	32%	25%	6%	4
2–3 May	Populus	The Times	1,174	**38%**	32%	21%	8%	6
1–3 May	NOP	The Independent	Unknown	**36%**	33%	23%	8%	3
1–3 May	ICM	The Guardian	1,178	**38%**	32%	22%	8%	6
1–2 May	Harris	N/A	Unknown	**38%**	34%	22%	6%	4
29 Apr – 2 May	Populus	The Times/ITV	866	**41%**	27%	23%	9%	14
29 Apr – 1 May	YouGov	The Daily Telegraph	Unknown	**36%**	33%	24%	7%	3
29 Apr – 1 May	MORI	Financial Times	Unknown	**39%**	29%	22%	10%	10
28 Apr – 1 May	Populus	The Times/ITV	Unknown	**41%**	29%	21%	9%	12
28–30 Apr	YouGov	The Sunday Times	Unknown	**36%**	33%	23%	8%	3
28–30 Apr	BPIX	Mail on Sunday	Unknown	**38%**	31%	22%	9%	7
27–30 Apr	Populus	The Times/ITV	863	**42%**	29%	21%	8%	13
28–29 Apr	MORI	Sunday Mirror/The Observer	Unknown	**36%**	33%	22%	9%	3
27–29 Apr	ICM	The Sunday Telegraph	Unknown	**39%**	31%	22%	8%	8
26–29 Apr	Populus	The Times/ITV	Unknown	**40%**	31%	21%	8%	9
26–28 Apr	YouGov	The Daily Telegraph	Unknown	**36%**	32%	24%	8%	4
25–28 Apr	Populus	The Times/ITV	853	**40%**	31%	22%	7%	9
23–28 Apr	ComRes	Independent on Sunday	Unknown	**39%**	31%	23%	7%	8
24–27 Apr	Populus	The Times/ITV	841	**40%**	31%	21%	8%	9
24–26 Apr	ICM	The Guardian	1,209	**40%**	32%	21%	5%	8
23–26 Apr	Populus	The Times/ITV	835	**40%**	31%	21%	8%	9
22–25 Apr	Populus	The Times	831	**40%**	31%	21%	8%	9
21–25 Apr	MORI	Financial Times	Unknown	**36%**	34%	23%	7%	2
22–24 Apr	YouGov	The Daily Telegraph	Unknown	**37%**	33%	24%	6%	4
22–24 Apr	NOP	The Independent	Unknown	**40%**	30%	21%	9%	10
21–24 Apr	Populus	The Times	819	**41%**	33%	19%	7%	8
23 Apr	ICM	Daily Mail/GMTV	Unknown	**39%**	33%	20%	8%	6
21–23 Apr	YouGov	The Sunday Times	Unknown	**37%**	33%	23%	7%	4
20–23 Apr	Populus	The Times	798	**41%**	32%	20%	7%	9
21–22 Apr	BPIX	Mail on Sunday	Unknown	**36%**	33%	22%	9%	3
20–22 Apr	ICM	The Sunday Telegraph	Unknown	**39%**	33%	21%	7%	6
19–22 Apr	ComRes	Independent on Sunday	Unknown	**40%**	35%	18%	7%	5
19–22 Apr	Populus Online	The Times Online/ITV	798	**41%**	33%	20%	6%	8
19–21 Apr	YouGov	The Daily Telegraph	Unknown	**37%**	34%	22%	7%	4
18–21 Apr	Populus	The Times/ITV	806	**40%**	33%	20%	7%	7
17–20 Apr	Populus	The Times/ITV	836	**39%**	34%	20%	7%	5
18–19 Apr	MORI	The Sun	Unknown	**39%**	32%	22%	7%	7
17–19 Apr	ICM	The Guardian	1,163	**39%**	33%	22%	7%	6
16–19 Apr	Populus	The Times	863	**39%**	33%	21%	7%	6
15–18 Apr	Populus	The Times/ITV	Unknown	**39%**	33%	21%	7%	6
15–18 Apr	MORI	Financial Times	Unknown	**40%**	32%	21%	7%	8
15–17 Apr	NOP	The Independent	Unknown	**37%**	32%	21%	10%	5
15–17 Apr	YouGov	The Daily Telegraph	Unknown	**36%**	33%	23%	8%	3
14–17 Apr	Populus	The Times	586	**40%**	31%	21%	8%	9
16 Apr	ICM	Daily Mail/GMTV	Unknown	**41%**	33%	20%	6%	8
14–16 Apr	YouGov	The Sunday Times	Unknown	**36%**	35%	23%	6%	1
14–15 Apr	BPIX	Mail on Sunday	Unknown	**36%**	33%	22%	9%	3
13–15 Apr	ICM	The Sunday Telegraph	Unknown	**40%**	30%	22%	8%	10
11–15 Apr	ComRes	Independent on Sunday	Unknown	**40%**	34%	20%	6%	6
12–14 Apr	YouGov	The Daily Telegraph	Unknown	**38%**	33%	22%	7%	5
10–12 Apr	ICM	The Guardian	1,169	**39%**	33%	22%	7%	6
11 Apr	Dissolution of Parliament and the official start of the election campaign							
7–11 Apr	MORI	Evening Standard	Unknown	**39%**	35%	21%	5%	4
8–10 Apr	NOP	The Independent	Unknown	**38%**	32%	21%	9%	6
8–10 Apr	YouGov	The Daily Telegraph	Unknown	**36%**	**36%**	20%	8%	Tie
9 Apr	ICM	Daily Mail/GMTV	Unknown	**38%**	33%	22%	7%	5
8–9 Apr (Note: Projected date by PollBase; exact fieldwork dates not provided.)	BPIX	Mail on Sunday	Unknown	**37%**	34%	22%	7%	3
7–9 Apr	YouGov	The Sunday Times	Unknown	**37%**	35%	21%	7%	2
7–9 Apr	MORI	The Observer/Sunday Mirror	Unknown	**40%**	33%	19%	8%	7
7–8 Apr	ICM	The Sunday Telegraph	Unknown	**38%**	34%	20%	8%	4
5–6 Apr	YouGov	The Daily Telegraph	Unknown	**36%**	35%	21%	8%	1
5 Apr	YouGov	Sky News	Unknown	**36%**	**36%**	21%	7%	Tie
1–3 Apr	NOP	The Independent	Unknown	**36%**	33%	21%	10%	3
1–3 Apr	ICM	The Guardian	973	**37%**	34%	21%	8%	3
1–3 Apr	Populus	The Times	812	**37%**	35%	19%	9%	2
1–3 Apr	MORI	Financial Times	Unknown	34%	**39%**	21%	6%	5
30 Mar	YouGov	The Sunday Times	Unknown	**36%**	34%	22%	8%	2
24–25 Mar	ComRes	Independent on Sunday	Unknown	**40%**	34%	16%	10%	6
21–24 Mar	YouGov	The Daily Telegraph	Unknown	**35%**	34%	22%	9%	1
22–23 Mar	ComRes	Independent on Sunday	Unknown	**43%**	31%	17%	9%	12
17–22 Mar	MORI	Financial Times	Unknown	**37%**	**37%**	20%	6%	Tie
18–20 Mar	ICM	The Guardian	716	**40%**	32%	20%	7%	8
17–19 Mar	YouGov	The Sunday Times	Unknown	**37%**	32%	23%	8%	5
11–13 Mar	NOP	The Independent	Unknown	**39%**	34%	19%	8%	5
4–6 Mar	Populus	The Times	831	**39%**	32%	20%	9%	7
23–24 Feb	ComRes	Independent on Sunday	Unknown	**41%**	34%	17%	8%	7
22–24 Feb	YouGov	The Daily Telegraph	Unknown	**38%**	32%	21%	9%	6
17–21 Feb	MORI	Financial Times	Unknown	**39%**	37%	18%	6%	2
18–20 Feb	ICM	The Guardian	1,013	**37%**	34%	21%	8%	3
11–13 Feb	NOP	The Independent	Unknown	**42%**	30%	18%	10%	12
4–6 Feb	Populus	The Times	814	**41%**	32%	18%	9%	9
3–5 Feb	YouGov	Mail on Sunday	Unknown	**34%**	33%	23%	10%	1
26–28 Jan	YouGov	The Daily Telegraph	Unknown	**35%**	33%	23%	9%	2
26–27 Jan	ICM	The Sunday Telegraph	Unknown	**37%**	32%	21%	10%	5
26–27 Jan	ComRes	Independent on Sunday	Unknown	**40%**	32%	20%	8%	8
25–27 Jan	YouGov	The Daily Telegraph	Unknown	**35%**	34%	22%	9%	1
20–24 Jan	MORI	The Observer	Unknown	**38%**	32%	22%	8%	6
21–23 Jan	ICM	The Guardian	1,000	**38%**	31%	21%	9%	6
20–22 Jan	YouGov	The Sunday Times	Unknown	**34%**	31%	25%	10%	3
7–9 Jan	NOP	The Independent	Unknown	**38%**	32%	21%	9%	6
7–9 Jan	Populus	The Times	848	**38%**	33%	20%	9%	5
5–6 Jan	ICM	News of the World	Unknown	**38%**	31%	21%	10%	7
2–6 Jan	MORI	N/A	Unknown	**35%**	30%	26%	9%	5

=== 2004 ===
Date(s) conducted	Pollster	Client	Sample size	Lab	Con	LD	Others	Lead
16–19 Dec	ICM	The Guardian	1,002	**40%**	31%	21%	7%	9
16–18 Dec	YouGov	The Sunday Times	Unknown	**35%**	32%	23%	10%	3
14–16 Dec	ComRes	Independent on Sunday	Unknown	**39%**	34%	19%	8%	5
14–16 Dec	YouGov	The Daily Telegraph	Unknown	**35%**	32%	21%	12%	3
2–6 Dec	MORI	–	Unknown	**40%**	27%	24%	9%	13
3–5 Dec	Populus	The Times	826	**37%**	33%	20%	10%	4
24–25 Nov	ComRes	Independent on Sunday	Unknown	**42%**	31%	20%	7%	11
23–25 Nov	YouGov	The Daily Telegraph	Unknown	**35%**	32%	23%	10%	3
12–14 Nov	NOP	The Independent	Unknown	**39%**	30%	20%	11%	9
12–14 Nov	ICM	The Guardian	830	**38%**	30%	22%	10%	8
4–8 Nov	MORI	–	Unknown	**35%**	31%	23%	11%	4
5–7 Nov	Populus	The Times	Unknown	**34%**	33%	22%	11%	1
27–28 Oct	ICM	The Guardian	Unknown	**39%**	33%	17%	11%	6
26–27 Oct	YouGov	The Daily Telegraph	Unknown	**36%**	32%	22%	10%	4
21–27 Oct	MORI	–	Unknown	**39%**	29%	22%	10%	10
22–24 Oct	ICM	The Guardian	1,011	**37%**	31%	23%	9%	6
6–7 Oct	ICM	The Daily Telegraph	Unknown	**39%**	30%	23%	8%	9
6 Oct	NOP	Independent on Sunday	Unknown	**36%**	34%	21%	9%	2
1–2 Oct	YouGov	Mail on Sunday	Unknown	**35%**	29%	22%	14%	6
30 Sep – 2 Oct	Populus	The Times	Unknown	**35%**	28%	25%	12%	7
30 Sep	Hartlepool by-election (Lab hold)							
23–24 Sep	Populus	News of the World	Unknown	28%	**32%**	29%	11%	4
23–24 Sep	ComRes	Independent on Sunday	Unknown	**32%**	30%	27%	11%	2
21–23 Sep	YouGov	The Daily Telegraph	2,033	**36%**	34%	21%	9%	2
19 Sep	ICM	New Frontiers	Unknown	**33%**	31%	25%	11%	2
17–19 Sep	ICM	The Guardian	1,005	**36%**	32%	22%	10%	4
10–14 Sep	MORI	The Observer	Unknown	32%	**33%**	25%	10%	1
2–5 Sep	Populus	The Times	608	**31%**	30%	26%	13%	1
24–26 Aug	YouGov	The Daily Telegraph	Unknown	**34%**	**34%**	21%	11%	Tie
12–16 Aug	MORI	Financial Times	Unknown	**36%**	32%	21%	11%	4
13–15 Aug	ICM	The Guardian	1,005	**36%**	33%	22%	9%	3
30 Jul – 1 Aug	Populus	The Times	570	**32%**	**32%**	24%	12%	Tie
26–28 Jul	YouGov	The Daily Telegraph	Unknown	**34%**	33%	23%	10%	1
22–27 Jul	MORI	Independent on Sunday	Unknown	**32%**	31%	24%	13%	1
21–23 Jul	Populus	News of the World	Unknown	**30%**	28%	28%	14%	2
16–18 Jul	ICM	The Guardian	1,007	**35%**	30%	25%	10%	5
16–17 Jul	YouGov	The Sunday Times	Unknown	**33%**	**33%**	22%	12%	Tie
16 Jul	NOP	Sunday Express	Unknown	**37%**	26%	24%	13%	11
15 Jul	Birmingham Hodge Hill by-election (Lab hold) and Leicester South by-election (LD gain from Lab)							
2–3 Jul	Populus	The Times	556	**33%**	29%	24%	14%	4
24–29 Jun	MORI	–	Unknown	31%	**34%**	19%	16%	3
22–24 Jun	YouGov	The Daily Telegraph	Unknown	33%	**34%**	21%	12%	1
18–20 Jun	Ipsos MORI	Financial Times	966	**32%**	27%	22%	19%	5
11–13 Jun	ICM	The Guardian	1,009	**34%**	31%	22%	13%	3
10 Jun	European Parliament election; local elections in England and Wales							
8–10 Jun	YouGov	Mail on Sunday	Unknown	32%	**36%**	18%	14%	4
4–6 Jun	Populus	The Times	589	**31%**	29%	22%	18%	2
2–4 Jun	YouGov	The Daily Telegraph	Unknown	**35%**	**35%**	17%	13%	Tie
27 May – 1 Jun	MORI	Financial Times	Unknown	**35%**	34%	18%	13%	1
25–27 May	YouGov	The Daily Telegraph	Unknown	33%	**34%**	21%	12%	1
20–23 May	ICM	The Guardian	1,001	**37%**	33%	21%	9%	4
20–21 May	YouGov	The Daily Telegraph	Unknown	33%	**36%**	19%	12%	3
13–15 May	YouGov	The Sunday Times	Unknown	34%	**37%**	20%	9%	3
7–9 May	Populus	The Times	578	32%	**36%**	22%	10%	4
6–8 May	YouGov	Mail on Sunday	Unknown	36%	**40%**	18%	6%	4
27–29 Apr	YouGov	The Daily Telegraph	Unknown	35%	**39%**	19%	7%	4
15–19 Apr	MORI	–	Unknown	**36%**	34%	22%	8%	2
16–18 Apr	ICM	The Guardian	1,002	**38%**	33%	22%	6%	5
2–4 Apr	Populus	The Times	Unknown	**34%**	**34%**	22%	10%	Tie
1 Apr	YouGov	Mail on Sunday	Unknown	35%	**38%**	20%	7%	3
23–25 Mar	YouGov	The Daily Telegraph	Unknown	34%	**39%**	20%	7%	5
11–16 Mar	MORI	–	Unknown	**35%**	**35%**	23%	7%	Tie
10–11 Mar	ICM	The Guardian	1,014	**37%**	35%	21%	7%	2
5–7 Mar	Populus	The Times	573	**36%**	34%	22%	8%	2
24–26 Feb	YouGov	The Daily Telegraph	Unknown	34%	**39%**	21%	6%	5
20–22 Feb (Note: ICM gives 16–22 Feb; university spreadsheet shows 20–22 Feb.)	ICM	The Guardian	1,006	**36%**	34%	21%	8%	2
12–16 Feb	MORI	Financial Times	Unknown	**36%**	35%	21%	8%	1
6–8 Feb	Populus	The Times	580	**36%**	31%	25%	8%	5
4–5 Feb	ICM	News of the World	Unknown	**34%**	**34%**	24%	8%	Tie
4–5 Feb	NOP	The Independent	Unknown	35%	**36%**	24%	5%	1
29 Jan	YouGov	The Daily Telegraph	Unknown	36%	**39%**	19%	6%	3
20–22 Jan	YouGov	The Daily Telegraph	Unknown	35%	**40%**	19%	6%	5
15–20 Jan	MORI	–	Unknown	**37%**	35%	21%	7%	2
16–18 Jan	ICM	The Guardian	1,007	**39%**	34%	20%	7%	5
2–4 Jan	Populus	The Times	566	**40%**	35%	18%	7%	5

=== 2003 ===
Date(s) conducted	Pollster	Client	Sample size	Lab	Con	LD	Others	Lead
16–17 Dec	YouGov	The Daily Telegraph	Unknown	38%	**39%**	18%	5%	1
11–17 Dec	MORI	Financial Times	Unknown	**40%**	31%	22%	7%	9
12–14 Dec	ICM	The Guardian	1,001	**38%**	33%	21%	8%	5
5–7 Dec	Populus	The Times	557	**35%**	33%	22%	10%	2
5–6 Dec	YouGov	Mail on Sunday	Unknown	**36%**	**36%**	23%	5%	Tie
26 Nov	Northern Ireland Assembly election							
25–27 Nov	YouGov	The Daily Telegraph	Unknown	36%	**38%**	19%	7%	2
20–25 Nov	MORI	–	Unknown	**36%**	35%	22%	7%	1
14–16 Nov	ICM	The Guardian	1,002	**38%**	33%	21%	8%	5
13–14 Nov	YouGov	The Sunday Times	Unknown	**39%**	36%	20%	5%	3
7–9 Nov	Populus	The Times	554	**35%**	31%	24%	10%	4
7–8 Nov	YouGov	Mail on Sunday	Unknown	**36%**	34%	24%	6%	2
6 Nov	Michael Howard becomes leader of the Conservative Party							
6 Nov	ICM	News of the World	Unknown	**39%**	31%	22%	8%	8
31 Oct – 1 Nov	MORI	The Independent	Unknown	**38%**	32%	25%	5%	6
30–31 Oct	YouGov	The Daily Telegraph	Unknown	**36%**	34%	23%	7%	2
29 Oct	Iain Duncan Smith loses a vote of confidence on his leadership of the Conservative Party							
23–28 Oct	MORI	Financial Times	Unknown	**38%**	35%	21%	6%	3
17–19 Oct	ICM	The Guardian	1,004	**38%**	33%	21%	8%	5
16–18 Oct	YouGov	Mail on Sunday	Unknown	**34%**	**34%**	25%	7%	Tie
10–11 Oct	YouGov	Mail on Sunday	Unknown	33%	**38%**	22%	7%	5
3–5 Oct	Populus	The Times	524	**36%**	28%	27%	9%	8
2–3 Oct	YouGov	Mail on Sunday	Unknown	**34%**	33%	26%	7%	1
30 Sep – 2 Oct	YouGov	The Daily Telegraph/Sky News	Unknown	**33%**	**33%**	28%	6%	Tie
26–28 Sep	NOP	The Independent	Unknown	**38%**	29%	27%	6%	9
25–26 Sep	YouGov	The Sunday Times	Unknown	**33%**	30%	30%	7%	3
24–26 Sep	ICM	News of the World	Unknown	**31%**	**31%**	**31%**	7%	Tie
23–25 Sep	YouGov	The Daily Telegraph	2,306	31%	**32%**	30%	7%	1
19–21 Sep	ICM	The Guardian	1,002	**35%**	30%	28%	8%	5
18 Sep	Brent East by-election (LD gain from Lab)							
11–16 Sep	MORI	Financial Times	Unknown	**40%**	31%	21%	8%	9
5–6 Sep	Populus	The Times	511	**37%**	35%	20%	8%	2
4–5 Sep	YouGov	Mail on Sunday	Unknown	36%	**37%**	19%	8%	1
28 Aug – 2 Sep	MORI	Financial Times	Unknown	**36%**	34%	24%	6%	2
26–28 Aug	YouGov	The Daily Telegraph	Unknown	35%	**37%**	20%	8%	2
15–17 Aug	ICM	The Guardian	1,001	**37%**	32%	22%	9%	5
7–8 Aug	YouGov	Mail on Sunday	Unknown	34%	**38%**	21%	7%	4
1–3 Aug	Populus	The Times	564	**35%**	33%	25%	7%	2
22–24 Jul	YouGov	The Daily Telegraph	2,219	34%	**37%**	22%	7%	3
17–22 Jul	MORI	–	Unknown	35%	**38%**	21%	6%	3
18–20 Jul	ICM	The Guardian	1,003	**36%**	34%	22%	9%	2
7–8 Jul	MORI	The Sun	Unknown	**38%**	35%	19%	8%	3
4–6 Jul	Populus	The Times	Unknown	**36%**	34%	21%	9%	2
26–27 Jun	MORI	News of the World	Unknown	**35%**	**35%**	19%	11%	Tie
24–26 Jun	YouGov	The Daily Telegraph	Unknown	35%	**37%**	21%	7%	2
19–24 Jun	MORI	–	Unknown	**41%**	32%	19%	8%	9
20–22 Jun	ICM	The Guardian	1,001	**38%**	34%	21%	7%	4
19–20 Jun	YouGov	Mail on Sunday	Unknown	**37%**	36%	20%	7%	1
13–15 Jun	Populus	The Times	513	**36%**	34%	21%	9%	2
28–29 May	YouGov	The Daily Telegraph	Unknown	**37%**	36%	20%	7%	1
22–28 May	MORI	–	Unknown	**39%**	31%	22%	8%	8
16–18 May	ICM	The Guardian	1,000	**42%**	29%	21%	8%	13
2–4 May	Populus	The Times	565	**35%**	34%	23%	8%	1
1 May	Scottish Parliament election; National Assembly for Wales election; local elections in England and Scotland							
24–28 Apr	MORI	–	Unknown	**43%**	29%	21%	7%	14
22–24 Apr	YouGov	The Daily Telegraph	2,390	**40%**	32%	21%	7%	8
17–19 Apr	ICM	The Guardian	1,000	**42%**	30%	21%	7%	12
10–12 Apr	Populus	The Times	Unknown	**41%**	29%	22%	8%	12
10–11 Apr	YouGov	Mail on Sunday	Unknown	**41%**	33%	18%	8%	8
26–27 Mar	YouGov	The Daily Telegraph	2,282	**40%**	33%	20%	7%	7
20–24 Mar	MORI	–	Unknown	**43%**	29%	21%	7%	14
20 Mar	The Iraq War begins							
14–16 Mar	ICM	The Guardian	1,002	**38%**	32%	24%	6%	6
10–12 Mar	Populus	The Times	540	**42%**	29%	22%	7%	13
7–9 Mar	Populus	The Times	498	**34%**	**34%**	24%	8%	Tie
25–26 Feb	YouGov	The Daily Telegraph	Unknown	**35%**	31%	26%	8%	4
20–25 Feb	MORI	Financial Times	Unknown	**41%**	29%	22%	8%	12
20–21 Feb	YouGov	The Sunday Times	Unknown	**35%**	33%	25%	7%	2
17–18 Feb	YouGov	The Daily Telegraph	Unknown	**34%**	33%	26%	7%	1
14–16 Feb	ICM	The Guardian	1,003	**39%**	31%	22%	8%	8
7–9 Feb	Populus	The Times	555	**35%**	34%	25%	6%	1
7–8 Feb	YouGov	Mail on Sunday	Unknown	**37%**	32%	24%	7%	5
28–30 Jan	YouGov	The Daily Telegraph	1,949	**36%**	32%	24%	8%	4
23–27 Jan	MORI	–	Unknown	**40%**	31%	22%	7%	9
23–24 Jan	YouGov	The Sunday Times	Unknown	**37%**	31%	24%	8%	6
17–19 Jan	ICM	The Guardian	1,002	**43%**	30%	21%	6%	13
16–17 Jan	YouGov	Mail on Sunday	Unknown	**37%**	31%	25%	7%	6
3–5 Jan	Populus	The Times	565	**38%**	31%	25%	6%	7
3–4 Jan	YouGov	Mail on Sunday	Unknown	**38%**	31%	23%	8%	7
3–4 Jan	Live St	The Times	Unknown	**37%**	32%	25%	6%	5

=== 2002 ===
Date(s) conducted	Pollster	Client	Sample size	Lab	Con	LD	Others	Lead
19–20 Dec	YouGov	The Sunday Times	Unknown	39%	32%	21%	8%	7
12–17 Dec	MORI	Financial Times	Unknown	37%	33%	24%	6%	4
13–15 Dec	ICM	The Guardian	1,006	41%	27%	23%	8%	14
5–6 Dec	YouGov	Mail on Sunday	Unknown	38%	31%	23%	8%	7
28–29 Nov	YouGov	Mail on Sunday	Unknown	40%	31%	21%	8%	9
20–22 Nov	YouGov	The Sunday Times	Unknown	39%	30%	23%	8%	9
14–19 Nov	MORI	Financial Times	Unknown	42%	30%	21%	7%	12
15–17 Nov	ICM	The Guardian	1,000	42%	29%	22%	7%	13
14–16 Nov	YouGov	The Sunday Times	Unknown	41%	31%	21%	7%	10
6–7 Nov	ICM	The Sunday Telegraph	Unknown	43%	29%	21%	7%	14
31 Oct – 1 Nov	YouGov	Mail on Sunday	Unknown	40%	31%	21%	8%	9
23–25 Oct	YouGov	The Sunday Times	Unknown	40%	31%	22%	7%	9
17–21 Oct	MORI	–	Unknown	57%	25%	13%	5%	32
18–20 Oct	ICM	The Guardian	1,001	43%	32%	20%	6%	11
11–13 Oct	Populus	The Times	1,001	42%	30%	21%	6%	12
11–12 Oct	YouGov	Mail on Sunday	Unknown	40%	33%	20%	7%	7
2–3 Oct	ICM	News of the World	1,013	42%	27%	23%	8%	15
1–3 Oct	YouGov	The Daily Telegraph	Unknown	40%	31%	22%	7%	9
27–30 Sep	NOP	The Daily Telegraph	Unknown	41%	28%	21%	10%	13
25–27 Sep	YouGov	The Sunday Times	Unknown	40%	32%	22%	6%	8
19–24 Sep	MORI	–	Unknown	53%	27%	15%	5%	26
20–22 Sep	ICM	The Guardian	1,000	39%	34%	20%	7%	5
5–7 Sep	Populus	The Times	610	39%	33%	21%	6%	6
29–30 Aug	YouGov	The Sunday Times	Unknown	39%	33%	21%	7%	6
22–28 Aug	MORI	–	Unknown	53%	25%	16%	6%	28
23–25 Aug	ICM	The Guardian	1,003	41%	32%	21%	6%	9
21–23 Aug	YouGov	The Sunday Times	Unknown	40%	33%	20%	7%	7
1–2 Aug	YouGov	Mail on Sunday	Unknown	40%	34%	20%	6%	6
26–27 Jul	ICM	The Guardian	1,002	42%	33%	20%	4%	9
25–26 Jul	YouGov	The Sunday Times	–	40%	34%	20%	6%	6
18–22 Jul	MORI	–	1,781	48%	27%	18%	7%	21
4–5 Jul	YouGov	Mail on Sunday	Unknown	39%	34%	20%	7%	5
21–24 Jun	NOP	The Daily Telegraph	1,010	41%	31%	19%	9%	10
20–24 Jun	MORI	The Times	1,980	48%	29%	17%	6%	19
21–23 Jun	ICM	The Guardian	1,002	42%	32%	20%	7%	10
21 Jun	YouGov	The Sunday Times	Unknown	38%	35%	20%	7%	3
17–19 Jun	YouGov	The Sunday Times	Unknown	39%	33%	20%	8%	6
7–8 Jun	YouGov	The Sunday Times	Unknown	39%	33%	21%	7%	6
29–31 May	YouGov	The Sunday Times	Unknown	40%	32%	20%	8%	12
23–28 May	MORI	–	1,899	46%	30%	17%	7%	16
23–24 May	YouGov	The Sunday Times	Unknown	40%	32%	21%	7%	12
17–19 May	ICM	The Guardian	1,003	42%	34%	19%	5%	8
Early May	ICM	–	Unknown	41%	35%	20%	4%	6
2 May	Local elections in England							
24–26 Apr	YouGov	The Sunday Times	Unknown	44%	32%	18%	6%	12
18–22 Apr	MORI	–	1,912	50%	27%	16%	7%	23
20–21 Apr	ICM	The Guardian	1,000	45%	29%	18%	8%	16
18–19 Apr	ICM	The Sunday Telegraph	Unknown	45%	32%	17%	6%	13
21–26 Mar	MORI	–	1,915	47%	28%	19%	6%	19
15–17 Mar	ICM	The Guardian	1,001	43%	34%	17%	6%	9
5–7 Mar	YouGov	Mail on Sunday	Unknown	42%	31%	20%	7%	11
21–26 Feb	MORI	The Times	1,965	51%	28%	16%	5%	23
15–17 Feb	ICM	The Guardian	1,003	47%	30%	18%	5%	17
14 Feb	Ogmore by-election (Lab hold)							
24–28 Jan	MORI	The Times	1,955	42%	30%	21%	7%	12
18–20 Jan	ICM	The Guardian	1,003	45%	30%	19%	6%	15
11–12 Jan	YouGov	Mail on Sunday	Unknown	42%	30%	21%	7%	12

=== 2001 ===
Date(s) conducted	Pollster	Client	Sample size	Lab	Con	LD	Others	Lead
14–16 Dec	ICM	The Guardian	1,000	44%	29%	20%	7%	15
22–27 Nov	MORI	The Times	1,985	56%	25%	15%	4%	31
22 Nov	Ipswich by-election (Lab hold)							
16–18 Nov	ICM	The Guardian	1,004	46%	29%	19%	6%	17
18–22 Oct	MORI	The Times	1,950	57%	25%	13%	5%	32
19–20 Oct	ICM	The Guardian	1,000	47%	29%	19%	5%	18
20–25 Sep	MORI	The Times	1,958	53%	27%	15%	5%	26
14–16 Sep	ICM	The Guardian	1,007	46%	29%	20%	5%	17
13 Sep	Iain Duncan Smith is elected leader of the Conservative Party							
23–28 Aug	MORI	The Times	1,840	53%	25%	16%	6%	28
17–19 Aug	ICM	The Guardian	1,004	46%	30%	17%	7%	16
9–14 Aug	MORI	GMB	Unknown	53%	23%	19%	5%	30
20 Jul – 5 Aug	ICM	BBC Radio 4	Unknown	53%	29%	14%	4%	24
19–23 Jul	MORI	The Times	2,084	52%	25%	17%	6%	27
13–14 Jul	ICM	The Guardian	1,001	46%	30%	18%	6%	16
21–26 Jun	MORI	The Times	1,999	49%	25%	19%	6%	24
7 Jun 2001	2001 general election		–	42.0%	32.7%	18.8%	6.5%	9.3

== Exit poll ==
An exit poll conducted by MORI and NOP for the BBC and ITV was published at the end of voting at 22:00, predicting the number of seats and vote share for each party.

Parties	Seats	Change (Note: Changes based on notional 2001 results.)	Vote share	Change
Labour Party	356	▼47	37%	▼3.7%
Conservative Party	209	▲44	33%	▲1.3%
Liberal Democrats	53	▲2	22%	▲3.7%
Others (Note: This includes the 18 seats in Northern Ireland and 1 other in Great Britain.)	28	▲1	8%	▼1.3%
	Labour majority of 66		Labour lead of 4%	

== Sub-national poll results ==
=== Scotland ===
Date(s) conducted	Pollster	Client	Sample size	Lab	SNP	LD	Con	Others	Lead
5 May 2005	2005 general election		–	39.5%	17.7%	22.6%	15.8%	4.4%	16.9
31 Mar – 7 Apr 2005	TNS System 3	SNP	992	45%	23%	14%	14%	4%	18
24 Jan – 5 Apr 2005	MORI	STV	934	47%	15%	15%	18%	5%	29
23–29 Mar 2005	Scottish Opinion	Daily Record	1,045	52%	17%	12%	16%	3% SSP 1% Other 2%	35
25 Jan – 24 Mar 2005	YouGov	The Daily Telegraph	1,945	36%	21%	19%	18%	6%	15
13 Mar 2005 (Note: Date of publication; fieldwork dates not provided.)	TNS System 3	SNP	Unknown	46%	23%	13%	16%	2%	23
8–11 Mar 2005	Scottish Opinion	Sunday Mail	504	38%	16%	23%	15%	8%	13
10–12 Feb 2005	YouGov	Scotland on Sunday	808	33%	20%	20%	19%	8%	13
27 Jan – 2 Feb 2005	TNS System 3	Sunday Herald	1,000	42%	22%	16%	16%	4%	20
15–21 Dec 2004	Scottish Opinion	Daily Mail	1,001	40%	18%	16%	18%	8%	22
4 Jun 2004 (Note: Survey end date; full range not provided.)	YouGov	The Daily Telegraph	Unknown	37%	22%	16%	17%	8%	15
9 Dec 2003	NFO System 3	The Herald	Unknown	42%	24%	12%	17%	5% SSP 4% Other 1%	18
Nov 2003	NFO System 3	The Herald	Unknown	43%	22%	18%	13%	5% SSP 3% Other 2%	21
7 Oct 2003	NFO System 3	The Herald	Unknown	39%	24%	18%	13%	6% SSP 4% Other 2%	15
27 Aug – 2 Sep 2003	NFO System 3	The Herald	977	41%	24%	14%	13%	8% SSP 4% Other 4%	17
4 Aug 2003	NFO System 3	The Herald	Unknown	40%	24%	14%	15%	7% SSP 4% Other 3%	16
Jul 2003	NFO System 3	The Herald	Unknown	40%	20%	17%	14%	9% SSP 6% Other 3%	20
Jun 2003	NFO System 3	The Herald	Unknown	41%	22%	15%	13%	8% SSP 5% Other 3%	19
29 Apr 2003	NFO System 3	The Herald	Unknown	45%	22%	13%	13%	7% SSP 4% Other 3%	23
5 Apr 2003	NFO System 3	The Herald	Unknown	38%	25%	17%	13%	8% SSP 4% Other 4%	13
27 Feb – 5 Mar 2003	NFO System 3	The Herald	1,033	42%	25%	15%	12%	6% SSP 4% Other 2%	17
30 Jan – 6 Feb 2003	NFO System 3	The Herald	1,009	42%	25%	15%	14%	3% SSP 1% Other 2%	17
13 Jan 2003	NFO System 3	The Herald	Unknown	45%	24%	14%	12%	6% SSP 3% Other 3%	21
Dec 2002	NFO System 3	The Herald	Unknown	43%	25%	15%	12%	5% SSP 4% Other 1%	18
Nov 2002	NFO System 3	The Herald	Unknown	45%	22%	16%	13%	5% SSP 3% Other 2%	23
Oct 2002	NFO System 3	The Herald	Unknown	47%	21%	15%	11%	6% SSP 3% Other 3%	26
Sep 2002	NFO System 3	The Herald	Unknown	46%	23%	13%	14%	4% SSP 2% Other 2%	23
Aug 2002	NFO System 3	The Herald	Unknown	49%	21%	10%	13%	7% SSP 5% Other 2%	28
Jul 2002	NFO System 3	The Herald	Unknown	46%	23%	11%	15%	5% SSP 3% Other 2%	23
Jun 2002	NFO System 3	The Herald	Unknown	49%	21%	13%	13%	5% SSP 4% Other 1%	28
May 2002	NFO System 3	The Herald	Unknown	47%	21%	14%	14%	4% SSP 2% Other 2%	26
Apr 2002	NFO System 3	The Herald	Unknown	41%	26%	15%	14%	3% SSP 2% Other 1%	15
Mar 2002	NFO System 3	The Herald	Unknown	46%	24%	12%	13%	4% SSP 2% Other 2%	22
Feb 2002	NFO System 3	The Herald	Unknown	47%	24%	13%	12%	4% SSP 3% Other 1%	23
Jan 2002	NFO System 3	The Herald	Unknown	46%	23%	12%	15%	5% SSP 3% Other 2%	23
Dec 2001	NFO System 3	The Herald	Unknown	47%	25%	10%	14%	3% SSP 2% Other 1%	22
Nov 2001	NFO System 3	The Herald	Unknown	54%	23%	10%	9%	3% SSP 2% Other 1%	31
Oct 2001	NFO System 3	The Herald	Unknown	52%	20%	11%	13%	4% SSP 3% Other 1%	32
Sep 2001	NFO System 3	The Herald	Unknown	49%	21%	12%	13%	4% SSP 3% Other 1%	28
Aug 2001	NFO System 3	The Herald	Unknown	44%	21%	15%	13%	6% SSP 4% Other 2%	23
21–27 Jun 2001	NFO System 3	The Herald	1,028	50%	24%	12%	11%	5% SSP 2% Other 3%	26
7 Jun 2001	2001 general election		–	43.9%	20.1%	16.4%	15.6%	4.0%	23.8

=== Wales ===
Date(s) conducted	Pollster	Client	Sample size	Lab	Con	PC	LD	Others	Lead
5 May 2005	2005 general election		–	**42.7%**	21.4%	12.6%	18.4%	4.9%	21.3
May–Jun 2004	NOP	HTV Wales	Unknown	**41%**	22%	15%	16%	6%	19
Mar 2003	NOP	HTV Wales	Unknown	**51%**	16%	15%	15%	3%	35
Nov 2002	NOP	HTV Wales	Unknown	**51%**	18%	14%	14%	2%	33
7 Jun 2001	2001 general election		–	**48.6%**	21.0%	14.3%	13.8%	2.3%	27.6

=== South West England ===
Date(s) conducted	Pollster	Client	Sample size	Con	LD	Lab	Others	Lead
5 May 2005	2005 general election		–	**38.6%**	32.6%	22.8%	6.1%	6.0
30 Jan 2005	Marketing Means	N/A	Unknown	**35%**	31%	29%	5% UKIP 2% Other 3%	4
5 Dec 2004	Marketing Means	N/A	Unknown	27%	32%	**33%**	8% UKIP 3% Other 5%	1
4 Oct 2004	Marketing Means	N/A	Unknown	27%	**35%**	29%	9% UKIP 5% Other 4%	6
7 Jun 2001	2001 general election		–	**38.5%**	31.2%	26.3%	4.0%	7.3

== Individual constituency poll results ==
=== Hartlepool ===
Hartlepool maintained its 2001 boundaries at the 2005 general election.

Date(s) conducted	Pollster	Client	Sample size	Lab	Con	LD	UKIP	Others	Lead
5 May 2005	2005 general election		–	**51.5%**	11.5%	30.4%	3.5%	3.1%	21.1
30 Sep 2004	2004 by-election		–	**40.7%**	9.7%	34.2%	10.2%	5.2%	6.5
14 Sep 2004	Channel 4		Unknown	**53%**	13%	20%	9%	5%	33
7 Jun 2001	2001 general election		–	**38.5%**	31.2%	26.3%	–	4.0%	38.2
