= 2005 United Kingdom general election =

- 5 May 2005

All 646 seats to the House of Commons 324 (Note: Given that Sinn Féin members of Parliament (MPs) practise abstentionism and do not take their seats, while the Speaker and deputies do not vote, the number of MPs needed for a majority was in practice slightly lower. Sinn Féin won 5 seats, meaning a practical majority required 321 MPs.) seats needed for a majority
- Opinion polls
- Registered: 44,245,939
- Turnout: 27,148,510; 61.4% (▲2.0 pp)
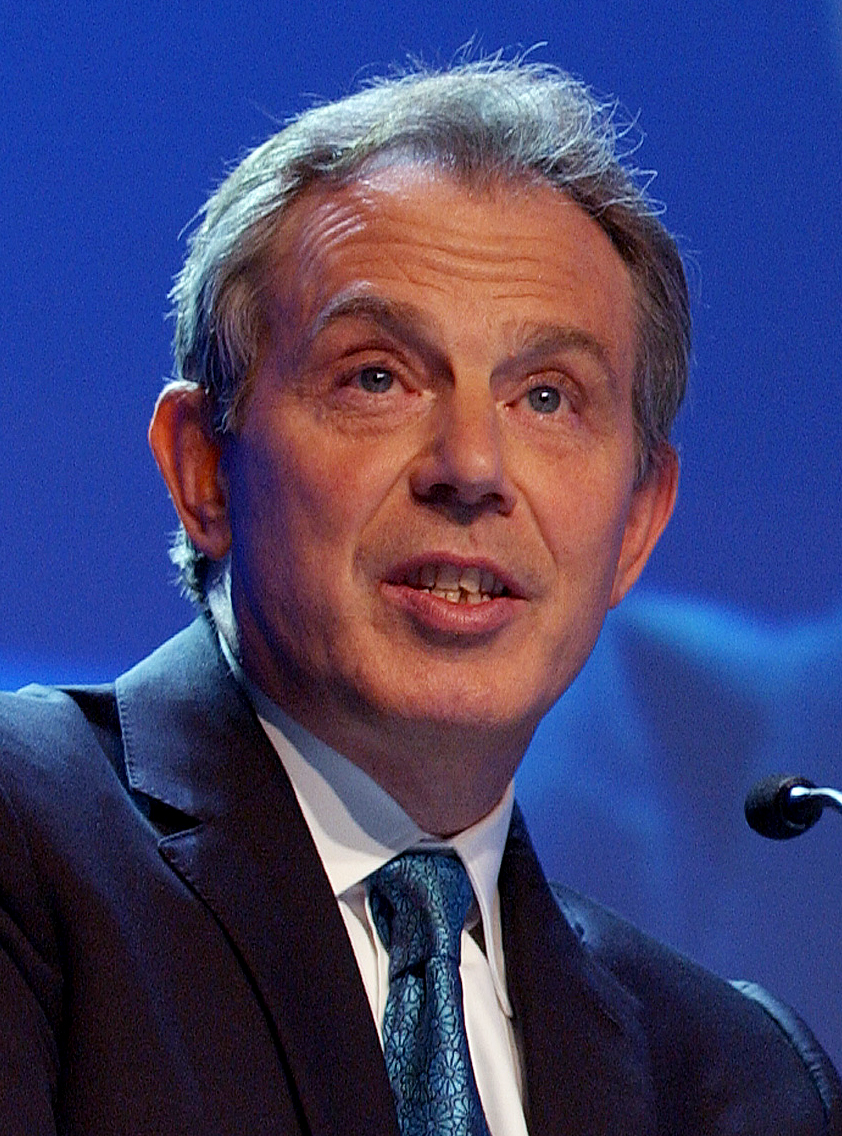

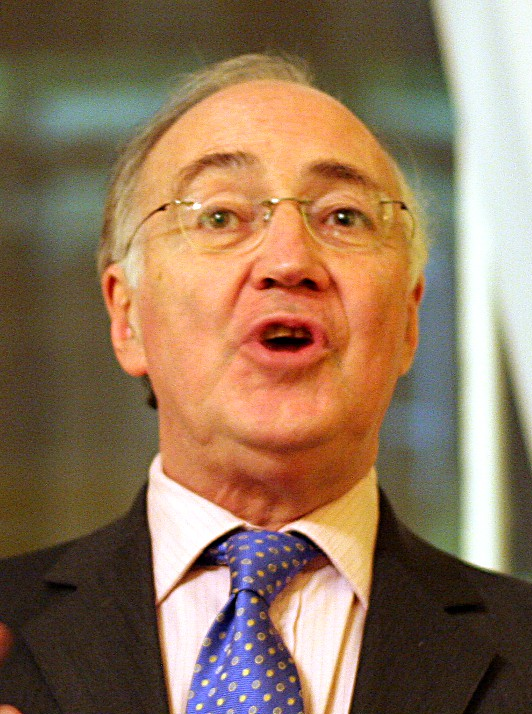

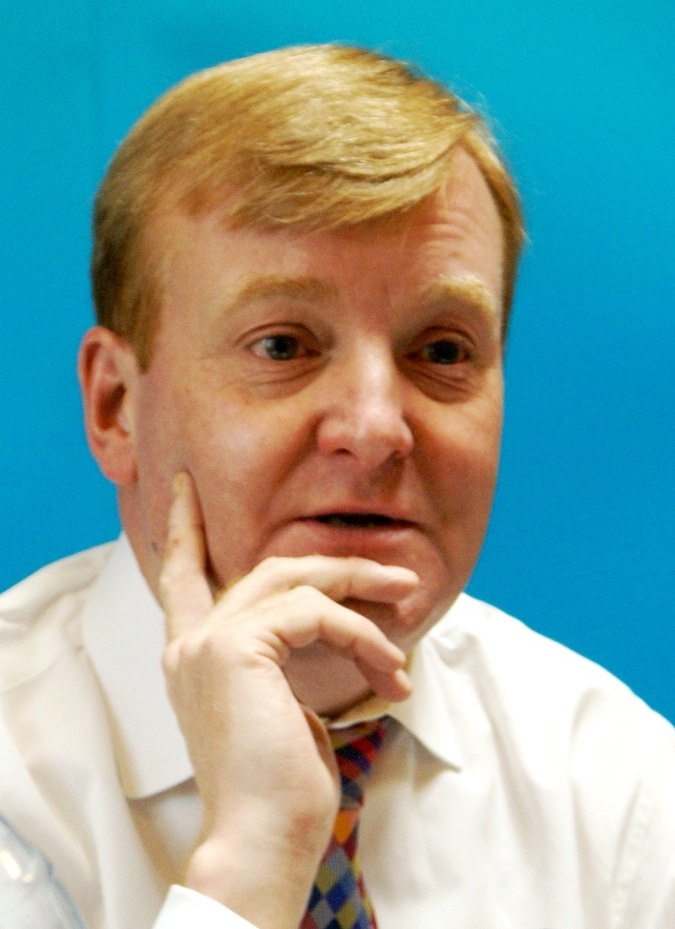
	First party	Second party	Third party
Leader	Tony Blair	Michael Howard	Charles Kennedy
Party	Labour	Conservative	Liberal Democrats
Leader since	21 July 1994	6 November 2003	9 August 1999
Leader's seat	Sedgefield	Folkestone and Hythe	Ross, Skye and Lochaber (Note: Represented Ross, Skye and Inverness West prior to dissolution. Ross, Skye and Lochaber was one of the three successor seats.)
Last election	412 seats, 40.7%	166 seats, 31.7%	52 seats, 18.3%
Seats before	403	165	51
Seats won	355 (Note: Does not include the Speaker, Michael Martin, who was included in the Labour totals by some media outlets)	198	62
Seat change	▼48*	▲33*	▲11*
Popular vote	9,552,376	8,785,942	5,985,704
Percentage	35.2%	32.4%	22.0%
Swing	▼5.5 pp	▲0.7 pp	▲3.7 pp
- Colours denote the winning party, as shown in the main table of results. * Indicates boundary change – so this is a notional figure

- Composition of the House of Commons after the election
Prime Minister before election
Tony Blair
Labour
Prime Minister after election
Tony Blair
Labour

A general election was held in the United Kingdom on 5 May 2005, to elect 646 members to the House of Commons. The governing Labour Party led by Prime Minister Tony Blair won its third consecutive victory, with Blair becoming the second Labour leader after Harold Wilson to form three majority governments. However, its majority fell to 66 seats; the majority it won four years earlier had been of 167 seats. The UK media interpreted the results as an indicator of a breakdown in trust in the government, and especially in Blair.

This was the first time the Labour Party had won a third consecutive election, but would be the last election victory for Labour until 2024. The Liberal Democrats, led by Charles Kennedy, increased its seat count for a third consecutive election, netting the most seats in its history until 2024 and the most of any of the connected British Liberal parties since 1923. The Labour campaign emphasised a strong economy; however, Blair had suffered a decline in popularity, which was exacerbated by the controversial decision to send British troops to invade Iraq in 2003. Despite this, Labour mostly retained its leads over the Conservatives in opinion polls on economic competence and leadership, and Conservative leaders Iain Duncan Smith (2001–03) and Michael Howard (2003–05) struggled to capitalise on Blair's unpopularity, with the party consistently trailing behind Labour in the polls throughout the 2001–05 parliament. The Conservatives campaigned on policies such as immigration limits, improving poorly managed hospitals and reducing high crime rates. The Liberal Democrats took a strong stance against the Iraq War, particularly due to the absence of a second United Nations resolution; this anti-war position resonated with disenchanted Labour voters, leading to the Liberal Democrats achieving what was at that point their largest vote share in their history.

Blair won a third term as prime minister, with Labour having 355 MPs, but with a popular vote share of just 35.2%. This was the smallest of any majority government in UK electoral history until Keir Starmer won an even lower share in 2024. In terms of votes, Labour was only narrowly ahead of the Conservatives, but the party still held a comfortable lead in terms of seats. The Conservatives returned 198 MPs, with 32 more seats than they had won at the previous general election, and won the popular vote in England, though they still ended up with 91 fewer MPs in England than Labour. The Liberal Democrats saw their share of the popular vote increase by 3.7%, and won the most seats of any third party since 1923, with 62 MPs. Anti-war activist and former Labour MP George Galloway was elected as the MP for Bethnal Green and Bow under the Respect – The Unity Coalition banner, unseating Oona King; Richard Taylor was re-elected for Kidderminster Health Concern in Wyre Forest; and independent candidate Peter Law was elected in Blaenau Gwent.

In Northern Ireland, the Ulster Unionist Party (UUP), the more moderate of the main unionist parties, which had dominated Northern Irish politics since the 1920s, was reduced from six MPs to one, with party leader David Trimble himself being unseated. The more hardline Democratic Unionist Party became the largest Northern Irish party, with nine MPs elected. Apart from Trimble, notable MPs leaving the House of Commons at this election included former SDLP leader John Hume; former Cabinet ministers Estelle Morris, Paul Boateng, Chris Smith, Gillian Shephard, Virginia Bottomley and Michael Portillo; the Father of the House of Commons Tam Dalyell; Tony Banks; and Sir Teddy Taylor. Stephen Twigg lost the Enfield Southgate constituency back to the Conservatives. Notable MPs who joined the House of Commons at this election include future Labour leader and energy secretary Ed Miliband, future chancellor of the Exchequer and health secretary Jeremy Hunt, and future education secretary Michael Gove.

Following the election, Michael Howard conceded defeat, resigned as Conservative leader and was succeeded by future prime minister David Cameron. Blair resigned as both prime minister and leader of the Labour Party in June 2007, and was replaced by Gordon Brown, the then–Chancellor of the Exchequer. The election results were broadcast live on the BBC and presented by Peter Snow, David Dimbleby, Tony King, Jeremy Paxman and Andrew Marr.

== Overview ==
The governing Labour Party, led by Tony Blair, was looking to secure a third consecutive term in office and to retain a large majority. The Conservative Party was seeking to regain seats lost to both Labour and the Liberal Democrats since the 1992 general election. The Liberal Democrats hoped to make gains from both main parties, but especially the Conservative Party, with a 'decapitation' strategy which targeted members of the Shadow Cabinet. The Lib Dems had the lofty ambition of forming either the Government or the Opposition, but more realistically hoped to play a major part in a parliament led by a minority Labour or Conservative government. In Northern Ireland the Democratic Unionist Party sought to make further gains from the Ulster Unionist Party in unionist politics, and Sinn Féin hoped to overtake the Social Democratic and Labour Party in nationalist politics. (Sinn Féin MPs do not take their seats in the House of Commons – they follow a policy of abstentionism.) Plaid Cymru and the pro-independence Scottish National Party stood candidates in every constituency in Wales and Scotland respectively.

Many seats were contested by other parties, including several parties without incumbents in the House of Commons. Parties that were not represented at Westminster, but had seats in the devolved assemblies and/or the European Parliament, included the Alliance Party of Northern Ireland, the UK Independence Party, the Green Party of England and Wales, the Scottish Green Party, and the Scottish Socialist Party. The Health Concern party also stood again. A full list of parties which declared their intention to run can be found on the list of parties contesting the 2005 general election.

All parties campaigned using such tools as party manifestos, party political broadcasts and touring the country in what are commonly referred to as battle buses.

Local elections in parts of England and in Northern Ireland were held on the same day. The polls were open for fifteen hours, from 7 am to 10 pm BST (UTC+1). The election came just over three weeks after the dissolution of parliament on 11 April by Queen Elizabeth II, at the request of Prime Minister Tony Blair.

== Campaign ==
Following the death of Pope John Paul II on 2 April, it was announced that the calling of the election would be delayed until 5 April.

Thanks to eight years of sustained economic growth, Labour could point to a strong economy, with greater investment in public services such as education and health. This was overshadowed, however, by the issue of the controversial 2003 invasion of Iraq, which met widespread public criticism at the time and would dog Blair throughout the campaign. Chancellor Gordon Brown played a prominent role in the election campaign, frequently appearing with Blair and ensuring that the economy would remain the central focus of Labour's message.

Recently elected Conservative leader Michael Howard brought a great level of experience and stability to a party that had ousted its former leader Iain Duncan Smith just 18 months prior. The Conservative campaign was managed by Australian strategist Lynton Crosby. The campaign focused on more traditional conservative issues like immigration, which created some controversy with the slogan: 'It's not racist to impose limits on immigration.' They also criticised Labour's 'dirty' hospitals and high crime levels through the catchphrase: 'Are you thinking what we're thinking?'

Labour's counter-attack emphasised Howard's role in the unpopular Major Government of 1992–1997. Labour aired a party election broadcast attacking Howard: a montage of scenes from Howard's tenure as Home Secretary, including prison riots and home repossessions. It also launched a billboard campaign showing Howard, and the Conservative Party's four previous leaders (Iain Duncan Smith, William Hague, John Major and Margaret Thatcher), with the caption 'Britain's working, don't let the Tories wreck it again.'

For the Liberal Democrats, this was the second and final election campaign fought by leader Charles Kennedy, who offered a more down-to-earth approach to voters and strongly opposed the Iraq War, both of which proved popular. There were some questions, however, over Kennedy's abilities: at the Liberal Democrat manifesto launch, he was asked about local income tax, but appeared confused on the figures. Both the Liberal Democrats and the Conservatives were keen to tackle Labour's introduction of tuition fees, which both opposition parties opposed and promised to abolish.

== Ballot ==
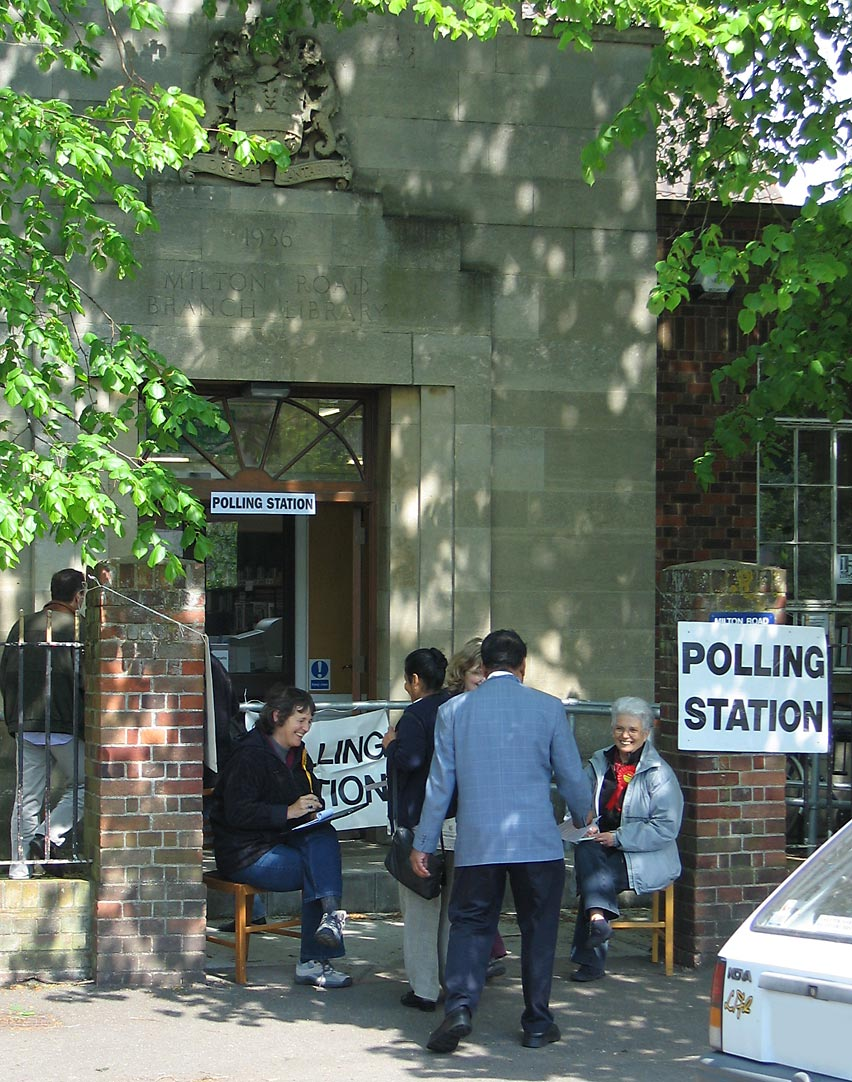
Unofficial tellers, wearing party rosettes, sit outside polling stations collecting voter registration numbers

At the close of voting (2200 BST) the ballot boxes were sealed and returned to the counting centres, where counting proceeded under the supervision of the returning officer who was obliged to declare the result as soon as it was known. As previously, there was serious competition amongst constituencies to be first to declare. Sunderland South repeated its performance in the last three elections and declared Labour incumbent Chris Mullin re-elected as MP with a majority of 11,059 at approximately 2245 BST (failing by two minutes to beat its previous best, but making it eligible for entry into the Guinness Book of World Records as longest consecutive delivery of first results). The vote itself represented a swing (in a safe Labour seat, in a safe Labour region) of about 4% to the Conservatives and 4.5% to the Liberal Democrats, somewhat below the prediction of BBC/ITV exit polls published shortly after 2200 BST.

Sunderland North was the next to declare, followed by Houghton and Washington East, both of whose Labour MPs retained their seats but with reductions in the incumbent majorities of up to 9%. The first Scottish seat to declare was Rutherglen and Hamilton West — another safe Labour seat, also a Labour hold, but with the majority reduced by 4%. The first seat to change hands was Putney, where Labour's majority of 2,771 fell to a strong Conservative challenge, with a total swing of about 5,000 (6.2%). This was also the first seat to be declared for the Conservatives. The first Liberal Democrat seat to be declared was North East Fife, the constituency of Lib Dem deputy leader Sir Menzies Campbell which he had held since 1987.

The constituency of Crawley in West Sussex had the slimmest majority of any seat, with Labour's Laura Moffatt holding off the Conservatives' Henry Smith by 37 votes after three recounts.

== Polling ==
Following problems with exit polls in previous British elections, the BBC and ITV agreed for the first time to pool their respective data, using results from Mori and NOP. More than 20,000 people were interviewed for the poll at 120 polling stations across the country. The predictions were exceptionally accurate – initial projections saw Labour returned to power with a majority of 66 (down from 160), and the final result was indeed a Labour majority of 66.

The projected shares of the vote in Great Britain were Labour 35%, Conservatives 33%, Liberal Democrats 22% and other parties 8%. However, the Conservatives were expected to make the biggest gains – 44 seats according to the exit poll – with the Liberal Democrats expected to take as few as two. Whilst the Lib Dems' vote share predicted by the exit poll was accurate (22.6% compared to the actual 22.0%), they did better in some Lib Dem – Labour marginal contests than predicted on the basis of the national share of the vote, and achieved a net gain of 11 seats.

== 2001 notional result ==
There were major boundary changes in Scotland, where the number of seats was reduced from 72 to 59. As a result of this each party lost some seats, and this notional election result below is based on the 2001 election results if they had been fought on these new 2005 boundaries.

2001 UK general election
Party	Seats	Gains	Losses	Net gain/loss	Seats %	Votes %	Votes	+/−
Labour	403	2	8	-6	62.38	40.7	10,724,953	
Conservative	165	9	8	+1	25.54	31.7	8,357,615	
Liberal Democrats	51	8	2	+6	7.89	18.3	4,814,321	
SNP	4		1	-1	0.62	1.8	464,314	
Other parties	23				3.57	7.5		

== Results ==
Party	Labour Party	Conservative Party	Liberal Democrats	UK Independence Party	Scottish National Party	Greens (GPEW+SGP+GPNI)	Democratic; Unionist Party
Leader	Tony Blair	Michael Howard	Charles Kennedy	Roger Knapman	Alex Salmond	Caroline Lucas (GPEW)	Ian Paisley
Votes	9,552,376 (35.2%)	8,785,942 (32.4%)	5,985,704 (22.0%)	605,973 (2.2%)	412,267 (1.5%)	257,758 (1.0%)	241,856 (0.9%)
Seats	355 (55.2%)	198 (30.7%)	62 (9.6%)	0 (0.0%)	6 (0.9%)	0 (0.0%)	9 (1.4%)

Result by countries and English regions

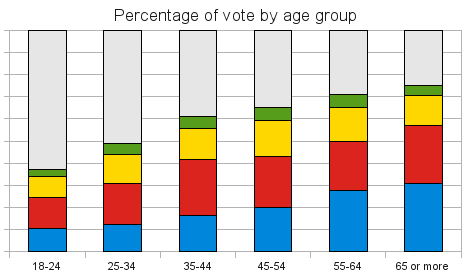
Votes cast by age group: Con, Lab, LD, other parties (green) and those not voting (grey).

At 04:28 BST, it was announced that Labour had won Corby, giving them 324 seats in the House of Commons out of those then declared and an overall majority, Labour's total reaching 355 seats out of the 646 House of Commons seats. Labour received 35.3% of the popular vote, equating to approximately 22% of the electorate on a 61.3% turnout, up from 59.4% turnout in 2001.

As expected, voter disenchantment led to an increase of support for many opposition parties, and caused many eligible to vote, not to turn out. Labour achieved a third successive term in office for the first time in their history, though with reduction of the Labour majority from 167 to 67 (as it was before the declaration of South Staffordshire). As it became clear that Labour had won an overall majority, Michael Howard, the leader of the Conservative Party, announced his intention to retire from frontline politics. The final seat to declare was the delayed poll in South Staffordshire, at just after 1 am, Friday 24 June.

The election was followed by further criticism of the UK electoral system. Calls for reform came particularly from Lib Dem supporters, citing that they received only just over 10% of the overall seats with 22.1% of the popular vote. The only parties to win a substantially higher percentage of seats than they achieved in votes were Labour, the Democratic Unionist Party, Sinn Féin, Health Concern (which ran only one candidate). The results of the election give a Gallagher index of disproportionality of 16.76.

Seats won in the election (outer ring) against number of votes (inner ring)

Labour's vote declined to 35.3%, a decline of 5.4% and the second lowest share of the popular vote to have formed a majority government in the House of Commons. In many areas the collapse in the Labour vote resulted in a host of seats changing hands. Labour also failed to gain any new seats, almost unique in any election since 1945. As well as losing seats to the Tories and the Liberal Democrats, Labour also lost Blaenau Gwent, its safest seat in Wales, to Independent Peter Law, and Bethnal Green and Bow to Respect candidate George Galloway. Nevertheless, the Labour government claimed that being returned to office for a third term for the first time ever showed the public approval of Labour's governance and the continued unpopularity of the Conservatives.

The Conservatives asserted that their increased number of seats showed disenchantment with the Labour government. The election result was later considered a precursor to the Conservative breakthrough at the next election. Following three consecutive elections of declining representation, and then in 2001 a net gain of just one seat, 2005 was the first general election since their famous 1983 landslide victory where the number of Conservative seats increased appreciably – although the party's vote share increased only slightly, by 0.6%.

The Liberal Democrats claimed that their continued increase in seats and percentage vote share over the past several elections showed they were in a position to make further gains from both parties. They pointed in particular to the fact that they were now in second place in roughly one hundred and ninety constituencies and that, after having suffered a net loss to Labour in the 1992 general election and having not taken a single seat off Labour in 1997, they had in this election built on their gains off Labour from the 2001 election. The Liberal Democrats also managed to take three seats from the Conservatives, one notable victory being that of Tim Farron over Tim Collins in Westmorland and Lonsdale, through the use of a 'decapitation strategy' which targeted senior Tories. The party increased their percentage of the vote by 3.7% nationwide.

Meanwhile, the Scottish National Party improved its position in Scotland, regaining the Western Isles and Dundee East from Labour, having lost both seats in 1987. In Wales, Plaid Cymru failed to gain any seats and lost Ceredigion to the Liberal Democrats. In Northern Ireland the Ulster Unionists were all but wiped out, only keeping North Down, with leader David Trimble losing his seat in Upper Bann. For the first time, the DUP became the biggest party in Northern Ireland.

It was the first general election since 1929 in which no party received more than ten million votes. It was the most 'three-cornered' election since 1923, though the Liberal Democrats failed to match the higher national votes of the SDP–Liberal Alliance in the 1980s. In fact, the total combined vote for Labour, the Conservatives and the Liberal Democrats proved to be the lowest main three-party vote since 1922.

Summary of the results of the 5 May 2005 United Kingdom general election to the House of Commons of the United Kingdom
Political party	Leader	Candidates	Elected	Seats gained	Seats lost	Net change in seats	% of seats	Number of votes	% of votes	Change in % of vote	Votes per seat won
Labour	Tony Blair	627 (Note: Includes 32 Co-operative Party candidates, as part of the Labour-Co-op alliance)	355 (Note: Includes 29 Co-operative Party MPs, as part of the Labour-Co-op alliance)	0	47	–47 (Note: Includes -1 Co-operative Party MPs, as part of the Labour-Co-op alliance)	55.2 (Note: Includes 4.5% for the Co-operative Party, as part of the Labour-Co-op alliance)	9,552,436 (Note: Includes 584,700 for the Co-operative Party, as part of the Labour-Co-op alliance)	35.2 (Note: Includes 2.1% for the Co-operative Party, as part of the Labour-Co-op alliance)	–5.5 (Note: Includes -0.2% for the Co-operative Party, as part of the Labour-Co-op alliance)	26,908 (Note: 18,272 for the Co-operative Party, as part of the Labour-Co-op alliance)
Conservative	Michael Howard	630	198	36	3	+33	30.7	8,784,915	32.4	+0.7	44,368
Liberal Democrats	Charles Kennedy	626	62	16	5	+11	9.6	5,985,454	22.0	+3.8	96,540
UKIP	Roger Knapman	496	0	0	0	0	0.0	605,973	2.2	+0.8	N/A
SNP	Alex Salmond	59	6	2	0	+2	0.9	412,267	1.5	–0.2	68,711
Green	Caroline Lucas and Keith Taylor	182	0	0	0	0	0.0	257,758	1.0	+0.4	N/A
DUP	Ian Paisley	18	9	4	0	+4	1.4	241,856	0.9	+0.2	26,873
BNP	Nick Griffin	119	0	0	0	0	0.0	192,745	0.7	+0.5	N/A
Plaid Cymru	Ieuan Wyn Jones	40	3	0	1	–1	0.5	174,838	0.6	–0.1	58,279
Sinn Féin	Gerry Adams	18	5	1	0	+1	0.8	174,530	0.6	–0.1	34,906
UUP	David Trimble	18	1	0	5	–5	0.2	127,414	0.5	–0.3	127,414
SDLP	Mark Durkan	18	3	1	1	0	0.5	125,626	0.5	–0.1	41,875
Independent	N/A	180	1	1	0	+1	0.2	122,416	0.5	+0.1	122,416
Respect	Linda Smith	26	1	1	0	+1	0.2	68,094	0.3	N/A	68,094
Scottish Socialist	Colin Fox	58	0	0	0	0	0.0	43,514	0.2	–0.1	N/A
Veritas	Robert Kilroy-Silk	65	0	0	0	0	0.0	40,607	0.1	N/A	N/A
Alliance	David Ford	12	0	0	0	0	0.0	28,291	0.1	0.0	N/A
Green	Shiona Baird and Robin Harper	19	0	0	0	0	0.0	25,760	0.1	+0.1	N/A
Socialist Labour	Arthur Scargill	49	0	0	0	0	0.0	20,167	0.1	0.0	N/A
Liberal	Michael Meadowcroft	14	0	0	0	0	0.0	19,068	0.1	0.0	N/A
Health Concern	Richard Taylor	1	1	0	0	0	0.2	18,739	0.1	0.0	18,739
Speaker	N/A	1	1	0	0	0	0.2	15,153	0.1	0.0	15,153
English Democrat	Robin Tilbrook	24	0	0	0	0	0.0	15,149	0.1	N/A	N/A
Socialist	Peter Taaffe	17	0	0	0	0	0.0	9,398	0.0	N/A	N/A
National Front	Tom Holmes	13	0	0	0	0	0.0	8,079	0.0	N/A	N/A
Legalise Cannabis	Alun Buffry	21	0	0	0	0	0.0	6,950	0.0	0.0	N/A
Monster Raving Loony	Howling Laud Hope	19	0	0	0	0	0.0	6,311	0.0	0.0	N/A
Community Action	Peter Franzen	3	0	0	0	0	0.0	5,984	0.0	N/A	N/A
Christian Vote	George Hargreaves	10	0	0	0	0	0.0	4,004	0.0	N/A	N/A
Mebyon Kernow	Dick Cole	4	0	0	0	0	0.0	3,552	0.0	0.0	N/A
Forward Wales	John Marek	6	0	0	0	0	0.0	3,461	0.0	N/A	N/A
CPA	Alan Craig	9	0	0	0	0	0.0	3,291	0.0	N/A	N/A
Rainbow Dream Ticket	Rainbow George Weiss	23	0	0	0	0	0.0	2,463	0.0	N/A	N/A
Community Group	Martin Williams	1	0	0	0	0	0.0	2,365	0.0	N/A	N/A
Ashfield Independents	Roy Adkins	1	0	0	0	0	0.0	2,292	0.0	N/A	N/A
Alliance for Green Socialism	Mike Davies	5	0	0	0	0	0.0	1,978	0.0	N/A	N/A
Residents Association of London	Malvin Brown	2	0	0	0	0	0.0	1,850	0.0	N/A	N/A
Workers' Party	Seán Garland	6	0	0	0	0	0.0	1,669	0.0	0.0	N/A
Socialist Environmental	Goretti Horgan	1	0	0	0	0	0.0	1,649	0.0	N/A	N/A
Scottish Unionist	Daniel Houston	1	0	0	0	0	0.0	1,266	0.0	0.0	N/A
Workers Revolutionary	Sheila Torrance	10	0	0	0	0	0.0	1,241	0.0	0.0	N/A
New England	Michael Tibby	1	0	0	0	0	0.0	1,224	0.0	N/A	N/A
Communist	Robert Griffiths	6	0	0	0	0	0.0	1,124	0.0	0.0	N/A
Community Group		1	0	0	0	0	0.0	1,118	0.0	N/A	N/A
Peace and Progress	Chris Cooper	3	0	0	0	0	0.0	1,036	0.0	N/A	N/A
Scottish Senior Citizens	John Swinburne	2	0	0	0	0	0.0	1,017	0.0	N/A	N/A
Your Party	Daniel Thompson	2	0	0	0	0	0.0	1,006	0.0	N/A	N/A
SOS! Northampton	Yvonne Dale	2	0	0	0	0	0.0	932	0.0	N/A	N/A
Ind. Working Class	None	1	0	0	0	0	0.0	892	0.0	N/A	N/A
Democratic Labour	Brian Powell	1	0	0	0	0	0.0	770	0.0	N/A	N/A
British Public Party	Kashif Rana	1	0	0	0	0	0.0	763	0.0	N/A	N/A
Free Scotland Party	Brian Nugent	3	0	0	0	0	0.0	743	0.0	N/A	N/A
Pensioners Party Scotland	George Rodger	1	0	0	0	0	0.0	716	0.0	N/A	N/A
Publican Party	Kit Fraser and Don Lawson	1	0	0	0	0	0.0	678	0.0	N/A	N/A
English Independence Party	Andrew Constantine	1	0	0	0	0	0.0	654	0.0	N/A	N/A
Socialist Unity	None	2	0	0	0	0	0.0	581	0.0	N/A	N/A
Local Community Party	Jack Crossfield	1	0	0	0	0	0.0	570	0.0	N/A	N/A
Clause 28	David Braid	3	0	0	0	0	0.0	516	0.0	N/A	N/A
UK Community Issues Party	Michael Osman	3	0	0	0	0	0.0	502	0.0	N/A	N/A
Total			646				Turnout	27,148,510	61.4		42,026

Popular vote
1. Labour (35.2%)
2. Conservative (32.4%)
3. Liberal Democrats (22.0%)
4. UKIP (2.20%)
5. SNP (1.50%)
6. Greens (1.00%)
7. DUP (0.90%)
8. BNP (0.90%)
9. Sinn Féin (0.90%)
10. Plaid Cymru (0.90%)

The figure of 355 seats for Labour does not include the Speaker Michael Martin. See also the list of parties standing in Northern Ireland.

Government's new majority	66

Popular vote
Labour	35.2%
Conservative	32.4%
Liberal Democrat	22.1%
UK Independence	2.2%
Scottish National	1.5%
Green	1.0%
Others	5.7%

Parliamentary seats
Labour	55.1%
Conservative	30.7%
Liberal Democrat	9.6%
Democratic Unionist	1.4%
Scottish National	0.9%
Sinn Féin	0.8%
Others	1.6%

== Seats changing hands ==
=== MPs who lost their seats ===
Party	Name	Constituency	Office held whilst in power	Year elected	Defeated by	Party
Labour	Stephen Twigg	Enfield Southgate	Minister of State for Schools	1997	David Burrowes	Conservative Party
Labour	Melanie Johnson	Welwyn Hatfield	Minister of State for Public Health	1997	Grant Shapps	Conservative Party
Labour	Chris Leslie	Shipley	Parliamentary under-secretary of state in the Department for Constitutional Affairs	1997	Philip Davies	Conservative Party
Labour	Ivan Henderson	Harwich	parliamentary private secretary at the Home Office	1997	Douglas Carswell	Conservative Party
Labour	David Stewart	Inverness East, Nairn and Lochaber (contested Inverness, Nairn, Badenoch and Strathspey)	Parliamentary Private Secretary to the Secretary of State for Scotland	1997	Danny Alexander	Liberal Democrats
Labour	Peter Bradley	The Wrekin	Parliamentary Private Secretary to the Minister of State for Rural Affairs	1997	Mark Pritchard	Conservative Party
Labour	Keith Bradley	Manchester Withington	Treasurer of the Household	1987	John Leech	Liberal Democrats
Labour	Barbara Roche	Hornsey and Wood Green	Minister of State for Asylum and Immigration	1992	Lynne Featherstone	Liberal Democrats
Labour	Calum MacDonald	Na h-Eileanan an Iar	Minister for Gaelic	1987	Angus MacNeil	Scottish National Party
Labour	Roger Casale	Wimbledon		1997	Stephen Hammond	Conservative Party
Labour	Paul Stinchcombe	Wellingborough		1997	Peter Bone	Conservative Party
Labour	Kerry Pollard	St Albans		1997	Anne Main	Conservative Party
Labour	Tony Clarke	Northampton South		1997	Brian Binley	Conservative Party
Labour	Helen Clark	Peterborough		1997	Stewart Jackson	Conservative Party
Labour	Tony Colman	Putney		1997	Justine Greening	Conservative Party
Labour	Lorna Fitzsimons	Rochdale		1997	Paul Rowen	Liberal Democrats
Labour	Andy King	Rugby and Kenilworth		1997	Jeremy Wright	Conservative Party
Labour	Lawrie Quinn	Scarborough and Whitby		1997	Robert Goodwill	Conservative Party
Labour	Brian White	North East Milton Keynes		1997	Mark Lancaster	Conservative Party
Labour	Huw Edwards	Monmouth		1997	David Davies	Conservative Party
Labour	Phil Sawford	Kettering		1997	Philip Hollobone	Conservative Party
Labour	Linda Perham	Ilford North		1997	Lee Scott	Conservative Party
Labour	John Cryer	Hornchurch		1997	James Brokenshire	Conservative Party
Labour	Tony McWalter	Hemel Hempstead		1997	Mike Penning	Conservative Party
Labour	Candy Atherton	Falmouth and Camborne		1997	Julia Goldsworthy	Liberal Democrats
Labour	Nigel Beard	Bexleyheath and Crayford		1997	David Evennett	Conservative Party
Labour	Oona King	Bethnal Green & Bow		1997	George Galloway	Respect Party
Labour	Valerie Davey	Bristol West		1997	Stephen Williams	Liberal Democrats
Labour	Anne Campbell	Cambridge		1992	David Howarth	Liberal Democrats
Labour	Jon Owen Jones	Cardiff Central		1992	Jenny Willott	Liberal Democrats
Labour	Gareth Thomas	Clwyd West		1997	David Jones	Conservative Party
Labour	Geraint Davies	Croydon Central		1997	Andrew Pelling	Conservative Party
Labour	John Lyons	Strathkelvin and Bearsden (contested East Dunbartonshire)		2001	Jo Swinson	Liberal Democrats
Labour	Iain Luke	Dundee East		2001	Stewart Hosie	Scottish National Party
Labour	Chris Pond	Gravesham	Parliamentary Under-Secretary of State for Work and Pensions	1997	Adam Holloway	Conservative Party
Liberal Democrats	Brian Cotter	Weston-super-Mare	Small Business Spokesperson	1997	John Penrose	Conservative Party
Liberal Democrats	Sue Doughty	Guildford		2001	Anne Milton	Conservative Party
Liberal Democrats	Matthew Green	Ludlow		2001	Philip Dunne	Conservative Party
Liberal Democrats	David Rendel	Newbury		1993	Richard Benyon	Conservative Party
Conservative	Tim Collins	Westmorland and Lonsdale	Shadow Secretary of State for Education and Skills	1997	Tim Farron	Liberal Democrats
Conservative	Peter Duncan	Galloway and Upper Nithsdale (contested Dumfries & Galloway)	Shadow Secretary of State for Scotland	2001	Russell Brown	Labour Party
Conservative	Adrian Flook	Taunton		2001	Jeremy Browne	Liberal Democrats
Conservative	John Taylor	Solihull		1983	Lorely Burt	Liberal Democrats
Ulster Unionist Party	David Trimble	Upper Bann	Parliamentary Leader of the Ulster Unionists	1990	David Simpson	Democratic Unionist Party
Ulster Unionist Party	Roy Beggs	East Antrim		1983	Sammy Wilson	Democratic Unionist Party
Ulster Unionist Party	David Burnside	South Antrim		2001	William McCrea	Democratic Unionist Party
Plaid Cymru	Simon Thomas	Ceredigion		2000	Mark Williams	Liberal Democrats
Scottish National Party	Annabelle Ewing	Perth (contested Ochil and South Perthshire)		2001	Gordon Banks	Labour Party

=== Seats which changed allegiance ===
Labour to Conservative (31)

- Bexleyheath and Crayford
- Braintree
- Clwyd West
- Croydon Central
- Dumfriesshire, Clydesdale and Tweeddale
- Enfield Southgate
- Forest of Dean
- Gravesham
- Hammersmith and Fulham
- Harwich
- Hemel Hempstead
- Hornchurch
- Ilford North
- Kettering
- Lancaster and Wyre
- Monmouth
- North East Milton Keynes
- Northampton South
- Peterborough
- Preseli Pembrokeshire
- Putney
- Reading East
- Rugby and Kenilworth
- St Albans
- Scarborough and Whitby
- Shipley
- Shrewsbury and Atcham
- Wellingborough
- Welwyn Hatfield
- Wimbledon
- The Wrekin

Labour to Liberal Democrat (11)

- Birmingham Yardley
- Bristol West
- Cambridge
- Cardiff Central
- East Dunbartonshire
- Falmouth and Camborne
- Hornsey and Wood Green
- Inverness, Nairn, Badenoch and Strathspey
- Leeds North West
- Manchester Withington
- Rochdale

Liberal Democrat to Conservative (5)

- Guildford
- Ludlow
- Newbury
- Torridge and West Devon
- Weston-Super-Mare

Conservative to Liberal Democrat (3)

- Solihull
- Taunton
- Westmorland and Lonsdale

Labour to SNP (2)

- Dundee East
- Na h-Eileanan an Iar

UUP to DUP (4)

- East Antrim
- South Antrim
- Lagan Valley
- Upper Bann

Labour to Independent (1)

- Blaenau Gwent

Liberal Democrat to Labour (1)

- Leicester South

PC to Liberal Democrat (1)

- Ceredigion

UUP to SDLP (1)

- Belfast South

Labour to Respect (1)

- Bethnal Green and Bow

SDLP to Sinn Féin (1)

- Newry and Armagh

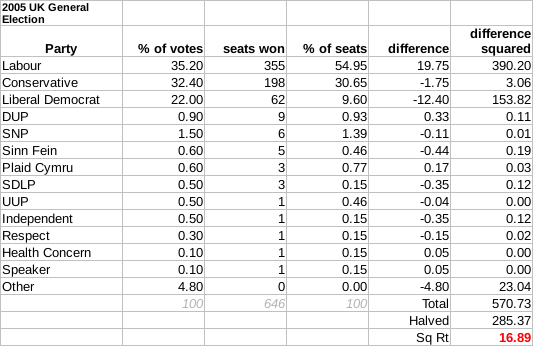
The disproportionality of the House of Commons in the 2005 election was 16.89 according to the Gallagher Index, mainly between Labour and the Liberal Democrats.

== Post-election events ==
=== Formation of government ===
Following the election, Labour remained in power with Tony Blair remaining as Prime Minister. The morning after the election, Blair travelled to Buckingham Palace to inform The Queen of the election result and to receive permission to form a government, consequently beginning his third term as prime minister. Blair reshuffled his Cabinet and junior ministers over the following weekend, with formal announcements made on 9 May 2005. The most senior positions of Chancellor, Home Secretary and Foreign Secretary remained the same (Gordon Brown, Charles Clarke and Jack Straw respectively), but a few new faces were added. Most notably, David Blunkett returned to cabinet as the Work and Pensions Secretary, although he was forced to resign again due to another scandal before the end of the year that spawned a national press and opposition campaign for his dismissal. Patricia Hewitt became the new Health Secretary, Tessa Jowell remained as Culture Secretary, whilst Alan Johnson was promoted to Trade and Industry Secretary. Meanwhile, Ruth Kelly retained the Education job and Margaret Beckett stayed put at Environment.

The new Parliament met on 11 May for the election of the Speaker of the House of Commons.

=== New party leaders ===
On 6 May, Michael Howard announced he would be standing down as leader of the Conservative Party, but not before a review of the leadership rules. The formal leadership election began in October, and was ultimately won by David Cameron. On 7 May, David Trimble resigned as leader of the Ulster Unionist Party; Sir Reg Empey was elected as his successor at an Ulster Unionist Council meeting on 24 June.

=== End of the term ===
Blair's successor as Prime Minister, Gordon Brown (who came to office on 27 June 2007), visited Buckingham Palace on 6 April 2010 and asked the Queen to dissolve Parliament on 12 April. The next election was held on 6 May 2010.

== See also ==
- List of MPs elected in the 2005 United Kingdom general election
- 2005 United Kingdom general election in England
- 2005 United Kingdom general election in Scotland
- 2005 United Kingdom general election in Wales
- 2005 United Kingdom general election in Northern Ireland
- List of MPs for constituencies in England (2005–2010)
- List of MPs for constituencies in Northern Ireland (2005–2010)
- List of MPs for constituencies in Scotland (2005–2010)
- List of MPs for constituencies in Wales (2005–2010)
- 2005 United Kingdom local elections
- Results of the 2005 United Kingdom general election
- Results breakdown of the 2005 United Kingdom general election
