= 2005 United Kingdom general election in Wales =

- 5 May 2005

All 40 Welsh seats to the House of Commons
- Turnout: 62.6% (▲1.0 pp)
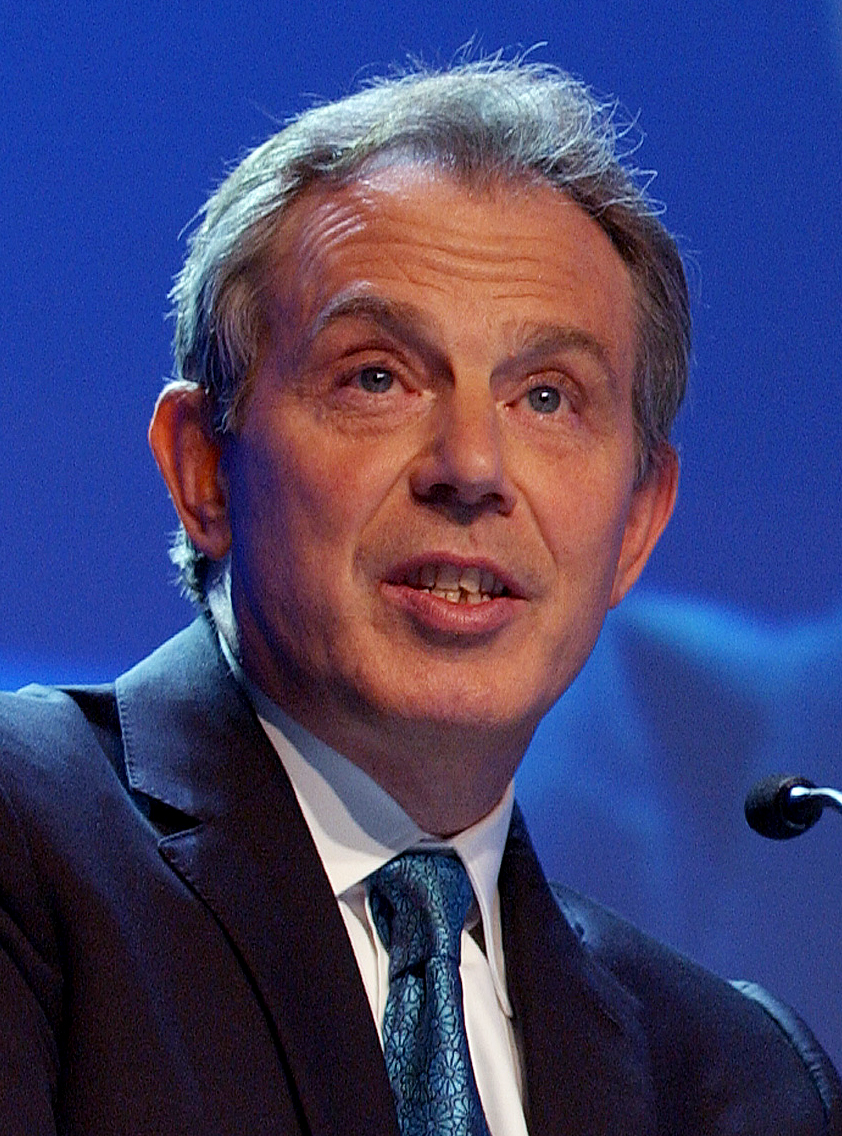

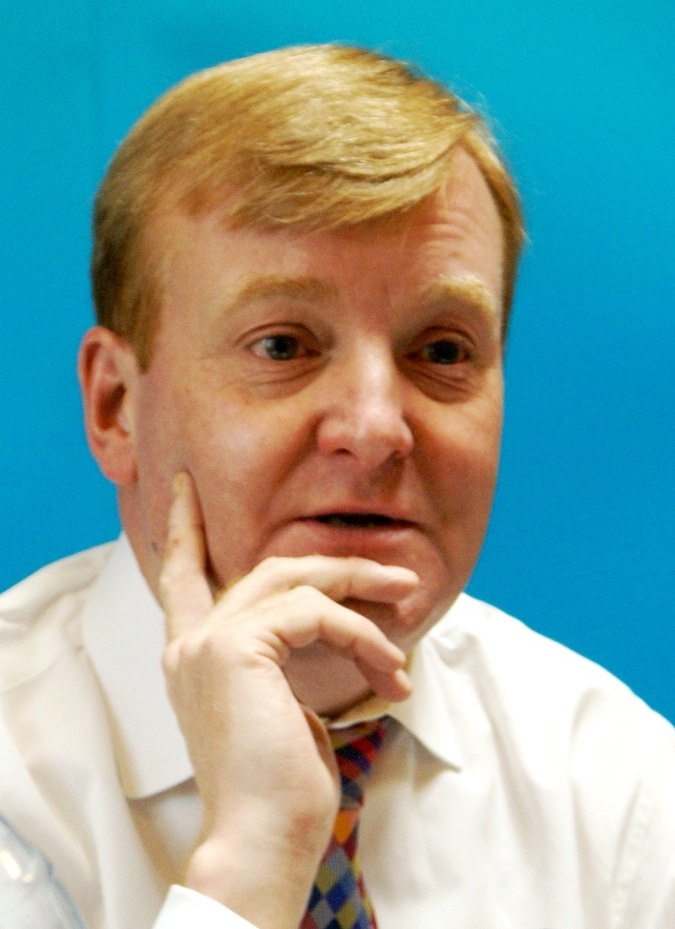

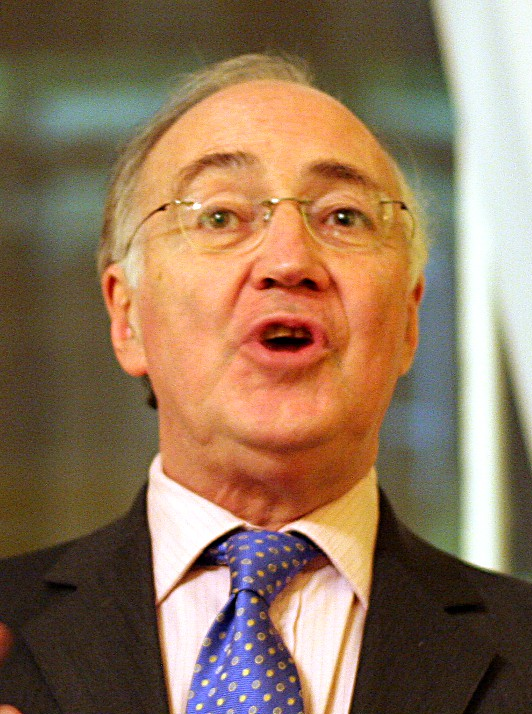

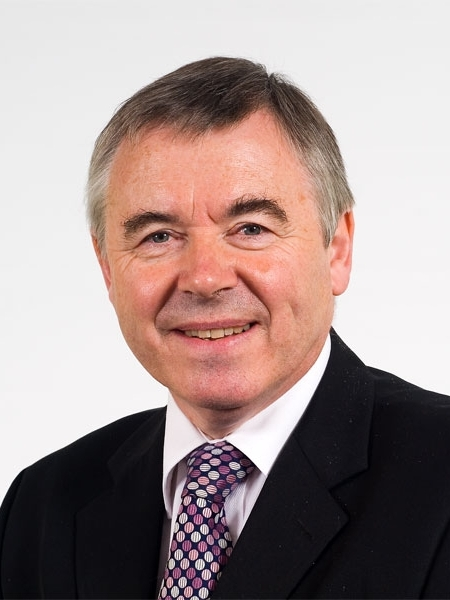
	First party	Second party
Leader	Tony Blair	Charles Kennedy
Party	Labour	Liberal Democrats
Leader since	21 July 1994	9 August 1999
Leader's seat	Sedgefield	Ross, Skye & Inverness West
Last election	34 seats, 48.6%	2 seats, 13.8%
Seats won	29	4
Seat change	▼5	▲2
Popular vote	594,821	256,249
Percentage	42.7%	18.4%
Swing	▼5.9 pp	▲4.6 pp
	Third party	Fourth party
Leader	Michael Howard	Ieuan Wyn Jones
Party	Conservative	Plaid Cymru
Leader since	6 November 2003	3 August 2000
Leader's seat	Folkestone and Hythe	Did not stand
Last election	0 seats, 21.0%	4 seats, 14.3%
Seats won	3	3
Seat change	▲3	▼1
Popular vote	297,830	174,838
Percentage	21.4%	12.6%
Swing	▲0.4 pp	▼1.7 pp

On Thursday 5 May 2005, the 2005 United Kingdom general election was held in Wales, to elect all 646 members of the House of Commons, with 40 constituencies being in Wales.

== Candidates ==
Below is a table summarising the candidates of the 2005 general election in Wales.

Affiliation	Candidates
Labour Party	40
Conservative and Unionist Party	40
Liberal Democrats	40
Plaid Cymru	40
UK Independence Party	31
Independent	12
Green Party of England and Wales	11
Legalise Cannabis Alliance	7
Forward Wales	6
Socialist Labour Party	6
Rainbow Dream Ticket	4
Veritas	3
British National Party	2
Respect Party	2
Socialist Party	2
Communist Party of Britain	2
Liberal Party	1
New Millennium Bean Party	1
Total	250

== Outcome and changes ==
The election saw Labour lose ground in Wales although it still won 29 of Wales' 40 constituencies and 42.7% of the vote. In what the BBC described as a "sensational defeat". Labour lost Blaenau Gwent, its "safest seat in Wales" to Independent Peter Law, a member of the Welsh Assembly who had left Labour to contest the election following a dispute about the use of an all-women shortlist in the selection of Labour's candidate.

Plaid Cymru, also fell back losing Ceredigion (to the Liberal Democrats) and failing to regain Ynys Môn which they had narrowly lost to Labour in 2001. This followed on from what the BBC described as "a poor performance" by Plaid Cymru at the 2003 National Assembly for Wales election, when it was reduced from 17 seats to 12. Elfyn Llwyd, Plaid Cymru's parliamentary leader who was re-elected as MP for Meirionnydd Nant Conwy, said the result was "extremely disappointing". However he also stated that while the result was "a set back...but it's not half as bad as the media speculation would suggest", noting he and Plaid's two other MPs increased their majorities, and that "If 1,400 votes had gone the other way, we would have won Ynys Mon and held Ceredigion."

The Conservatives made three gains from Labour (Clwyd West, Preseli Pembrokeshire and Monmouth, the first time there had been Conservative MPs from Welsh constituencies since the party had been wiped out in Wales in the 1997 election. The Shadow Secretary of State for Wales, Bill Wiggin, said after the result "Never again will Wales be a Conservative-free zone". However, the Conservatives failed to win two other target Labour-held seats, Vale of Glamorgan and Cardiff North, which the BBC described as "disappointments" for them, and Wiggin admitted that he would have liked the Party to win more seats in Wales.

The Liberal Democrats gained two seats (taking Cardiff Central from Labour in addition to their gain of Ceredigion), thereby doubling their Welsh total to four seats. Lembit Öpik, the Welsh Liberal Democrats leader, described this as a "fantastic night" for his party in Wales, and called their gaining of Ceredigion the "result of the night". He also added that by having the second highest number of Welsh MPs the Welsh Liberal Democrats were now "the official opposition" to Labour at Westminster.

== Results ==
Below is a table summarising the results of the 2005 general election in Wales.

Party	Seats					Aggregate votes		
Party	Total	Gains	Losses	Net	Of all (%)	Total	Of all (%)	Change (%)
Labour	29	0	5	▼5	72.5	594,821	42.7	▼5.9
Conservative	3	3	0	▲3	7.5	297,830	21.4	▲1.8
Liberal Democrats	4	2	0	▲2	10.0	256,249	18.4	▲4.6
Plaid Cymru	3	0	1	▼1	7.5	174,838	12.6	▼1.7
Independent	1	1	0	▲1	2.5	28,888	2.1	▲0.6
UKIP	0	0	0	Steady	—	20,297	1.5	▲0.6
Green	0	0	0	Steady	—	7,144	0.5	▲0.2
Forward Wales	0	New			—	3,461	0.2	New
Legalise Cannabis	0	New			—	1,772	0.1	New
BNP	0	0	0	Steady	—	1,689	0.1	▲0.1
Socialist Labour	0	0	0	Steady	—	1,605	0.1	▼0.1
Veritas	0	New			—	1,437	0.1	New
Respect	0	New			—	643	0.0	New
Liberal	0	New			—	605	0.0	New
Socialist	0	New			—	557	0.0	New
Communist	0	0	0	Steady	—	440	0.0	Steady
Rainbow Dream Ticket	0	New			—	284	0.0	New
New Millennium Bean	0	0	0	Steady	—	159	0.0	Steady
Total	40			0	100.0	1,392,719	100.0	0.0
Registered voters, and turnout						2,224,650	62.6	▲1.0

Popular vote
Labour	42.7%
Conservative	21.4%
Liberal Democrats	18.4%
Plaid Cymru	12.6%
Independent	2.1%
UKIP	1.5%
Green	0.5%
Other	0.9%

Parliament seats
Labour	72.5%
Conservative	10.0%
Liberal Democrats	10.0%
Plaid Cymru	7.5%
Independent	2.5%

== See also ==
- 2005 United Kingdom general election in England
- 2005 United Kingdom general election in Scotland
- 2005 United Kingdom general election in Northern Ireland
- List of MPs for constituencies in Wales (2005–2010)
