= List of parties contesting the 2005 United Kingdom general election =

In the 2005 general election, numerous minor or single issue candidates stood for election. Due to the first past the post electoral system, national fourth parties are rarely successful in achieving representation in the House of Commons. A notable exception is the case of parties in Scotland and Wales, such as the Scottish National Party or Plaid Cymru, who have gained a number of seats.

Parties listed below are organised firstly by the nations and regions in which they are standing, then the number of MPs elected in the 2001 general election, then by number of candidates standing in the 2005 election, and finally alphabetically. As a result, parties attracting more support will tend to appear higher in each list than fringe parties.

== Parties standing in England and Wales ==
There are well over 500 seats in England and Wales, with the Labour Party and Conservative Party standing in every one, and the Liberal Democrats standing aside only against Health Concern. UKIP also contested the majority of seats, while Plaid Cymru stood in every seat in Wales. Thirty further parties stood in more than one seat, while others contested a single constituency.

Parties that won seats in 2001

- Labour Party (569 candidates in 2005)
- Conservative Party (569)
- Liberal Democrats (568)
- Plaid Cymru (40)
- Independent Kidderminster Hospital and Health Concern (1) - Often abbreviated to Health Concern.

Other parties

- United Kingdom Independence Party (475 candidates in 2005)
- Green Party of England and Wales (182)
- British National Party (117)
- Veritas (66)
- Socialist Labour Party (SLP) (40)
- RESPECT The Unity Coalition (26)
- English Democrats Party (25)
- Legalise Cannabis Alliance (20)
- Official Monster Raving Loony Party (20)
- Vote For Yourself Rainbow Dream Ticket (17)
- Socialist Alternative (17)
- Liberal Party (13)
- National Front (13)
- Workers' Revolutionary Party (10)
- Christian Peoples Alliance (9)
- Alliance for Green Socialism (5)
- Communist Party of Britain (5)
- Forward Wales (5)
- Community Action Party (4)
- Mebyon Kernow (4)
- Alliance for Change (3)
- Clause 28 Children's Protection Christian Democrats (3)
- Peace and Progress (3)
- People's Choice Making Politicians Work (3)
- Progressive Democratic Party (3)
- UK Community Issues Party (3)
- Democratic Socialist Alliance (2)
- Peace Party (2)
- S-O-S! Voters Against Overdevelopment of Northampton (2)
- Senior Citizens Party (2)
- Socialist Unity (2)
- Third Way (2)
- Your Party (2). (January 2004–April 2006). Founded by four dotcom entrepreneurs, the party sought to canvass ideas from online "participants" before formulating a set of policies, a form of direct democracy. It contested two seats at the 2005 general election, then deregistered in April 2006.
- Alternative Party (politics) (1)
- Baths Party (1)
- Bean Party (1)
- Blair Must Go Party (1)
- Bridges Party (1)
- British Public Party (1)
- Burnley Party (1)
- Campaigning for Real Democracy (1)
- Church of the Militant Elvis Party (1)
- Community Group (1)
- Community Party (1)
- Civilisation Party (1)
- Croydon Pensions Alliance (1)
- Death, Dungeons and Taxes Party (1)
- Democratic Labour Party (1)
- English Independence Party (1)
- English Parliamentary Party (1)
- Families First UK (1)
- Fit for Integrity and Trust (1)
- Forum Party (1)
- Freedom Party (1)
- Get Britain Back (1)
- Good Party (1)
- Honesty Party (1)
- Imperial Party (1)
- Iraq War, Not In My Name (1)
- Independent Working Class Association (1)
- Islam Zinda Baad Platform (1)
- Justice Party (1)
- Local Community Party (1)
- Max Power Party (1)
- Millennium Council (1)
- Motorcycle News Party (1)
- Newcastle Academy With Christian Values Party (1)
- New England Party (1)
- Northern Progress For You (1)
- People's Justice Party (1)
- Personality And Rational Thinking? Yes! Party (1)
- Protest Vote Party (1)
- Removal of Tetra Masts in Cornwall (1)
- Resolutionist Party (1)
- St Albans Party (1)
- Save the National Health (1)
- Seeks A Worldwide Online Participatory Democracy (1)
- Silent Majority Party (1)
- Socialist Party of Great Britain (1)
- Telepathic Partnership (1)
- Their Party (1)
- Tigers Eye the Party for Kids (1)
- UK Pathfinders Party (1)
- UK Pensioners Party (1)
- Xtraordinary People Party (1)
- Wessex Regionalist Party (1)

Notes

1. The previously elected UK Parliamentary representative of this party (George Galloway) was elected under the banner of the Labour Party.
2. Stood as part of the English Democrats Alliance.

== Parties standing in Northern Ireland ==
There are eighteen seats in Northern Ireland, and four parties stood in every seat. These parties do not stand in the rest of the UK; although the Democratic Unionist Party has briefly held a mainland Westminster seat due to a defection, and Sinn Féin also stands in the Republic of Ireland. Three other Northern Ireland-only parties stood, while the Conservative Party and Vote For Yourself Rainbow Dream Ticket also put up candidates.

Parties that won seats in 2001

- Ulster Unionist Party (18 candidates in 2005) - Unionist
- Democratic Unionist Party (18) - Unionist
- Sinn Féin (18) - Republican
- Social Democratic and Labour Party (18) - Nationalist

Other parties

- Alliance Party of Northern Ireland (12 candidates in 2005)
- Vote For Yourself Rainbow Dream Ticket (6)
- Workers' Party (6)
- Conservative Party (3)
- Socialist Environmental Alliance (1)

== Parties standing in Scotland ==
There are fifty-nine seats in Scotland. The SNP stood in every one, while Labour, the Conservatives and Lib Dems did not contest the Speaker's seat and the SSP did not stand against the independent candidate Rose Gentle. Several other parties stood in a smaller selection of constituencies.

Parties that won seats in 2001

- Labour Party (58 candidates in 2005)
- Liberal Democrats (58)
- Scottish National Party (59)
- Conservative and Unionist Party (58)
- Speaker (1)

Other parties

- Scottish Socialist Party (58 candidates in 2005)
- UK Independence Party (21)
- Scottish Green Party (20)
- Operation Christian Vote (10)
- Socialist Labour Party (SLP) (10)
- Free Scotland Party (3)
- British National Party (2)
- Scottish Senior Citizens Unity Party (2)
- Communist Party of Britain (1)
- Death, Dungeons and Taxes Party (1)
- Independent Green Voice (1)
- Legalise Cannabis Alliance (1)
- Liberal Party (1)
- Pride in Paisley Party (1)
- Publican Party (1)
- Scottish Independence Party (1)
- Scottish Pensioners Party (1)
- Scottish Unionist Party (1)
