= 1981 North Down Borough Council election =

Northern Ireland local election

← 1977	20 May 1981	1985 →

All 20 seats to North Down Borough Council 11 seats needed for a majority
	First party	Second party	Third party
Party	Alliance	DUP	UUP
Seats won	6	5	4
Seat change	▼1	▲4	▼3
	Fourth party	Fifth party	Sixth party
Party	UPUP	Unionist Party NI	Ind. Unionist
Seats won	3	1	1
Seat change	▲3	0	0
	Seventh party	Eighth party
Party	Vanguard	UUUP
Seats won	0	0
Seat change	▼2	▼1

Elections to North Down Borough Council were held on 20 May 1981 on the same day as the other Northern Irish local government elections. The election used four district electoral areas to elect a total of 20 councillors.

== Election results ==
North Down Borough Council Election Result 1981
Party	Seats	Gains	Losses	Net gain/loss	Seats %	Votes %	Votes	+/−
Alliance	6	0	1	▼1	30.0	25.2	6,132	▼13.3
DUP	5	4	0	▲4	25.0	23.7	5,766	▲15.4
UUP	4	0	3	▼3	20.0	22.6	5,477	▼4.7
UPUP	3	3	0	▲3	15.0	17.6	4,272	New
Ind. Unionist	1	0	0	0	5.0	6.1	1,477	▲1.7
Unionist Party NI	1	0	0	0	5.0	3.8	892	▼5.4
PUP	0	0	0	0	0.0	1.1	270	New

Note: "Votes" are the first preference votes.

== Districts summary ==
Results of the North Down Borough Council election, 1981 by district
Ward	%	Cllrs	%	Cllrs	%	Cllrs	%	Cllrs	%	Cllrs	%	Cllrs	Total Cllrs
Ward	Alliance		DUP		UUP		UPUP		UPNI		Others		Total Cllrs
Area A	26.4	1	19.3	1	18.7	1	7.6	0	10.3	1	17.7	1	5
Area B	15.0	1	36.7	2	11.3	0	29.1	2	0.0	0	7.9	0	5
Area C	31.7	2	21.3	1	23.8	1	23.2	1	0.0	0	0.0	0	5
Area D	30.1	2	15.3	1	41.1	2	9.9	0	3.5	0	0.0	0	5
Total	25.2	6	23.7	5	22.6	4	17.6	3	3.8	1	7.1	1	20

== Districts results ==
=== Area A ===
1977: 2 x Alliance, 1 x UUP, 1 x UPNI, 1 x Independent Unionist
1981: 1 x Alliance, 1 x UUP, 1 x UPNI, 1 x DUP, 1 x Independent Unionist
1977-1981 Change: DUP gain from Alliance

North Down Area A - 5 seats
Party	Candidate	FPv%	Count									
Party	Candidate	FPv%	1	2	3	4	5	6	7	8	9	10
Ind. Unionist	Edmund Mills*	17.64%	1,216									
DUP	Raymond Trousdale	10.74%	740	742	744.8	752.9	753.9	794.55	1,356.55			
UUP	Bruce Mulligan*	10.05%	693	696	701.1	715.35	720.4	784.45	826.3	900.78	1,391.78	
Unionist Party NI	William Bailie*	9.50%	655	680	691.2	700.55	707.65	796.95	812.35	860.51	1,036.64	1,218.14
Alliance	Donald Hayes	11.78%	812	821	825.95	834.05	984.35	1,023.6	1,024.65	1,034.17	1,053.48	1,092.48
Alliance	Jane Copeland	10.30%	710	713	716.15	726.2	856.5	880	888.05	893.65	910.32	932.07
UUP	George Allport	8.78%	605	609	618.25	631.6	632.75	703.75	728.75	798.19		
DUP	Elizabeth Loan	8.59%	592	592	594.6	612.75	612.85	672.45				
UPUP	Valerie Kinghan	4.05%	279	284	288.3	448.2	450.25					
Alliance	Julian Hamilton	4.32%	298	300	301.1	302.1						
UPUP	Margaret McGimpsey	3.58%	247	250	253.4							
Unionist Party NI	Dorothy Smith	0.81%	56									
Electorate: 12,648 Valid: 6,893 (54.50%) Spoilt: 176 Quota: 1,149 Turnout: 7,067 (55.87%)

=== Area B ===
1977: 2 x UUP, 1 x DUP, 1 x Alliance, 1 x Vanguard
1981: 2 x DUP, 2 x UPUP, 1 x Alliance
1977-1981 Change: UPUP (two seats) and DUP gain from UUP (two seats) and Vanguard

North Down Area B - 5 seats
Party	Candidate	FPv%	Count											
Party	Candidate	FPv%	1	2	3	4	5	6	7	8	9	10	11	12
UPUP	George Green*	17.95%	1,200											
DUP	Wesley Graham	14.54%	972	975	978.99	986.41	1,005.11	1,026.18	1,029.18	1,052.6	1,082.74	1,406.79		
DUP	John McCormick	12.28%	821	823	828.18	835.39	857.02	893.23	895.37	909.07	927.49	1,273.82		
Alliance	James Magee*	10.96%	733	733	737.76	739.32	761.51	766.51	1,006.58	1,031.91	1,060.17	1,064.31	1,075.31	1,090.78
UPUP	Cecil Braniff	4.58%	306	313	324.03	473.79	488.93	561.54	566.68	749.1	782.57	805.92	891.92	980.19
UUP	Chalmers Quee	5.77%	386	387	393.72	397.42	443.26	455.47	463.89	495.15	771.25	792.67	851.67	906.27
DUP	George McMurtry	9.91%	663	667	669.8	674.35	693.71	719.78	721.92	734.34	746.69			
UUP	Phyllis Brown	5.53%	370	373	376.92	388.69	417.25	429.39	441.46	454.65				
UPUP	William Elliott	3.50%	234	236	251.19	273.93	305.42	319.63	325.63					
Alliance	Anne Wilson	4.01%	268	268	268.7	269.84	286.26	288.26						
PUP	Thomas O'Brien	4.04%	270	272	273.4	276.54	285.75							
Ind. Unionist	John Shields*	3.48%	233	235	241.44	246.28								
UPUP	James Boyle*	3.04%	203	205	224.39									
Ind. Unionist	William Johnston	0.42%	28											
Electorate: 14,099 Valid: 6,687 (47.43%) Spoilt: 201 Quota: 1,115 Turnout: 6,888 (48.85%)

=== Area C ===
1977: 2 x Alliance, 2 x UUP, 1 x Vanguard
1981: 2 x Alliance, 1 x UUP, 1 x UPUP, 1 x DUP
1977-1981 Change: UPUP and DUP gain from UUP and Vanguard

North Down Area C - 5 seats
Party	Candidate	FPv%	Count							
Party	Candidate	FPv%	1	2	3	4	5	6	7	8
UPUP	Mary O'Fee*	18.28%	1,021							
Alliance	William Morrow*	17.17%	959							
DUP	Alan Graham	16.24%	929	932.92						
UUP	Hazel Bradford*	16.24%	907	916.36	976.84					
Alliance	Brian Wilson	7.95%	444	447.6	454.68	464.68	459.94	460.02	776.08	834.24
UUP	Terence McKeag	7.56%	422	428.55	471.72	512.72	513.32	514.16	551.04	765.48
UPUP	Maisie McMullan*	4.89%	273	324.44	390	392	392.62	393.38	415.78	
Alliance	Thomas Rollins*	6.57%	367	370.84	378.84	378.84	391.18	391.18		
DUP	George McKinnie	4.71%	263	264.75						
Electorate: 10,215 Valid: 5,585 (54.67%) Spoilt: 135 Quota: 931 Turnout: 5,720 (56.00%)

=== Area D ===
1977: 2 x UUP, 2 x Alliance, 1 x UUUP
1981: 2 x UUP, 2 x Alliance, 1 x DUP
1977-1981 Change: DUP gain from UUUP

North Down Area D - 5 seats
Party	Candidate	FPv%	Count								
Party	Candidate	FPv%	1	2	3	4	5	6	7	8	9
UUP	Ellie McKay	21.01%	1,076								
UUP	John Auld*	15.68%	803	887.84							
DUP	Gordon Dunne	9.94%	509	524.54	534.96	542.59	804.16	882.16			
Alliance	Susan O'Brien	14.20%	727	738.97	741.39	751.81	752.23	764.38	767.89	769.13	841.13
Alliance	Michael Clarke	8.26%	423	426.15	429.36	439.2	440.2	457.77	470.11	470.11	799.11
UPUP	Frederick White*	7.30%	374	389.75	497.43	552.48	566.11	667.53	686.9	710.46	722.46
Alliance	Irene Cave	7.64%	391	396.46	398.46	418.3	419.3	449.29	455.66	458.76	
UUP	Thomas Bussell*	4.39%	225	288.42	293.68	358.2	369.3				
DUP	Edith Cole	5.41%	277	283.72	287.93	297.35					
Unionist Party NI	Trevor Boyd	3.53%	181	187.51	191.93						
UPUP	Eric Griffith	2.64%	135	139.83							
Electorate: 9,205 Valid: 5,121 (55.63%) Spoilt: 125 Quota: 854 Turnout: 5,246 (56.99%)
