= 1993 North Down Borough Council election =

Northern Ireland local election

← 1989	19 May 1993	1997 →

All 25 seats to North Down Borough Council 13 seats needed for a majority
	First party	Second party	Third party
Party	UUP	Alliance	NI Conservatives
Seats won	6	5	4
Seat change	▲1	▲1	▼2
	Fourth party	Fifth party	Sixth party
Party	DUP	Ind. Unionist	Independent
Seats won	3	3	2
Seat change	▼1	▲2	0
	Seventh party
Party	UPUP
Seats won	2
Seat change	0
- Party with the most votes by district.

Elections to North Down Borough Council were held on 19 May 1993 on the same day as the other Northern Irish local government elections. The election used four district electoral areas to elect a total of 25 councillors.

== Election results ==
North Down Borough Council Election Result 1993
Party	Seats	Gains	Losses	Net gain/loss	Seats %	Votes %	Votes	+/−
UUP	6	1	0	▲2	24.0	18.7	3,709	▼3.0
Alliance	5	1	0	▲1	20.0	22.7	4,520	▲2.0
NI Conservatives	4	0	2	▼2	16.0	11.1	2,198	▼13.8
DUP	3	0	1	▼1	12.0	16.2	3,218	▲0.7
Ind. Unionist	3	3	1	▲2	12.0	12.4	2,467	▲9.6
Independent	2	1	1	0	8.0	13.0	2,585	▲6.1
UPUP	2	0	0	0	8.0	5.9	1,173	0.0

Note: "Votes" are the first preference votes.

== Districts summary ==
Results of the North Down Borough Council election, 1993 by district
Ward	%	Cllrs	%	Cllrs	%	Cllrs	%	Cllrs	%	Cllrs	%	Cllrs	Total Cllrs
Ward	UUP		Alliance		Conservative		DUP		UPUP		Others		Total Cllrs
Abbey	15.5	1	15.5	1	9.3	1	20.6	1	29.8	2	9.3	0	6
Ballyholme and Groomsport	19.0	2	18.0	1	9.8	1	14.1	1	0.0	0	39.1	2	7
Bangor West	20.5	1	32.7	2	12.9	1	18.8	1	0.0	0	15.1	1	7
Holywood	18.9	1	22.9	1	11.9	1	11.8	0	0.0	0	34.5	2	5
Total	24.9	6	21.7	5	20.7	4	15.5	4	5.9	2	11.3	3	25

== Districts results ==
=== Abbey ===
1989: 2 x UPUP, 1 x DUP, 1 x Alliance, 1 x UUP, 1 x Conservative
1993: 2 x UPUP, 1 x DUP, 1 x Alliance, 1 x UUP, 1 x Conservative
1989-1993 Change: No change

Abbey - 6 seats
Party	Candidate	FPv%	Count					
Party	Candidate	FPv%	1	2	3	4	5	6
UPUP	Valerie Kinghan*	18.26%	719					
Alliance	Stephen Farry	15.52%	611					
UUP	Irene Cree*	14.45%	408	539	569.13			
UPUP	Cecil Braniff*	11.53%	454	468	537.92	546.83	635.83	
NI Conservatives	Ann Thompson	9.34%	368	386	408.08	419.06	508.58	530.58
DUP	Ivy Cooling	10.41%	410	423	437.26	438.16	471.8	479.8
DUP	Geoffrey Bairsto	10.41%	403	412	420.28	421.9	442.94	460.94
Independent	William Gordon	9.29%	366	372	381.89	403.85		
UUP	Karl McLean	5.05%	199					
Electorate: 12,961 Valid: 3,938 (30.38%) Spoilt: 133 Quota: 563 Turnout: 4,071 (31.41%)

=== Ballyholme and Groomsport ===
1989: 2 x Conservative, 1 x UUP, 1 x Alliance, 1 x DUP, 1 x Independent Unionist
1993: 2 x UUP, 2 x Independent Unionist, 1 x Alliance, 1 x DUP, 1 x Conservative
1989-1993 Change: UUP and Independent Unionist gain from Conservative and due to the addition of one seat

Ballyholme and Groomsport - 7 seats
Party	Candidate	FPv%	Count								
Party	Candidate	FPv%	1	2	3	4	5	6	7	8	9
Ind. Unionist	Alan Chambers	32.04%	1,892								
DUP	Raymond Stewart	14.06%	830								
UUP	Leslie Cree*	11.50%	679	925.37							
Alliance	Marsden Fitzsimons	11.04%	652	838.73							
NI Conservatives	Bruce Mulligan*	5.52%	326	389.19	397.38	403.68	408.62	466.44	614.27	683.9	732.7
UUP	Ian Henry	3.57%	211	283.42	384.22	389.26	432.29	437.55	452.2	477.96	719.58
Ind. Unionist	Austen Lennon	4.89%	289	582.94	590.5	600.58	603.7	612.54	617.67	666.14	690.56
Alliance	Siobhan Laird	6.98%	412	421.23	426.9	487.38	488.81	496.07	501.07	538.24	557.49
UUP	James Kingan	3.88%	229	332.66	380.54	385.58	409.89	423.67	428.48	457.33	
Independent	Joseph Thompson	2.22%	131	240.34	247.9	253.36	258.56	268.92	282.65		
NI Conservatives	Bill McLean	2.30%	136	162.27	168.57	169.83	172.04	212.89			
NI Conservatives	William Palmer	2.00%	118	154.21	155.47	159.25	165.62				
Electorate: 15,787 Valid: 5,905 (37.40%) Spoilt: 110 Quota: 739 Turnout: 6,015 (38.10%)

=== Bangor West ===
1989: 2 x Conservative, 2 x UUP, 1 x Alliance, 1 x DUP, 1 x Independent
1993: 2 x Alliance, 2 x UUP, 1 x DUP, 1 x Conservative, 1 x Independent Unionist
1989-1993 Change: Alliance and Independent Unionist gain from Conservative and Independent

Bangor West - 7 seats
Party	Candidate	FPv%	Count											
Party	Candidate	FPv%	1	2	3	4	5	6	7	8	9	10	11	12
Alliance	Brian Wilson*	21.91%	1,228											
DUP	William Baxter*	14.36%	805											
UUP	Hazel Bradford*	13.45%	754											
Alliance	Eileen Bell	10.76%	603	969.93										
UUP	Roy Bradford*	7.03%	394	418.64	449.04	456.32	498.67	508.46	508.46	511.24	520.32	532.92	557.6	701.43
Ind. Unionist	Ian Sinclair	5.10%	286	313.72	352.12	353.29	354.41	368.68	378.85	392.02	423.55	488.67	563.26	615.52
NI Conservatives	George Green*	6.10%	342	357.4	376.2	379.71	381.67	385.47	391.27	436.38	443.62	458.9	480.58	508.31
NI Conservatives	James O'Fee*	4.76%	267	295.16	325.56	325.95	327.77	335.57	339.17	399.07	405.35	422.39	467.67	485.3
DUP	Harold Blemings	4.41%	247	263.28	272.48	358.54	360.64	361.64	362.64	363.59	371.13	379.57	389.97	
Independent	Ann-Marie Foster*	2.64%	148	157.68	218.48	218.74	219.02	226.1	246.34	249.94	285.66	361.6		
Independent	Arthur Gadd	2.05%	115	123.8	143.4	143.79	143.93	149.37	210.64	212.64	260.33			
Independent	Ernest Steele	2.59%	145	157.32	174.12	174.77	174.91	180.31	194.63	194.63				
NI Conservatives	Elizabeth Maguire	2.02%	113	120.04	132.84	133.88	134.72	137.52	137.52					
Independent	Robert Mooney	1.80%	101	105.4	121.4	121.53	121.67	125.87						
Independent	Edward Lindsay	1.03%	58	61.96	72.76	72.89	72.96							
Electorate: 15,097 Valid: 5,606 (37.13%) Spoilt: 189 Quota: 701 Turnout: 5,795 (38.39%)

=== Holywood ===
1989: 1 x Alliance, 1 x Conservative, 1 x UUP, 1 x DUP, 1 x Independent
1993: 2 x Independent, 1 x Alliance, 1 x UUP, 1 x Conservative
1989-1993 Change: Independent gain from DUP

Holywood - 5 seats
Party	Candidate	FPv%	Count					
Party	Candidate	FPv%	1	2	3	4	5	6
Independent	Dennis Ogborn*	19.70%	871					
UUP	Ellie McKay*	18.89%	835					
Alliance	Susan O'Brien*	15.27%	675	721.24	723.73	738		
Independent	James White	7.69%	340	353.76	358.92	366.84	623.76	737.76
NI Conservatives	Laurence Kennedy*	9.36%	414	442.48	524.56	551.92	565.56	680.68
DUP	Gordon Dunne*	11.83%	523	537.4	548.88	582	600.96	615.76
Alliance	John Coates	7.67%	339	354.68	364.84	369.88	382.44	
Independent	Robert Irvine	7.01%	310	318.16	322.16	327.8		
NI Conservatives	Lindsay Cumming	2.58%	114	117.68				
Electorate: 10,411 Valid: 4,421 (42.46%) Spoilt: 89 Quota: 737 Turnout: 4,510 (43.32%)
