= North Down Area C =

District electoral areas in North Down, Northern Ireland

North Down Area C was one of the four district electoral areas in North Down, Northern Ireland which existed from 1973 to 1985. The district elected five members to North Down Borough Council, and formed part of the North Down constituencies for the Northern Ireland Assembly and UK Parliament.

It was created for the 1973 local elections, and contained the wards of Bangor Castle, Bryansburn, Crawfordsburn, Princestown and Springhill. It was abolished for the 1985 local elections and replaced by the Bangor West DEA and the Abbey DEA.

== Councillors ==
Election	Councillor (Party)	Councillor (Party)	Councillor (Party)	Councillor (Party)	Councillor (Party)
1981	Mary O'Fee (UPUP)/ (Vanguard)/ (Loyalist)	Alan Graham (DUP)	Hazel Bradford (UUP)	William Morrow (Alliance)	Brian Wilson (Alliance)
1977	Mary O'Fee (UPUP)/ (Vanguard)/ (Loyalist)	Maisie McMullan (UUP)	Hazel Bradford (UUP)	William Morrow (Alliance)	Thomas Rollins (Alliance)
1973	Mary O'Fee (UPUP)/ (Vanguard)/ (Loyalist)	Robert Campbell (UUP)	David Belshaw (UUP)	John Calvert (Alliance)	Jean Foster (Alliance)

== 1981 Election ==
1977: 2 x Alliance, 2 x UUP, 1 x Vanguard

1981: 2 x Alliance, 1 x UUP, 1 x UPUP, 1 x DUP

1977-1981 Change: UPUP and DUP gain from UUP and Vanguard

North Down Area C - 5 seats
Party	Candidate	FPv%	Count							
Party	Candidate	FPv%	1	2	3	4	5	6	7	8
UPUP	Mary O'Fee*	18.28%	1,021							
Alliance	William Morrow*	17.17%	959							
DUP	Alan Graham	16.24%	929	932.92						
UUP	Hazel Bradford*	16.24%	907	916.36	976.84					
Alliance	Brian Wilson	7.95%	444	447.6	454.68	464.68	459.94	460.02	776.08	834.24
UUP	Terence McKeag	7.56%	422	428.55	471.72	512.72	513.32	514.16	551.04	765.48
UPUP	Maisie McMullan*	4.89%	273	324.44	390	392	392.62	393.38	415.78	
Alliance	Thomas Rollins*	6.57%	367	370.84	378.84	378.84	391.18	391.18		
DUP	George McKinnie	4.71%	263	264.75						
Electorate: 10,215 Valid: 5,585 (54.67%) Spoilt: 135 Quota: 931 Turnout: 5,720 (56.00%)

== 1977 Election ==
1973: 2 x Alliance, 2 x UUP, 1 x Loyalist

1977: 2 x Alliance, 2 x UUP, 1 x Vanguard

1973-1977 Change: Loyalist joins Vanguard

North Down Area C - 5 seats
Party	Candidate	FPv%	Count						
Party	Candidate	FPv%	1	2	3	4	5	6	7
UUP	Hazel Bradford	14.05%	635	717	793				
Alliance	William Morrow	15.95%	721	725	791				
Vanguard	Mary O'Fee*	12.17%	550	565	624	630.6	797.6		
Alliance	Thomas Rollins	14.09%	637	643	701	707.6	710.6	711.04	732.16
UUP	Maisie McMullan	7.19%	325	439	496	519.1	662.1	703.9	709.02
Alliance	Jane Copeland	13.96%	631	635	674	676.2	680.2	681.52	691.76
DUP	Alan Graham	8.87%	401	413	423	423			
Unionist Party NI	Frank Gill	8.16%	369	376					
UUP	Archibald Pollock	5.55%	251						
Electorate: 9,940 Valid: 4,520 (45.47%) Spoilt: 77 Quota: 754 Turnout: 4,597 (46.25%)

== 1973 Election ==
1973: 2 x Alliance, 2 x UUP, 1 x Loyalist

North Down Area C - 5 seats
Party	Candidate	FPv%	Count							
Party	Candidate	FPv%	1	2	3	4	5	6	7	8
UUP	Robert Campbell	21.86%	1,352							
UUP	David Belshaw	11.95%	739	853.17	864.23	868.69	879.92	887.84	1,040.65	
Alliance	John Calvert	12.76%	789	797.05	808.05	844.05	844.05	975.43	988.58	1,080.58
Loyalist	Mary O'Fee	10.32%	638	655.94	672.4	677.63	941.7	943.93	966.46	1,071.46
Alliance	Jean Foster	11.06%	684	695.73	726.73	793.96	799.42	974.88	989.41	1,044.82
Independent	James Stark	8.18%	506	522.56	546.79	573.79	577.02	588.71	614.7	735.76
Ind. Unionist	Henry Garner	5.09%	315	376.64	380.87	383.87	390.56	397.56	534.55	
UUP	Henry Patton	4.43%	274	342.08	347.77	347.77	351.23	356.46		
Alliance	Thomas Rollins	5.01%	310	313.91	328.91	341.91	341.91			
Loyalist	Christopher Millar	4.62%	286	290.14	294.14	296.14				
NI Labour	Harold Parkhill	2.39%	148	148.92	170.92					
Independent	Brian Wilson	2.31%	143	145.3						
Electorate: 9,067 Valid: 6,184 (68.20%) Spoilt: 53 Quota: 1,031 Turnout: 6,237 (68.79%)
