= North Down Area A =

District electoral areas in North Down, Northern Ireland

North Down Area A was one of the four district electoral areas in North Down, Northern Ireland which existed from 1973 to 1985. The district elected five members to North Down Borough Council, and formed part of the North Down constituencies for the Northern Ireland Assembly and UK Parliament.

It was created for the 1973 local elections, and contained the wards of Ballyholme, Ballymagee, Bangor Harbour, Churchill and Groomsport. It was abolished for the 1985 local elections and replaced by the Ballyholme and Groomsport DEA.

== Councillors ==
Election	Councillor (Party)	Councillor (Party)	Councillor (Party)	Councillor (Party)	Councillor (Party)
1981	Edmund Mills (Independent Unionist)/ (UUP)	William Bailie (UPNI)	Bruce Mulligan (UUP)	Raymond Truesdale (DUP)	Donald Hayes (Alliance)
1977	Edmund Mills (Independent Unionist)/ (UUP)	William Bailie (UPNI)	Thomas Barkley (UUP)	James Hamilton (Alliance)	Bertie McConnell (Alliance)
1973	Edmund Mills (Independent Unionist)/ (UUP)	Robert Topping (UUP)	Maurice Butler (UUP)	James Hamilton (Alliance)	Bertie McConnell (Alliance)

== 1981 Election ==
1977: 2 x Alliance, 1 x UUP, 1 x UPNI, 1 x Independent Unionist

1981: 1 x Alliance, 1 x UUP, 1 x UPNI, 1 x DUP, 1 x Independent Unionist

1977-1981 Change: DUP gain from Alliance

North Down Area A - 5 seats
Party	Candidate	FPv%	Count									
Party	Candidate	FPv%	1	2	3	4	5	6	7	8	9	10
Ind. Unionist	Edmund Mills*	17.64%	1,216									
DUP	Raymond Trousdale	10.74%	740	742	744.8	752.9	753.9	794.55	1,356.55			
UUP	Bruce Mulligan*	10.05%	693	696	701.1	715.35	720.4	784.45	826.3	900.78	1,391.78	
Unionist Party NI	William Bailie*	9.50%	655	680	691.2	700.55	707.65	796.95	812.35	860.51	1,036.64	1,218.14
Alliance	Donald Hayes	11.78%	812	821	825.95	834.05	984.35	1,023.6	1,024.65	1,034.17	1,053.48	1,092.48
Alliance	Jane Copeland	10.30%	710	713	716.15	726.2	856.5	880	888.05	893.65	910.32	932.07
UUP	George Allport	8.78%	605	609	618.25	631.6	632.75	703.75	728.75	798.19		
DUP	Elizabeth Loan	8.59%	592	592	594.6	612.75	612.85	672.45				
UPUP	Valerie Kinghan	4.05%	279	284	288.3	448.2	450.25					
Alliance	Julian Hamilton	4.32%	298	300	301.1	302.1						
UPUP	Margaret McGimpsey	3.58%	247	250	253.4							
Unionist Party NI	Dorothy Smith	0.81%	56									
Electorate: 12,648 Valid: 6,893 (54.50%) Spoilt: 176 Quota: 1,149 Turnout: 7,067 (55.87%)

== 1977 Election ==
1973: 3 x UUP, 2 x Alliance

1977: 2 x Alliance, 1 x UUP, 1 x UPNI, 1 x Independent Unionist

1973-1977 Change: UPNI and Independent Unionist gain from UUP (two seats)

North Down Area A - 5 seats
Party	Candidate	FPv%	Count					
Party	Candidate	FPv%	1	2	3	4	5	6
Alliance	Bertie McConnell*	23.71%	1,372					
Unionist Party NI	William Bailie	20.38%	1,179					
Ind. Unionist	Edmund Mills*	14.45%	836	863	943.37	980.37		
Alliance	James Hamilton*	7.17%	415	667.9	703.81	711.78	729.06	1,074.06
UUP	Thomas Barkley	8.14%	471	478.8	516.23	595.41	933.1	941.1
DUP	Sammy Wilson	10.82%	626	628.7	636.11	645.11	663.53	666.53
Alliance	Clifford Creighton	6.33%	366	472.2	492.53	494.21	502.35	
UUP	Hugh Irvine	4.84%	280	286.3	304.35	415.1		
UUP	Lillie Navan	4.17%	241	244.9	257.44			
Electorate: 11,231 Valid: 5,786 (51.52%) Spoilt: 121 Quota: 965 Turnout: 5,907 (52.60%)

== 1973 Election ==
1973: 3 x UUP, 2 x Alliance

North Down Area A - 5 seats
Party	Candidate	FPv%	Count							
Party	Candidate	FPv%	1	2	3	4	5	6	7	8
UUP	Robert Topping	25.99%	1,786							
UUP	Maurice Butler	14.20%	976	1,180.8						
Alliance	Bertie McConnell	15.35%	1,055	1,090.35	1,102.55	1,103.99	1,109.49	1,248.49		
UUP	Edmund Mills	8.08%	555	686.95	800.25	804.09	832.96	845.8	848.96	1,279.96
Alliance	James Hamilton	10.26%	705	727.05	731.1	731.48	740.58	926.39	1,052	1,166.93
Loyalist	Thomas Barkley	6.46%	444	452.4	460.45	460.63	740.92	744.97	744.97	837.39
UUP	Robert McCready	7.19%	494	615.1	693.05	698.13	729.98	741.12	743.49	
Alliance	Anne Mayne	5.43%	373	377.9	385.35	385.49	388.86			
Loyalist	Campbell McCormick	4.17%	344	365.7	372.45	372.69				
UUP	James Warden	2.02%	139	232.1						
Electorate: 9,818 Valid: 6,871 (69.99%) Spoilt: 64 Quota: 1,146 Turnout: 6,935 (70.64%)
