= North Down Area D =

District electoral areas in North Down, Northern Ireland

North Down Area D was one of the four district electoral areas in North Down, Northern Ireland which existed from 1973 to 1985. The district elected five members to North Down Borough Council, and formed part of the North Down constituencies for the Northern Ireland Assembly and UK Parliament.

It was created for the 1973 local elections, and contained the wards of Craigavad, Cultra, Holywood Demesne, Holywood Priory and Loughview. It was abolished for the 1985 local elections and replaced by the Holywood DEA.

== Councillors ==
Election	Councillor (Party)	Councillor (Party)	Councillor (Party)	Councillor (Party)	Councillor (Party)
1981	Gordon Dunne (DUP)	John Auld (UUP)	Ellie McKay (UUP)	Susan O'Brien (Alliance)	Michael Clarke (Alliance)
1977	Frederick White (UUUP)	John Auld (UUP)	Thomas Bussell (UUP)	Keith Jones (Alliance)	Kenneth Kennedy (Alliance)
1973	Ian Kerr (Loyalist)	John Auld (UUP)	Kathleen McClure (UUP)	Keith Jones (Alliance)	James Shannon (Alliance)

== 1981 Election ==
1977: 2 x UUP, 2 x Alliance, 1 x UUUP

1981: 2 x UUP, 2 x Alliance, 1 x DUP

1977-1981 Change: DUP gain from UUUP

North Down Area D - 5 seats
Party	Candidate	FPv%	Count								
Party	Candidate	FPv%	1	2	3	4	5	6	7	8	9
UUP	Ellie McKay	21.01%	1,076								
UUP	John Auld*	15.68%	803	887.84							
DUP	Gordon Dunne	9.94%	509	524.54	534.96	542.59	804.16	882.16			
Alliance	Susan O'Brien	14.20%	727	738.97	741.39	751.81	752.23	764.38	767.89	769.13	841.13
Alliance	Michael Clarke	8.26%	423	426.15	429.36	439.2	440.2	457.77	470.11	470.11	799.11
UPUP	Frederick White*	7.30%	374	389.75	497.43	552.48	566.11	667.53	686.9	710.46	722.46
Alliance	Irene Cave	7.64%	391	396.46	398.46	418.3	419.3	449.29	455.66	458.76	
UUP	Thomas Bussell*	4.39%	225	288.42	293.68	358.2	369.3				
DUP	Edith Cole	5.41%	277	283.72	287.93	297.35					
Unionist Party NI	Trevor Boyd	3.53%	181	187.51	191.93						
UPUP	Eric Griffith	2.64%	135	139.83							
Electorate: 9,205 Valid: 5,121 (55.63%) Spoilt: 125 Quota: 854 Turnout: 5,246 (56.99%)

== 1977 Election ==
1973: 2 x UUP, 2 x Alliance, 1 x Loyalist

1977: 2 x UUP, 2 x Alliance, 1 x UUUP

1973-1977 Change: UUUP gain from Loyalist

North Down Area D - 5 seats
Party	Candidate	FPv%	Count					
Party	Candidate	FPv%	1	2	3	4	5	6
UUP	John Auld*	24.57%	1,042					
Alliance	Keith Jones*	21.72%	921					
Alliance	Kenneth Kennedy	12.24%	519	557.4	706.67	769.67		
UUP	Thomas Bussell	5.99%	254	456.24	458.08	724.08		
UUUP	Frederick White	13.98%	593	615.08	615.54	662.25	669.25	678.71
Alliance	Susan O'Brien	12.07%	512	524.16	577.06	613.34	654.34	661.82
Unionist Party NI	Robert Todd	5.02%	213	227.4	230.16			
UUP	Henry Clouston	4.41%	187	226.04	227.65			
Electorate: 9,242 Valid: 4,241 (45.89%) Spoilt: 157 Quota: 707 Turnout: 4,398 (47.59%)

== 1973 Election ==
1973: 2 x UUP, 2 x Alliance, 1 x Loyalist

North Down Area D - 5 seats
Party	Candidate	FPv%	Count									
Party	Candidate	FPv%	1	2	3	4	5	6	7	8	9	10
UUP	John Auld	14.89%	948	959	967	1,022	1,152					
Alliance	Keith Jones	16.09%	1,024	1,030	1,031	1,033	1,046	1,261				
Alliance	James Shannon	14.49%	922	937	940	953	972	1,122				
UUP	Kathleen McClure	12.24%	779	785	792	866	942	951	995	1,049.76	1,066.76	
Loyalist	Ian Kerr	7.24%	461	467	652	659	671	677	683	690.4	692.9	894.54
Independent	Henry McCourt	8.48%	540	573	575	576	578	599	695	696.48	729.48	881.18
UUP	David McCormick	7.53%	479	482	491	549	586	599	627	653.64	661.14	
Alliance	John Marks	6.32%	402	405	406	411	416					
UUP	Maurice Davison	4.27%	272	272	275	294						
UUP	Richard Thompson	3.66%	233	233	235							
Loyalist	Arthur Millar	3.33%	212	222								
Independent	Francis McKeag	1.46%	93									
Electorate: 9,077 Valid: 6,365 (70.12%) Spoilt: 113 Quota: 1,061 Turnout: 6,478 (71.37%)
