= 1989 North Down Borough Council election =

Northern Ireland local election

← 1985	17 May 1989	1993 →

All 24 seats to North Down Borough Council 13 seats needed for a majority
	First party	Second party	Third party
Party	NI Conservatives	UUP	Alliance
Seats won	6	5	4
Seat change	▲6	▼3	▼3
	Fourth party	Fifth party	Sixth party
Party	DUP	UPUP	Independent
Seats won	4	2	2
Seat change	▼2	0	▲2
	Seventh party
Party	Ind. Unionist
Seats won	1
Seat change	0

Elections to North Down Borough Council were held on 17 May 1989 , coinciding with other local government elections in Northern Irish local government elections. The election used four district electoral areas to elect a total of 24 councillors.

Prior to the election three Ulster Unionist politicians, including George Green, defected to the Conservative Party in Northern Ireland. The election resulted in the Conservative presence in North Down doubling, making them the largest party on the council.

== Election results ==
North Down Borough Council Election Result 1989
Party	Seats	Gains	Losses	Net gain/loss	Seats %	Votes %	Votes	+/−
NI Conservatives	6	6	0	▲6	25.0	24.9	5,204	New
UUP	5	0	3	▼3	20.8	21.7	4,548	▼10.6
Alliance	4	0	3	▼3	16.7	20.7	4,313	▼5.6
DUP	4	0	2	▼3	16.7	15.5	3,234	▼7.8
Independent	2	2	0	▲2	8.3	6.9	1,443	▲4.2
UPUP	2	1	1	0	8.3	5.9	1,223	▼3.8
Ind. Unionist	1	0	0	0	4.2	2.8	578	▼1.2
PUP	0	0	0	0	0.0	1.6	325	▼0.1

Note: "Votes" are the first preference votes.

== Districts summary ==
Results of the North Down Borough Council election, 1989 by district
Ward	%	Cllrs	%	Cllrs	%	Cllrs	%	Cllrs	%	Cllrs	%	Cllrs	Total Cllrs
Ward	Conservative		UUP		Alliance		DUP		UPUP		Others		Total Cllrs
Abbey	19.2	1	12.4	1	12.9	1	25.6	1	29.9	2	0.0	0	6
Ballyholme and Groomsport	27.5	2	25.4	1	24.1	1	12.4	1	0.0	0	10.6	1	6
Bangor West	26.7	2	23.0	2	19.3	1	14.5	1	0.0	0	16.5	1	7
Holywood	24.6	1	24.1	1	25.2	1	11.7	1	0.0	0	14.4	1	5
Total	24.9	6	21.7	5	20.7	4	15.5	4	5.9	2	11.3	3	24

== Districts results ==
=== Abbey ===
1985: 2 x DUP, 2 x UUP, 1 x Alliance, 1 x UPUP
1989: 2 x UPUP, 1 x DUP, 1 x Conservative, 1 x Alliance, 1 x UUP
1985-1989 Change: UPUP and Conservative gain from DUP and UUP

Abbey - 6 seats
Party	Candidate	FPv%	Count						
Party	Candidate	FPv%	1	2	3	4	5	6	7
UPUP	Valerie Kinghan	18.19%	745						
NI Conservatives	George Green*	13.09%	536	546.12	551.66	558.66	752.66		
UPUP	Cecil Braniff*	11.67%	478	560.50	580.36	584.80	587.46		
Alliance	James Magee*	7.30%	299	305.82	308.92	513.80	541.46	605.46	
DUP	Denny Vitty	10.47%	429	438.68	445.34	445.56	448.78	454.78	609.78
UUP	Irene Cree	8.52%	349	364.40	483.26	483.26	498.92	546.92	571.9
DUP	Ivy Cooling*	7.89%	323	332.24	337.12	337.12	338.34	349.34	462.10
NI Conservatives	Shirley McCann	6.10%	250	252.86	254.30	262.30			
Alliance	Mariam Judge	5.57%	228	229.76	229.98				
UUP	Edward Johnston	2.91%	119	128.02					
UUP	Robert Todd	1.03%	42	45.30					
Electorate: 11,789 Valid: 4,096 (34.74%) Spoilt: 188 Quota: 586 Turnout: 4,284 (36.34%)

=== Ballyholme and Groomsport ===
1985: 2 x UUP, 2 x Alliance, 1 x DUP, 1 x Independent Unionist
1989: 2 x Conservative, 1 x UUP, 1 x Alliance, 1 x DUP, 1 x Independent Unionist
1985-1989 Change: Conservatives (two seats) gain from UUP and Alliance

Ballyholme and Groomsport - 6 seats
Party	Candidate	FPv%	Count									
Party	Candidate	FPv%	1	2	3	4	5	6	7	8	9	10
UUP	Leslie Cree	15.81%	864									
NI Conservatives	Bruce Mulligan*	11.18%	611	612.35	614.35	621.98	623.25	814.25				
Alliance	Jane Copeland*	13.01%	711	712.53	762.53	768.89	771.16	779.25	779.59	1,159.59		
NI Conservatives	Ivan Thompson	10.49%	573	574.53	582.53	586.89	587.16	672.43	703.71	765.07	877.07	
Ind. Unionist	Edmund Mills*	10.58%	578	580.25	584.25	589.88	593.06	602.42	602.76	630.85	684.85	713.85
DUP	Alan Leslie*	7.85%	429	432.6	434.6	452.31	686.82	693.09	693.26	697.89	703.89	705.89
UUP	Samuel Mellon	6.52%	356	375.35	378.35	518.2	532.28	547.09	547.09	575.54	608.54	635.54
Alliance	Donald Hayes*	8.86%	484	485.44	533.44	535.71	535.89	542.89	543.06			
NI Conservatives	William McLean	5.84%	319	320.44	322.53	326.25	329.34					
DUP	Robert Gordon	4.58%	250	255.22	255.31	269.21						
UUP	Ian Henry	3.04%	166	204.79	207.79							
Alliance	William Johnston	2.25%	123	123.18								
Electorate: 14,179 Valid: 5,464 (38.54%) Spoilt: 150 Quota: 781 Turnout: 5,614 (39.59%)

=== Bangor West ===
1985: 2 x UUP, 2 x Alliance, 2 x DUP, 1 x UPUP
1989: 2 x Conservative, 2 x UUP, 1 x Alliance, 1 x DUP, 1 x Independent
1985-1989 Change: Conservatives (two seats) and Independent gain from Alliance, DUP and UPUP

Bangor West - 7 seats
Party	Candidate	FPv%	Count									
Party	Candidate	FPv%	1	2	3	4	5	6	7	8	9	10
UUP	Hazel Bradford*	10.73%	698	707	710	716	748	880				
DUP	William Baxter	7.10%	462	497	498	502	551	573	575.5	829.5		
Alliance	Brian Wilson*	10.71%	697	699	763	779	789	802	808	817		
Independent	Ann-Marie Hillen	8.25%	537	540	549	701	725	741	742.5	764.5	902.5	
NI Conservatives	Thomas Miskelly	9.62%	626	629	632	643	664	694	695.5	703.5	763.5	794.5
NI Conservatives	James O'Fee	8.81%	573	579	580	587	597	623	624.5	641.5	717	744
UUP	Roy Bradford	6.19%	403	408	409	411	443	534	581	650	693	706
NI Conservatives	Jack Preston	8.25%	537	550	551	556	577	605	605	613	662	673
Alliance	William Bailie*	6.36%	414	416	471	473	476	491	491.5	493.5		
DUP	Alan Graham*	5.34%	347	398	402	404	429	453	457.5			
UUP	Terence McKeag	6.09%	396	397	398	399	425					
PUP	Thomas O'Brien	4.86%	316	327	328	329						
Independent	Colin Simpson	3.24%	211	212	212							
Alliance	Eileen Bell	2.23%	145	145								
DUP	Elizabeth McMurtry	2.08%	135									
PUP	Samuel Meneely	0.14%	9									
Electorate: 15,249 Valid: 6,506 (42.67%) Spoilt: 147 Quota: 814 Turnout: 6,653 (43.63%)

=== Holywood ===
1985: 2 x UUP, 2 x Alliance, 1 x DUP
1989: 1 x Alliance, 1 x Conservative, 1 x UUP, 1 x DUP, 1 x Independent
1985-1989 Change: Conservative and Independent gain from UUP and Alliance

Holywood - 5 seats
Party	Candidate	FPv%	Count					
Party	Candidate	FPv%	1	2	3	4	5	6
NI Conservatives	Laurence Kennedy	16.14%	775	852				
UUP	Ellie McKay*	12.27%	589	641	694	704.12	1,035.12	
Independent	Dennis Ogborn	14.47%	695	712	755	764.2	804.2	
DUP	Gordon Dunne*	11.68%	561	564	576	578.76	659.28	805.28
Alliance	Susan O'Brien*	13.74%	660	670	696	701.52	732.96	754.96
Alliance	Paul De Haan	11.50%	552	559	585	592.36	626.12	659.12
UUP	John Auld*	9.85%	473	498	549	564.64		
NI Conservatives	Alice Kennedy	5.60%	269	299				
NI Conservatives	Michael Weir	2.81%	135					
UUP	Ian Sinclair*	1.94%	93					
Electorate: 10,290 Valid: 4,802 (46.67%) Spoilt: 116 Quota: 801 Turnout: 4,918 (47.79%)
