= 1973 North Down Borough Council election =

Northern Ireland local election

30 May 1973	1977 →

All 20 seats to North Down Borough Council 11 seats needed for a majority
	First party	Second party	Third party
Party	UUP	Alliance	Loyalist
Seats won	9	7	4

Elections to North Down Borough Council were held on 30 May 1973 on the same day as the other Northern Irish local government elections. The election used four district electoral areas to elect a total of 20 councillors.

The elections were the first following the reorganisation of local government in Northern Ireland, brought about by the Local Government (Boundaries) Act (Northern Ireland) 1971 & Local Government Act (Northern Ireland) 1972, which replaced the previous FPTP ward system with a new system of proportional representation using multi-member district electoral areas.

== Election results ==
Party	Seats	±	First Pref. votes	FPv%	±%
UUP	9		11,977	46.0	
Alliance	7		7,691	29.5	
Loyalist	4		4,638	17.8	
Independent	0		1,282	4.9	
Ind. Unionist	0		315	1.2	
NI Labour	0		148	0.6	
Totals	20		26,393	100.0	—

== Districts summary ==
Results of the North Down Borough Council election, 1973 by district
Ward	%	Cllrs	%	Cllrs	%	Cllrs	Total Cllrs
Ward	UUP		Alliance		Others		Total Cllrs
Area A	57.5	3	31.0	2	11.5	0	5
Area B	44.5	2	21.5	1	34.0	2	5
Area C	38.2	2	28.8	2	33.0	1	5
Area D	42.6	2	36.9	2	20.5	1	5
Total	46.0	9	29.5	7	24.5	4	20

== Districts results ==
=== Area A ===
1973: 3 x UUP, 2 x Alliance

North Down Area A - 5 seats
Party	Candidate	FPv%	Count							
Party	Candidate	FPv%	1	2	3	4	5	6	7	8
UUP	Robert Topping	25.99%	1,786							
UUP	Maurice Butler	14.20%	976	1,180.8						
Alliance	Bertie McConnell	15.35%	1,055	1,090.35	1,102.55	1,103.99	1,109.49	1,248.49		
UUP	Edmund Mills	8.08%	555	686.95	800.25	804.09	832.96	845.8	848.96	1,279.96
Alliance	James Hamilton	10.26%	705	727.05	731.1	731.48	740.58	926.39	1,052	1,166.93
Loyalist	Thomas Barkley	6.46%	444	452.4	460.45	460.63	740.92	744.97	744.97	837.39
UUP	Robert McCready	7.19%	494	615.1	693.05	698.13	729.98	741.12	743.49	
Alliance	Anne Mayne	5.43%	373	377.9	385.35	385.49	388.86			
Loyalist	Campbell McCormick	4.17%	344	365.7	372.45	372.69				
UUP	James Warden	2.02%	139	232.1						
Electorate: 9,818 Valid: 6,871 (69.99%) Spoilt: 64 Quota: 1,146 Turnout: 6,935 (70.64%)

=== Area B ===
1973: 2 x UUP, 2 x Loyalist, 1 x Alliance

North Down Area B - 5 seats
Party	Candidate	FPv%	Count								
Party	Candidate	FPv%	1	2	3	4	5	6	7	8	9
UUP	John Preston	19.24%	1,276								
Loyalist	George Green	14.09%	934	962	969.02	973.28	990.49	1,316.49			
Alliance	James Magee	8.16%	541	543	546.64	783.68	804.02	821.41	824.76	1,415.76	
UUP	Amy Corry	10.83%	718	722	760.22	765.48	892.35	930.38	941.77	956.42	1,121.22
Loyalist	Thomas Braniff	10.33%	685	754	757.9	762.03	771.55	898.37	1,080.61	1,090.06	1,114.86
UUP	Arminella McMullan	8.34%	553	553	586.28	591.93	869.78	907.77	919.16	929.81	1,047.41
Alliance	Clifford Creighton	8.20%	544	544	545.69	624.21	629.47	635.99	636.66		
Loyalist	Bruce Mulligan	7.51%	498	526	532.89	535.89	561.92				
UUP	Mary Norman	6.09%	404	407	474.21	483.47					
Alliance	Denis Mayne	5.16%	342	344	347.12						
Loyalist	Thomas O'Brien	2.05%	136								
Electorate: 10,509 Valid: 6,631 (63.10%) Spoilt: 112 Quota: 1,106 Turnout: 6,743 (64.16%)

=== Area C ===
1973: 2 x Alliance, 2 x UUP, 1 x Loyalist

North Down Area C - 5 seats
Party	Candidate	FPv%	Count							
Party	Candidate	FPv%	1	2	3	4	5	6	7	8
UUP	Robert Campbell	21.86%	1,352							
UUP	David Belshaw	11.95%	739	853.17	864.23	868.69	879.92	887.84	1,040.65	
Alliance	John Calvert	12.76%	789	797.05	808.05	844.05	844.05	975.43	988.58	1,080.58
Loyalist	Mary O'Fee	10.32%	638	655.94	672.4	677.63	941.7	943.93	966.46	1,071.46
Alliance	Jean Foster	11.06%	684	695.73	726.73	793.96	799.42	974.88	989.41	1,044.82
Independent	James Stark	8.18%	506	522.56	546.79	573.79	577.02	588.71	614.7	735.76
Ind. Unionist	Henry Garner	5.09%	315	376.64	380.87	383.87	390.56	397.56	534.55	
UUP	Henry Patton	4.43%	274	342.08	347.77	347.77	351.23	356.46		
Alliance	Thomas Rollins	5.01%	310	313.91	328.91	341.91	341.91			
Loyalist	Christopher Millar	4.62%	286	290.14	294.14	296.14				
NI Labour	Harold Parkhill	2.39%	148	148.92	170.92					
Independent	Brian Wilson	2.31%	143	145.3						
Electorate: 9,067 Valid: 6,184 (68.20%) Spoilt: 53 Quota: 1,031 Turnout: 6,237 (68.79%)

=== Area D ===
1973: 2 x UUP, 2 x Alliance, 1 x Loyalist

North Down Area D - 5 seats
Party	Candidate	FPv%	Count									
Party	Candidate	FPv%	1	2	3	4	5	6	7	8	9	10
UUP	John Auld	14.89%	948	959	967	1,022	1,152					
Alliance	Keith Jones	16.09%	1,024	1,030	1,031	1,033	1,046	1,261				
Alliance	James Shannon	14.49%	922	937	940	953	972	1,122				
UUP	Kathleen McClure	12.24%	779	785	792	866	942	951	995	1,049.76	1,066.76	
Loyalist	Ian Kerr	7.24%	461	467	652	659	671	677	683	690.4	692.9	894.54
Independent	Henry McCourt	8.48%	540	573	575	576	578	599	695	696.48	729.48	881.18
UUP	David McCormick	7.53%	479	482	491	549	586	599	627	653.64	661.14	
Alliance	John Marks	6.32%	402	405	406	411	416					
UUP	Maurice Davison	4.27%	272	272	275	294						
UUP	Richard Thompson	3.66%	233	233	235							
Loyalist	Arthur Millar	3.33%	212	222								
Independent	Francis McKeag	1.46%	93									
Electorate: 9,077 Valid: 6,365 (70.12%) Spoilt: 113 Quota: 1,061 Turnout: 6,478 (71.37%)
