= 2011 North Down Borough Council election =

Local government election in Northern Ireland

- 5 May 2011

All 25 seats to North Down Borough Council 13 seats needed for a majority
	First party	Second party	Third party
Party	DUP	Alliance	UUP
Seats won	11	6	4
Seat change	▲3	0	▼4
	Fourth party	Fifth party
Party	Independent	Green (NI)
Seats won	3	1
Seat change	▲1	0
- Party with the most votes by district.

Elections to North Down Borough Council were held on 5 May 2011 on the same day as the other Northern Irish local government elections. The election used four district electoral areas to elect a total of 25 councillors.

== Election results ==
North Down Borough Council Election Result 2011
Party	Seats	Gains	Losses	Net gain/loss	Seats %	Votes %	Votes	+/−
DUP	11	3	0	▲3	44.0	36.2	9,031	▲4.8
Alliance	6	0	0	0	24.0	18.3	4,561	▲2.3
UUP	4	0	4	▼4	16.0	13.9	3,472	▼7.6
Independent	3	1	0	▲1	12.0	18.4	4,583	▲7.3
Green (NI)	1	1	1	0	4.0	7.4	1,834	▲1.0
NI Conservatives	0	0	0	0	0.0	2.9	727	▲1.6
UKIP	0	0	0	0	0.0	1.7	427	New
SDLP	0	0	0	0	0.0	1.2	298	▼0.7

Note: "Votes" are the first preference votes.

== Districts summary ==
Results of the North Down Borough Council election, 2011 by district
Ward	%	Cllrs	%	Cllrs	%	Cllrs	%	Cllrs	%	Cllrs	Total Cllrs
Ward	DUP		Alliance		UUP		Green		Others		Total Cllrs
Abbey	48.0	4	14.7	1	9.7	0	11.5	1	16.1	0	6
Ballyholme and Groomsport	37.8	3	13.7	1	12.8	1	4.7	0	31.0	2	7
Bangor West	28.9	2	17.9	2	14.0	2	4.3	0	34.9	1	7
Holywood	30.6	2	31.9	2	21.2	1	12.0	0	4.3	0	5
Total	36.2	8	18.3	6	13.9	4	7.4	1	24.2	3	25

== Districts results ==
=== Abbey ===
2005: 3 x DUP, 2 x UUP, 1 x Alliance
2011: 4 x DUP, 1 x Alliance, 1 x Green
2005-2011 Change: DUP and Green gain from UUP (two seats)

Abbey - 6 seats
Party	Candidate	FPv%	Count												
Party	Candidate	FPv%	1	2	3	4	5	6	7	8	9	10	11	12	13
DUP	Ivy Cooling*	16.01%	859												
Alliance	Michael Bower	14.74%	791												
DUP	Wesley Irvine*	12.99%	697	702.3	703.14	703.2	706.23	709.23	712.23	717.23	732.29	742.45	759.68	828.68	
Green (NI)	Steven Agnew	11.51%	618	619	629.56	633.62	641.68	651.95	656.95	663.17	682.38	698.57	711.88	776.88	
DUP	Harry Dunlop*	9.99%	536	606.3	607.92	607.92	609.92	614.01	618.01	620.11	630.24	647.3	662.53	731.75	753.75
DUP	William Montgomery*	9.04%	485	489.2	489.92	492.92	492.92	497.95	503.95	508.95	521.95	534.01	546.11	592.43	610.43
UUP	Heather Bingham-Steele	5.65%	303	303.9	305.07	305.1	307.2	312.23	313.23	318.26	332.44	348.6	518.53	549.89	554.89
Community Partnership	Mark Gordon	6.80%	365	365.8	366.7	368.7	372.73	376.76	379.76	423.03	432.12	444.21	455.33		
UUP	Aaron Jamison	4.06%	218	219.1	220.09	220.09	223.09	225.12	228.12	230.15	255.24	275.3			
UKIP	William Ferguson	1.90%	102	102.2	102.83	102.83	104.89	107.92	148.95	150.05	164.11				
NI Conservatives	Dean Russell	2.35%	126	126.1	126.97	127	127.1	129.16	133.16	136.16					
Community Partnership	Karen Worrall	1.42%	76	76.3	76.78	77.78	78.78	84.78	86.81						
UKIP	Stuart Tanner	1.36%	73	73	73.06	73.06	74.06	77.09							
Independent	Ed Simpson	1.36%	44	44	44.72	61.05	70.11								
Independent	Christopher Carter	0.73%	39	39.3	39.72	42.72									
Independent	Robert Mooney	0.65%	35	35	35.57										
Electorate: 13,358 Valid: 5,367 (40.18%) Spoilt: 128 Quota: 767 Turnout: 5,495 (41.14%)

=== Ballyholme and Groomsport ===
2005: 2 x DUP, 2 x UUP, 2 x Independent, 1 x Alliance
2011: 3 x DUP, 2 x Independent, 1 x Alliance, 1 x UUP
2005-2011 Change: DUP gain from UUP

Ballyholme and Groomsport - 7 seats
Party	Candidate	FPv%	Count										
Party	Candidate	FPv%	1	2	3	4	5	6	7	8	9	10	11
DUP	Alex Easton*	22.06%	1,812										
Independent	Alan Chambers*	18.03%	1,481										
DUP	Peter Weir*	9.28%	762	1,048.88									
DUP	Peter Martin	6.44%	529	903.88	980.72	997.16	1,019.52	1,053.52					
UUP	Ian Henry*	5.04%	414	434.68	479.56	484.32	547.32	586.58	659.86	684	687	1,100	
Alliance	Christine Bower	7.38%	606	615.68	648.32	654.32	662.88	690.7	731.16	854.1	856.1	897.26	911.26
Independent	Austen Lennon*	6.12%	503	532.48	615.44	619.44	627.78	660.02	740.06	812.14	816.14	844.18	854.18
Alliance	Adam Harbinson	6.37%	523	533.12	570.52	575.52	586.98	617.8	651.34	764.28	767.28	794.66	801.66
UUP	Colin Breen	5.64%	463	478.84	514.2	524.88	572.26	597.82	624.78	654.14	657.14		
Green (NI)	Paul Roberts	4.75%	390	392.2	408.86	418.56	422.44	449.78	472.82				
Independent	Roberta Dunlop*	2.71%	223	233.56	307.34	319.22	324.9	351.06					
NI Conservatives	David Symington	2.86%	235	241.16	258.16	272.6	284.94						
UUP	Francis McCully	2.11%	173	180.04	198.4	205.08							
UKIP	Pat Toms	1.23%	101	107.6	113.38								
Electorate: 17,062 Valid: 8,215 (48.15%) Spoilt: 107 Quota: 1,027 Turnout: 8,322 (48.78%)

=== Bangor West ===
2005: 2 x DUP, 2 x UUP, 2 x Alliance, 1 x Green
2011: 2 x DUP, 2 x UUP, 2 x Alliance, 1 x Independent
2005-2011 Change: Green becomes Independent

Bangor West - 7 seats
Party	Candidate	FPv%	Count										
Party	Candidate	FPv%	1	2	3	4	5	6	7	8	9	10	11
Independent	Brian Wilson*	20.86%	1,458										
DUP	Alan Graham*	15.55%	1,087										
DUP	Alan Leslie*	13.32%	931										
Alliance	Anne Wilson*	11.56%	808	1,107.28									
UUP	Marion Smith*	9.84%	688	772.28	837.8	908.36							
Alliance	Tony Hill*	6.31%	441	493.89	590.22	602.54	606.14	607.66	608.66	622.82	658.67	824.12	863.6
UUP	James McKerrow*	4.12%	288	312.08	321.05	402.53	428.93	453.63	457.93	509.31	586.4	593.12	645.89
Green (NI)	Joanne Dunlop	4.31%	301	351.74	384.5	394.02	398.22	400.5	403.6	424.48	449.1	541.19	575.81
Community Partnership	Alison Blayney	2.75%	192	199.31	202.82	206.46	210.66	211.04	329.41	349.47	356.96	366.21	
SDLP	Liam Logan	4.26%	298	325.09	337.18	339.98	341.28	341.66	342.76	347.61	355.9		
NI Conservatives	Julian Robertson	2.59%	181	196.91	201.59	210.27	213.27	215.74	216.74	239.31			
UKIP	Ade Benson	2.16%	151	164.76	167.1	184.74	190.24	191.19	195.29				
Community Partnership	Jamie Bryson	2.39%	167	168.72	170.28	171.96	176.36	176.74					
Electorate: 14,952 Valid: 6,991 (46.76%) Spoilt: 160 Quota: 874 Turnout: 7,151 (47.83%)

=== Holywood ===
2005: 2 x UUP, 2 x Alliance, 1 x DUP
2011: 2 x Alliance, 2 x DUP, 1 x UUP
2005-2011 Change: DUP gain from UUP

Holywood - 5 seats
Party	Candidate	FPv%	Count					
Party	Candidate	FPv%	1	2	3	4	5	6
DUP	Gordon Dunne*	24.79%	1,081					
Alliance	Andrew Muir	22.73%	991					
UUP	Ellie McKay*	15.48%	675	739.94				
Alliance	Laurence Thompson	9.20%	401	414.26	645.65	810.65		
DUP	Jennifer Gilmour	5.78%	252	449.52	503.03	627.22	658.54	668.66
Green (NI)	John Barry	12.04%	525	533.5	550.78	611.2	663.4	665.6
UUP	Gillian McGimpsey	5.73%	250	262.92	268.05			
NI Conservatives	David O'Callaghan	4.24%	185	189.76	192.73			
Electorate: 9,433 Valid: 4,360 (46.22%) Spoilt: 76 Quota: 727 Turnout: 4,436 (47.03%)
