= North Down Area B =

District electoral areas in North Down, Northern Ireland

North Down Area B was one of the four district electoral areas in North Down, Northern Ireland which existed from 1973 to 1985. The district elected five members to North Down Borough Council, and formed part of the North Down constituencies for the Northern Ireland Assembly and UK Parliament.

It was created for the 1973 local elections, and contained the wards of Conlig, Clandeboye, Rathgael, Silverstream and Whitehill. It was abolished for the 1985 local elections and replaced by the Abbey DEA and the Bangor West DEA.

== Councillors ==
Election	Councillor (Party)	Councillor (Party)	Councillor (Party)	Councillor (Party)	Councillor (Party)
1981	Wesley Graham (DUP)	John McCormick (DUP)	Cecil Braniff (UPUP)	George Green (UPUP)/ (Vanguard)/ (Loyalist)	James Magee (Alliance)
1977	James Boyle (DUP)	Bruce Mulligan (UUP)	John Shields (UUP)	George Green (UPUP)/ (Vanguard)/ (Loyalist)	James Magee (Alliance)
1973	Thomas Braniff (Independent Unionist)	John Preston (UUP)	Amy Corry (UUP)	George Green (UPUP)/ (Vanguard)/ (Loyalist)	James Magee (Alliance)

== 1981 Election ==
1977: 2 x UUP, 1 x DUP, 1 x Alliance, 1 x Vanguard

1981: 2 x DUP, 2 x UPUP, 1 x Alliance

1977-1981 Change: UPUP (two seats) and DUP gain from UUP (two seats) and Vanguard

North Down Area B - 5 seats
Party	Candidate	FPv%	Count											
Party	Candidate	FPv%	1	2	3	4	5	6	7	8	9	10	11	12
UPUP	George Green*	17.95%	1,200											
DUP	Wesley Graham	14.54%	972	975	978.99	986.41	1,005.11	1,026.18	1,029.18	1,052.6	1,082.74	1,406.79		
DUP	John McCormick	12.28%	821	823	828.18	835.39	857.02	893.23	895.37	909.07	927.49	1,273.82		
Alliance	James Magee*	10.96%	733	733	737.76	739.32	761.51	766.51	1,006.58	1,031.91	1,060.17	1,064.31	1,075.31	1,090.78
UPUP	Cecil Braniff	4.58%	306	313	324.03	473.79	488.93	561.54	566.68	749.1	782.57	805.92	891.92	980.19
UUP	Chalmers Quee	5.77%	386	387	393.72	397.42	443.26	455.47	463.89	495.15	771.25	792.67	851.67	906.27
DUP	George McMurtry	9.91%	663	667	669.8	674.35	693.71	719.78	721.92	734.34	746.69			
UUP	Phyllis Brown	5.53%	370	373	376.92	388.69	417.25	429.39	441.46	454.65				
UPUP	William Elliott	3.50%	234	236	251.19	273.93	305.42	319.63	325.63					
Alliance	Anne Wilson	4.01%	268	268	268.7	269.84	286.26	288.26						
PUP	Thomas O'Brien	4.04%	270	272	273.4	276.54	285.75							
Ind. Unionist	John Shields*	3.48%	233	235	241.44	246.28								
UPUP	James Boyle*	3.04%	203	205	224.39									
Ind. Unionist	William Johnston	0.42%	28											
Electorate: 14,099 Valid: 6,687 (47.43%) Spoilt: 201 Quota: 1,115 Turnout: 6,888 (48.85%)

== 1977 Election ==
1973: 2 x UUP, 2 x Loyalist, 1 x Alliance

1977: 2 x UUP, 1 x Alliance, 1 x Vanguard, 1 x DUP

1973-1977 Change: Vanguard and DUP gain from Loyalist (two seats)

North Down Area B - 5 seats
Party	Candidate	FPv%	Count				
Party	Candidate	FPv%	1	2	3	4	5
Vanguard	George Green*	18.00%	823				
Alliance	James Magee*	17.08%	781				
UUP	Bruce Mulligan	10.89%	498	539	554.92	555.6	864.6
DUP	James Boyle	4.58%	598	713	721.96	722.28	748.76
UUP	John Shields	12.05%	551	594	610.16	610.78	742.68
Alliance	John Hoy	10.69%	489	522	526.88	539.56	570.22
UUP	Amy Corry*	10.61%	485	514	526.72	527.32	
Ind. Unionist	William Ash	4.02%	184				
Ind. Unionist	William Alexander	3.59%	164				
Electorate: 12,454 Valid: 4,573 (36.73%) Spoilt: 172 Quota: 763 Turnout: 4,745 (38.10%)

== 1973 Election ==
1973: 2 x UUP, 2 x Loyalist, 1 x Alliance

North Down Area B - 5 seats
Party	Candidate	FPv%	Count								
Party	Candidate	FPv%	1	2	3	4	5	6	7	8	9
UUP	John Preston	19.24%	1,276								
Loyalist	George Green	14.09%	934	962	969.02	973.28	990.49	1,316.49			
Alliance	James Magee	8.16%	541	543	546.64	783.68	804.02	821.41	824.76	1,415.76	
UUP	Amy Corry	10.83%	718	722	760.22	765.48	892.35	930.38	941.77	956.42	1,121.22
Loyalist	Thomas Braniff	10.33%	685	754	757.9	762.03	771.55	898.37	1,080.61	1,090.06	1,114.86
UUP	Arminella McMullan	8.34%	553	553	586.28	591.93	869.78	907.77	919.16	929.81	1,047.41
Alliance	Clifford Creighton	8.20%	544	544	545.69	624.21	629.47	635.99	636.66		
Loyalist	Bruce Mulligan	7.51%	498	526	532.89	535.89	561.92				
UUP	Mary Norman	6.09%	404	407	474.21	483.47					
Alliance	Denis Mayne	5.16%	342	344	347.12						
Loyalist	Thomas O'Brien	2.05%	136								
Electorate: 10,509 Valid: 6,631 (63.10%) Spoilt: 112 Quota: 1,106 Turnout: 6,743 (64.16%)
