= 1977 North Down Borough Council election =

Northern Ireland local election

← 1973	18 May 1977	1981 →

All 20 seats to North Down Borough Council 11 seats needed for a majority
	First party	Second party	Third party
Party	Alliance	UUP	Vanguard
Seats won	7	7	2
Seat change	0	▼2	▲2
	Fourth party	Fifth party	Sixth party
Party	Unionist Party NI	DUP	UUUP
Seats won	1	1	1
Seat change	▲1	▲1	▲1
	Seventh party	Eighth party
Party	Ind. Unionist	Loyalist
Seats won	1	0
Seat change	▲1	▼4

Elections to North Down Borough Council were held on 18 May 1977 on the same day as the other Northern Irish local government elections. The election used four district electoral areas to elect a total of 20 councillors.

== Election results ==
North Down Borough Council Election Result 1977
Party	Seats	Gains	Losses	Net gain/loss	Seats %	Votes %	Votes	+/−
Alliance	7	0	0	0	35.0	38.5	7,364	▲9.0
UUP	7	0	2	▼2	35.0	27.3	5,220	▼18.7
Vanguard	2	2	0	▲2	10.0	7.2	1,373	New
Unionist Party NI	1	1	0	▲1	5.0	9.2	1,761	New
DUP	1	1	0	▲1	5.0	8.3	1,625	New
UUUP	1	1	0	▲1	5.0	3.1	593	New
Ind. Unionist	1	1	0	0	5.0	6.0	1,184	▲4.8

Note: "Votes" are the first preference votes.

== Districts summary ==
Results of the North Down Borough Council election, 1977 by district
Ward	%	Cllrs	%	Cllrs	%	Cllrs	%	Cllrs	%	Cllrs	%	Cllrs	%	Cllrs	Total Cllrs
Ward	Alliance		UUP		Vanguard		UPNI		DUP		UUUP		Others		Total Cllrs
Area A	37.2	2	17.1	1	0.0	0	20.3	1	10.8	0	0.0	0	14.6	1	5
Area B	27.8	1	33.5	2	18.0	1	0.0	0	13.1	1	0.0	0	7.6	0	5
Area C	44.0	2	26.8	2	12.2	1	8.2	0	8.9	0	0.0	0	0.0	0	5
Area D	46.0	2	35.0	2	0.0	0	5.0	0	0.0	0	14.0	1	0.0	0	5
Total	38.5	7	27.3	7	7.2	2	9.2	1	8.3	1	3.1	1	6.4	1	20

== Districts results ==
=== Area A ===
1973: 3 x UUP, 2 x Alliance
1977: 2 x Alliance, 1 x UUP, 1 x UPNI, 1 x Independent Unionist
1973-1977 Change: UPNI and Independent Unionist gain from UUP (two seats)

North Down Area A - 5 seats
Party	Candidate	FPv%	Count					
Party	Candidate	FPv%	1	2	3	4	5	6
Alliance	Bertie McConnell*	23.71%	1,372					
Unionist Party NI	William Bailie	20.38%	1,179					
Ind. Unionist	Edmund Mills*	14.45%	836	863	943.37	980.37		
Alliance	James Hamilton*	7.17%	415	667.9	703.81	711.78	729.06	1,074.06
UUP	Thomas Barkley	8.14%	471	478.8	516.23	595.41	933.1	941.1
DUP	Sammy Wilson	10.82%	626	628.7	636.11	645.11	663.53	666.53
Alliance	Clifford Creighton	6.33%	366	472.2	492.53	494.21	502.35	
UUP	Hugh Irvine	4.84%	280	286.3	304.35	415.1		
UUP	Lillie Navan	4.17%	241	244.9	257.44			
Electorate: 11,231 Valid: 5,786 (51.52%) Spoilt: 121 Quota: 965 Turnout: 5,907 (52.60%)

=== Area B ===
1973: 2 x UUP, 2 x Loyalist, 1 x Alliance
1977: 2 x UUP, 1 x Alliance, 1 x Vanguard, 1 x DUP
1973-1977 Change: Vanguard and DUP gain from Loyalist (two seats)

North Down Area B - 5 seats
Party	Candidate	FPv%	Count				
Party	Candidate	FPv%	1	2	3	4	5
Vanguard	George Green*	18.00%	823				
Alliance	James Magee*	17.08%	781				
UUP	Bruce Mulligan	10.89%	498	539	554.92	555.6	864.6
DUP	James Boyle	4.58%	598	713	721.96	722.28	748.76
UUP	John Shields	12.05%	551	594	610.16	610.78	742.68
Alliance	John Hoy	10.69%	489	522	526.88	539.56	570.22
UUP	Amy Corry*	10.61%	485	514	526.72	527.32	
Ind. Unionist	William Ash	4.02%	184				
Ind. Unionist	William Alexander	3.59%	164				
Electorate: 12,454 Valid: 4,573 (36.73%) Spoilt: 172 Quota: 763 Turnout: 4,745 (38.10%)

=== Area C ===
1973: 2 x Alliance, 2 x UUP, 1 x Loyalist
1977: 2 x Alliance, 2 x UUP, 1 x Vanguard
1973-1977 Change: Loyalist joins Vanguard

North Down Area C - 5 seats
Party	Candidate	FPv%	Count						
Party	Candidate	FPv%	1	2	3	4	5	6	7
UUP	Hazel Bradford	14.05%	635	717	793				
Alliance	William Morrow	15.95%	721	725	791				
Vanguard	Mary O'Fee*	12.17%	550	565	624	630.6	797.6		
Alliance	Thomas Rollins	14.09%	637	643	701	707.6	710.6	711.04	732.16
UUP	Maisie McMullan	7.19%	325	439	496	519.1	662.1	703.9	709.02
Alliance	Jane Copeland	13.96%	631	635	674	676.2	680.2	681.52	691.76
DUP	Alan Graham	8.87%	401	413	423	423			
Unionist Party NI	Frank Gill	8.16%	369	376					
UUP	Archibald Pollock	5.55%	251						
Electorate: 9,940 Valid: 4,520 (45.47%) Spoilt: 77 Quota: 754 Turnout: 4,597 (46.25%)

=== Area D ===
1973: 2 x UUP, 2 x Alliance, 1 x Loyalist
1977: 2 x UUP, 2 x Alliance, 1 x UUUP
1973-1977 Change: UUUP gain from Loyalist

North Down Area D - 5 seats
Party	Candidate	FPv%	Count					
Party	Candidate	FPv%	1	2	3	4	5	6
UUP	John Auld*	24.57%	1,042					
Alliance	Keith Jones*	21.72%	921					
Alliance	Kenneth Kennedy	12.24%	519	557.4	706.67	769.67		
UUP	Thomas Bussell	5.99%	254	456.24	458.08	724.08		
UUUP	Frederick White	13.98%	593	615.08	615.54	662.25	669.25	678.71
Alliance	Susan O'Brien	12.07%	512	524.16	577.06	613.34	654.34	661.82
Unionist Party NI	Robert Todd	5.02%	213	227.4	230.16			
UUP	Henry Clouston	4.41%	187	226.04	227.65			
Electorate: 9,242 Valid: 4,241 (45.89%) Spoilt: 157 Quota: 707 Turnout: 4,398 (47.59%)
