= Abbey (District Electoral Area) =

District electoral areas in North Down, Northern Ireland

Abbey DEA (1993-2014) within North Down

Abbey was one of the four district electoral areas in North Down, Northern Ireland which existed from 1985 to 2014. The district elected six members to North Down Borough Council and formed part of the North Down constituencies for the Northern Ireland Assembly and UK Parliament.

It was created for the 1985 local elections, replacing North Down Area B and North Down Area C which had existed since 1973, and contained the wards of Bangor Castle, Bloomfield, Conlig, Harbour, Rathgael and Whitehill. It was abolished for the 2014 local elections and mainly replaced by the Bangor Central DEA.

== Councillors ==
Election	Councillor (party)	Councillor (party)	Councillor (party)	Councillor (party)	Councillor (party)	Councillor (party)
2011	Michael Bower (Alliance)	Steven Agnew (Green Party)	Harry Dunlop (DUP)/ (UUP)	Ivy Cooling (DUP)	William Montgomery (DUP)	Wesley Irvine (DUP)
2005	Stephen Farry (Alliance)	Roberta Dunlop (UUP)	Harry Dunlop (DUP)/ (UUP)	Ivy Cooling (DUP)	William Montgomery (DUP)	Wesley Irvine (DUP)
2001	Stephen Farry (Alliance)	Roberta Dunlop (UUP)	Irene Cree (UUP)	Ivy Cooling (DUP)	William Montgomery (DUP)	Valerie Kinghan (UKUP)/ (UPUP)
1997	Stephen Farry (Alliance)	Roberta Dunlop (UUP)	Ann Thompson (Conservative)	Ivy Cooling (DUP)	Stewart Currie (PUP)	Valerie Kinghan (UKUP)/ (UPUP)
1993	Stephen Farry (Alliance)	Irene Cree (UUP)	Ann Thompson (Conservative)	Ivy Cooling (DUP)	Cecil Braniff (UPUP)	Valerie Kinghan (UKUP)/ (UPUP)
1989	James Magee (Alliance)	Irene Cree (UUP)	George Green (Conservative)/ (UUP)	Denny Vitty (DUP)	Cecil Braniff (UPUP)	Valerie Kinghan (UKUP)/ (UPUP)
1985	James Magee (Alliance)	John Preston (UUP)	George Green (Conservative)/ (UUP)	Ivy Cooling (DUP)	Cecil Braniff (UPUP)	Brian Meharg (UPUP)

== 2011 election ==
2005: 3 x DUP, 2 x UUP, 1 x Alliance

2011: 4 x DUP, 1 x Alliance, 1 x Green

2005-2011 change: DUP and Green gain from UUP (two seats)

Abbey - 6 seats
Party	Candidate	FPv%	Count												
Party	Candidate	FPv%	1	2	3	4	5	6	7	8	9	10	11	12	13
DUP	Ivy Cooling*	16.01%	859												
Alliance	Michael Bower	14.74%	791												
DUP	Wesley Irvine*	12.99%	697	702.3	703.14	703.2	706.23	709.23	712.23	717.23	732.29	742.45	759.68	828.68	
Green (NI)	Steven Agnew	11.51%	618	619	629.56	633.62	641.68	651.95	656.95	663.17	682.38	698.57	711.88	776.88	
DUP	Harry Dunlop*	9.99%	536	606.3	607.92	607.92	609.92	614.01	618.01	620.11	630.24	647.3	662.53	731.75	753.75
DUP	William Montgomery*	9.04%	485	489.2	489.92	492.92	492.92	497.95	503.95	508.95	521.95	534.01	546.11	592.43	610.43
UUP	Heather Bingham-Steele	5.65%	303	303.9	305.07	305.1	307.2	312.23	313.23	318.26	332.44	348.6	518.53	549.89	554.89
Community Partnership	Mark Gordon	6.80%	365	365.8	366.7	368.7	372.73	376.76	379.76	423.03	432.12	444.21	455.33		
UUP	Aaron Jamison	4.06%	218	219.1	220.09	220.09	223.09	225.12	228.12	230.15	255.24	275.3			
UKIP	William Ferguson	1.90%	102	102.2	102.83	102.83	104.89	107.92	148.95	150.05	164.11				
NI Conservatives	Dean Russell	2.35%	126	126.1	126.97	127	127.1	129.16	133.16	136.16					
Community Partnership	Karen Worrall	1.42%	76	76.3	76.78	77.78	78.78	84.78	86.81						
UKIP	Stuart Tanner	1.36%	73	73	73.06	73.06	74.06	77.09							
Independent	Ed Simpson	1.36%	44	44	44.72	61.05	70.11								
Independent	Christopher Carter	0.73%	39	39.3	39.72	42.72									
Independent	Robert Mooney	0.65%	35	35	35.57										
Electorate: 13,358 Valid: 5,367 (40.18%) Spoilt: 128 Quota: 767 Turnout: 5,495 (41.14%)

== 2005 election ==
2001: 2 x UUP, 2 x DUP, 1 x Alliance, 1 x UKUP

2005: 3 x DUP, 2 x UUP, 1 x Alliance

2001-2005 change: DUP gain from UKUP

Abbey - 6 seats
Party	Candidate	FPv%	Count									
Party	Candidate	FPv%	1	2	3	4	5	6	7	8	9	10
DUP	Ivy Cooling*	16.96%	1,044									
DUP	Wesley Irvine	13.68%	842	964.94								
UUP	Harry Dunlop	12.28%	756	766.08	768.48	791.48	818.48	871.48				
DUP	William Montgomery*	10.11%	622	653.14	750.42	766.6	804.96	859.96				
Alliance	Stephen Farry*	11.59%	713	713.9	714.38	724.38	751.38	781.56	782.88	783.44	822.8	863.8
UUP	Roberta Dunlop*	5.64%	347	352.58	353.38	358.38	375.38	458.74	475.02	479.78	593.26	773.28
Green (NI)	Kelly Andrews	6.14%	378	378.72	378.88	402.96	425.96	437.14	437.58	438.42	469.42	520.24
Independent	Irene Cree*	5.00%	308	312.14	312.94	341.28	353.28	385.68	387.88	389	446.06	
PUP	Mark Gordon	5.43%	334	338.86	341.1	347.1	349.28	380.62	380.62	382.3		
UK Unionist	Valerie Kinghan*	4.74%	292	294.88	297.6	306.78	328.78					
NI Conservatives	Dean Russell	2.83%	174	174.54	175.18	183.18						
Independent	Christopher Carter	2.29%	141	142.8	142.96							
Electorate: 12,675 Valid: 6,154 (48.55%) Spoilt: 203 Quota: 851 Turnout: 5,951 (46.95%)

== 2001 election ==
1997: 1 x UUP, 1 x Alliance, 1 x UKUP, 1 x Conservative, 1 x DUP, 1 x PUP

2001: 2 x UUP, 2 x DUP, 1 x Alliance, 1 x UKUP

1997-2001 change: UUP and DUP gain from Conservative and PUP

Abbey - 6 seats
Party	Candidate	FPv%	Count									
Party	Candidate	FPv%	1	2	3	4	5	6	7	8	9	10
DUP	Ivy Cooling*	18.11%	1,263									
UUP	Irene Cree	17.86%	1,246									
Alliance	Stephen Farry*	17.13%	1,195									
UUP	Roberta Dunlop*	12.09%	843	874.24	1,073.32							
UK Unionist	Valerie Kinghan*	13.08%	912	936.64	950.92	984.2	1,014.56					
DUP	William Montgomery	4.29%	299	462.24	464.76	468.92	477.28	491.83	498.36	527.31	572.13	705.53
PUP	Stewart Currie*	5.98%	417	431.3	441.17	470.29	476.89	482.37	489.68	515.63	551.49	648.45
Independent	Karl McLean	4.26%	297	330.3	304.29	320.93	325.33	334.81	366.95	430.23	498.27	
NI Conservatives	Lisa Fleming	2.74%	191	194.96	198.74	247.1	261.62	275.93	292.49	324.03		
Independent	Christopher Carter	2.51%	175	180.06	182.16	211.28	213.92	217.13	234.72			
Independent	William Gordon	1.28%	89	91.64	94.16	119.38	122.79	129.61				
NI Unionist	Colin Dean	1.28%	48	54.6	63	70.8	75.86					
Electorate: 13,445 Valid: 6,975 (51.88%) Spoilt: 250 Quota: 997 Turnout: 7,225 (53.74%)

== 1997 election ==
1993: 2 x UPUP, 1 x DUP, 1 x Alliance, 1 x UUP, 1 x Conservative

1997: 1 x UUP, 1 x Alliance, 1 x UKUP, 1 x Conservative, 1 x DUP, 1 x PUP

1993-1997 change: UKUP and PUP gain from UPUP (two seats)

Abbey - 6 seats
Party	Candidate	FPv%	Count						
Party	Candidate	FPv%	1	2	3	4	5	6	7
Alliance	Stephen Farry*	16.53%	650						
UK Unionist	Valerie Kinghan*	16.53%	650						
NI Conservatives	Ann Thompson*	15.18%	597						
DUP	Ivy Cooling*	11.98%	471	474.06	498.42	503.7	528.44	610.44	
UUP	Roberta Dunlop	12.26%	482	495.86	516.58	525.1	532.24	587.24	
PUP	Stewart Currie	8.75%	344	352.46	357.92	359.9	417.26	483.96	505.96
UUP	Karl McLean	8.34%	328	339.34	354.74	363.44	386.52	446.3	465.3
Ind. Unionist	Cecil Braniff*	4.20%	165	176.7	186.78	190.08	198.42		
Independent	William Gordon	2.92%	115	147.58	151.36	152.8	155.66		
Ulster Democratic	Richard McCullough	3.33%	131	134.06	137.84	138.92			
Electorate: 13,415 Valid: 3,933 (29.32%) Spoilt: 93 Quota: 562 Turnout: 4,026 (30.01%)

== 1993 election ==
1989: 2 x UPUP, 1 x DUP, 1 x Alliance, 1 x UUP, 1 x Conservative

1993: 2 x UPUP, 1 x DUP, 1 x Alliance, 1 x UUP, 1 x Conservative

1989-1993 change: No change

Abbey - 6 seats
Party	Candidate	FPv%	Count					
Party	Candidate	FPv%	1	2	3	4	5	6
UPUP	Valerie Kinghan*	18.26%	719					
Alliance	Stephen Farry	15.52%	611					
UUP	Irene Cree*	14.45%	408	539	569.13			
UPUP	Cecil Braniff*	11.53%	454	468	537.92	546.83	635.83	
NI Conservatives	Ann Thompson	9.34%	368	386	408.08	419.06	508.58	530.58
DUP	Ivy Cooling	10.41%	410	423	437.26	438.16	471.8	479.8
DUP	Geoffrey Bairsto	10.41%	403	412	420.28	421.9	442.94	460.94
Independent	William Gordon	9.29%	366	372	381.89	403.85		
UUP	Karl McLean	5.05%	199					
Electorate: 12,961 Valid: 3,938 (30.38%) Spoilt: 133 Quota: 563 Turnout: 4,071 (31.41%)

== 1989 election ==
1985: 2 x DUP, 2 x UUP, 1 x Alliance, 1 x UPUP

1989: 2 x UPUP, 1 x DUP, 1 x Conservative, 1 x Alliance, 1 x UUP

1985-1989 change: UPUP and Conservative gain from DUP and UUP

Abbey - 6 seats
Party	Candidate	FPv%	Count						
Party	Candidate	FPv%	1	2	3	4	5	6	7
UPUP	Valerie Kinghan	18.19%	745						
NI Conservatives	George Green*	13.09%	536	546.12	551.66	558.66	752.66		
UPUP	Cecil Braniff*	11.67%	478	560.50	580.36	584.80	587.46		
Alliance	James Magee*	7.30%	299	305.82	308.92	513.80	541.46	605.46	
DUP	Denny Vitty	10.47%	429	438.68	445.34	445.56	448.78	454.78	609.78
UUP	Irene Cree	8.52%	349	364.40	483.26	483.26	498.92	546.92	571.9
DUP	Ivy Cooling*	7.89%	323	332.24	337.12	337.12	338.34	349.34	462.10
NI Conservatives	Shirley McCann	6.10%	250	252.86	254.30	262.30			
Alliance	Mariam Judge	5.57%	228	229.76	229.98				
UUP	Edward Johnston	2.91%	119	128.02					
UUP	Robert Todd	1.03%	42	45.30					
Electorate: 11,789 Valid: 4,096 (34.74%) Spoilt: 188 Quota: 586 Turnout: 4,284 (36.34%)

== 1985 election ==
1985: 2 x DUP, 2 x UUP, 1 x Alliance, 1 x UPUP

Abbey - 6 seats
Party	Candidate	FPv%	Count						
Party	Candidate	FPv%	1	2	3	4	5	6	7
DUP	John McCormick*	23.64%	1,104						
UUP	George Green*	20.24%	945						
UPUP	Brian Meharg	16.40%	766						
Alliance	James Magee*	13.58%	634	653.27	670.09				
UUP	John Preston	6.34%	296	337.82	428.3	458.45	479.82	527.66	719.42
DUP	Ivy Cooling	9.79%	457	591.48	609.46	625.51	645.35	645.95	675.2
DUP	Raymond Trousdale*	2.89%	135	338.36	345.32	358.22	374.71	381.28	391.36
UUP	Ernest Jackson	1.58%	74	88.76	216.65	234.8	257.49	288.87	
Alliance	James Pettis	3.58%	167	169.87	173.06	185.21	192.1		
PUP	Kenneth McMullan	3.58%	92	106.76	111.69	118.29			
Electorate: 11,424 Valid: 4,670 (40.88%) Spoilt: 154 Quota: 668 Turnout: 4,824 (42.23%)
