= Bangor West (District Electoral Area) =

- Ards and North Down Borough Council DEA constituency

Current constituency
- Created: 2014
- Seats: 7 (1985–2014); 5 (2014–present)
- Councillors: Jennifer Gilmour (DUP); Naomi McBurney (APNI); Carl McClean (DUP); Barry McKee (GPNI); Katherine Newman (UUP)

Bangor West DEA within Ards and North Down

Bangor West DEA (1993-2014) within North Down

Bangor West is one of the seven district electoral areas (DEA) in Ards and North Down, Northern Ireland. The district elects five members to Ards and North Down Borough Council and contains the wards of Bryansburn, Kilcooley, Rathgael, Rathmore and Silverstream. Bangor West forms part of the North Down constituencies for the Northern Ireland Assembly and UK Parliament.

It was created for the 1985 local elections, replacing North Down Area B and North Down Area C which had existed since 1973, where it contained originally seven wards (Bryansburn, Clandeboye, Crawfordsburn, Dufferin, Princestown, Silverstream and Spring Hill). For the 2014 local elections, it was reduced to five wards losing areas to the new Holywood and Clandeboye DEA.

== Councillors ==
Election	Councillor (Party)	Councillor (Party)	Councillor (Party)	Councillor (Party)	Councillor (Party)	Councillor (Party)	Councillor (Party)
December 2025 Co-Option	Naomi McBurney (Alliance)	Barry McKee (Green Party)	Carl McClean (DUP)	Jennifer Gilmour (DUP)	Katherine Newman (UUP)	5 seats 2014–present	5 seats 2014–present
October 2024 Co-Option	Naomi McBurney (Alliance)	Barry McKee (Green Party)	Carl McClean (DUP)	Jennifer Gilmour (DUP)	Stephen Hollywood (UUP)	5 seats 2014–present	5 seats 2014–present
July 2024 Co-Option	Christine Creighton (Alliance)	Barry McKee (Green Party)	Carl McClean (DUP)	Jennifer Gilmour (DUP)	Stephen Hollywood (UUP)	5 seats 2014–present	5 seats 2014–present
2023	Christine Creighton (Alliance)	Barry McKee (Green Party)	Peter Martin (DUP)	Jennifer Gilmour (DUP)	Stephen Hollywood (UUP)	5 seats 2014–present	5 seats 2014–present
May 2022 Co-Option	Scott Wilson (Alliance)	Barry McKee (Green Party)	Hannah Irwin (Alliance)	Jennifer Gilmour (DUP)	Marion Smith (UUP)	5 seats 2014–present	5 seats 2014–present
2019	Scott Wilson (Alliance)	Barry McKee (Green Party)	Connie Egan (Alliance)	Jennifer Gilmour (DUP)	Marion Smith (UUP)	5 seats 2014–present	5 seats 2014–present
December 2018 Co-Option	Scott Wilson (Alliance)	Barry McKee (Green Party)	Alan Graham (DUP)	Jennifer Gilmour (DUP)	Marion Smith (UUP)	5 seats 2014–present	5 seats 2014–present
March 2018 Co-Option	Scott Wilson (Alliance)	James Hunter (Green Party)	Alan Graham (DUP)	Jennifer Gilmour (DUP)	Marion Smith (UUP)	5 seats 2014–present	5 seats 2014–present
February 2018 Co-Option	Scott Wilson (Alliance)	James Hunter (Green Party)	Alan Graham (DUP)	Alan Leslie (DUP)	Marion Smith (UUP)	5 seats 2014–present	5 seats 2014–present
October 2016 Co-Option	Scott Wilson (Alliance)	Rachel Woods (Green Party)	Alan Graham (DUP)	Alan Leslie (DUP)	Marion Smith (UUP)	5 seats 2014–present	5 seats 2014–present
2014	Scott Wilson (Alliance)	Paul Roberts (Green Party)	Alan Graham (DUP)	Alan Leslie (DUP)	Marion Smith (UUP)	5 seats 2014–present	5 seats 2014–present
2011	Anne Wilson (Alliance)	Tony Hill (Alliance)	Alan Graham (DUP)	Alan Leslie (DUP)	Marion Smith (UUP)	James McKerrow (UUP)	Brian Wilson (Alliance)/ (Green Party)/ (Independent)
2005	Anne Wilson (Alliance)	Tony Hill (Alliance)	Alan Graham (DUP)	Alan Leslie (DUP)	Marion Smith (UUP)	James McKerrow (UUP)	Brian Wilson (Alliance)/ (Green Party)/ (Independent)
2001	Anne Wilson (Alliance)	Tony Hill (Alliance)	Alan Graham (DUP)	William Keery (UKUP)	Marion Smith (UUP)	Royston Davies (UUP)	Brian Wilson (Alliance)/ (Green Party)/ (Independent)
1997	Anne Wilson (Alliance)	Eileen Bell (Alliance)	Ernest Steele (PUP)	William Keery (UKUP)	Marion Smith (UUP)	Roy Bradford (UUP)	Brian Wilson (Alliance)/ (Green Party)/ (Independent)
1993	George Green (Conservative)	Eileen Bell (Alliance)	William Baxter (DUP)	Ian Sinclair (Independent Unionist)	Hazel Bradford (UUP)	Roy Bradford (UUP)	Brian Wilson (Alliance)/ (Green Party)/ (Independent)
1989	Thomas Miskelly (Conservative)	James O'Fee (Conservative)	William Baxter (DUP)	Ann-Marie Hillen (Independent)	Hazel Bradford (UUP)	Roy Bradford (UUP)	Brian Wilson (Alliance)/ (Green Party)/ (Independent)
1985	William Bailie (Alliance)	Alan Graham (DUP)	George McMurtry (DUP)	Ian Sinclair (UPUP)	Hazel Bradford (UUP)	Cecil Braniff (UUP)	Brian Wilson (Alliance)/ (Green Party)/ (Independent)

== 2023 Election ==
2019: 2 x Alliance, 1 x DUP, 1 x UUP, 1 x Green

2023: 2 x DUP, 1 x Alliance, 1 x UUP, 1 x Green

2019–2023 Change: DUP gain from Alliance

Bangor West - 5 seats
Party	Candidate	FPv%	Count									
Party	Candidate	FPv%	1	2	3	4	5	6	7	8	9	10
Alliance	Christine Creighton †	18.06%	1,175									
DUP	Jennifer Gilmour*	15.88%	1,033	1,063	1,063.77	1,068.77	1,205.77					
UUP	Stephen Hollywood †	13.33%	867	902	903.75	911.96	976.10	996.12	1,003.33	1,185.33		
DUP	Peter Martin †	9.84%	640	649	649.35	650.35	732.42	828.88	830.95	1,045.93	1,113.13	
Green (NI)	Barry McKee*	11.33%	737	752	758.23	880.63	884.77	884.77	913.47	978.61	1,002.97	1,019.77
Alliance	Alison McWhinney	5.96%	388	392	440.02	548.91	551.91	551.91	961.60	997.02	1,005.42	1,008.78
Independent	Susan Prentice	7.84%	510	522	522.77	529.77	585.77	589.41	598.48			
Alliance	Huw Stacy	6.07%	395	398	417.67	460.81	460.81	460.81				
TUV	John Gordon	5.09%	331	348	348.35	350.35						
SDLP	Tony McCann	4.57%	297	298	301.92							
NI Conservatives	Colin Breen	2.03%	132									
Electorate: 14,486 Valid: 6,505 (44.91%) Spoilt: 83 Quota: 1,085 Turnout: 6,588 (45.48%)

== 2019 Election ==
2014: 2 x DUP, 1 x Alliance, 1 x UUP, 1 x Green

2019: 2 x Alliance, 1 x DUP, 1 x UUP, 1 x Green

2014-2019 Change: Alliance gain from DUP

Bangor West - 5 seats
Party	Candidate	FPv%	Count		
Party	Candidate	FPv%	1	2	3
Alliance	Connie Egan †	20.16%	1,151		
DUP	Jennifer Gilmour	17.34%	990		
UUP	Marion Smith*	17.20%	982		
Green (NI)	Barry McKee	16.62%	949	1,022	
Alliance	Scott Wilson*	12.32%	703	746	930.79
DUP	Alan Graham*	13.12%	749	787	791.42
NI Conservatives	Ben English	2.00%	114		
Sinn Féin	Kieran Maxwell	1.24%	71		
Electorate: 13,585 Valid: 5,709 (42.02%) Spoilt: 85 Quota: 952 Turnout: 5,794 (42.65%)

== 2014 Election ==
2014: 2 x DUP, 1 x Alliance, 1 x UUP, 1 x Green

Bangor West - 5 seats
Party	Candidate	FPv%	Count									
Party	Candidate	FPv%	1	2	3	4	5	6	7	8	9	10
UUP	Marion Smith*	16.15%	870	887	890	950						
DUP	Alan Graham*	16.08%	866	889	891	932						
DUP	Alan Leslie* †	15.80%	851	881	883	895	912					
Alliance	Scott Wilson	11.49%	619	622	686	701	709	713	713	807	1,102	
Green (NI)	Paul Roberts †††	6.42%	346	359	426	449	453	456	456	562	664	830
TUV	Robert Gordon	9.12%	491	520	521	568	573	580	586	634	646	657
Alliance	Laurence Thompson*	5.85%	315	319	403	422	425	425	425	506		
NI21	Steven Denny	6.37%	344	354	382	412	415	419	420			
NI Conservatives	Mark Brotherston	4.72%	254	272	277							
SDLP	Ingrid Logan	4.91%	264	268								
Community Partnership	Alison Blayney	3.08%	166									
Electorate: 13,479 Valid: 5,386 (39.96%) Spoilt: 62 Quota: 898 Turnout: 5,448 (40.42%)

== 2011 Election ==
2005: 2 x DUP, 2 x UUP, 2 x Alliance, 1 x Green

2011: 2 x DUP, 2 x UUP, 2 x Alliance, 1 x Independent

2005-2011 Change: Green becomes Independent

Bangor West - 7 seats
Party	Candidate	FPv%	Count										
Party	Candidate	FPv%	1	2	3	4	5	6	7	8	9	10	11
Independent	Brian Wilson*	20.86%	1,458										
DUP	Alan Graham*	15.55%	1,087										
DUP	Alan Leslie*	13.32%	931										
Alliance	Anne Wilson*	11.56%	808	1,107.28									
UUP	Marion Smith*	9.84%	688	772.28	837.8	908.36							
Alliance	Tony Hill*	6.31%	441	493.89	590.22	602.54	606.14	607.66	608.66	622.82	658.67	824.12	863.6
UUP	James McKerrow*	4.12%	288	312.08	321.05	402.53	428.93	453.63	457.93	509.31	586.4	593.12	645.89
Green (NI)	Joanne Dunlop	4.31%	301	351.74	384.5	394.02	398.22	400.5	403.6	424.48	449.1	541.19	575.81
Community Partnership	Alison Blayney	2.75%	192	199.31	202.82	206.46	210.66	211.04	329.41	349.47	356.96	366.21	
SDLP	Liam Logan	4.26%	298	325.09	337.18	339.98	341.28	341.66	342.76	347.61	355.9		
NI Conservatives	Julian Robertson	2.59%	181	196.91	201.59	210.27	213.27	215.74	216.74	239.31			
UKIP	Ade Benson	2.16%	151	164.76	167.1	184.74	190.24	191.19	195.29				
Community Partnership	Jamie Bryson	2.39%	167	168.72	170.28	171.96	176.36	176.74					
Electorate: 14,952 Valid: 6,991 (46.76%) Spoilt: 160 Quota: 874 Turnout: 7,151 (47.83%)

== 2005 Election ==
2001: 2 x UUP, 2 x Alliance, 1 x UKUP, 1 x DUP, 1 x Independent

2005: 2 x DUP, 2 x UUP, 2 x Alliance, 1 x Green

2001-2005 Change: DUP gain from UKUP, Independent joins Greens

Bangor West - 7 seats
Party	Candidate	FPv%	Count								
Party	Candidate	FPv%	1	2	3	4	5	6	7	8	9
Green (NI)	Brian Wilson*	19.83%	1,593								
DUP	Alan Graham*	18.46%	1,483								
UUP	Marion Smith*	12.74%	1,024								
Alliance	Anne Wilson*	9.42%	757	1,116.86							
DUP	Alan Leslie	7.43%	597	640.32	1,054.08						
Alliance	Tony Hill*	5.49%	441	474.82	479.62	533.57	564.37	566.47	583.54	643.54	1,061.91
UUP	James McKerrow	5.38%	432	470	478	499.19	572.83	589.83	660.69	759.07	803.16
UK Unionist	William Keery*	4.65%	374	397.56	423.8	430.04	454.36	475.36	536.16	635.51	653.03
SDLP	William Logan	6.55%	526	564	564.64	576.08	582.74	583.04	590.04	607.68	
Independent	Alan Field	3.88%	312	330.62	337.02	343	359.02	362.37	396.14		
PUP	James Rea	3.95%	317	323.46	327.94	329.24	335.82	340.92			
NI Conservatives	Julian Robertson	2.23%	179	198.76	201.32	207.56					
Electorate: 14,658 Valid: 8,035 (54.82%) Spoilt: 168 Quota: 1,005 Turnout: 8,203 (55.96%)

== 2001 Election ==
1997: 2 x UUP, 2 x Alliance, 1 x UKUP, 1 x PUP, 1 x Independent

2001: 2 x UUP, 2 x Alliance, 1 x UKUP, 1 x DUP, 1 x Independent

1997-2001 Change: DUP gain from PUP

Bangor West - 7 seats
Party	Candidate	FPv%	Count						
Party	Candidate	FPv%	1	2	3	4	5	6	7
Independent	Brian Wilson*	20.54%	1,871						
UUP	Marion Smith*	14.39%	1,311						
Alliance	Anne Wilson*	12.21%	1,112	1,608.8					
DUP	Alan Graham	10.86%	989	1,007.4	1,021.4	1,037	1,043.16	1,150.16	
UUP	Royston Davies	8.74%	796	827.6	871.2	902.6	966.44	1,077.85	
UK Unionist	William Keery*	7.42%	676	704.8	721.6	740.8	748.5	804.12	1,247.12
Alliance	Tony Hill	6.92%	630	676.8	936.4	965.2	974.86	1,003	1,025.14
UUP	Evan Ward	4.57%	416	474.8	539.6	574.4	648.18	719.4	766.28
UK Unionist	Alan Field	6.58%	599	614.2	625	637.4	642.44	686.98	
PUP	James Rea	5.91%	538	546.8	556.4	560.4	563.9		
NI Conservatives	Julian Robertson	1.89%	172	183.2	196.4				
Electorate: 15,748 Valid: 9,110 (57.85%) Spoilt: 214 Quota: 1,139 Turnout: 9,324 (59.21%)

== 1997 Election ==
1993: 2 x UUP, 2 x Alliance, 1 x DUP, 1 x Conservative, 1 x Independent Unionist

1997: 2 x UUP, 2 x Alliance, 1 x UKUP, 1 x PUP, 1 x Independent

1993-1997 Change: UKUP, PUP and Independent gain from DUP, Conservative and Independent Unionist

Bangor West - 7 seats
Party	Candidate	FPv%	Count											
Party	Candidate	FPv%	1	2	3	4	5	6	7	8	9	10	11	12
Independent	Brian Wilson*	20.32%	1,090											
UUP	Roy Bradford*	13.03%	699											
Alliance	Eileen Bell*	12.34%	662	700.61										
Alliance	Anne Wilson	7.21%	387	661.56	668.73	679.23								
UUP	Marion Smith	8.56%	459	480.45	481.45	481.45	485.97	490.95	510.32	517.18	657.86	788.86		
UK Unionist	William Keery	9.49%	509	528.11	528.11	529.01	530.89	536.61	550.73	564.2	585.85	640.36	662.36	663.86
PUP	Ernest Steele	8.18%	439	444.46	444.46	444.76	445.4	451.08	458.42	468.42	480.74	502.9	527.9	530.3
DUP	Robert Gordon	5.74%	308	310.73	311.73	311.73	312.89	312.89	317.28	466.96	490.35	508.76	523.76	523.76
Ind. Unionist	Ian Sinclair*	4.23%	227	246.11	246.5	247.1	247.62	268.22	300.12	304.2	324.05			
UUP	Royston Davies	3.54%	190	201.7	202.7	203	220.32	229.5	246.48	249.48				
DUP	Alan Graham	3.56%	191	195.68	196.07	196.07	196.47	196.77	197.77					
NI Conservatives	Julian Robertson	2.09%	112	116.68	118.07	118.37	119.05	125.03						
Alliance	Derek Bell	1.42%	76	85.75	87.75	103.65	103.93							
Independent	Robert Mooney	0.28%	15	18.12										
Electorate: 15,442 Valid: 5,364 (34.74%) Spoilt: 116 Quota: 671 Turnout: 5,480 (35.49%)

== 1993 Election ==
1989: 2 x Conservative, 2 x UUP, 1 x Alliance, 1 x DUP, 1 x Independent

1993: 2 x Alliance, 2 x UUP, 1 x DUP, 1 x Conservative, 1 x Independent Unionist

1989-1993 Change: Alliance and Independent Unionist gain from Conservative and Independent

Bangor West - 7 seats
Party	Candidate	FPv%	Count											
Party	Candidate	FPv%	1	2	3	4	5	6	7	8	9	10	11	12
Alliance	Brian Wilson*	21.91%	1,228											
DUP	William Baxter*	14.36%	805											
UUP	Hazel Bradford*	13.45%	754											
Alliance	Eileen Bell	10.76%	603	969.93										
UUP	Roy Bradford*	7.03%	394	418.64	449.04	456.32	498.67	508.46	508.46	511.24	520.32	532.92	557.6	701.43
Ind. Unionist	Ian Sinclair	5.10%	286	313.72	352.12	353.29	354.41	368.68	378.85	392.02	423.55	488.67	563.26	615.52
NI Conservatives	George Green*	6.10%	342	357.4	376.2	379.71	381.67	385.47	391.27	436.38	443.62	458.9	480.58	508.31
NI Conservatives	James O'Fee*	4.76%	267	295.16	325.56	325.95	327.77	335.57	339.17	399.07	405.35	422.39	467.67	485.3
DUP	Harold Blemings	4.41%	247	263.28	272.48	358.54	360.64	361.64	362.64	363.59	371.13	379.57	389.97	
Independent	Ann-Marie Foster*	2.64%	148	157.68	218.48	218.74	219.02	226.1	246.34	249.94	285.66	361.6		
Independent	Arthur Gadd	2.05%	115	123.8	143.4	143.79	143.93	149.37	210.64	212.64	260.33			
Independent	Ernest Steele	2.59%	145	157.32	174.12	174.77	174.91	180.31	194.63	194.63				
NI Conservatives	Elizabeth Maguire	2.02%	113	120.04	132.84	133.88	134.72	137.52	137.52					
Independent	Robert Mooney	1.80%	101	105.4	121.4	121.53	121.67	125.87						
Independent	Edward Lindsay	1.03%	58	61.96	72.76	72.89	72.96							
Electorate: 15,097 Valid: 5,606 (37.13%) Spoilt: 189 Quota: 701 Turnout: 5,795 (38.39%)

== 1989 Election ==
1985: 2 x UUP, 2 x Alliance, 2 x DUP, 1 x UPUP

1989: 2 x Conservative, 2 x UUP, 1 x Alliance, 1 x DUP, 1 x Independent

1985-1989 Change: Conservatives (two seats) and Independent gain from Alliance, DUP and UPUP

Bangor West - 7 seats
Party	Candidate	FPv%	Count									
Party	Candidate	FPv%	1	2	3	4	5	6	7	8	9	10
UUP	Hazel Bradford*	10.73%	698	707	710	716	748	880				
DUP	William Baxter	7.10%	462	497	498	502	551	573	575.5	829.5		
Alliance	Brian Wilson*	10.71%	697	699	763	779	789	802	808	817		
Independent	Ann-Marie Hillen	8.25%	537	540	549	701	725	741	742.5	764.5	902.5	
NI Conservatives	Thomas Miskelly	9.62%	626	629	632	643	664	694	695.5	703.5	763.5	794.5
NI Conservatives	James O'Fee	8.81%	573	579	580	587	597	623	624.5	641.5	717	744
UUP	Roy Bradford	6.19%	403	408	409	411	443	534	581	650	693	706
NI Conservatives	Jack Preston	8.25%	537	550	551	556	577	605	605	613	662	673
Alliance	William Bailie*	6.36%	414	416	471	473	476	491	491.5	493.5		
DUP	Alan Graham*	5.34%	347	398	402	404	429	453	457.5			
UUP	Terence McKeag	6.09%	396	397	398	399	425					
PUP	Thomas O'Brien	4.86%	316	327	328	329						
Independent	Colin Simpson	3.24%	211	212	212							
Alliance	Eileen Bell	2.23%	145	145								
DUP	Elizabeth McMurtry	2.08%	135									
PUP	Samuel Meneely	0.14%	9									
Electorate: 15,249 Valid: 6,506 (42.67%) Spoilt: 147 Quota: 814 Turnout: 6,653 (43.63%)

== 1985 Election ==
1985: 2 x UUP, 2 x Alliance, 2 x DUP, 1 x UPUP

Bangor West - 7 seats
Party	Candidate	FPv%	Count									
Party	Candidate	FPv%	1	2	3	4	5	6	7	8	9	10
UUP	Hazel Bradford*	26.01%	1,695									
DUP	Alan Graham*	14.89%	970									
Alliance	William Bailie*	14.01%	913									
UUP	Cecil Braniff*	6.53%	414	856.52								
Alliance	Brian Wilson*	10.53%	686	719.28	721.04	742.44	743.76	744.56	760.63	778.88	1,008.88	
DUP	George McMurtry	5.85%	381	419.48	540.76	541.86	654.12	655.57	675.88	747.77	752.92	760.92
UPUP	Ian Sinclair	7.75%	505	551.8	555.48	558.58	564.1	565.2	539.84	630.43	663.09	695.09
UUP	Edward Lindsay	1.81%	118	269.84	274	277.4	287.76	319.71	489.03	538.36	596.81	688.81
Alliance	Alfred Mairs	4.01%	261	298.96	299.76	358.96	364.28	365.03	386.66	392.98		
PUP	Thomas O'Brien	4.10%	267	282.6	284.68	284.88	292.52	292.97	297.01			
UUP	William Smiley	2.64%	172	262.48	264.08	265.08	278.2	283.05				
DUP	William Swain	2.06%	134	145.96	164.68	164.78						
Electorate: 14,384 Valid: 6,516 (45.30%) Spoilt: 153 Quota: 815 Turnout: 6,669 (46.36%)
