= 1985 North Down Borough Council election =

Northern Ireland local election

← 1981	15 May 1985	1989 →

All 24 seats to North Down Borough Council 13 seats needed for a majority
	First party	Second party	Third party
Party	UUP	Alliance	DUP
Seats won	8	7	6
Seat change	▲4	▲1	▲1
	Fourth party	Fifth party	Sixth party
Party	UPUP	Ind. Unionist	Unionist Party NI
Seats won	2	1	0
Seat change	▼1	0	▼1

Elections to North Down Borough Council were held on 15 May 1985 on the same day as the other Northern Irish local government elections. The election used four district electoral areas to elect a total of 24 councillors.

== Election results ==
North Down Borough Council Election Result 1985
Party	Seats	Gains	Losses	Net gain/loss	Seats %	Votes %	Votes	+/−
UUP	8	4	0	▲4	33.3	32.3	7,115	▼9.7
Alliance	7	1	0	▲1	29.2	26.3	5,801	▲1.1
DUP	6	1	0	▲1	25.0	23.3	5,131	▼7.8
UPUP	2	0	1	▼1	8.3	9.7	2,140	▼7.9
Ind. Unionist	1	0	0	0	4.2	4.0	871	▼2.0
Independent	0	0	0	0	0.0	2.7	585	▲2.7
PUP	0	0	0	0	0.0	1.7	377	▲0.6

Note: "Votes" are the first preference votes.

== Districts summary ==
Results of the North Down Borough Council election, 1985 by district
Ward	%	Cllrs	%	Cllrs	%	Cllrs	%	Cllrs	%	Cllrs	Total Cllrs
Ward	UUP		Alliance		DUP		UPUP		Others		Total Cllrs
Abbey	28.2	2	17.2	1	36.3	2	16.3	1	2.0	0	6
Ballyholme and Groomsport	36.8	2	28.5	2	22.8	2	7.8	1	4.1	0	6
Bangor West	28.5	2	27.7	2	19.8	1	9.3	0	9.6	1	7
Holywood	35.1	2	30.5	2	15.7	1	6.5	0	12.2	0	5
Total	32.3	8	26.3	7	23.3	6	9.7	2	8.4	0	24

== District results ==
=== Abbey ===
1985: 2 x DUP, 2 x UUP, 1 x Alliance, 1 x UPUP

Abbey - 6 seats
Party	Candidate	FPv%	Count						
Party	Candidate	FPv%	1	2	3	4	5	6	7
DUP	John McCormick*	23.64%	1,104						
UUP	George Green*	20.24%	945						
UPUP	Brian Meharg	16.40%	766						
Alliance	James Magee*	13.58%	634	653.27	670.09				
UUP	John Preston	6.34%	296	337.82	428.3	458.45	479.82	527.66	719.42
DUP	Ivy Cooling	9.79%	457	591.48	609.46	625.51	645.35	645.95	675.2
DUP	Raymond Trousdale*	2.89%	135	338.36	345.32	358.22	374.71	381.28	391.36
UUP	Ernest Jackson	1.58%	74	88.76	216.65	234.8	257.49	288.87	
Alliance	James Pettis	3.58%	167	169.87	173.06	185.21	192.1		
PUP	Kenneth McMullan	3.58%	92	106.76	111.69	118.29			
Electorate: 11,424 Valid: 4,670 (40.88%) Spoilt: 154 Quota: 668 Turnout: 4,824 (42.23%)

=== Ballyholme and Groomsport ===
1985: 2 x UUP, 2 x Alliance, 1 x DUP, 1 x Independent Unionist

Ballyholme and Groomsport - 6 seats
Party	Candidate	FPv%	Count							
Party	Candidate	FPv%	1	2	3	4	5	6	7	8
UUP	Bruce Mulligan*	14.81%	893							
Ind. Unionist	Edmund Mills*	14.44%	871							
DUP	Alan Leslie	13.18%	795	809	1,181					
UUP	Samuel Hamilton	10.11%	610	722	728	870				
Alliance	Jane Copeland	7.71%	465	477	479	484	485.8	486.57	486.66	899.66
Alliance	Donald Hayes*	12.22%	737	758	759	770	777.52	778.71	778.89	833.89
UPUP	Valerie Kinghan	9.27%	559	583	610	710	725.2	728.98	736.63	744.63
Alliance	Sylvia Anderson	7.81%	471	480	480	483	484.8	485.22	485.22	
DUP	Elizabeth Loan	6.62%	399	417						
DUP	Enid Stringer	3.53%	213							
PUP	Samuel Meneely	0.30%	18							
Electorate: 12,532 Valid: 6,031 (48.12%) Spoilt: 93 Quota: 862 Turnout: 6,124 (48.87%)

=== Bangor West ===
1985: 2 x UUP, 2 x Alliance, 2 x DUP, 1 x UPUP

Bangor West - 7 seats
Party	Candidate	FPv%	Count									
Party	Candidate	FPv%	1	2	3	4	5	6	7	8	9	10
UUP	Hazel Bradford*	26.01%	1,695									
DUP	Alan Graham*	14.89%	970									
Alliance	William Bailie*	14.01%	913									
UUP	Cecil Braniff*	6.53%	414	856.52								
Alliance	Brian Wilson*	10.53%	686	719.28	721.04	742.44	743.76	744.56	760.63	778.88	1,008.88	
DUP	George McMurtry	5.85%	381	419.48	540.76	541.86	654.12	655.57	675.88	747.77	752.92	760.92
UPUP	Ian Sinclair	7.75%	505	551.8	555.48	558.58	564.1	565.2	539.84	630.43	663.09	695.09
UUP	Edward Lindsay	1.81%	118	269.84	274	277.4	287.76	319.71	489.03	538.36	596.81	688.81
Alliance	Alfred Mairs	4.01%	261	298.96	299.76	358.96	364.28	365.03	386.66	392.98		
PUP	Thomas O'Brien	4.10%	267	282.6	284.68	284.88	292.52	292.97	297.01			
UUP	William Smiley	2.64%	172	262.48	264.08	265.08	278.2	283.05				
DUP	William Swain	2.06%	134	145.96	164.68	164.78						
Electorate: 14,384 Valid: 6,516 (45.30%) Spoilt: 153 Quota: 815 Turnout: 6,669 (46.36%)

=== Holywood ===
1985: 2 x UUP, 2 x Alliance, 1 x DUP

Holywood - 5 seats
Party	Candidate	FPv%	Count			
Party	Candidate	FPv%	1	2	3	4
UUP	Ellie McKay*	16.36%	786	944		
UUP	John Auld*	16.32%	784	882		
DUP	Gordon Dunne*	13.62%	654	813		
Alliance	Susan O'Brien*	15.93%	765	793	819	
Alliance	Michael Clarke*	14.62%	702	720	738	758
Independent	Dennis Ogborn	12.18%	585	629	675	694
UPUP	James White	6.45%	310			
UUP	Roger Lomas	2.39%	115			
DUP	Elizabeth Graham	2.12%	102			
Electorate: 9,824 Valid: 4,803 (48.89%) Spoilt: 93 Quota: 801 Turnout: 4,896 (49.84%)
