= Bangor (Northern Ireland Parliament constituency) =

Constituency of the Northern Ireland Parliament (1969–1972)

Coordinates: 54.655°N 5.675°W

- Former county constituency for the House of Commons of Northern Ireland
- County: County Down

1969–1973
- Seats: 1
- Created from: North Down

Bangor was a county constituency of the Parliament of Northern Ireland which elected one member of parliament on the electoral system of first-past-the-post from 1969 to 1972.

== Boundaries ==
Bangor was created by the Electoral Law Act (Northern Ireland) 1968 as a division of County Down. It was located to the east of Belfast. Before 1969, the area formed part of the constituency of North Down. Its area was defined as:

The part of the rural district of North Down which consists of the district electoral division of Groomsport, and the borough of Bangor.

== History ==
The constituency sent one MP to the House of Commons of Northern Ireland at the 1969 general election. The Parliament was prorogued on 30 March 1972, under the terms of the Northern Ireland (Temporary Provisions) Act 1972. It was abolished in 1973 when the Northern Ireland Constitution Act 1973 received royal assent on 18 July 1973.

== Member of Parliament ==
Year	Member	Party
1969	Bertie McConnell	Ind. Unionist
1972	Bertie McConnell	Alliance

== Election result ==
General Election 24 February 1969: Bangor
Party	Candidate	Votes	%	±%
Ind. Unionist	Bertie McConnell	7,714	59.8	
UUP	Robert Campbell	5,190	40.2	
Majority		2,524	19.6	
Turnout		12,904	61.8	
Ind. Unionist win (new seat)				

== Sources ==
- Elliott, Sydney, ed. (1973). Northern Ireland Parliamentary Election Results 1921–1972. Political Reference Publications.
- "Northern Ireland House of Commons, 1921–1972". ARK. 9 June 2000.
