= Robert Campbell (Northern Ireland politician) =

Northern Irish unionist politician

Member of North Down Borough Council
- In office 30 May 1973 – 18 May 1977
- Preceded by: Council established
- Succeeded by: Maisie McMullan
- Constituency: North Down Area C

Member of the Northern Ireland Assembly for North Down
- In office 28 June 1973 – 1974
- Preceded by: Assembly founded
- Succeeded by: Assembly abolished

Personal details
- Born: 1914 (age 111–112) County Down, Northern Ireland
- Party: Unionist Party NI (from 1974)
- Other political affiliations: Ulster Unionist (until 1974)

Robert Victor Campbell (born 1914) was a Northern Irish unionist politician.

Campbell was educated at the Coleraine Academical Institution and the Belfast Technical College.

== Political career ==
Campbell was an Ulster Unionist Party (UUP) alderman in North Down, and on 23 November 1972, he was made a freeman of the Borough of North Down – only the sixth person to receive the title. At the 1973 Northern Ireland local elections, he was elected to the reconstituted North Down Borough Council, topping the poll in North Down C, and he was also elected at the 1973 Northern Ireland Assembly election in North Down.

Campbell subsequently resigned from the UUP and joined the Unionist Party of Northern Ireland. He stood again in North Down for the Northern Ireland Constitutional Convention, but was not elected, and did not contest his council seat in 1977.

Northern Ireland Assembly (1973)
New assembly	Assembly Member for North Down; 1973–1974	Assembly abolished
