= Bertie McConnell =

Member of North Down Borough Council
- In office 30 May 1973 – 20 May 1981
- Preceded by: Council established
- Succeeded by: Donald Hayes
- Constituency: North Down Area A

Member of the Constitutional Convention for North Down
- In office 1975–1976

Member of the Northern Ireland Assembly for North Down
- In office 1973–1974

Member of the Northern Ireland Parliament for Bangor
- In office 1969–1973

Member of Bangor Borough Council
- In office 1958–1973

Personal details
- Born: 27 March 1921 Bangor, County Down, Northern Ireland
- Died: 28 May 1994 (aged 73)
- Party: Alliance Party (from 1972)
- Other political affiliations: Independent Unionist (1958 - 1969)

Robert Dodd McConnell, known as Bertie McConnell (27 March 1921 – 28 May 1994) was a Northern Irish politician and an Army officer.

== Background ==
McConnell was born in Bangor, County Down, and served in the British Army in World War II. Entering the Officer Training Corps in 1940 after dropping out from Queen's College, he was commissioned into the Royal Army Service Corps in 1941 as a Second Lieutenant. During the war, he lost sight in one eye and was discharged as a captain in March 1945.

In 1958, McConnell was elected to Bangor Borough Council, serving until 1973. He was elected at the 1969 Northern Ireland general election, as an unofficial Unionist Member of Parliament for Bangor. Despite being an independent, he was a supporter of Ulster Unionist Party Prime Minister Terence O'Neill.

McConnell joined the Alliance Party of Northern Ireland alongside Phelim O'Neill and Tom Gormley in early 1972. He was elected to North Down Borough Council in 1973, and to the Northern Ireland Assembly for North Down. He held this seat on the Northern Ireland Constitutional Convention in 1975, and served as the President of the Alliance Party in 1976.

McConnell stood down from his council seat in 1981 and took no further role in active politics.

Parliament of Northern Ireland
New constituency	Member of Parliament for Bangor; 1969–1973	Parliament abolished
Northern Ireland Assembly (1973)
New assembly	Assembly Member for North Down; 1973–1974	Assembly abolished
Northern Ireland Constitutional Convention
New convention	Member for North Down; 1975–1976	Convention dissolved
Party political offices
Preceded by Joseph Magowan	President of the Alliance Party of Northern Ireland; 1976	Succeeded by ?
