= Northern Ireland Conservatives =

Northern Irish branch of the UK Conservative Party

- President: Graham Brady
- Chairman: Paul Leeman
- Founded: 1989; 37 years ago
- Headquarters: Scottish Provident Building, 7 Donegall Square West, Belfast, BT1 6JH
- Youth wing: Young Conservatives
- Ideology: Conservatism; Economic liberalism; British unionism
- Political position: Centre-right
- National affiliation: Conservative Party
- European affiliation: European Conservatives and Reformists
- International affiliation: International Democrat Union
- Colours: Blue
- House of Commons (NI Seats): 0 / 18
- House of Lords: 1 / 772
- NI Assembly: 0 / 90
- Local government: 0 / 461

Website
- niconservatives.com

The Northern Ireland Conservatives are the Northern Irish branch of the Conservative Party in the United Kingdom. The Conservatives are the only political party to field candidates in both Great Britain and Northern Ireland rather than endorse a Northern Ireland-specific party, and typically only contests a fraction of Northern Irish seats in elections. The party won 0.03% of the vote in the 2022 Northern Ireland Assembly election and 0.1% of the vote in the 2024 United Kingdom General election in Northern Ireland.

From 2009 to 2012, the party was in an electoral alliance with the Ulster Unionist Party (UUP), whereby the two parties fielded joint candidates for the 2009 European Parliament election and 2010 UK general election under the banner of "Ulster Conservatives and Unionists - New Force".

== History ==
=== Before 1922 ===
The Conservative Party was first represented in Ireland in the form of the Irish Conservative Party, which operated across the island. The Irish Conservatives became part of the Irish Unionist Alliance (IUA) in 1891. By this stage, the Conservatives' electoral base was largely restricted to Ulster and Dublin. The IUA's Members of Parliament took the Conservative Party whip at Westminster, but the organisation retained a level of independence. Following the establishment of the Irish Free State in 1922, the IUA dissolved. Its successor in Northern Ireland was the Ulster Unionist Party (UUP).

=== 1922–1972 ===
From 1922, the Conservative Party maintained formal links with the UUP, its members taking the Conservative whip in the Parliament of the United Kingdom, much like the then-independent Unionist Party of Scotland, which integrated into the party in England and Wales in the 1960s. This relationship broke down in 1972, following Unionist opposition to the proposed Sunningdale Agreement, when all but one of the UUP MPs resigned the Conservative whip. The sole exception, Stratton Mills, left the UUP and continued to take the whip for a further year, before joining the Alliance Party of Northern Ireland. Another UUP MP, Robin Chichester-Clark, became Minister of State for Employment in the Conservative government from April 1972 to February 1974.

=== Entry into Northern Ireland ===
The Conservative Party did not organise in Northern Ireland until the late 1980s, when three Unionist members of North Down Borough Council, including George Green, defected to the party. The party doubled its representation there in the local government elections of 1989, becoming the largest party on the council. An Independent Conservative also won a seat on Lisburn Borough council, although he joined the UUP before the 1993 local elections. In the 1989 European Elections the Conservative candidate polled 4.8% and was just 2,000 first preference votes behind the Alliance Party candidate.

Subsequently, the Conservatives were boosted by a number of other defectors. Former UUP Assembly members Dorothy Dunlop and Billy Bleakes defected in Belfast and Lisburn respectively, while Robert Mitchell, a former Stormont MP, defected in Coleraine. Mary Ardill, wife of prominent former Stormont MP Austin Ardill, joined in Carrick; Gary Haggan defected from the Democratic Unionist Party (DUP) in Larne, and independent unionist and former DUP politician Billy Dickson in Belfast. Lloyd Hall-Thompson, another retired former UUP Stormont politician, became chair of the local Lagan Valley branch.

The 1992 general election saw the Conservatives stand in Northern Ireland for the first time. Laurence Kennedy came closest to winning a seat in North Down, finishing second behind James Kilfedder and gaining 32% of the vote.

=== Relationship with the Ulster Unionist Party ===
The Conservatives have for some time maintained a close relationship with the UUP. The former UUP leader and First Minister, David Trimble was elevated to the House of Lords on losing his Commons seat. Shortly after standing down from the Northern Ireland Assembly in 2007, he took the Conservative whip. On doing so he made it clear that he would not be campaigning on behalf of the Northern Ireland Conservatives in opposition to his former party.

In July 2008, David Cameron and Sir Reg Empey announced a working group to develop a partnership with the UUP. This was implemented in 2009, forming the "Ulster Conservatives and Unionists" for certain electoral purposes, though the Vice Chairman of Conservatives NI, Jeffrey Peel, resigned from the Joint Committee created by both parties. Also, Lady Sylvia Hermon, the UUP MP for North Down, resigned the UUP whip in March 2010 in protest at the tie-up.

The two parties stood as the Ulster Conservatives and Unionists – New Force at the 2009 European Parliament election and 2010 UK General Election.

=== Relaunch as NI Conservatives ===
On 14 June 2012, the Conservatives in Northern Ireland were relaunched as NI Conservatives. The party is now autonomous on devolved matters, although it remains a full part of the national Conservative and Unionist Party. The party had a councillor on Larne Council, Dr Brian Dunn. Dunn was first elected as a UUP candidate in 2001, and was last elected as an independent before joining the Conservatives. He did not stand for re-election in 2014 for health reasons. The party nominated Mark Brotherston as its candidate in the European Parliament elections in 2014, but he failed to be elected, coming last with 0.7% of first preference votes.

The party stood in 16 out of the 18 Northern Ireland constituencies at the 2015 general election, although most of its candidates were from outside Northern Ireland. Although the Conservative Party won a majority of seats UK-wide, the party received only 1.3% of the vote in Northern Ireland (9,055 votes) and failed to win any seats.

NI Conservative vote share by percentage in the 2015 General Election

The party regained a council seat when former UUP Coleraine ex-Mayor and Causeway Coast and Glens councillor David Harding joined the party.

They stood 12 candidates in 11 of the 18 constituencies in the 2016 Assembly elections. They won no seats, with candidates obtaining between 0.1% and 2.1% of the first preference votes. They stood one candidate each in 13 of the 18 constituencies in the 2017 Assembly elections, but won no seats. The Northern Ireland Conservatives stood candidates in 7 of the 18 constituencies in the 2017 general election. They won a total of 3,895 votes and no seats.

The party nominated Amandeep Singh Bhogal as its candidate for the 2019 European Parliament election, but he was not elected, coming last with 662 first preference votes (0.12%).

== Organisation ==
=== Chairman ===
#	Leader	Term start	Term end
1	Irwin Armstrong	2012	2014
2	Harry Cullen	2014	2016
3	Alan Dunlop	2016	2019
4	Neil Johnston	2019	2020
5	Alan Dunlop	2020	2021
6	Matthew Robinson	2021	2023
7	Paul Leeman	2023	incumbent

=== People ===
As of the NI Conservatives AGM in June 2024, the members of the Executive Council are as follows:

- President - Graham Stuart Brady, Baron Brady of Altrincham, PC
- Vice President - Vacant
- Vice President - Lynn Jervis
- Chairman - Paul Leeman
- Deputy Chairman (Political) - Jason Reid
- Deputy Chairman (Membership) - Ailyn Majury
- Treasurer - Frank Shivers

Officers as of 2023 include;

- East Belfast Officer - Jamie Clough
- North Down Officer - Ailyn Majury
- Lagan Valley Officer - Iain Lees

Constituency Representatives are also situated within the structure of the party with representatives sitting on the federation council.

== Policy ==
The party in Northern Ireland was largely opposed to the Good Friday Agreement, in contrast to the national leadership who were in favour.

== Election results ==
The Northern Ireland Conservatives have a low support base, attracting 0.5% of the poll (3,500 votes) in the 2007 Assembly election. As of 2019, they have no elected representatives in the Northern Ireland Assembly, Local Government or Parliament.

The party's best performance came in the 1992 general election, when party candidates polled 44,608 votes across Northern Ireland: 5.7% of the total. Its best performance came in the North Down constituency, where the local party chairman, Laurence Kennedy, came second, 5,000 votes behind the sitting MP James Kilfedder.

Subsequently, the party declined rapidly. In the 1993 council elections, the party lost five council seats, being reduced to six councillors across Northern Ireland. In North Down, the party's support more than halved, from 25% in 1989 to 11% in 1993, although they narrowly managed to win a seat in all four North Down electoral areas. Laurence Kennedy quit Northern Irish politics a few months later, while the party's councillors in Lisburn and Carrick left the party to sit as Independent Unionists. In 1997 they were reduced to two council seats in North Down. Both councillors retired before the 2001 council elections and the party failed to defend one of its seats in 2001 with the other lost, leaving them without elected representation in Northern Ireland.

In the 2024 general election, the party gained a total of 553 votes across NI; this was down from their 2019 election share.

=== Westminster elections ===
For results of other NI parties which were affiliated historically with the Conservatives, see the following pages:

- 1835–1886
- 1892–1918
- 1922–1974

Election	House of Commons	Votes	Vote %	Seats	Government
1992	51st	44,608	5.7% (in NI); 41.9% (in UK)	0 / 17	Conservative Party
1997	52nd	9,858	1.2% (in NI); 30.7% (in UK)	0 / 18	Labour Party
2001	53rd	2,422	0.3% (in NI); 31.7% (in UK)	0 / 18	Labour Party
2005	54th	2,718	0.4% (in NI); 32.4% (in UK)	0 / 18	Labour Party
2010	55th	102,631 (UCU-NF)	15.2% (in NI); 36.1% (in UK)	0 / 18	Conservative-Liberal Democrat coalition
2015	56th	9,055	1.3% (in NI); 36.9% (in UK)	0 / 18	Conservative Party
2017	57th	3,895	0.5% (in NI); 42.3% (in UK)	0 / 18	Conservative Party-DUP agreement
2019	58th	5,433	0.7% (in NI); 43.6% (in UK)	0 / 18	Conservative Party
2024	59th	553	0.1% (in NI); 23.7% (in UK)	0 / 18	Labour Party

=== Devolved legislature elections ===
Election	Legisture	Votes	Share of votes	Seats	Note(s)
1996	Northern Ireland Forum	3,595	0.48	0 / 110	
1998	Northern Ireland Assembly	1,835	0.23	0 / 108	
2003	Northern Ireland Assembly	1,604	0.20	0 / 108	
2007	Northern Ireland Assembly	3,457	0.50	0 / 108	
2016	Northern Ireland Assembly	2,554	0.40	0 / 108	
2017	Northern Ireland Assembly	2,399	0.30	0 / 90	
2022	Northern Ireland Assembly	254	0.03	0 / 90	

=== Local government elections ===
Election	First Preference Vote	Vote %	Seats
1989	5,204	0.8%	6 / 565
1993	9,438	1.0%	6 / 582
1997	2,634	0.4%	3 / 575
2001	1,985	0.3%	0 / 582
2005	1,164	0.2%	0 / 582
2011	1,321	0.2%	0 / 583
2014	2,527	0.4%	0 / 462
2019	1,364	0.2%	0 / 462
2023	438	0.1%	0 / 462

=== European elections ===
Election	First Preference Vote	Vote %	Seats
1989	25,789	4.8%	0 / 3
1994	5,583	1.0%	0 / 3
2009 (UCUNF)	82,892	17.0%	1 / 3
2014	4,144	0.7%	0 / 3
2019	662	0.1%	0 / 3

== See also ==
- Scottish Conservatives
- Welsh Conservatives
- Labour Party in Northern Ireland
