= Gordon Dunne =

Northern Irish politician (1959–2021)

Gordon Dunne MBE
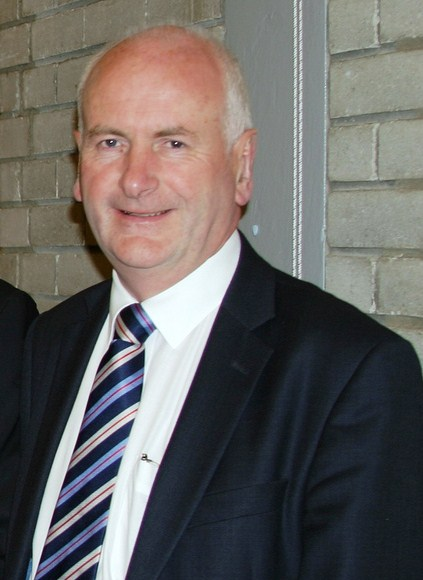

Member of the Legislative Assembly for North Down
- In office 5 May 2011 – 9 June 2021
- Preceded by: Alan McFarland
- Succeeded by: Stephen Dunne

Member of North Down Borough Council
- In office 21 May 1997 – 22 May 2014
- Preceded by: James White
- Succeeded by: Council abolished
- Constituency: Holywood
- In office 15 May 1985 – 19 May 1993
- Preceded by: District created
- Succeeded by: James White
- Constituency: Holywood
- In office 20 May 1981 – 15 May 1985
- Preceded by: Frederick White
- Succeeded by: District abolished
- Constituency: North Down Area D

Personal details
- Born: 4 April 1959 Enniskillen, County Fermanagh, Northern Ireland
- Died: 20 June 2021 (aged 62)
- Party: Democratic Unionist

Gordon Dunne MBE (4 April 1959 – 20 June 2021) was a Democratic Unionist Party (DUP) politician who was a Member of the Northern Ireland Assembly (MLA) for North Down from 2011 until June 2021.

== Biography ==
Born in Enniskillen, County Fermanagh, Dunne was first elected to North Down Borough Council in the 1981 local elections representing the Holywood area. He was re-elected in 1985 and 1989. He lost his seat in the 1993 local elections but regained it in 1997 and sat on the council since then. He resigned from the assembly effective 9 June 2021 for health reasons, and his son Stephen was subsequently co-opted to the role.

On 20 June 2021, eleven days after his resignation, Dunne died of cancer, aged 62.

Northern Ireland Assembly
| Preceded by Alan McFarland | MLA for North Down; 2011–2021 | Succeeded by Stephen Dunne |
