= George Green (politician) =

Northern Irish unionist politician

Member of North Down Borough Council
- In office 19 May 1993 – 21 May 1997
- Preceded by: Thomas Miskelly
- Succeeded by: Anne Wilson
- Constituency: Bangor West
- In office 15 May 1985 – 19 May 1993
- Preceded by: District created
- Succeeded by: Ann Thompson
- Constituency: Abbey
- In office 30 May 1973 – 15 May 1985
- Preceded by: Council created
- Succeeded by: District abolished
- Constituency: North Down Area B

Member of the Northern Ireland Constitutional Convention for North Down
- In office 1975–1976

Personal details
- Party: NI Conservative (from 1989)
- Other political affiliations: UUP (1985–89); UPUP (1980–85); UUUP (1975–80); Vanguard (1973–75); Independent Loyalist (1973)

George Green was a Northern Irish unionist politician.

== Biography ==
Green was the chairman of the Ulster Special Constabulary Association (USCA), a group which focussed on opposition to the Irish Republican Army. He was elected to North Down Borough Council in 1973 as an independent loyalist.

At the 1973 Northern Ireland Assembly election, Green stood in North Down for the Vanguard Unionist Progressive Party, but he was not elected. Through his role in the USCA, he was a prominent leader of the Ulster Workers' Council strike, and was able to gain election to the Northern Ireland Constitutional Convention. Soon after, he left Vanguard to join the United Ulster Unionist Party split, but this was collapsing by 1980, and Green instead joined James Kilfedder's Ulster Popular Unionist Party, for which he very narrowly missed being elected to the Northern Ireland Assembly, 1982.

Green left the Popular Unionists, and was re-elected at the 1985 local elections for the Ulster Unionist Party, then in 1989 and 1993 for the Conservatives in Northern Ireland, standing down in 1997.

Northern Ireland Constitutional Convention
New convention	Member for North Down; 1975–1976	Convention dissolved
