= Brian Wilson (Northern Ireland politician) =

Independent politician in Northern Ireland (born 1943)

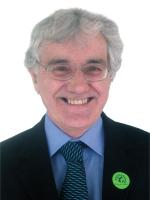

Mayor of North Down
- In office 1993–1994
- Preceded by: Leslie Cree
- Succeeded by: Roy Bradford

Member of North Down Borough Council
- In office 15 May 1985 – 22 May 2014
- Preceded by: District created
- Succeeded by: Council abolished
- Constituency: Bangor West
- In office 20 May 1981 – 15 May 1985
- Preceded by: Thomas Rollins
- Succeeded by: District abolished
- Constituency: North Down Area C

Member of the Legislative Assembly for North Down
- In office 7 March 2007 – 2011
- Preceded by: Robert McCartney
- Succeeded by: Steven Agnew

Personal details
- Born: 15 May 1943 (age 83) Bangor, Northern Ireland
- Party: Independent
- Other political affiliations: Green Party (2004–2011); Alliance (1975–1997)
- Spouse: Anne Wilson
- Children: 2
- Education: Open University; University of Strathclyde
- Profession: Civil servant, Academic

Brian Wilson (born 15 May 1943) is a Northern Irish politician who was a member of North Down Borough Council for 34 years (1981–2015). He retired when local government was reformed. During this time he served as an Alliance member, Green Party and Independent. He was the first Green Party Councillor to be elected in Northern Ireland in 2005. Wilson served as the Green Party Northern Ireland’s Member of the Northern Ireland Assembly (MLA) for North Down from 2007 to 2011, and was the party’s first elected representative in the Assembly. He agreed to serve as an MLA for a single term, and stood down to be replaced by his research assistant, Steven Agnew.

== Early life ==
Wilson was born in 1943 in Bangor, County Down. He attended Trinity Primary School and Bangor Grammar School. A former civil servant in the Department of Education, he studied part-time at the Open University and in 1973 left the civil service to do a full-time master's degree in Politics at the University of Strathclyde.

== Career ==
=== Academic career ===
On his return to Northern Ireland he lectured at Omagh Technical College in 1979 from where he transferred to the College of Business Studies as a lecturer in government and economics. He was a senior lecturer at BIFHE for 24- years, until he retired in 2003.

=== Political career ===
In the 1970s he became a member of the Northern Ireland Labour Party and then joined the Alliance Party in 1975. He was elected to North Down Borough Council at the 1981 local elections and was elected mayor in 1993/1994. During this period, he unsuccessfully contested North Down in the 1982 Assembly Election. In 1996 he was an unsuccessful candidate in the Northern Ireland Forum election in North Down.

In 1997 Wilson left the Alliance Party and was elected as an independent councillor for Bangor West in 2001 topping the poll for the fourth successive election with 1871 votes (1.6 quotas). In 2003 he again stood as an independent candidate for the Assembly increasing his share of the poll by 10% and finishing tenth out of 19 candidates on the first count.

In 2004 he joined the Green Party. The following year he became the first Green Party representative to be elected to public office in Northern Ireland when he again topped the poll in Bangor West.

In 2007, he won the first Green Party's seat in the Northern Ireland Assembly, winning a seat in the North Down constituency on the 10th count, after increasing the Green vote from 730 to 2,839 first preferences. He served on the Environment Committee, DRD Committee and Privileges Committee in the Northern Ireland Assembly.

In 2011 he stood down from the Northern Ireland Assembly, in favour of his research assistant Steven Agnew who retained the seat for the Greens.

He stood instead for Bangor West seat on North Down Council, as an independent, standing against both his wife (Anne Wilson, Alliance Party) and the Green Party candidate. Both Wilson and his wife were reelected as councillors. He again topped the poll with his highest ever percentage of first preference votes (1458).

== Personal life ==
In 1979, he married Anne whom he met when studying in Scotland. They have two children and two step children.

He was a member of the Board of Governors of Rathmore Primary School from 1981 to 2011. He is presently a member of the BoG of St. Columbanus College, former member of South Eastern Education and Library Board, former member of North Down District Policing Partnership, former member of the Eastern Health Board & Health Council and former governor of the North Down & Ards Institute.

Wilson is also a member of Greenpeace, RSPB and Friends of the Earth.

Civic offices
Preceded by Ellie McKay	Mayor of North Down; 1993–1994	Succeeded by Roy Bradford
Northern Ireland Assembly
Preceded by Robert McCartney	MLA for North Down; 2007–2011	Succeeded by Steven Agnew
