= Unionist Party of Northern Ireland =

- Leader: Brian Faulkner (1974-1976); Anne Dickson (1976-1981)
- Deputy Leader: Leslie Morrell (1974-1978)
- Founded: September 1974
- Dissolved: Autumn 1981
- Split from: Ulster Unionist Party
- Ideology: Pro-Agreement; Ulster unionism

The Unionist Party of Northern Ireland was a political party founded by Brian Faulkner in September 1974.

== Formation ==
The party emerged following splits in the Ulster Unionist Party in 1973 and 1974 over the British government's white paper Northern Ireland Constitutional Proposals, the 1973 Northern Ireland Assembly election, and the Sunningdale Agreement. Faulkner had led the majority of the UUP into a power-sharing coalition but in January 1974 he was deposed as leader as the anti-Sunningdale faction of the party won control. In the February 1974 general election a number of Faulkner's followers (including several sitting MPs) stood as Pro-Assembly Unionists against a coalition of the Ulster Unionist Party, the Vanguard Progressive Unionist Party and the Democratic Unionist Party. They failed to win a single seat at Westminster, and this defeat contributed to the downfall of the power-sharing Executive established by Sunningdale. However they remained active and in September constituted themselves as the Unionist Party of Northern Ireland, committed to a return to power-sharing as a settlement for Northern Ireland.

== Electoral history ==
The party did not prosper. In the October 1974 general election they again failed to make much ground. The weakness of Faulkner's position within Unionism was reflected in the fact that only about a dozen of the approximately 250 local councillors elected for the UUP in 1973 chose to join the new party. The 1975 elections to the Northern Ireland Constitutional Convention were another blow to the party. Of 13 UPNI candidates elected as UUP members in 1973, only five succeeded in holding their seats, compared to 47 seats won by other Unionist candidates. The five UPNI members included Faulkner who suffered a personal setback in his South Down constituency. He finished in 7th place with 6,000 first preference votes in an area where he had topped the poll with 16,000 votes just two years earlier. Consequently the influence of both the UPNI and Faulkner waned.

In 1976 Faulkner stepped down as leader of the party (and withdrew from active politics) and was succeeded by Anne Dickson, the first woman to lead a political party in Northern Ireland. However the party continued to make little ground. In 1977 UPNI won just six local council seats. The 1979 Westminster election proved to be a further disappointment, as the main consequence of the party standing seemed to be to split the centre vote. In North Belfast, Dickson's 4,000 votes were greater than the DUP majority of 1,000 over the UUP. Similarly in East Belfast the DUP finished 64 votes ahead of the UUP and 900 ahead of the Alliance party with Norman Agnew taking 2,000 votes for UPNI.

In 1981 the party admitted the weakness of its own position during the local government election campaign and that power-sharing on the 1973 model was no longer a viable option. The party fought the 1981 local elections in an electoral pact with the Ulster Popular Unionist Party but only won two seats. As a result in autumn 1981 the UPNI was formally dissolved. William Bailie, their last remaining councillor, joined the Alliance Party and was re-elected as an Alliance councillor in North Down.

== Leadership ==
Faulkner himself died in a riding accident in 1977. Anne Dickson replaced him as leader of the party. However, the party had poor showings at the 1977 local elections and also the 1979 general election. The party was dissolved soon afterwards.

== Election results ==
=== February 1974 general election ===
Constituency	Candidate	Votes	%	Position
Belfast East	Stanley McMaster	20,077	34.9	2
Belfast North	David Smyth	12,755	25.9	2
Belfast South	Rafton Pounder	18,085	34.9	2
Fermanagh and South Tyrone	Hubert Brown	3,157	5.1	4
Mid Ulster	Neville Thornton	4,633	7.0	4
North Antrim	T. E. Utley	13,651	21.0	2
North Down	Roy Bradford	21,943	35.1	2

=== October 1974 general election ===
Constituency	Candidate	Votes	%	Position
Belfast East	Peter McLachlan	14,417	27.0	2
North Down	William Brownlow	6,037	10.6	3

=== 1979 general election ===
Constituency	Candidate	Votes	%	Position
Belfast East	Norman Agnew	2,017	4.0	4
Belfast North	Anne Dickson	4,220	10.0	4
Belfast South	Victor Brennan	1,784	3.8	4
