= North Down Borough Council =

Administrative territorial entity of the United Kingdom

Coordinates: 54.626°N 5.673°W

North Down Borough
- North Down Borough Council logo

- Area: 81 km^{2} (31 sq mi); Ranked 26th of 26
- District HQ: Bangor
- Catholic: 13.5%
- Protestant: 73.2%
- Country: Northern Ireland
- Sovereign state: United Kingdom
- Councillors: MLAs DUP: 3 Alliance Party: 1 Green Party: 1 UUP: 1; MPs Sylvia Hermon (Independent)

North Down Borough Council was a Local Council in County Down in Northern Ireland. It merged with Ards Borough Council in May 2015 under local government reorganisation in Northern Ireland to become North Down and Ards District Council.

Its main town was Bangor, 12 miles east of Belfast with a population of approximately 68,000. The council was headquartered in Bangor. Its secondary centre was the former Urban District of Holywood, 8 km northeast of Belfast with a population of approximately 10,000. Most of the remainder of a total population was in suburban villages along the southern shore of Belfast Lough. The area of the former Borough is heavily suburbanised, railway links with Belfast are good and the area has been the domain of Belfast commuters since the mid-19th century. The former Borough is often held to be the wealthiest area in Northern Ireland, although there are pockets of deprivation in a string of overspill public housing estates along the Bangor Ring Road.

The borough consisted of 4 electoral areas: Abbey, Ballyholme and Groomsport, Bangor West and Holywood. In the 2011 election, 25 members were elected from the following political parties: 11 Democratic Unionist Party, 6 Alliance, 4 Ulster Unionists, 1 Green, and 2 Independents. North Down along with Carrickfergus Borough Council were the only councils in Northern Ireland without Nationalist political party representation.

The Borough of North Down was formed in 1973 in the local government reorganisation from the old Bangor Urban District, Holywood Urban District, North Down Rural District and part of Castlereagh Rural District.

In elections for the Westminster Parliament it was part of the slightly larger North Down constituency.

See Also: Districts of Northern Ireland

== Summary of seats won 1973–2011 ==
Map of the borough's DEAs from 1993 to 2014

	1973	1977	1981	1985	1989	1993	1997	2001	2005	2011
Ulster Unionist (UUP)	9	7	4	8	5	6	6	8	8	4
Alliance (APNI)	7	7	6	7	4	5	6	5	6	6
Vanguard (VUPP)	2	2								
Loyalist (Loy)	2									
Unionist Party of NI (UPNI)		1	1							
United Unionist (UUUP)		1								
Independent Unionist (IU)		1	1	1	1	2	1	1	1	1
Democratic Unionist (DUP)			5	6	4	3	2	5	8	11
Popular Unionist (UPUP)			3	2	2	2				
NI Conservatives (Con)					6	4	2			
UK Unionist Party (UKUP)							3	2		
Progressive Unionist (PUP)							2			
Women's Coalition (NIWC)								1		
Green Party (GP)									1	1
Independent/Other^{†}					2	3	3	3	1	2

^{†} Others include Ann Marie Hillen, who stood under the label Better Bangor Campaign in 1989, having been elected earlier that year in a by-election. Of the candidates elected in 1993, Jimmy White was elected as a Holywood Pool Campaigner and another as Action '93. Alan Chambers, elected at every election from 1993 to 2011, has usually been described on the ballot paper as an Independent, but describes himself on the council website as an Independent Unionist and stood under that label in 1997. He is tallied as Independent Unionist above for all elections.

== 2011 Election results ==
Party		seats	change +/-
•	Democratic Unionist Party	11	+3
•	Alliance Party of Northern Ireland	6	–
•	Ulster Unionist Party	4	-4
•	Green Party in Northern Ireland	1	–
•	Independent	3	+1

== Mayor ==
Year	Name	Political affiliation
1981–82	Mary O'Fee	UPUP
1985–86	Hazel Bradford	UUP
1990–92	Denny Vitty	DUP
1992–93	Leslie Cree	UUP
1993–94	Brian Wilson	Alliance
1994–95	Roy Bradford	UUP
1995–96	Susan O'Brien	Alliance
1996–97	Irene Cree	UUP
1997–98	Ruby Cooling	DUP
1998–99	Marsden Fitzsimons	Alliance
1999–00	Marion Smith	UUP
2000–01	Alan Chambers	Independent
2001–02	Ian Henry	UUP
2002–03	Alan Graham	DUP
2003–04	Anne Wilson	Alliance
2004–05	Valerie Kinghan	UK Unionist
2005–06	Roberta Dunlop	UUP
2006–07	Alan Leslie	DUP
2007–08	Stephen Farry	Alliance
2008–09	Leslie Cree	UUP
2009–10	Tony Hill	Alliance
2010–11	John Montgomery	DUP
2011–12	James McKerrow	UUP
2012–13	Wesley Irvine	DUP
2013–14	Andrew Muir	Alliance
2014–15	Peter Martin	DUP

== Review of Public Administration ==
Under the Review of Public Administration (RPA) the council was due to merge with Ards in 2011 to form a single council for the enlarged area totalling 451 km^{2} and a population of 149,567. The next election was due to take place in May 2009, but on 25 April 2008, Shaun Woodward, Secretary of State for Northern Ireland announced that the scheduled 2009 district council elections were to be postponed until the introduction of the eleven new councils in 2011. It took place in 2015.

== Population ==
The area covered by North Down Borough Council had a population of 78,937 residents according to the 2011 Northern Ireland census.
