= Ulster Popular Unionist Party =

- Leader: James Kilfedder
- Chairman: William McIntyre
- Secretary: Valerie Kinghan
- Founded: 1980
- Dissolved: 1995
- Headquarters: Donaghadee
- Ideology: Unionism; Pro-devolution
- Political position: Centre-right

The Ulster Popular Unionist Party (UPUP) was a unionist political party in Northern Ireland. It was founded in 1980 by James Kilfedder, independent Unionist Member of Parliament for North Down, who led the party until his death in 1995. For a brief period in 1980, it was known as the Ulster Progressive Unionist Party before it adopted the "Popular" name.

== History ==
In the 1981 Northern Ireland local elections, the party took three seats on North Down Borough Council and two seats on Ards Borough Council. Two of these were in North Down 'Area B', where sitting councillor George Green, a former Vanguard Progressive Unionist Party member who had been elected to the 1975 Northern Ireland Constitutional Convention, had joined the party. The other, Gladys McIntyre, was Mayor of Ards in 1985–86.

Kilfedder won a seat for the party in North Down at the 1982 Northern Ireland Assembly election. Only a minority of his votes transferred to his running mate, George Green, who missed out on taking a second seat by just six votes. Kilfedder was subsequently elected Speaker of the Assembly.

Kilfedder held his seat in the UK Parliament at the 1983 general election with a large majority, but fared less well when he stood in the 1984 European election, taking only 2.9% of the first preference votes. A unionist pact enabled Kilfedder to easily win a by-election in 1986, when he joined the other unionist MPs in resigning in protest at the Anglo-Irish Agreement. A challenge from Bob McCartney, who stood as a "Real Unionist", led to a close election in 1987 that Kilfedder ultimately won. He then defeated a Conservative Party opponent in 1992.

The party was reduced to three councillors in 1985, and remained at this level until Kilfedder's death in 1995. George Green had defected to the Conservative Party before 1989 but the party compensated by gaining a seat in the Dundonald area of Castlereagh. Following Kilfedder's death, the three UPUP councillors went their separate ways, Valerie Kinghan to the newly formed UK Unionist Party. Thomas Jeffers to the Democratic Unionist Party and Cecil Braniff setting up a short-lived independent DUP. No party member contested the North Down by-election resulting from his death.

== Electoral performance ==
=== UK general elections ===
Election	Seats won	±	Votes	%	±
1983	1 / 17	Steady	22,861	3.0%	Steady
1987	1 / 17	Steady	18,420	2.5%	▼0.5%
1992	1 / 17	Steady	19,305	2.5%	Steady

=== Northern Ireland Assembly elections ===
Election	Seats won	±	First pref. votes	%	±
1982	1 / 78	Steady	14,916	2.3%	Steady

=== European Parliament elections ===
Election	Seats won	±	First pref. votes	%	±
1984	0 / 81	Steady	20,092	0.1%	Steady

=== Local elections ===
Election	Seats won	±	First pref. votes	%	±
1981	5 / 526	Steady	7,817	1.2%	Steady
1985	3 / 565	▼2	3,139	0.5%	▼0.7%
1989	3 / 565	Steady	1,223	0.2%	▼0.3%
1993	3 / 582	Steady	1,730	0.3%	▲0.1%
