= List of members of the 1982 Northern Ireland Assembly =

This is a list of members of the Northern Ireland Assembly elected in 1982.

All members elected to the Assembly at the 1982 election are listed. Members are grouped by party.

The Social Democratic and Labour Party and Sinn Féin members did not take their seats in the Assembly and the Ulster Unionist Party members boycotted the Assembly for five months during 1984.

== Members by party ==
This is a list of members elected in the 1982 Northern Ireland Assembly election, sorted by party.

Party	Name	Constituency
Ulster Unionist Party (27)	Fraser Agnew	South Antrim
Ulster Unionist Party (27)	Jack Allen	Londonderry
Ulster Unionist Party (27)	Roy Beggs	North Antrim
Ulster Unionist Party (27)	Billy Bell	South Antrim
Ulster Unionist Party (27)	William Bleakes	North Down
Ulster Unionist Party (27)	William Brown	South Down
Ulster Unionist Party (27)	Jeremy Burchill	Belfast East
Ulster Unionist Party (27)	John Carson	Belfast North
Ulster Unionist Party (27)	Jeffrey Donaldson	South Down
Ulster Unionist Party (27)	William Douglas	Londonderry
Ulster Unionist Party (27)	Dorothy Dunlop	Belfast East
Ulster Unionist Party (27)	Raymond Ferguson	Fermanagh and South Tyrone
Ulster Unionist Party (27)	Clifford Forsythe	South Antrim
Ulster Unionist Party (27)	Joe Gaston	North Antrim
Ulster Unionist Party (27)	Frank Millar Jr	Belfast South
Ulster Unionist Party (27)	Jim Kirkpatrick	Belfast South
Ulster Unionist Party (27)	Ken Maginnis	Fermanagh and South Tyrone
Ulster Unionist Party (27)	Robert McCartney	North Down
Ulster Unionist Party (27)	Harold McCusker	Armagh
Ulster Unionist Party (27)	James Molyneaux	South Antrim
Ulster Unionist Party (27)	Jim Nicholson	Armagh
Ulster Unionist Party (27)	Thomas Passmore	Belfast West
Ulster Unionist Party (27)	Mary Simpson	Armagh
Ulster Unionist Party (27)	Jim Speers	Armagh
Ulster Unionist Party (27)	Martin Smyth	Belfast South
Ulster Unionist Party (27)	John Taylor	North Down
Ulster Unionist Party (27)	William Thompson	Mid Ulster
Democratic Unionist Party (21)	Jim Allister	North Antrim
Democratic Unionist Party (21)	William Beattie	South Antrim
Democratic Unionist Party (21)	David Calvert	Armagh
Democratic Unionist Party (21)	Gregory Campbell	Londonderry
Democratic Unionist Party (21)	Cecil Cousley	North Antrim
Democratic Unionist Party (21)	Ivan Davis	South Antrim
Democratic Unionist Party (21)	Ivan Foster	Fermanagh and South Tyrone
Democratic Unionist Party (21)	Simpson Gibson	North Down
Democratic Unionist Party (21)	George Graham	South Down
Democratic Unionist Party (21)	Alan Kane	Mid Ulster
Democratic Unionist Party (21)	James McClure	Londonderry
Democratic Unionist Party (21)	Raymond McCrea	Belfast South
Democratic Unionist Party (21)	William McCrea	Mid Ulster
Democratic Unionist Party (21)	Jack McKee	North Antrim
Democratic Unionist Party (21)	Ian Paisley	North Antrim
Democratic Unionist Party (21)	Wesley Pentland	North Down
Democratic Unionist Party (21)	Peter Robinson	Belfast East
Democratic Unionist Party (21)	George Seawright	Belfast North
Democratic Unionist Party (21)	Roy Thompson	South Antrim
Democratic Unionist Party (21)	Denny Vitty	Belfast East
Democratic Unionist Party (21)	Jim Wells	South Down
Social Democratic and Labour Party (13)	Austin Currie	Fermanagh and South Tyrone
Social Democratic and Labour Party (13)	Sean Farren	North Antrim
Social Democratic and Labour Party (13)	Frank Feely	South Down
Social Democratic and Labour Party (13)	Denis Haughey	Mid Ulster
Social Democratic and Labour Party (13)	Joe Hendron	Belfast West
Social Democratic and Labour Party (13)	John Hume	Londonderry
Social Democratic and Labour Party (13)	Hugh Logue	Londonderry
Social Democratic and Labour Party (13)	James McDonald	South Antrim
Social Democratic and Labour Party (13)	Eddie McGrady	South Down
Social Democratic and Labour Party (13)	Mary McSorley	Mid Ulster
Social Democratic and Labour Party (13)	Hugh News	Armagh
Social Democratic and Labour Party (13)	Patrick O'Donoghue	South Down
Social Democratic and Labour Party (13)	Paschal O'Hare	Belfast North
Alliance Party of Northern Ireland (10)	Seamus Close	South Antrim
Alliance Party of Northern Ireland (10)	David Cook	Belfast South
Alliance Party of Northern Ireland (10)	John Cushnahan	North Down
Alliance Party of Northern Ireland (10)	Will Glendinning	Belfast West
Alliance Party of Northern Ireland (10)	Paul Maguire	Belfast North
Alliance Party of Northern Ireland (10)	Gordon Mawhinney	South Antrim
Alliance Party of Northern Ireland (10)	Addie Morrow	Belfast East
Alliance Party of Northern Ireland (10)	Charles Mulholland	North Down
Alliance Party of Northern Ireland (10)	Oliver Napier	Belfast East
Alliance Party of Northern Ireland (10)	Seán Neeson	North Antrim
Sinn Féin (5)	Gerry Adams	Belfast West
Sinn Féin (5)	Owen Carron	Fermanagh and South Tyrone
Sinn Féin (5)	Jim McAllister	Armagh
Sinn Féin (5)	Martin McGuinness	Londonderry
Sinn Féin (5)	Danny Morrison	Mid Ulster
Ulster Popular Unionist Party (1)	James Kilfedder	North Down
Independent Unionist (1)	Frank Millar	Belfast North

== Members by constituency ==
The list is given in alphabetical order by constituency.

Members of the Northern Ireland Forum
Constituency	Name	Party
Armagh	David Calvert	Democratic Unionist Party
Armagh	Jim Allister	Sinn Féin
Armagh	Harold McCusker	Ulster Unionist Party
Armagh	Hugh News	Social Democratic and Labour Party
Armagh	Jim Nicholson	Ulster Unionist Party
Armagh	Mary Simpson	Ulster Unionist Party
Armagh	Jim Speers ♭	Ulster Unionist Party
Belfast East	Jeremy Burchill	Ulster Unionist Party
Belfast East	Dorothy Dunlop	Ulster Unionist Party
Belfast East	Addie Morrow	Alliance Party of Northern Ireland
Belfast East	Oliver Napier	Alliance Party of Northern Ireland
Belfast East	Peter Robinson	Democratic Unionist Party
Belfast East	Denny Vitty	Democratic Unionist Party
Belfast North	John Carson	Ulster Unionist Party
Belfast North	Paul Maguire	Alliance Party of Northern Ireland
Belfast North	Frank Millar	Independent Unionist
Belfast North	Paschal O'Hare	Social Democratic and Labour Party
Belfast North	George Seawright	Democratic Unionist Party
Belfast South	David Cook	Alliance Party of Northern Ireland
Belfast South	Jim Kirkpatrick	Ulster Unionist Party
Belfast South	Raymond McCrea	Democratic Unionist Party
Belfast South	Frank Millar Jr ♭	Ulster Unionist Party
Belfast South	Martin Smyth	Ulster Unionist Party
Belfast West	Gerry Adams	Sinn Féin
Belfast West	Will Glendinning	Alliance Party of Northern Ireland
Belfast West	Joe Hendron	Social Democratic and Labour Party
Belfast West	Thomas Passmore	Ulster Unionist Party
Fermanagh and South Tyrone	Owen Carron	Sinn Féin
Fermanagh and South Tyrone	Austin Currie	Social Democratic and Labour Party
Fermanagh and South Tyrone	Raymond Ferguson	Ulster Unionist Party
Fermanagh and South Tyrone	Ivan Foster	Democratic Unionist Party
Fermanagh and South Tyrone	Ken Maginnis	Ulster Unionist Party
Londonderry	Jack Allen	Ulster Unionist Party
Londonderry	Gregory Campbell	Democratic Unionist Party
Londonderry	William Douglas	Ulster Unionist Party
Londonderry	John Hume	Social Democratic and Labour Party
Londonderry	Hugh Logue	Social Democratic and Labour Party
Londonderry	James McClure	Democratic Unionist Party
Londonderry	Martin McGuinness	Sinn Féin
Mid Ulster	Denis Haughey	Social Democratic and Labour Party
Mid Ulster	Alan Kane	Democratic Unionist Party
Mid Ulster	William McCrea	Democratic Unionist Party
Mid Ulster	Mary McSorley	Social Democratic and Labour Party
Mid Ulster	Danny Morrison	Sinn Féin
Mid Ulster	William Thompson	Ulster Unionist Party
North Antrim	Jim Allister	Democratic Unionist Party
North Antrim	Roy Beggs	Ulster Unionist Party
North Antrim	Cecil Cousley	Democratic Unionist Party
North Antrim	Sean Farren	Social Democratic and Labour Party
North Antrim	Joe Gaston	Ulster Unionist Party
North Antrim	Jack McKee	Democratic Unionist Party
North Antrim	Seán Neeson	Alliance Party of Northern Ireland
North Antrim	Ian Paisley	Democratic Unionist Party
North Down	John Cushnahan	Alliance Party of Northern Ireland
North Down	William Bleakes	Ulster Unionist Party
North Down	Simpson Gibson	Democratic Unionist Party
North Down	James Kilfedder	Ulster Popular Unionist Party
North Down	Robert McCartney	Ulster Unionist Party
North Down	Charles Mulholland	Alliance Party of Northern Ireland
North Down	Wesley Pentland	Democratic Unionist Party
North Down	John Taylor	Ulster Unionist Party
South Antrim	Fraser Agnew	Ulster Unionist Party
South Antrim	William Beattie	Democratic Unionist Party
South Antrim	Billy Bell	Ulster Unionist Party
South Antrim	Seamus Close	Alliance Party of Northern Ireland
South Antrim	Ivan Davis	Democratic Unionist Party
South Antrim	Clifford Forsythe	Ulster Unionist Party
South Antrim	Gordon Mawhinney	Alliance Party of Northern Ireland
South Antrim	James McDonald	Social Democratic and Labour Party
South Antrim	James Molyneaux	Ulster Unionist Party
South Antrim	Roy Thompson	Democratic Unionist Party
South Down	William Brown	Ulster Unionist Party
South Down	Jeffrey Donaldson ♭	Ulster Unionist Party
South Down	Frank Feely	Social Democratic and Labour Party
South Down	George Graham	Democratic Unionist Party
South Down	Eddie McGrady	Social Democratic and Labour Party
South Down	Patrick O'Donoghue	Social Democratic and Labour Party
South Down	Jim Wells	Democratic Unionist Party

== Changes ==
=== By-Elections ===
Date	Constituency	Outgoing Member	Party	New Member	Party	Reason
20 April 1983	Armagh	Seamus Mallon	SDLP	Jim Speers	UUP	Seamus Mallon disqualified due to his membership of Seanad Éireann.
1 March 1984	Belfast South	Edgar Graham	UUP	Frank Millar Jr	UUP	Edgar Graham was murdered by the Provisional IRA.
17 October 1985	South Down	Raymond McCullough	UUP	Jeffrey Donaldson	UUP	Raymond McCullough died.

== Subsequent changes of party or allegiance ==
A considerable number of MPAs, mainly Unionist, subsequently left or were expelled from their respective parties. Of UUP members, Jeffrey Donaldson joined the DUP in 2004 after a short spell as an Independent Unionist. Agnew became an Independent Unionist. Bleakes joined the Conservatives but later became an Independent Unionist, while Dunlop took the opposite route, moving to Independent Unionist and then Conservative. McCartney stood as a Real Unionist in 1987 before forming the United Kingdom Unionists in 1995, where he was joined by Vitty who joined from the DUP. Kirkpatrick joined the DUP, rejoined the UUP before again switching to the DUP.

Of DUP members, Allister, Beattie, Calvert, Foster, Graham, Kane and McKee all later quit the party. Seawright (who was expelled from the DUP) Beattie and Graham were subsequently re-elected under different 'Protestant' or 'Protestant Unionist' labels. Davis and Thompson subsequently joined the UUP. In the case of the latter, this was after a spell as an Independent Unionist and he later quit the UUP to rejoin the DUP.

O'Hare quit the SDLP in January 1986 over the party's support for the Anglo-Irish Agreement. Sorley left the SDLP in the late 80s following a row over her acceptance of the M.B.E. and was re-elected to Magherafelt council in 1989 as an Independent.

Currie of the S.D.L.P. and Cushnahan of Alliance later became involved in Southern Irish politics and were elected for Fine Gael.

== Representation of women ==
Of all the members, the three women were: Dorothy Dunlop, Mary McSorley, Mary Simpson.

== Bibliography ==
- Northern Ireland Elections: Northern Ireland Assembly Elections 1982
