= Charles Mulholland, 4th Baron Dunleath =

The Right Honourable The 4th Baron Dunleath

Member of the House of Lords
- In office 1956–1993

Member of the Northern Ireland Constitutional Convention for North Down
- In office 1975–1976
- Preceded by: Convention founded
- Succeeded by: Convention dissolved

Member of the Northern Ireland Assembly for North Down
- In office 28 June 1973 – 28 May 1974
- Preceded by: Assembly established
- Succeeded by: Assembly abolished
- In office 20 October 1982 – 23 June 1986
- Preceded by: Assembly established
- Succeeded by: Assembly abolished

Personal details
- Born: 23 June 1933 London, England
- Died: 9 January 1993 (aged 59) Ballywalter Park, County Down, Northern Ireland
- Party: UUP (until 1973); Alliance (1973–79; since 1981); Independent (1979–81)
- Other political affiliations: Crossbencher (since 1979)

Lieutenant-Colonel Charles Edward Henry John Mulholland, 4th Baron Dunleath, DL (23 June 1933 – 9 January 1993) was a Northern Irish politician and Territorial Army officer.

== Early and personal life ==
Mulholland attended Eton College and Trinity College, Cambridge, where he studied agriculture. He was married to Dorinda (15 February 1929 – 19 March 2022), only daughter of Lieutenant-General Arthur Percival, on 5 December 1959.

== Career ==
Mulholland succeeded as Baron Dunleath in 1956 and entered the House of Lords. As Lord Dunleath, he became a deputy lieutenant of County Down and the commanding officer (lieutenant-colonel) of the North Irish Horse in the Territorial Army. He was also interested in vintage motoring. In August 1967, he was appointed to the BBC's board of governors, taking over from Richard Pim as governor for Northern Ireland.

In the early 1970s, Dunleath was active in the Ulster Defence Regiment and was an Ulster Unionist Party (UUP) member. However, he joined the Alliance Party of Northern Ireland, and was elected for the party in North Down at the 1973 Northern Ireland Assembly election. He held the seat on the Northern Ireland Constitutional Convention.

Dunleath was the only Alliance Party member in the House of Lords. While there, he strongly promoted the Education (Northern Ireland) Act, 1978, which permitted representatives of the Roman Catholic church to take a role in the Protestant-dominated state school system. He also attempted to introduce a bill to liberalise divorce law in Northern Ireland.

Dunleath was chairman of a company which in 1979 bidded for the Independent Television licence for Northern Ireland. In order to place the bid, he was required to resign from his party affiliation; having been elected to Ards Borough Council in 1977, he thereafter sat as an Independent member and as a crossbencher in the House of Lords. However, in 1981 he rejoined the Alliance Party in a personal capacity, and the following year successfully stood as an Alliance candidate in North Down at the Northern Ireland Assembly election, serving for the entire four years of the revived Assembly's existence as both a representative (MPA) and as the Assistant Speaker.

On Dunleath's death from cancer in 1993, his peerage passed to his first cousin Michael Mulholland.

== See also ==
- List of Northern Ireland Members of the House of Lords

Northern Ireland Assembly (1973)
New assembly	Assembly Member for North Down; 1973–1974	Assembly abolished
Northern Ireland Constitutional Convention
New convention	Member for North Down; 1975–1976	Convention dissolved
Northern Ireland Assembly (1982)
New assembly	MPA for North Down; 1982–1986	Assembly abolished
Peerage of the United Kingdom
Preceded by Charles Mulholland	Baron Dunleath; 1956–1993	Succeeded by Michael Mulholland
