= Jeremy Burchill =

Northern Irish politician and lawyer (born 1952)

Member of Belfast City Council
- In office 20 May 1981 – 15 May 1985
- Preceded by: Denis Loretto
- Succeeded by: District abolished
- Constituency: Belfast Area A

Member of the Northern Ireland Assembly for East Belfast
- In office 20 October 1982 – 1986

Member of the Northern Ireland Constitutional Convention for South Belfast
- In office 1975–1976

Personal details
- Born: 1952 (age 72–73); Belfast, Northern Ireland
- Political party: Ulster Unionist

Jeremy Burchill (born 1952) is a former Northern Irish unionist politician and barrister.

== Background ==
Burchill studied at Campbell College and Queen's University, Belfast, then became chair of the Ulster Young Unionist Council. He contested the Northern Ireland Constitutional Convention election in Belfast South in 1975, and was elected for the Ulster Unionist Party, becoming the youngest member of the convention. At the 1979 UK general election, he stood in North Antrim, taking second place, with 23.4% of the vote.

Burchill was elected to Belfast City Council, representing Area A, in 1981. He was also elected in the 1982 Northern Ireland Assembly election, taking a seat in Belfast East. He stood in the equivalent seat at the 1983 UK general election, taking 24.8% of the vote.

Outside politics, Burchill was a member of both the Northern Ireland and English Bar, but had more recently worked as a consultant to financial service companies.

Northern Ireland Constitutional Convention
New convention	Member for South Belfast; 1975–1976	Convention dissolved
Northern Ireland Assembly (1982)
New assembly	MPA for East Belfast; 1982–1986	Assembly abolished
