= Raymond McCrea =

Politician from Northern Ireland (born 1945)

Leader of the Democratic Unionist Party on Belfast City Council
- In office 1981–1985

Member of Belfast City Council
- In office 18 May 1977 – 15 May 1985
- Preceded by: Erskine Holmes
- Succeeded by: District abolished
- Constituency: Belfast Area A

Member of the Northern Ireland Assembly for Belfast South
- In office 20 October 1982 – 1986
- Preceded by: Assembly reconvened
- Succeeded by: Assembly dissolved

Personal details
- Born: 1945 (age 79–80); Belfast, Northern Ireland
- Political party: Democratic Unionist Party

Raymond Stuart McCrea (born 1945) is a former Northern Irish unionist politician who was leader of the Democratic Unionist Party (DUP) on Belfast City Council from 1981 to 1985, as well as a Belfast City Councillor for Belfast Area A from 1977 to 1985.

== Political career ==
McCrea was elected to Belfast City Council in 1977 and sat on the body until 1985, serving as leader of the DUP council group in 1981. He was elected to the Northern Ireland Assembly at the 1982 election to represent South Belfast, serving as a member of the Environment, Health and Social Services committees. At the 1983 general election McCrea was DUP candidate for South Belfast although he finished in third place.

Northern Ireland Assembly (1982)
New assembly	MPA for South Belfast; 1982–1986	Assembly abolished
