= Wesley Pentland =

Northern Ireland politician

Member of the Legislative Assembly for North Down
- In office 1982–1986
- Preceded by: New Assembly
- Succeeded by: Assembly abolished

Personal details
- Born: 1929
- Died: 23 September 2007 (aged 77–78)
- Party: DUP

Wesley Pentland (1929 – 23 September 2007) was an Irish travel industry executive and unionist politician in Northern Ireland.

== Career ==
Pentland began his career at Portadown railway station, then owned and managed a series of travel agencies, in Belfast. He became President of ABTA (the Association of British Travel Agents) and Chairman of the Institute of Travel and Tourism in the 1980s.

Pentland was a regular preacher for the Salvation Army for more than fifty years. He was also active in the Democratic Unionist Party, and was elected to the Northern Ireland Assembly, 1982, from North Down.

Northern Ireland Assembly (1982)
New assembly	MPA for North Down; 1982–1986	Assembly abolished
