= Ivan Foster =

Northern Irish politician (born 1943)

The Rev. Ivan Foster

Personal life
- Born: 1943 (age 82–83) County Fermanagh, Northern Ireland

Religious life
- Religion: Free Presbyterian
- Church: Bethel Free Presbyterian Church (1968 - 1978); Kilskeery Free Presbyterian Church (1978 - date)

Senior posting
- Period in office: 1967 - date

Ivan Foster (born 1943) is a retired senior minister in the Free Presbyterian Church of Ulster and a former Democratic Unionist Party politician. He was a lifelong friend and associate of the Democratic Unionist politician and Free Presbyterian Church leader Ian Paisley, who along with Foster and Peter Robinson, co-founded the organisation Ulster Resistance in 1986 with the aim of importing arms to support loyalist paramilitarism during "the troubles", but in November 2006 he became the most prominent Free Presbyterian to openly challenge Ian Paisley's decision to enter into a power-sharing government with Sinn Féin and went on to denounce Ian Paisley from the pulpit of his church in January 2007.

== Early life ==
Foster was born into an old County Fermanagh Protestant family which had a strong tradition in the Orange Order. Although he had a Pentecostal uncle, Foster's immediate family was not particularly religious and in his youth he had little interest in any sort of Protestantism. Foster found employment with Ulster Television as a trainee film editor and enjoyed a somewhat raucous private life before turning to religion. However, once he heard Ian Paisley, whom Foster refers to as "the Big Man", speaking he immediately became a devoted follower of both his religious and political views. Foster promptly entered training for a ministerial life in the Free Presbyterian Church.

== Minister of Religion ==
Foster was ordained a minister of the Free Presbyterian Church of Ulster in 1968. His first pastoral charge was as minister of Lisbellaw (later called Bethel) Free Presbyterian Church in April 1968. Since 1978, he has served as minister of Kilskeery Free Presbyterian Church, Old Junction Road, Kilskeery, County Tyrone, Northern Ireland. His weekly sermons are broadcast in parts of Northern Ireland and the Republic of Ireland on Christian and community radio stations, including Community Radio 102.9 FM (County Mayo), Radio Star Country, 981 AM (County Monaghan) and Radio North Country, 846 AM (County Donegal).

Since March 1970, he has edited The Burning Bush, a magazine describing itself as 'a Protestant witness in a time of Apostasy', which began life as a congregational newsletter. This magazine is not an official publication of the Free Presbyterian Church. Originally distributed free of charge, a subscription fee was set in 1999. Foster also operates a Christian fundamentalist website. He has also undertaken evangelical missions in Canada and was for many years the head of the Free Presbyterian Education Board. Foster and his wife pioneered Christian education in Ulster, setting up a congregational school in Kilskeery and supporting many other Christian education endeavors, not only in Ulster but further afield.

Foster has also gained a reputation as an outspoken critic. He has denounced the Belfast-born Christian writer and apologist C.S. Lewis as an 'apostate'. He is also outspokenly in favour of corporal punishment and in 2001, in response to a public debate about the British Government's plans to ban corporal punishment in the home, he condemned the NSPCC as having a part in an 'evil' plan to abolish it. Foster retired from the ministry of Kilskeery Free Presbyterian Church in November 2008. He remains active as a minister in his retirement.

As a minister during the Troubles, Foster was involved in the funerals of a number of loyalists. He also conducted the funeral of Larne UVF man Sinclair Johnston in 1972, although in this case Foster and Johnston were related.

== DUP Politician ==
Foster first became active in politics in 1964 when, along with fellow student minister William Beattie, he campaigned in support of Ulster Protestant Action members seeking election to Belfast Corporation. He became a close associate of Paisley, who at the time utilised provocative street demonstrations targeting both Catholic areas and mainstream Protestant denominations, and was arrested and briefly held in Crumlin Road Gaol in 1966 for public order offences.

Foster was a member of the DUP during the 1980s being a member of Omagh District Council and winning a seat in the Northern Ireland assembly elections of 1982 for the Fermanagh and South Tyrone constituency.

Foster was the commander of the Fermanagh battalion of Paisley's vigilante group, the Third Force, one of the few regions of the group that undertook any real activity. Along with George Graham and other DUP supporters, Foster was arrested in summer 1985 after an unsuccessful attempt to smash police lines preventing a loyalist band from marching in Castlewellan, an event to which Foster had publicly threatened to bring Third Force members. He gained his greatest notoriety in 1986 when he was one of the three founders of Ulster Resistance.

Subsequently, Foster abandoned political life to concentrate on his work as a Free Presbyterian minister, having decided that the policies of the DUP were becoming too liberal. He formally announced his resignation from the party in 1989, adding particular criticism of the close relationship between Paisley and Ulster Unionist Party leader Jim Molyneaux, which Foster felt was compromising DUP independence.

== Criticism of the DUP ==
Whilst continuing in his ministry the politically retired Foster would emerge from time to time as a critic of the DUP that he had left. In 2002 he preached a sermon in which he condemned Nigel Dodds who accepted an invitation to attend an ecumenical service at St Anne's Cathedral, Belfast, in celebration of Elizabeth II's golden jubilee. Foster accused Dodds of disobeying God's words by attending the service, arguing that it was a wicked ceremony as it was addressed by Seán Cardinal Brady, Catholic Primate of All Ireland and Archbishop of Armagh, whom Foster accused of being a priest of the Antichrist.

He subsequently became outspoken in the political path taken by Ian Paisley. This began on Thursday 23 November 2006, when Foster gave interviews to the media and met with Ian Paisley in person to express his concerns that the DUP were considering forming a power-sharing government in Northern Ireland, under the terms of the St Andrews Agreement. Foster's condemnation grew stronger on Sunday 7 January 2007 when, in a sermon lasting 70 minutes, Foster denounced Dr. Paisley because of his apparent willingness to enter into a coalition government with Sinn Féin. In the sermon, (entitled Where have we gone astray? -- A Question for Free Presbyterians) which was also webcast, Foster said, "We do pray for Dr. Paisley and I never thought I would see the day that I would stand in this pulpit and say I think him wrong entirely and say I could never support what he is doing, but that day has come."

Northern Ireland Assembly (1982)
New assembly	MPA for Fermanagh and South Tyrone; 1982–1986	Assembly abolished
