= Edgar Graham =

Northern Ireland unionist politician (1954–1983)

Edgar Graham, MPA

Member of the Northern Ireland Assembly
- In office 20 October 1982 – 7 December 1983
- Preceded by: Seat created
- Succeeded by: Frank Millar Jr
- Constituency: South Belfast

Personal details
- Born: 24 February 1954 Northern Ireland
- Died: 7 December 1983 (aged 29) Belfast, Northern Ireland
- Party: Ulster Unionist Party
- Education: Queen's University Belfast; Trinity College, Oxford
- Profession: Barrister; Academic

Edgar Samuel David Graham, MPA, BL (24 February 1954 – 7 December 1983) was an Ulster Unionist Party (UUP) politician and academic from Northern Ireland. He was regarded as a rising star of both legal studies and Unionism and a possible future leader of the UUP. Graham was shot dead on 7 December 1983 by the Provisional Irish Republican Army (IRA) close to the main library at Queen's University Belfast, where he lectured in law.

== Career ==
Graham graduated from Queen's University in 1976. He began working on a doctorate at Trinity College, Oxford, and was called to the Bar of Northern Ireland. In 1979 he became a member of Queen's law faculty, lecturing in public law, and was a law faculty colleague of David Trimble and Dermot Nesbitt.

After becoming chair of the Ulster Young Unionist Council, Graham subsequently became active in the UUP. In 1982 he addressed the Conservative Party conference on the subject of Northern Ireland and he attended the Harvard Summer School for leading young lawyers. He was critical of both the British government's perceived indecisiveness and the UUP leadership under James Molyneaux.

Graham advocated devolution for Northern Ireland, rather than closer integration with the rest of the United Kingdom. However, he firmly rejected power-sharing with nationalists, including the Social Democratic and Labour Party (SDLP). In a speech given at the annual meeting of the Randalstown UUP branch in November 1980, Graham reasserted the "Unionist resolve not to share power" with the SDLP. In February 1982, after Secretary of State Jim Prior unveiled his proposals for a new assembly, Graham noted that unionists would not accept the SDLP in a cabinet position and claimed that the SDLP could not be trusted with the responsibility of devolved government. One month later, Graham dismissed a power-sharing government with nationalists in Northern Ireland as an "impossibility" and explained:

Unionists do not and never have objected to sharing power with Roman Catholics who are prepared to accept the Union. But they will not share power with Republicans like the SDLP under the present leadership.

Graham was a vocal critic of the continued existence of separate Catholic maintained sector schools in Northern Ireland, claiming in 1982 that it was particularly "preposterous" since Catholic schools "inculcate their own views of history and their own political ideals and objectives."

Graham was elected a member of the 1982 Northern Ireland Assembly for South Belfast and was appointed chair of the Assembly's finance committee. In August 1983 Graham claimed that the generous funds were directed at predominantly nationalist areas of West Belfast such as Poleglass at the expense of adjoining loyalist estates. He alleged that the loyalist Areema estate in Dunmurry was denied a central heating system because of the "vast proportion of public funds being sunk into West Belfast." He called for the British government to prioritise funding for areas where appreciative and "law-abiding" people lived rather than spending money "hand over fist, in areas which clearly do not appreciate it." That same month Graham called for the defunding of cross-border body Co-operation North, stating that British government funds should not be used to support organisations aiming to foster better north–south relations. He was quoted as saying "We have heard too much of initiatives with all-Ireland perspectives."

== Death ==
In mid-morning on 7 December 1983, while chatting to Nesbitt at the University Square side of the main campus library, he was shot in the head a number of times by an IRA gunman and died almost instantly. The gunman and an accomplice, described as being dressed casually like students, ran off past the School of Music building. Graham was 29 years old. Two persons were later convicted of withholding evidence from the police, but no one was ever convicted for his murder.

In a communique taking responsibility for the killing, the IRA command said his killing "should be a salutary lesson to those loyalists who stand foursquare behind the laws and forces of oppression of the nationalist people." IRA members said that Graham was targeted because of aid and advice he had reportedly given to the Northern Ireland Prison Service. Graham had also gained attention for his strong arguments publicly supporting internment, the revocation of Special Category Status for republican prisoners, and the British government's network of informers. He had made an appearance on BBC Northern Ireland criticising the Thatcher government for not taking a hard enough line during the 1981 Hunger Strike.

Former IRA member turned police informer Sean O'Callaghan suggested that the IRA had killed Graham because he was regarded by a journalist as "potentially the most effective political opponent facing Sinn Féin that the Ulster Unionists had yet produced" and likely to become the party leader.

After Graham's killing, an expression of sympathy was made by James Dooge in Seanad Éireann, the Republic of Ireland's upper house of parliament:

I would like the Seanad to note with horror and dismay the death of the Assemblyman, Edgar Graham, who was murdered outside Queen's University, Belfast, this morning. It has been said by a noted writer that in the death of every man each of us dies a little. I think this is horribly true for us here in Ireland today that for every one of these victims of violence not only do we die a little but our hopes for our country die a little with every one of these outrages.

The resultant Assembly by-election on 1 March 1984 was won unopposed by then Ulster Unionist Party Chief Executive Frank Millar Jr.

The UUP leader, James Molyneaux, remarked:

Had Mr Graham not been murdered he would have become the leader of our party, such was his calibre.

In honour and remembrance to Edgar Graham there is an inscription at the entrance of the debating hall at Stormont that reads:

IN MEMORY OF EDGAR SAMUEL DAVID GRAHAM ASSEMBLY MEMBER FOR BELFAST SOUTH 1982–1983. SHOT BY TERRORISTS ON 7 DECEMBER 1983. "KEEP ALIVE THE LIGHT OF JUSTICE".

Sylvia, Lady Hermon, who was then a lawyer, was in the students' union at the time news of the murder broke and spoke of her revulsion at hearing students cheering. She vowed never to set foot in the union again. Students' Union President Peter O'Neill, who was in his office in the building when news of the murder was given to him by a student within minutes, states that he heard no cheering and that news of the death of Mr Graham was not communicated through the union's Tannoy system.

== Repercussions ==
David Trimble invoked his friend's killing to contend both that the Unionist community had suffered greatly at the hands of republicans and that more moderate Unionists were willing to take bold moves (especially support for the Good Friday Agreement) and were willing to put their suffering behind them. Graham's sister, Anne Graham, has criticised Sinn Féin for refusing to condemn her brother's murder. In 2018 she confronted Sinn Féin vice president Michelle O'Neill at a public meeting at Queen’s University.

Graham's long-term girlfriend, Pauline Gilmore, was active in the Ulster Young Unionists and grieved openly at his funeral. Gilmore later came to prominence as a loyalist campaigner during contentious Orange Order marches in the 1990s. In July 1998, Gilmore, then aged 32, was arrested for possession of explosives and ammunition at Drumcree but was later acquitted.

Journalist Ed Moloney, in his book, A Secret History of the IRA (2003), contends that Graham's killing was ordered by a restive IRA unit, the Belfast Brigade and Ivor Bell, as part of a campaign that was a direct challenge to Sinn Féin leader Gerry Adams' call for a more "controlled and disciplined" campaign twinned with a growing parliamentary strategy. Moloney argues that Belfast area attacks by the IRA in late 1983, because of their backlash in the middle classes of both communities, in fact strengthened Adams and Sinn Féin's political path.

Despite Graham's murder, violence in Northern Ireland actually continued in a pattern of decline in 1983, with 77 deaths, down from 97 the previous year. The British Army suffered only five deaths in 1983, its lowest number since 1971, while combined security services suffered 33 deaths (a drop from 40 the year before), and civilian deaths were recorded as 44, the lowest number since 1970.

== Bibliography ==
- Bell, J. Bowyer (1997). The Secret Army: The IRA (3rd ed.). Transaction. ISBN 978-1-56000-901-6.
- Coogan, Tim Pat (2002). The IRA. Palgrave. p. 553. ISBN 978-0-312-29416-8.
- Hourican, Bridget; Dudley Edwards, Ruth (2005). An Atlas of Irish History. Routledge. p. 264. ISBN 978-0-415-33952-0.
- Jackson, Alan A. (1999). Ireland, 1798–1998. Blackwell. ISBN 978-0-631-19542-9.
- McBride, Ian (2011). "The Shadow of the gunman: Irish historians and the IRA". Journal of Contemporary History. 46 (3): 686–710. doi:10.1177/0022009411403343. S2CID 145450228.
- Waller, Robert; Criddle, Byron (2002). Almanac of British Politics. Routledge. p. 313. ISBN 978-0-415-26834-9.

Northern Ireland Assembly (1982)
New assembly	MPA for Belfast South; 1982–1983	Succeeded by Frank Millar Jr
