= Dominican College, Fortwilliam =

Coordinates: 54.630°N 5.932°W

Location
- 38 Fortwilliam Park; Belfast, County Antrim, BT15 4AQ; Northern Ireland

Information
- Type: Grammar School
- Motto: Veritas (Truth)
- Religious affiliation: Roman Catholic
- Established: 1930
- Board: Education Authority (Belfast)
- Principal: Lynda Catney
- Gender: All female
- Enrolment: 1000 (approx)
- Colour
- Website: www.dominicancollege.org.uk

Dominican College is a Catholic grammar all-girls school in Fortwilliam Park, north Belfast, Northern Ireland.

== History ==
The school was established in 1930 by the Dominican Sisters. It was initially established as a Catholic commercial college for Belfast, alongside a second-level school. In 2006, the management of the school passed from the Dominican Sisters to lay management. The school is now under the trusteeship of the Cabra Dominican Sisters, with a board of governors whose membership also includes parents, a teacher and appointees of the Education Authority.

In 2005 it underwent a major £13.1 million redevelopment.

The school chapel has been listed as a building of special architectural merit.

In 2017, the total student population was just over 1000, a quarter of it the sixth form.

== Academics ==
In 2019 the school was ranked 5th out of 159 secondary schools in Northern Ireland with 91.7% of its A-level students who sat the exams in 2017/18 being awarded three A*-C grades.

In 2018 it was ranked joint ninth in Northern Ireland for its GCSE performance with 99.3% of its entrants receiving five or more GCSEs at grades A* to C, including the core subjects English and Maths.

== Facilities ==
The modernist design of the chapel, which was built in 1964, was influenced by Le Corbusier's chapel at Ronchamp in France.

== Alumnae ==
- Eileen Bell CBE (born 1943) – politician, Northern Ireland Assembly (MLA) for North Down from 1998 to 2007
- Marianne Elliott OBE (born 1948) – academic historian.
- Medbh McGuckian (born 1950) – poet
- Katie Melua (born 1984) – Georgian-born popular singer
- Nuala McAllister (born 1989) – politician; Northern Ireland Assembly (MLA) for North Belfast from 2022

== See also ==
- Dominicans in Ireland
- List of secondary schools in Belfast
- List of Grammar schools in Northern Ireland
