= Eileen Bell =

Northern Irish politician

Eileen Bell CBE
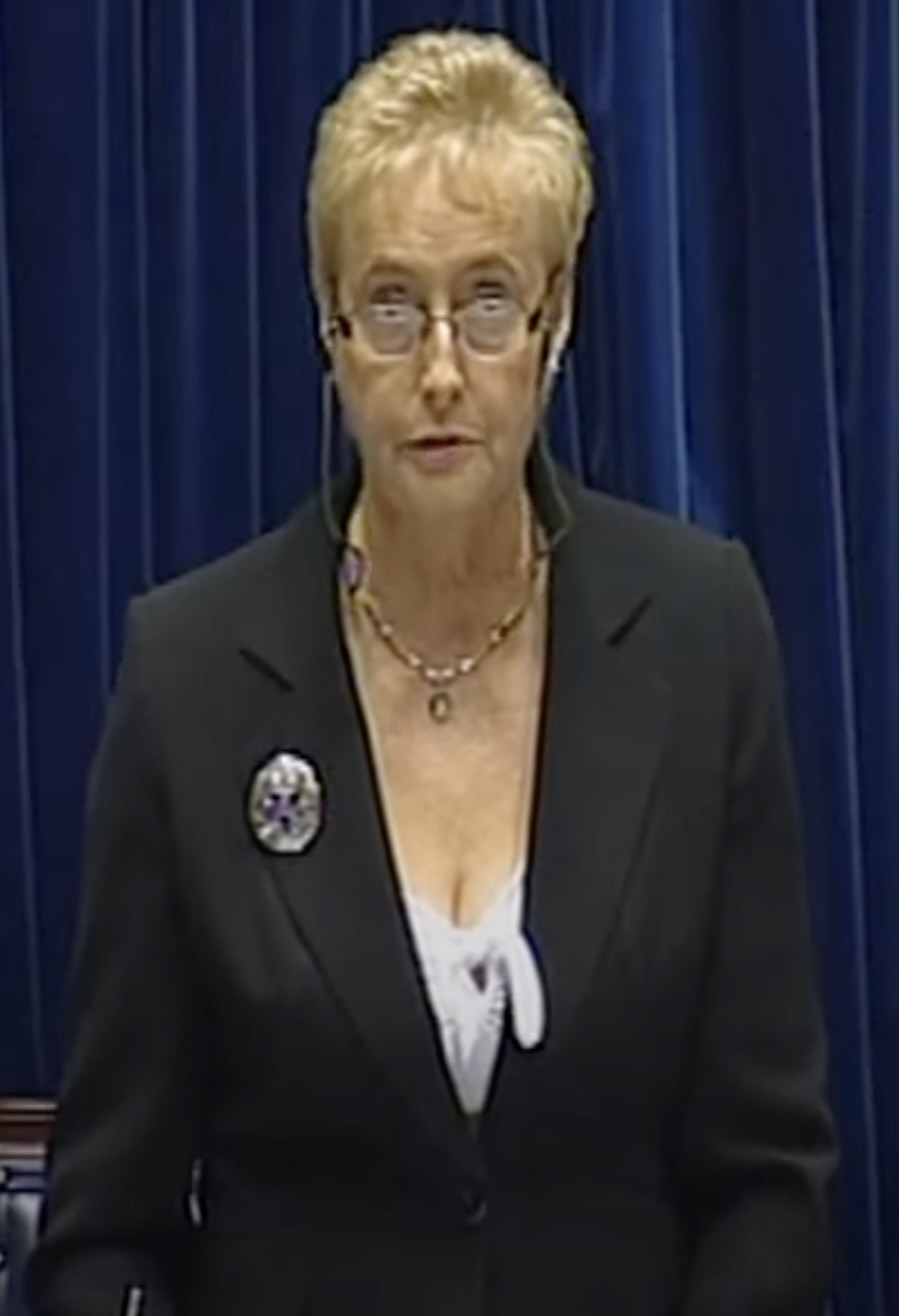
- Bell in 2007

Speaker of the Northern Ireland Assembly
- Interim; 8 May 2007
- Deputy: Francie Molloy; David McClarty; John Dallat
- Preceded by: Herself
- Succeeded by: William Hay
- In office 9 May 2006 – 30 January 2007
- Preceded by: John Alderdice
- Succeeded by: Herself

Deputy Leader of the Alliance Party
- In office 2001–2006
- Leader: Sean Neeson; David Ford
- Preceded by: Seamus Close
- Succeeded by: Naomi Long

Member of the Northern Ireland Assembly for North Down
- In office 25 June 1998 – 7 March 2007
- Preceded by: New Creation
- Succeeded by: Stephen Farry

Member of North Down Borough Council
- In office 19 May 1993 – 7 June 2001
- Preceded by: James O'Fee
- Succeeded by: Tony Hill
- Constituency: Bangor West

Member of the Northern Ireland Forum
- In office 30 May 1996 – 25 April 1998
- Preceded by: Forum created
- Succeeded by: Forum dissolved
- Constituency: Top-up list

Personal details
- Born: 15 August 1943 (age 83) Dromara, Northern Ireland
- Party: Alliance
- Education: University of Ulster
- Occupation: Public servant, politician

Eileen Bell CBE (born 15 August 1943) is a retired Alliance Party politician from Dromara, Northern Ireland. She was a member of the Northern Ireland Assembly (MLA) for North Down from 1998 to 2007, and is a former deputy leader of the Alliance Party.

== Early life ==
Bell was born in Dromara and grew up in West Belfast. She was educated at the Dominican College, Belfast and the University of Ulster. She held a number of jobs including working in the Civil Service and later as Welfare Officer for the Community of the Peace People.

== Political career ==
In 1986, she became General Secretary of the Alliance Party. Later, in 1993, she won the election to North Down Borough Council. She was later elected as one of two "top-up" members of the 1996 Northern Ireland Peace Forum and in the 1998 Northern Ireland Assembly elections she won a seat in North Down.

In June 2001, Bell was appointed Deputy Leader of the Alliance by Seán Neeson, following the resignation of Seamus Close over disagreements on the party's direction. However, Neeson himself soon resigned and Bell stood for the leadership as a traditionalist bridge-building candidate, against David Ford who was on the more consciously Liberal, internationalist wing of the party. At the Party's council Bell received 45 votes to Ford's 86 and she remained as the party's deputy leader. In the 2003 Assembly elections she retained her seat.

On 10 December 2005, it was announced that Bell would stand down as Deputy Leader of the party and not contest the next Assembly elections.

Bell acted as the Speaker of the Assembly established by the Northern Ireland Act 2006 and of the Transitional Assembly established by the Northern Ireland (St Andrews Agreement) Act 2006. On 8 May 2007, she was appointed Speaker of the Northern Ireland Assembly (which had been suspended since 2002) only to be replaced that same day by William Hay.

== Post Political career ==
After leaving political life Eileen Bell turned to a charity she had long supported and became vice president and Legislative Advisor to Autism NI. She has been one of the driving forces behind a Lobby for an Autism Bill in Northern Ireland. She was also the chairperson of Downtown Women's Group which managed the Women into Politics Project. She stayed on as a board member of the group until it wound down in 2015.

== Honours ==
She was appointed Commander of the Order of the British Empire (CBE) in the 2008 New Year Honours.

Party political offices
| Preceded by ? | General Secretary of the Alliance Party of Northern Ireland; 1986–1990 | Succeeded by David Ford |
| Preceded by Seamus Close | Deputy Leader of the Alliance Party of Northern Ireland; 2001–2006 | Succeeded by Naomi Long |
Northern Ireland Forum
| New forum | Regional Member; 1996–1998 | Forum dissolved |
Northern Ireland Assembly
| New assembly | MLA for North Down; 1998–2007 | Succeeded by Stephen Farry |
Political offices
| Preceded by John Alderdice | Speaker of the Northern Ireland Assembly; 2007 | Succeeded by William Hay |
