= Northern Ireland Assembly (disambiguation) =

The Northern Ireland Assembly is the current devolved legislature of Northern Ireland.

Northern Ireland Assembly may also refer to:

- Northern Ireland Assembly (1973), a legislature set up in 1973 to replace the Parliament of Northern Ireland
- Northern Ireland Assembly (1982), a legislature set up in 1982 to attempt to achieve power-sharing government in Northern Ireland
