= Frank Millar Jr =

Northern Irish journalist and unionist politician

Member of the Northern Ireland Assembly for Belfast South
- In office 1984–1986
- Preceded by: Edgar Graham
- Succeeded by: Assembly abolished

Personal details
- Born: Belfast, Northern Ireland
- Political party: Ulster Unionist

Frank Millar (born September 1954) is a Northern Irish journalist and former unionist politician.

== Background ==
The son of Frank Millar, also a unionist politician, he was known as "Frank Millar Jr" during his early political career. He joined the Ulster Unionist Party (UUP), and remained a member when his father left the organisation to sit as an independent Unionist.

Millar was the Press Officer of the UUP during the early 1980s. He stood unsuccessfully for 1982 Northern Ireland Assembly in South Antrim. However, he was elected to that body in 1984 in an uncontested by-election in Belfast South caused by the IRA murder of Edgar Graham.

In 1983, Millar became the General Secretary of the UUP. At the 1987 UK general election, he stood in Belfast West, receiving 18.7% of the votes cast. The same year, he worked with UUP MP Harold McCusker and the DUP's Peter Robinson to produce a report on power sharing, following a positive report on the topic by the Ulster Political Research Group. The Task Force Report gave serious consideration to the idea, and called for a strategic unionist rethink in the wake of the Anglo-Irish Agreement. It was rejected by their respective leaders, Ian Paisley and James Molyneaux. Millar then resigned from his party post.

Millar subsequently became a journalist and has long been the London Editor of the Irish Times. In 1998, he was named the Irish Print Journalist of the Year. In 2004, he wrote a biography of UUP leader David Trimble, entitled David Trimble: The Price of Peace.

Northern Ireland Assembly (1982)
Preceded by Edgar Graham	MPA for South Belfast; 1983–1986	Assembly abolished
Political offices
Preceded by Norman Hutton	General Secretary of the Ulster Unionist Party; 1983–1987	Succeeded by Jim Wilson
