= Belfast Area A =

Electoral division in Belfast, Northern Ireland

Area A was one of the eight district electoral areas (DEA) which existed in Belfast, Northern Ireland from 1973 to 1985. Located in the south-east of the city, the district elected seven members to Belfast City Council and contained the wards of Ballymacarrett; Ballynafeigh; Orangefield; Ormeau; Rosetta; The Mount and Willowfield. The DEA formed part of the Belfast South and Belfast East constituencies.

== History ==
The area was created for the 1973 local government elections, combining the whole of the former Ormeau ward with most of the former Pottinger ward. It was abolished for the 1985 local government elections. The Rosetta and Ballynafeigh wards became part of a new Laganbank DEA, while the remaining five wards joined the Bloomfield ward, formerly part of Area B, in the new Pottinger DEA.

== Councillors ==
Election	Councillor (Party)	Councillor (Party)	Councillor (Party)	Councillor (Party)	Councillor (Party)	Councillor (Party)	Councillor (Party)
1981	Donnell Deeny (Alliance)	Grace Bannister (UUP)	William Blair (UUP)	Jeremy Burchill (UUP)	Sammy Wilson (DUP)	John Foster (DUP)	Raymond McCrea (DUP)
1977	Basil Glass (Alliance)	Grace Bannister (UUP)	William Blair (UUP)	Denis Loretto (Alliance)	Alasdair McDonnell (SDLP)	Robert Newman (DUP)	Raymond McCrea (DUP)
1973	Patricia Carson (Alliance)	Grace Bannister (UUP)	William Blair (UUP)	Benjamin Horan (UUP)	Thomas Gildea (UUP)	William Elliott (Vanguard)	Erskine Holmes (NILP)

== 1981 Election ==
1977: 2 x UUP, 2 x DUP, 2 x Alliance, 1 x SDLP

1981: 3 x DUP, 3 x UUP, 1 x Alliance

1977-1981 Change: DUP and UUP gain from Alliance and SDLP

Area A - 7 seats
Party	Candidate	FPv%	Count														
Party	Candidate	FPv%	1	2	3	4	5	6	7	8	9	10	11	12	13	14	15
DUP	John Foster	18.32%	3,333														
UUP	Jeremy Burchill	14.23%	2,589														
DUP	Raymond McCrea*	12.87%	2,342														
DUP	Sammy Wilson	8.13%	1,479	2,431.64													
UUP	Grace Bannister*	11.29%	2,055	2,081.88	2,202	2,265	2,285.64										
Alliance	Donnell Deeny	7.91%	1,439	1,440.92	1,447.52	1,449.41	1,450.05	1,460.09	1,464.57	1,477.81	1,553.17	1,560.49	1,645.85	1,657.44	2,463.44		
UUP	William Blair*	4.95%	900	918.56	1,024.64	1,054.7	1,067.14	1,072.27	1,101.76	1,211.3	1,250.36	1,250.36	1,258.63	1,742.86	1,793.34	1,936.94	1,944.62
SDLP	Alasdair McDonnell*	6.94%	1,262	1,263.6	1,263.84	1,264.02	1,264.34	1,272.66	1,272.66	1,273.66	1,291.66	1,660.75	1,856.1	1,856.27	1,889.76	1,932.16	1,932.16
Alliance	Mervyn Jones	4.21%	766	771.44	770.16	779.69	781.21	787.21	791.6	808.62	907.05	913.05	964.37	984.13			
UUP	Tony Wilkins	2.99%	544	569.28	611.76	634.26	645.94	650.19	669.27	721.95	733.24	734.24	736.33				
Republican Clubs	Francis Cullen	2.30%	418	419.28	419.52	419.88	419.88	445.01	446.33	446.76	467.3	483.3					
SDLP	Patrick McGourty	2.25%	410	410.64	410.76	410.85	410.89	412.89	412.89	412.89	419.98						
NI Labour	Derek Peters	1.52%	276	278.24	278.72	279.44	279.8	297.89	306.35	310.55							
UPUP	Benjamin Horan	1.03%	187	196.28	206.12	223.31	228.67	230.67	239.44								
Independent	John McKeague	0.54%	99	103.8	107.88	116.34	120.94	126.26									
Communist	James Stewart	0.25%	97	98.92	99.52	100.15	100.51										
Electorate: 31,215 Valid: 18,196 (58.29%) Spoilt: 937 Quota: 2,275 Turnout: 19,133 (61.29%)

== 1977 Election ==
1973: 4 x UUP, 1 x Alliance, 1 x Vanguard, 1 x NILP

1977: 2 x UUP, 2 x DUP, 2 x Alliance, 1 x SDLP

1973-1977 Change: DUP (two seats), Alliance and SDLP gain from UUP (two seats), Vanguard and NILP

Area A - 7 seats
Party	Candidate	FPv%	Count														
Party	Candidate	FPv%	1	2	3	4	5	6	7	8	9	10	11	12	13	14	15
Alliance	Basil Glass	16.03%	2,580														
UUP	Grace Bannister*	14.70%	2,367														
DUP	Raymond McCrea	11.88%	1,912	1,914.31	1,918.6	1,918.66	1,918.66	1,918.66	1,963.81	2,076.21							
UUP	William Blair*	6.37%	1,026	1,035.66	1,270.56	1,275.07	1,276.07	1,290.28	1,349.33	1,465.68	1,466.9	1,709.49	1,774.11	2,358.11			
DUP	Robert Newman	9.62%	1,549	1,549.63	1,552.33	1,552.33	1,554.33	1,601.78	1,618.78	1,631.23	1,682.47	1,708.38	1,724.38	1,764.02	1,798.02	2,368.02	
Alliance	Denis Loretto	4.14%	667	1,109.47	1,115.17	1,130.01	1,152.43	1,156.85	1,168.42	1,174.29	1,174.29	1,187.64	1,542.09	1,602.75	1,649.75	1,711.71	1,723.71
SDLP	Alasdair McDonnell	8.47%	1,364	1,397.6	1,398.2	1,408.56	1,566.55	1,567.55	1,571.55	1,571.55	1,571.55	1,573.55	1,633.23	1,636.23	1,638.23	1,643.44	1,644.44
Unionist Party NI	Thomas Jordan	5.93%	954	970.8	979.5	979.5	981.5	988.65	1,002.88	1,015.48	1,016.7	1,055.08	1,122.16	1,195.53	1,300.53	1,481.48	1,609.48
UUUP	Benjamin Horan*	4.20%	676	679.99	687.79	687.79	687.79	897.24	954.05	960.26	963.92	990.78	1,013.78	1,100.7	1,202.7		
UUP	Thomas Gildea*	3.00%	483	486.78	524.88	527.88	527.88	534.03	573.53	651.89	656.16	936.8	978.4				
NI Labour	Brian Garrett	3.69%	594	610.17	614.37	667.21	697.63	699.84	715.84	719.14	719.14	728.14					
UUP	Walter Shannon	2.81%	452	454.52	475.07	476.07	476.07	480.43	489.03	654.82	656.04						
UUP	Alfred Shaw	2.35%	378	379.89	393.84	396.84	396.84	400.14	409.74								
Ind. Unionist	William Elliott*	2.35%	379	380.05	385.75	387.38	387.38	388.38									
UUUP	Philip Moles	2.14%	345	345.84	347.79	347.79	349										
Republican Clubs	Terence McGrattan	1.73%	278	280.73	280.88	280.88											
NI Labour	Derek Peters	0.58%	93	95.94	96.54												
Electorate: 24,230 Valid: 16,097 (66.43%) Spoilt: 801 Quota: 2,013 Turnout: 16,898 (69.74%)

== 1973 Election ==
1973: 4 x UUP, 1 x Alliance, 1 x Vanguard, 1 x NILP

Area A - 7 seats
Party	Candidate	FPv%	Count															
Party	Candidate	FPv%	1	2	3	4	5	6	7	8	9	10	11	12	13	14	15	16
UUP	Grace Bannister	25.50%	6,328															
UUP	William Blair	6.04%	1,498	3,050	3,050	3,053.5	3,065.5	3,066.5	3,098.5	3,103.5								
UUP	Benjamin Horan	11.15%	2,768	2,958.5	2,959.5	2,959.5	2,982	2,984	3,069.5	3,075.5	3,099	3,176						
UUP	Thomas Gildea	6.44%	1,598	2,079	2,079	2,084.5	2,096.5	2,096.5	2,111	2,122	2,146.5	2,170.5	2,786	2,792	3,714			
Alliance	Patricia Carson	5.30%	1,315	1,373	1,376	1,440	1,440	1,457	1,459	1,675.5	2,398.5	2,410	2,444.5	2,444.5	2,535.5	2,688.5	3,226.5	
Vanguard	William Elliott	5.33%	1,322	1,358.5	1,358.5	1,358.5	1,418.5	1,419.5	1,498	1,500	1,506	1,622	1,698	1,705	1,773.5	1,847.5	1,850.5	3,049
NI Labour	Erskine Holmes	5.39%	1,337	1,378.5	1,421.5	1,431.5	1,437	1,662.5	1,669.5	1,730	1,841	1,856	1,881.5	1,884.5	1,953	2,048	2,860.5	2,901.5
DUP	Thomas Wright	4.67%	1,158	1,176.5	1,177.5	1,177.5	1,209.5	1,212.5	1,269.5	1,271.5	1,273.5	1,860.5	1,889	1,927	2,025	2,184	2,187	2,391.5
United Loyalist	W. Dougherty	4.83%	1,198	1,265	1,265	1,265	1,317	1,317	1,405	1,406	1,414	1,527.5	1,568	1,571	1,619	1,666	1,670	
SDLP	Ben Caraher	5.25%	1,302	1,309.5	1,329.5	1,332.5	1,332.5	1,445	1,446	1,483	1,502.5	1,504	1,509.5	1,510.5	1,512.5	1,512.5		
UUP	John McKeown	4.11%	1,021	1,218.5	1,218.5	1,221.5	1,226.5	1,226.5	1,238	1,240	1,252	1,274	1,463.5	1,476.5				
UUP	Emma Dunbar	2.20%	546	964.5	965.5	967.5	971.5	971.5	996.5	1,001.5	1,020.5	1,056						
DUP	W. G. Greene	3.52%	874	905	907	907	937.5	940.5	1,004.5	1,005.5	1,013.5							
Alliance	Sam Edgerton	2.83%	702	716	720	756	761	780	784	979.5								
Alliance	Bernadette Hopkirk	1.73%	430	435.5	436.5	494.5	497	550	552									
Ind. Unionist	J. Keenan	1.74%	432	443	443	446	479	480										
NI Labour	J. Murray	1.70%	421	422.5	440.5	446.5	450.5											
Ulster Constitution Party	Lindsay Mason	1.09%	271	280	280	281												
Alliance	Jacqueline Maguire	0.77%	192	194	196													
Communist	H. Moore	0.41%	101	101														
Electorate: 38,311 Valid: 24,814 (64.77%) Spoilt: 360 Quota: 3,102 Turnout: 25,174 (65.71%)
