= North Down (Assembly constituency) =

Coordinates: 54°37′53″N 5°40′52″W

- Northern Ireland Assembly; Parliamentary constituency
- North Down shown within Northern Ireland

Current constituency
- Created: 1973
- Seats: 6 (1996–2016); 5 (2017–)
- MLAs: Alan Chambers (UUP); Stephen Dunne (DUP); Connie Egan (APNI); Peter Martin (DUP); Andrew Muir (APNI)
- Districts: Ards and North Down Borough Council

North Down is a constituency in the Northern Ireland Assembly.

The seat was first used for a Northern Ireland-only election for the Northern Ireland Assembly, 1973. It usually shares boundaries with the North Down UK Parliament constituency, however the boundaries of the two constituencies were slightly different from 1983 to 1986 as the Assembly boundaries had not caught up with Parliamentary boundary changes and from 1996 to 1997 when members of the Northern Ireland Forum had been elected from the newly drawn Parliamentary constituencies but the 51st Parliament of the United Kingdom, elected in 1992 under the 1983–95 constituency boundaries, was still in session.

Members were then elected from the constituency to the 1975 Constitutional Convention, the 1982 Assembly, the 1996 Forum and then to the current Assembly from 1998.

For further details of the history and boundaries of the constituency, see North Down (UK Parliament constituency).

== Members ==
Election	MLA (party)	MLA (party)	MLA (party)	MLA (party)	MLA (party)	MLA (party)	MLA (party)	MLA (party)
1973	Lord Dunleath (Alliance Party)	Bertie McConnell (Alliance Party)	Charles Poots (DUP)	Robert Campbell (UUP)	James Kilfedder (UUP/UPUP)	John Brooke (UUP/UPNI)	William Brownlow (UUP)	7 seats 1973–1982
1975	Lord Dunleath (Alliance Party)	Bertie McConnell (Alliance Party)	Charles Poots (DUP)	John Taylor (UUP)	James Kilfedder (UUP/UPUP)	John Brooke (UUP/UPNI)	George Green (Vanguard)	7 seats 1973–1982
1982	Lord Dunleath (Alliance Party)	Robert McCartney (UUP/UKUP)	Simpson Gibson (DUP)	John Taylor (UUP)	James Kilfedder (UUP/UPUP)	William Bleakes (UUP)	Wesley Pentland (DUP)	John Cushnahan (Alliance Party)
1996	Oliver Napier (Alliance Party)	Robert McCartney (UUP/UKUP)	St Clair McAlister (DUP)	Alan McFarland (UUP)	5 seats 1996–1998	Peter Weir (UUP / DUP)	5 seats 1996–1998	
1998	Eileen Bell (Alliance Party)	Robert McCartney (UUP/UKUP)	Jane Morrice (NI Women's Coalition)	Alan McFarland (UUP)	John Gorman (UUP)	Peter Weir (UUP / DUP)	6 seats 1998–2017	
2003	Eileen Bell (Alliance Party)	Robert McCartney (UUP/UKUP)	Alex Easton (DUP / Independent Unionist)	Alan McFarland (UUP)	Leslie Cree (UUP)	Peter Weir (UUP / DUP)	6 seats 1998–2017	
2007	Stephen Farry (Alliance Party)	Brian Wilson (Green (NI))	Alex Easton (DUP / Independent Unionist)	Alan McFarland (UUP)	Leslie Cree (UUP)	Peter Weir (UUP / DUP)	6 seats 1998–2017	
2011	Stephen Farry (Alliance Party)	Steven Agnew (Green (NI))	Alex Easton (DUP / Independent Unionist)	Gordon Dunne (DUP)	Leslie Cree (UUP)	Peter Weir (UUP / DUP)	6 seats 1998–2017	
2016	Stephen Farry (Alliance Party)	Steven Agnew (Green (NI))	Alex Easton (DUP / Independent Unionist)	Gordon Dunne (DUP)	Alan Chambers (UUP)	Peter Weir (UUP / DUP)	6 seats 1998–2017	
2017	Stephen Farry (Alliance Party)	Steven Agnew (Green (NI))	Alex Easton (DUP / Independent Unionist)	Gordon Dunne (DUP)	Alan Chambers (UUP)	5 seats 2017–present		
2019 co-option	Stephen Farry (Alliance Party)	Rachel Woods (Green (NI))	Alex Easton (DUP / Independent Unionist)	Gordon Dunne (DUP)	Alan Chambers (UUP)	5 seats 2017–present		
2020 co-option	Andrew Muir (Alliance Party)	Rachel Woods (Green (NI))	Alex Easton (DUP / Independent Unionist)	Gordon Dunne (DUP)	Alan Chambers (UUP)	5 seats 2017–present		
2021 co-option	Andrew Muir (Alliance Party)	Rachel Woods (Green (NI))	Alex Easton (DUP / Independent Unionist)	Stephen Dunne (DUP)	Alan Chambers (UUP)	5 seats 2017–present		
2022	Andrew Muir (Alliance Party)	Connie Egan (Alliance Party)	Alex Easton (DUP / Independent Unionist)	Stephen Dunne (DUP)	Alan Chambers (UUP)	5 seats 2017–present		
2024 co-option	Andrew Muir (Alliance Party)	Connie Egan (Alliance Party)	Peter Martin (DUP)	Stephen Dunne (DUP)	Alan Chambers (UUP)	5 seats 2017–present		

Note: The columns in this table are used only for presentational purposes, and no significance should be attached to the order of columns. For details of the order in which seats were won at each election, see the detailed results of that election.

== Elections ==
=== Northern Ireland Assembly ===
==== 2027 ====
2027 Assembly election: North Down – 5 seats
Party	Candidate	FPv%	Count
Party	Candidate	FPv%	1
Alliance	Connie Egan		
Green (NI)	Anthony Flynn		
Alliance	Andrew Muir		
TUV	Peter Wilson		
UUP	Pete Wray		

==== 2022 ====
2022 Assembly election: North Down – 5 seats
Party	Candidate	FPv%	Count								
Party	Candidate	FPv%	1	2	3	4	5	6	7	8	9
Ind. Unionist	**Alex Easton**	22.92%	**9,568**								
Alliance	**Andrew Muir**	16.38%	6,838	6,938	**6,970**						
DUP	**Stephen Dunne**	14.92%	6,226	6,875	6,903	6,904	6,935	6,945	**6,993**		
UUP	**Alan Chambers**	9.16%	3,825	4,328	4,434	4,447	4,538	4,564	5,734	6,352	**7,771**
Alliance	**Connie Egan**	12.51%	5,224	5,336	5,363	5,530	5,743	6,294	6,405	6,429	**6,558**
Green (NI)	Rachel Woods	6.55%	2,734	2,857	2,900	3,029	3,274	3,637	3,736	3,802	4,058
DUP	Jennifer Gilmour	4.95%	2,068	2,332	2,348	2,349	2,359	2,364	2,419	3,451	
TUV	John Gordon	3.77%	1,574	2,004	2,023	2,026	2,048	2,051	2,098		
UUP	Naomi McBurney	3.21%	1,342	1,518	1,567	1,570	1,594	1,619			
SDLP	Déirdre Vaughan	1.74%	727	742	747	1,081	1,109				
Independent	Ray McKimm	1.45%	604	717	768	783					
Sinn Féin	Thérèse McCartney	1.65%	687	695	697						
NI Conservatives	Matthew Robinson	0.61%	254	280							
Independent	Chris Carter	0.17%	72	136							
Electorate: 70,176 Valid: 41,743 (59.48%) Spoilt: 455 Quota: 6,958 Turnout: 42,198 (60.13%)

==== 2017 ====
2017 Assembly election: North Down – 5 seats
Party	Candidate	FPv%	Count						
Party	Candidate	FPv%	1	2	3	4	5	6	7
DUP	**Alex Easton**	21.29%	**8,034**						
UUP	**Alan Chambers**	18.95%	**7,151**						
Alliance	**Stephen Farry**	18.59%	**7,014**						
DUP	**Gordon Dunne**	16.21%	6,118	**7,678.68**					
Green (NI)	**Steven Agnew**	13.72%	5,178	5,220.24	5,320.78	5,388.22	5,782.32	5,979.96	**6,160.5**
UUP	William Cudworth	2.55%	964	1,029.12	1,881.62	2,585.3	2,690.5	2,726.22	3,058.06
Independent	Melanie Kennedy	3.30%	1,246	1,285.82	1,371.62	1,389.86	1,429.86	1,503.96	1,596.88
SDLP	Caoímhe McNeill	1.80%	679	681.86	686.26	707.14	800.54	1,178	1,202.88
NI Conservatives	Frank Shivers	1.70%	641	654.2	740.66	756.14	777.24	801.88	
Sinn Féin	Kieran Maxwell	1.57%	591	591.22	591.88	592.6	604.5		
Independent	Chris Carter	0.24%	92	94.2	115.98	119.1	126.7		
Independent	Gavan Reynolds	0.08%	31	32.54	37.38	38.34	40.44		
Electorate: 64,461 Valid: 37,739 (58.55%) Spoilt: 435 Quota: 6,290 Turnout: 38,174 (59.22%)

==== 2016 ====
2016 Assembly election: North Down – 6 seats
Party	Candidate	FPv%	Count										
Party	Candidate	FPv%	1	2	3	4	5	6	7	8	9	10	11
DUP	**Alex Easton**	19.72%	**6,357**										
DUP	**Gordon Dunne**	12.42%	4,004	**4,610.48**									
Green (NI)	**Steven Agnew**	12.75%	4,109	4,142.32	4,229.44	4,239.56	4,310.56	4,490.12	4,523.2	**4,607.2**			
UUP	**Alan Chambers**	10.16%	3,275	3,379.16	3,387.16	3,465.24	3,467.24	3,482.24	3,644.08	3,757.76	3,931.28	4,174.92	**5,264.92**
DUP	**Peter Weir**	9.57%	3,085	3,890.28	3,892.56	3,904.04	3,906.04	3,910.32	4,032.6	4,112.96	4,385.72	4,588.76	**4,712.76**
Alliance	**Stephen Farry**	9.35%	3,012	3,036.92	3,051.2	3,063.2	3,090.2	3,289.04	3,298.04	3,372.6	3,410.72	3,834.96	**4,049.36**
Alliance	Andrew Muir	7.41%	2,387	2,395.96	2,407.24	2,415.8	2,437.8	2,521.8	2,526.8	2,583.8	2,613.8	2,920.64	3,076.2
UUP	Carl McClean	4.64%	1,495	1,545.68	1,549.68	1,640.72	1,642	1,652	1,719.08	1,818.76	1,902.88	2,054.4	
Independent	Brian Wilson	4.39%	1,415	1,430.12	1,449.4	1,451.24	1,467.24	1,512.24	1,519.8	1,580.36	1,678.48		
UKIP	Bill Piper	2.11%	681	706.48	706.76	716.6	722.6	730.6	902.6	955.72			
NI Conservatives	Frank Shivers	2.09%	672	683.76	686.76	693.4	694.04	696.04	713.04				
TUV	John Brennan	1.89%	610	641.92	641.92	646.76	646.76	650.76					
SDLP	Conal Browne	1.32%	426	428.24	441.24	441.52	589.52						
Sinn Féin	Therese McCartney	0.95%	307	307.56	314.84	314.84							
UUP	Chris Eisenstadt	0.67%	217	234.92	235.92								
NI Labour	Maria Lourenco	0.55%	177	180.08									
Electorate: 65,760 Valid: 32,229 (49.01%) Spoilt: 368 Quota: 4,605 Turnout: 32,597 (49.57%)

==== 2011 ====
2011 Assembly election: North Down – 6 seats
Party	Candidate	FPv%	Count										
Party	Candidate	FPv%	1	2	3	4	5	6	7	8	9	10	11
DUP	**Alex Easton**	18.42%	**5,175**										
DUP	**Gordon Dunne**	13.31%	3,741	**4,120.96**									
DUP	**Peter Weir**	12.44%	3,496	**4,101.36**									
UUP	**Leslie Cree**	5.64%	1,585	1,609.38	1,610.38	1,678.3	1,691.53	2,795.81	2,853.34	3,310.34	3,361.02	**4,410.02**	
Alliance	**Stephen Farry**	11.44%	3,131	3,152.62	3,173.31	3,218.31	3,486	3,514.92	3,521.52	3,738.59	3,744.89	**4,077.89**	
Green (NI)	**Steven Agnew**	7.85%	2,207	2,220.34	2,261.57	2,314.57	2,552.8	2,605.18	2,614.64	2,811.82	2,819.8	3,193.37	**3,229.37**
Alliance	Anne Wilson	7.47%	2,100	2,115.18	2,134.41	2,171.64	2,447.64	2,482.79	2,492.36	2,658.65	2,664.32	3,078.03	3,130.03
Independent	Alan McFarland	6.69%	1,879	1,905.45	1,910.68	2,012.29	2,048.29	2,083.44	2,094.88	2,604.39	2,619.16		
Independent	Alan Chambers	6.28%	1,765	1,795.13	1,796.13	1,862.36	1,893.59	1,980.05	1,989.29				
UUP	Colin Breen	4.78%	1,343	1,358.64	1,359.64	1,443.25	1,449.17						
SDLP	Liam Logan	2.73%	768	771.91	952.91	960.91							
UKIP	Fred McGlade	2.19%	615	623.97	623.97								
Sinn Féin	Conor Kennan	1.04%	293	294.61									
Electorate: 62,170 Valid: 28,098 (45.20%) Spoilt: 430 Quota: 4,015 Turnout: 28,528 (45.89%)

==== 2007 ====
2007 Assembly election: North Down – 6 seats
Party	Candidate	FPv%	Count									
Party	Candidate	FPv%	1	2	3	4	5	6	7	8	9	10
DUP	**Alex Easton**	16.11%	**4,946**									
Alliance	**Stephen Farry**	10.20%	3,131	3,134.96	3,143.96	3,202.07	3,337.07	3,511.07	3,875.29	**4,466.29**		
UUP	**Leslie Cree**	9.56%	2,937	2,952.73	2,965.84	3,016.95	3,112.06	3,393.39	3,466.39	3,530.5	3,788.72	**4,686.72**
Green (NI)	**Brian Wilson**	9.25%	2,839	2,843.07	2,855.07	2,928.18	3,059.4	3,208.62	3,471.95	4,113.06	4,333.72	**4,571.72**
DUP	**Peter Weir**	10.99%	3,376	3,507.23	3,513.45	3,566.33	3,614.77	3,688.32	3,748.65	3,754.87	4,231.49	**4,380.47**
UUP	**Alan McFarland**	7.31%	2,245	2,250.5	2,252.5	2,282.61	2,401.72	2,481.49	2,579.49	2,641.49	2,941.03	**3,986.13**
DUP	Alan Graham	6.99%	2,147	2,501.31	2,509.42	2,559.52	2,595.18	2,700.5	2,736.83	2,746.49	3,185.47	3,255.23
UUP	Marion Smith	6.83%	2,098	2,102.62	2,106.62	2,162.95	2,234.39	2,330.72	2,397.94	2,457.05	2,641.49	
UK Unionist	Robert McCartney	5.88%	1,806	1,815.57	1,823.68	1,861.67	1,949.67	2,043.89	2,098.89	2,118.89		
SDLP	Liam Logan	3.63%	1,115	1,116.1	1,118.1	1,382.1	1,399.1	1,427.43	1,674.43			
Independent	Brian Rowan	3.89%	1,194	1,195.32	1,202.32	1,241.43	1,290.43	1,376.43				
Independent	Alan Chambers	3.68%	1,129	1,133.07	1,172.07	1,190.18	1,257.29					
NI Conservatives	James Leslie	2.81%	864	866	872	888						
Sinn Féin	Deaglan Page	1.27%	390	390	391							
PUP	Elaine Martin	1.20%	367	371	376							
Independent	Christopher Carter	0.40%	123	124								
Electorate: 57,525 Valid: 30,707 (53.38%) Spoilt: 223 Quota: 4,387 Turnout: 30,930 (53.77%)

==== 2003 ====
2003 Assembly election: North Down – 6 seats
Party	Candidate	FPv%	Count													
Party	Candidate	FPv%	1	2	3	4	5	6	7	8	9	10	11	12	13	14
UUP	**Leslie Cree**	12.65%	3,900	3,908	3,919	3,920	3,950	3,989	4,019	4,032	4,073	4,305	4,402	**4,482**		
Alliance	**Eileen Bell**	6.33%	1,951	1,957	1,962	1,970	1,983	1,992	2,008	2,595	2,820	2,946	3,602	4,137	**5,237**	
UUP	**Alan McFarland**	11.09%	3,421	3,429	3,437	3,439	3,467	3,514	3,557	3,570	3,606	3,730	3,833	4,083	4,292	**4,502**
UK Unionist	**Robert McCartney**	10.94%	3,374	3,387	3,485	3,488	3,513	3,590	3,639	3,648	3,675	3,847	3,912	4,046	4,072	**4,102**
DUP	**Peter Weir**	11.92%	3,675	3,681	3,704	3,704	3,761	3,802	3,822	3,826	3,839	3,906	3,922	4,018	4,026	**4,031**
DUP	**Alex Easton**	11.58%	3,570	3,579	3,589	3,589	3,611	3,650	3,663	3,667	3,689	3,770	3,783	3,821	3,827	**3,839**
UUP	Diana Peacocke	8.32%	2,566	2,568	2,587	2,589	2,623	2,636	2,677	2,688	2,729	2,795	2,934	3,065	3,258	3,418
SDLP	Liam Logan	4.93%	1,519	1,522	1,523	1,732	1,734	1,738	1,741	1,785	1,851	1,870	2,077	2,158		
Independent	Brian Wilson	4.38%	1,350	1,355	1,357	1,359	1,371	1,415	1,429	1,437	1,489	1,598	1,718			
NI Women's Coalition	Jane Morrice	3.83%	1,181	1,188	1,192	1,201	1,219	1,242	1,259	1,287	1,478	1,587				
Independent	Alan Chambers	3.49%	1,077	1,099	1,102	1,102	1,119	1,185	1,206	1,214	1,242					
Green (NI)	John Barry	2.37%	730	733	734	748	762	768	786	800						
Alliance	Stephen Farry	2.28%	704	708	711	722	728	740	751							
NI Conservatives	Julian Robertson	1.59%	491	492	497	497	501	508								
Independent	Alan Field	1.39%	428	430	432	432	448									
PUP	David Rose	1.02%	316	317	327	327										
Sinn Féin	Maria George	0.86%	264	265	265											
UKIP	Tom Sheridan	0.68%	209	210												
Independent	Christopher Carter	0.35%	109													
Electorate: 57,422 Valid: 30,835 (53.70%) Spoilt: 481 Quota: 4,406 Turnout: 31,316 (54.54%)

==== 1998 ====
1998 Assembly election: North Down – 6 seats
Party	Candidate	FPv%	Count											
Party	Candidate	FPv%	1	2	3	4	5	6	7	8	9	10	11	12
UK Unionist	**Robert McCartney**	21.94%	**8,188**											
UUP	**Alan McFarland**	12.47%	4,653	4,856	4,984.4	5,108.45	5,274.3	**5,466.3**						
UUP	**John Gorman**	12.65%	4,719	4,798.45	4,922.05	4,953.65	5,049.1	**5,346.1**						
Alliance	**Eileen Bell**	9.83%	3,669	3,685.8	3,795.25	3,800.6	4,268.75	4,374.15	4,579.35	4,588.05	**5,985.05**			
NI Women's Coalition	**Jane Morrice**	4.85%	1,808	1,836	1,918.45	1,932.25	2,056.3	2,232.35	2,460.2	2,478.47	2,719.82	3,027.62	3,085.82	**4,897.71**
UUP	**Peter Weir**	7.44%	2,775	2,850.6	2,890.4	2,929.8	3,049.7	3,179.9	3,664.3	3,747.82	3,920.32	4,121.74	4,593.34	**4,751.06**
DUP	Alan Graham	4.18%	1,558	1,829.25	1,879.65	2,747.65	2,778.1	2,929.45	3,136.85	3,147.29	3,167.69	3,171.47	4,423.67	4,443.45
SDLP	Marietta Farrell	5.49%	2,048	2,050.8	2,084.8	2,086.15	2,134.15	2,193.85	2,236.85	2,238.59	2,326.59	2,449.71	2,458.1	
UK Unionist	Elizabeth Roche	0.46%	173	1,798.05	1,846.5	1,992.9	2,018.9	2,062.95	2,225.2	2,230.42	2,255.57	2,264.75		
Alliance	Gavin Walker	4.55%	1,699	1,709.5	1,753.2	1,757.9	1,910.25	1,965.95	2,089.35	2,095.44				
Independent	Alan Chambers	3.71%	1,382	1,455.15	1,531.5	1,554.05	1,644.85	1,750.7						
PUP	Stewart Currie	3.69%	1,376	1,416.25	1,521.8	1,556.05	1,582.8							
Independent	Brian Wilson	3.56%	1,327	1,360.6	1,389.35	1,396.4								
DUP	St Clair McAlister	2.71%	1,013	1,291.25	1,354.1									
NI Conservatives	Leonard Fee	0.90%	337	365										
Ulster Democratic	Tom Lindsay	0.71%	265	294.75										
Labour Party NI	Vanessa Baird-Gunning	0.57%	212	217.95										
Independent	Christopher Carter	0.19%	72	77										
Natural Law	Andrea Gribben	0.10%	39	42										
Electorate: 62,942 Valid: 37,313 (59.28%) Spoilt: 561 Quota: 5,331 Turnout: 37,874 (60.17%)

=== 1996 forum ===
Successful candidates are shown in bold.

Party	Candidate(s)	Votes	Percentage
UUP	**Peter Weir**; **Alan McFarland**; Roy Bradford; John Shields; Irene Cree	9,270	25.6
UK Unionist	**Robert McCartney**; Valerie Kinghan; Patricia Watson	7,579	20.9
DUP	**St Clair McAlister**; Ruby Cooling; Cecil Noble	6,699	18.5
Alliance	**Oliver Napier**; Brian Wilson; Eileen Bell; Larry Thompson; Jane Copeland	6,186	17.1
SDLP	Owen Adams; John Burke	1,798	5.0
PUP	Victor Ash; Samuel Curry; Neil Mehaffy; Kenneth Sterrit	1,694	4.7
Ulster Democratic	James McCullough; Thomas Lindsay	651	1.8
NI Women's Coalition	Emma McGuigan; Ann Marie Foster; Jane Morrice	496	1.4
NI Conservatives	Ann Thompson; Bruce Mulligan	444	1.2
Independent Chambers	Alan Chambers; James Arbuthnot; Robert Irvine	334	0.9
Green (NI)	Paddy McEvoy; Mary Ringland	283	0.8
Sinn Féin	Máirtín Ó Muilleoir; John Smith	275	0.8
Labour coalition	John Magennis; Sean McGouran	171	0.5
Independent DUP	Thomas O'Brien; William Baxter	97	0.3
Democratic Left	Daryl Armitage; Tim Davis	95	0.3
Workers' Party	Dessie O'Hagan; Colum Mullan	60	0.2
Ulster Independence	Geoffrey Watson; Glenn Pollock	49	0.1
Independent Voice	Christopher Carter; Fidelma Carter	49	0.1
Natural Law	Peter McGowan; Thomas Mullins	15	0.0

=== 1982 Assembly election ===
1982 Assembly election: North Down – 8 seats
Party	Candidate	FPv%	Count												
Party	Candidate	FPv%	1	2	3	4	5	6	7	8	9	10	11	12	13
UPUP	**James Kilfedder**	25.56%	**13,958**												
UUP	**John Taylor**	10.71%	5,852	**7,257.62**											
DUP	**Simpson Gibson**	8.24%	4,500	4,855.68	4,913.01	4,941.9	4,985.37	**6,391.37**							
Alliance	**John Cushnahan**	8.09%	4,416	4,491.81	4,501.12	4,501.69	4,936.05	4,943.05	6,068.76	**6,069.68**					
Alliance	**Lord Dunleath**	7.03%	3,841	4,209.79	4,283.78	4,292.63	4,881.43	4,918.34	5,960.62	5,961.54	**6,161.54**				
DUP	**Wesley Pentland**	6.12%	3,340	3,621.01	3,704.8	3,723.08	3,760.71	4,089.24	4,097.24	4,345.64	4,486.78	**6,930.78**			
UUP	**Robert McCartney**	6.92%	3,782	4,402.73	4,583.54	4,606.82	4,956.52	5,015.07	5,030.07	5,033.52	5,860.36	5,978.16	**6,131.39**		
UUP	**William Bleakes**	4.93%	2,692	2,929.69	3,027.2	3,047.93	3,202.08	3,241.61	3,244.18	3,246.02	4,401.83	4,778.58	5,278.92	5,336.52	**5,383.79**
UPUP	George Green	1.75%	958	4,265.71	4,471.51	4,507.97	4,595.57	4,679.84	4,685.41	4,689.55	4,967.01	5,126.75	5,330.73	5,364.93	5,377.98
DUP	Charles Poots	5.15%	2,811	3,024.18	3,083.47	3,100.16	3,124.45	3,315.55	3,317.55	3,362.4	3,436.27				
UUP	Hazel Bradford	3.60%	1,966	2,447.65	2,693.63	2,722.22	2,931.18	3,028.23	3,032.86	3,037.69					
SDLP	Patrick Doherty	4.64%	2,536	2,546.26	2,547.73	2,548.73	2,566.73	2,567.73							
DUP	Thomas Gourley	3.77%	2,060	2,276.6	2,315.31	2,333.57	2,392.97								
Alliance	Brian Wilson	1.93%	1,055	1,117.13	1,135.26	1,136.4									
UUP	David McNarry	1.23%	671	827.18	923.71	935.34									
UUUP	Robert Gabbey	0.33%	181	217.48	228.75										
Electorate: 103,619 Valid: 54,619 (52.71%) Spoilt: 1,182 Quota: 6,069 Turnout: 55,801 (53.85%)

=== 1975 Constitutional Convention ===
1975 Constitutional Convention election: North Down – 7 seats
Party	Candidate	FPv%	Count							
Party	Candidate	FPv%	1	2	3	4	5	6	7	8
UUP	**James Kilfedder**	37.54%	**21,693**							
UUP	**John Taylor**	12.53%	**7,238**							
Vanguard	**George Green**	7.63%	4,408	**8,063.68**						
DUP	**Charles Poots**	5.13%	2,962	6,778.16	7,072.24	7,137.28	7,209.8	**7,228.64**		
Alliance	**Lord Dunleath**	7.99%	4,616	5,109.68	5,119.12	5,201.96	5,569.68	7,182.4	**9,226.4**	
Alliance	**Bertie McConnell**	5.36%	3,099	3,420.64	3,427.52	3,549.88	3,619.56	4,377.72	5,710.12	**7,064.12**
Unionist Party NI	**Viscount Brookeborough**	6.15%	3,555	4,435.6	4,459.12	4,873.68	6,340.04	6,416.04	6,480.96	**6,535.96**
UUP	Neil Oliver	2.18%	1,257	5,727.32	6,180.12	6,333.24	6,453.16	6,494.36	6,508.72	6,515.72
SDLP	Sean Hollywood	6.90%	3,988	4,005.68	4,006.48	4,014.32	4,056	4,150.52		
Alliance	Keith Jones	4.20%	2,424	2,550.48	2,553.36	2,586.2	2,646			
Unionist Party NI	William Brownlow	2.83%	1,638	1,939.92	1,950.8	2,281.84				
Unionist Party NI	Robert Campbell	1.56%	901	1,263.44	1,288.4					
Electorate: 93,884 Valid: 57,779 (61.54%) Spoilt: 989 Quota: 7,223 Turnout: 58,768 (62.60%)

=== 1973 Assembly election ===
1973 Assembly election: North Down – 7 seats
Party	Candidate	FPv%	Count												
Party	Candidate	FPv%	1	2	3	4	5	6	7	8	9	10	11	12	13
UUP	**James Kilfedder**	33.66%	**20,684**												
UUP	**John Brooke**	10.02%	6,160	**9,168.25**											
DUP	**Charles Poots**	7.10%	4,364	6,488.36	6,543.54	6,546.8	6,711.32	6,713.84	6,793.73	7,354.97	7,512.06	7,520.06	7,678.2	**10,253.2**	
Alliance	**Lord Dunleath**	7.29%	4,482	4,725.81	4,755.26	4,781.09	4,921.26	5,690.95	6,230.33	6,239.68	6,304.89	7,364.15	7,557.46	7,625.26	**7,663.26**
UUP	**Robert Campbell**	6.12%	3,760	4,936.21	5,212.73	5,215.3	5,238.4	5,250.55	5,331.36	5,365.23	5,638.74	5,644.74	6,371.19	6,966.27	**7,307.27**
UUP	**William Brownlow**	4.26%	2,620	3,776.05	4,424.88	4,426.88	4,445.39	4,455.85	4,642.62	4,698.18	5,100.23	5,168.17	6,097.92	6,524.05	**6,630.05**
Alliance	**Bertie McConnell**	5.32%	3,271	3,374.32	3,382.38	3,443.64	3,707.77	4,556.89	5,051.98	5,059.87	5,097.74	6,126.74	6,257.92	6,311.28	**6,331.28**
UUP	Andrew Donaldson	3.17%	1,950	3,320.25	3,517.72	3,525.66	3,544.99	3,556.88	3,621.11	3,660.44	4,542.17	4,551.43	5,390.1	5,903.72	6,097.72
Vanguard	George Green	3.95%	2,425	3,304.48	3,336.1	3,340.67	3,535.82	3,541.71	3,579.32	4,933.91	5,053.06	5,061.06	5,172.69		
UUP	Kathleen McClure	2.92%	1,796	2,518.61	2,636.41	2,637.41	2,672.78	2,722.71	2,771.17	2,846.2	3,191.62	3,209.25			
SDLP	Patrick McHenry	4.61%	2,833	2,835.52	2,835.52	2,846.52	2,861.15	2,917.15	3,121.15	3,123.41	3,125.35				
UUP	Hans Jess	2.00%	1,227	2,175.78	2,244.91	2,247.8	2,258.41	2,270.82	2,307.11	2,358.4					
Vanguard	Kenneth Leckey	2.10%	1,290	1,981.11	1,991.65	1,992.91	2,224.31	2,225.57	2,245.61						
NI Labour	William Allen	2.20%	1,354	1,441.57	1,445.91	1,908.56	1,928.08	1,969.22							
Alliance	Cecilia Linehan	2.43%	1,493	1,547.18	1,549.04	1,565.56	1,839.49								
Alliance	John Marks	1.14%	699	731.76	735.79	754.05									
Vanguard	David Trimble	0.73%	446	658.94	669.48	672.48									
NI Labour	Kenneth Young	0.98%	601	628.09	629.64										
Electorate: 89,682 Valid: 61,455 (68.53%) Spoilt: 755 Quota: 7,682 Turnout: 62,210 (69.37%)
