= Guy Brownlow =

British Army officer (1883–1960)

Guy Brownlow DSO DL
- Born: 26 December 1883
- Died: 19 January 1960 (aged 76)
- Allegiance: United Kingdom
- Branch: British Army
- Rank: Colonel
- Commands: Rifle Brigade (Prince Consort's Own)
- Conflicts: First World War
- Awards: Distinguished Service Order

Colonel Guy James Brownlow DSO DL (26 December 1883 – 19 January 1960) was a British Army officer.

Brownlow was born in County Monaghan, Ireland, the eldest son of William Claude Brabazon Brownlow JP and Janet Georgina Orme. He was educated at Harrow School and the Royal Military College, Sandhurst.

He was commissioned into the Rifle Brigade (Prince Consort's Own) in 1903. Brownlow attained the rank of captain in 1913. He fought in the First World War and was mentioned in dispatches three times. In 1915, he was decorated as a Companion of the Distinguished Service Order. Following the war, Brownlow left the army with the rank of colonel. He was High Sheriff of County Down in 1945 and held the office of Deputy Lieutenant in County Down in 1946.

Two of his great-great-grandfathers were the Rt. Hon. William Brownlow and Anthony Brabazon, 8th Earl of Meath.

Brownlow married Elinor Scott, the daughter of Colonel George Scott (18th Hussars), on 19 August 1920. They had three children:

1. Colonel William Stephen Brownlow (b.1921)
2. James Christy Brownlow (b.1922)
3. Anne Brownlow (b.1928), married Gerald Spring Rice, 6th Baron Monteagle of Brandon

In the 1930s Brownlow lived at Hays, in the village of Sedgehill, Wiltshire. He later lived at Portaferry, County Down until his death in 1960.
