= William Brownlow (British Army officer) =

William Brownlow JP
- Born: 9 September 1921
- Allegiance: United Kingdom
- Branch: British Army
- Rank: Colonel
- Conflicts: Second World War
- Awards: Mentioned in Despatches

Colonel William Stephen Brownlow DL JP (9 October 1921 – May 1998) was a British Army officer and Northern Irish Unionist politician.

== Early life and military service ==
Brownlow was born in Portaferry, County Down. He was the son of Colonel Guy Brownlow and Elinor Scott, the daughter of Colonel George Scott (18th Hussars). He was educated at Eton College before joining the British Army following the outbreak of the Second World War. He was commissioned into his father's former regiment, the Rifle Brigade (Prince Consort's Own). Over the course of the war, Brownlow was wounded and Mentioned in Despatches three times. He retired from the military with the rank of major in 1954. He was awarded the rank of Honorary Colonel in 1973 in the Northern Irish Militia, part of the Royal Irish Rangers.

== Politics ==
He held the office of Justice of the Peace for County Down in 1956 and was High Sheriff of Down in 1959. Brownlow was Deputy Lieutenant of County Down in 1961 and was an Ulster Unionist Party (UUP) member of the Down County Council between 1970 and 1973. He was elected to the Northern Ireland Assembly for North Down as a pro-Sunningdale UUP candidate in 1973 following the Sunningdale Agreement, but Parliament never assembled. In 1975, he stood as the Unionist Party of Northern Ireland (UPNI) candidate for North Down in the Constitutional Convention Election, but failed to be elected, being defeated by a coalition of Anti-Assembly Unionists. Brownlow stood for North Down's Westminster seat in the October 1974 general election for the UPNI, but lost to the UUP. He served as the Lord Lieutenant of Down between 1990 and 1996.

== Personal life ==
Brownlow married Eveleigh, the daughter of Lieutenant Colonel George Panter MBE, on 11 January 1961. Together they had three children:

- James George Christy Brownlow (b. 20 September 1962)
- Camilla Jane Brownlow (b. 29 July 1964)
- Melissa Anne Brownlow (b. 8 May 1968)

In his spare time, Brownlow was a leading practitioner of fox hunting, in which circles he was known as "The Major". Following his death, a Brownlow Trophy was instituted for the person who had made the "greatest contribution to country sports and conservation in Ireland" each year. During the 1960s, Brownlow used an amphibious car to cross Strangford Lough to visit his fox hounds, stopping only when he persuaded local councillors to introduce the Portaferry - Strangford Ferry service.

Northern Ireland Assembly (1973)
New assembly	Assembly Member for North Down; 1973–1974	Assembly abolished
