= Almanac of British Politics =

Reference work

The Almanac of British Politics is a reference work which aims to provide a detailed look at the politics of the United Kingdom (UK) through an approach of profiling the social, economic and historical characteristics of each parliamentary constituency (district) and of their individual representative Member of Parliament (MP).

The Almanac is broken down alphabetically by constituency, with additional material offering regional surveys of the previous election, statistical data about the seats such as those with the highest working-class population or the fewest students, the youngest and oldest and longest serving MPs.

It is particularly concerned to offer a guide to the likely political characteristics of the new seats created by the regular boundary changes or redistricting of constituencies (such as in 1983, 1997, 2005 in Scotland only, and forthcoming in the 2010 UK general election.)

The idea of the Almanac was initiated by Robert Waller, a Fellow of Magdalen College, Oxford University, in 1983, acknowledging its debt to The Almanac of American Politics, co-authored by Michael Barone and others since 1972 (also still in regular publication). Since the fifth edition (1996) Waller has been joined by a co-author responsible for profiles of MPs by Byron Criddle, Reader in politics at Aberdeen University. Each edition is rewritten to reflect changing election results and prospects.

The 8th and last edition (to date) of the Almanac, published in 2007, is 1,081 pages long. Despite its bulk, the book is known also as a guide to the nature of the United Kingdom in a broader sense than the merely political, and also for Byron Criddle's sometimes controversial and acerbic pen-portraits of politicians. According to the cover blurb of the 7th edition (2002), the broadcaster Jeremy Paxman described it as ‘a fountain of arcana and attitude’.

The Almanac contains the following tabular and statistical information:

Constituency tables

- The 10 seats with the highest %: of students; of the nine Experian Social Groups (top 20 for ‘Urban Intelligence’).
- The 20 seats with the highest %: of employed in manufacturing industry; pensioners; single-parent households; non-white residents;
- The 20 seats with the highest / lowest %: of owner occupied households; of professional/managerial workers; and household disposable income per week;
- The 20 seats with the highest / lowest: house prices; and house price % increase 2003–06;
- The 20 seats with the lowest: % of 18-year-olds in higher education.
- The 30 seats with the highest unemployment 2006.
- The most marginal and safest constituencies - 2005 general election - by party.
- The seats with over 10% Muslim / Hindu / Sikh / Jewish residents.

MP tables

- Conservative target seats
- Majorities list (%, by party)
- The 20 most rebellious MPs 2001 -2005
- The longest continuously serving MPs
- The oldest MPs (by party)
- The youngest MPs
- Unchanged constituencies

Statistics in the individual entry for each constituency

- %: increase in property values 2003–06; long-term illness; non-white; pensioners; professional/managerial; social renters; unemployment; and urban intelligence.
- average disposable income £s; and average property value £s.
- the 2005 general election result.

== Online Almanac of British Politics ==
From March 2020 an online version of the Almanac, moderated by Robert Waller, has appeared on the Vote UK website. From July 2023 this addressed the new constituency boundaries scheduled to come into force at the next UK General Election.
