= Robert Waller (pundit) =

British historian and political scientist (born 1955)

Robert Waller (born September 1955) is a British historian, election expert, author, teacher, and former opinion pollster. His best known published work is The Almanac of British Politics (eight editions, 1983–2007), a guide to the voting patterns of all United Kingdom parliamentary constituencies.

== Education and career ==
Waller was born in Stoke-on-Trent, and educated first at Buxton College in Derbyshire, and then at the University of Oxford. In 1977, he earned a first class BA in history from Balliol College, and in 1981, graduated from Merton College with an MA and D.Phil. in History. His doctoral thesis, a historical study of the Dukeries district of Nottinghamshire, was published by Oxford University Press in 1983 under the title The Dukeries Transformed. He was a Fellow of Magdalen College from 1980 to 1984.

From 1984 to 1986, Waller was a lecturer and tutor in Politics and History at the University of Oxford, as well as an assistant professor at the University of Notre Dame. In 1986, he became the research director of the Harris Research Centre, responsible for national opinion polling. He remained in this position until 1998, when he took up secondary school teaching. He has since taught at Brighton College, Dame Alice Harpur School in Bedford, and Haileybury in Hertford. In 2001 he was made head of History and Politics at the Greenacre School for Girls in Banstead, Surrey. In 2017 he moved to teach at Dunottar School, Reigate.

From 2008 until the 2010 general election, Waller contributed a monthly column to Total Politics magazine.

From March 2020 an online version of the Almanac, moderated by Waller, has appeared on the Vote UK website. From July 2023, this addressed the new constituency boundaries scheduled to come into force at the next UK general election.

== Bibliography ==
- The Dukeries Transformed. 1983. Oxford University Press. ISBN 0-19-821896-6.
- The Almanac of British Politics.
  - April 1983 (Croom Helm) ISBN 0-7099-2767-3
  - October 1983 (Croom Helm) ISBN 0-7099-2789-4
  - 1987 (Croom Helm) ISBN 0-7099-2798-3
  - 1991 (Routledge) ISBN 0-415-00508-6
  - 1995 (Routledge) ISBN 0-415-11805-0
  - 1999 (Routledge) ISBN 0-415-18541-6
  - 2002 (Routledge) ISBN 0-415-26834-6
  - 2007 (Routledge) ISBN 978-0-415-37823-9
- The Atlas of British Politics (1985). Croom Helm. ISBN 0-7099-3609-5.
- Moulding Political Opinion (with Ken Livingstone and Sir Geoffrey Finsberg) (1988). Croom Helm. ISBN 0-7099-5230-9.
- "What if the SDP-Liberal Alliance had finished second in the 1983 general election", in Duncan Brack and Iain Dale (eds), Prime Minister Portillo and other things that never happened. (2003, paperback 2004). Politico's Publishing. ISBN 1-84275-111-5
- "What if the 1903 Gladstone – MacDonald Pact had never happened", in Duncan Brack (ed.), President Gore ... and other things that never happened (2006). Politico's Publishing. ISBN 1-84275-172-7
- "What if proportional representation had been introduced in 1918" in Duncan Brack and Iain Dale (eds), Prime Minister Boris .. and other things that never happened (2011). Biteback Publishing. ISBN 978-1-84954-100-8
- 2015 General Election (with Iain Dale, Greg Callus and Daniel Hamilton) (2014). Biteback Publishing. ISBN 978-1-84954-719-2.
- The Politico's Guide to the New House of Commons 2015 (with Tim Carr and Iain Dale) (2015). Biteback Publishing. ISBN 978-1-84954-923-3.
- "What if Lyndon Johnson had been shot down in 1942" in Duncan Brack and Iain Dale (eds), Prime Minister Corbyn ... and other things that never happened (2016). Biteback Publishing. ISBN 978-1-78590-045-7
- The Politico's Guide to the New House of Commons 2017 (with Tim Carr and Iain Dale) (2017). Biteback Publishing. ISBN 978-1-78590-275-8.
- "Ramsay MacDonald" in Iain Dale ed. The Prime Ministers (2020). Hodder & Stoughton. ISBN 978-1-52931-214-0
- "What if Franklin D.Roosevelt had died of polio in 1921" in Duncan Brack and Iain Dale (eds), Prime Minister Priti ... and other things that never happened (2021). Biteback Publishing. ISBN 978-1-78590-676-3
- "Rutherford Hayes", in Iain Dale (ed.), The Presidents (2021). Hodder & Stoughton. ISBN 978-1-529-37952-5
- "Stephen", in Iain Dale (ed.), Kings and Queens (2023). Hodder & Stoughton. ISBN 978-1-529-37948-8
- "1924", in Iain Dale (ed.), British General Election Campaigns (2024). Biteback Publishing. ISBN 978-1-78590-811-8
- "Walter Ulbricht", in Iain Dale (ed.), The Dictators (2024). Hodder & Stoughton. ISBN 978-1-39972-160-8
- "Constituency profiles", in Ian Brunskill (ed.), The Times Guide to the House of Commons 2024 (2024). Times Books. ISBN 978-0-00-872675-1
- "Ashfield, 1977", in Iain Dale (ed.), British By-Elections (2025). Biteback Publishing. ISBN 978-1-785-90978-8
- "Stonewall Jackson", in Iain Dale (ed.), The Generals (2026). Hodder & Stoughton. ISBN 978-1-399-73312-0
- "1912", in Iain Dale (ed.), American Presidential Election Campaigns (2026). Biteback Publishing. ISBN 978-1-78590-979-5
