= 1982 Northern Ireland Assembly election =

← 1975	20 October 1982	1996 →

All 78 seats to the Northern Ireland Assembly 40 seats were needed for a majority
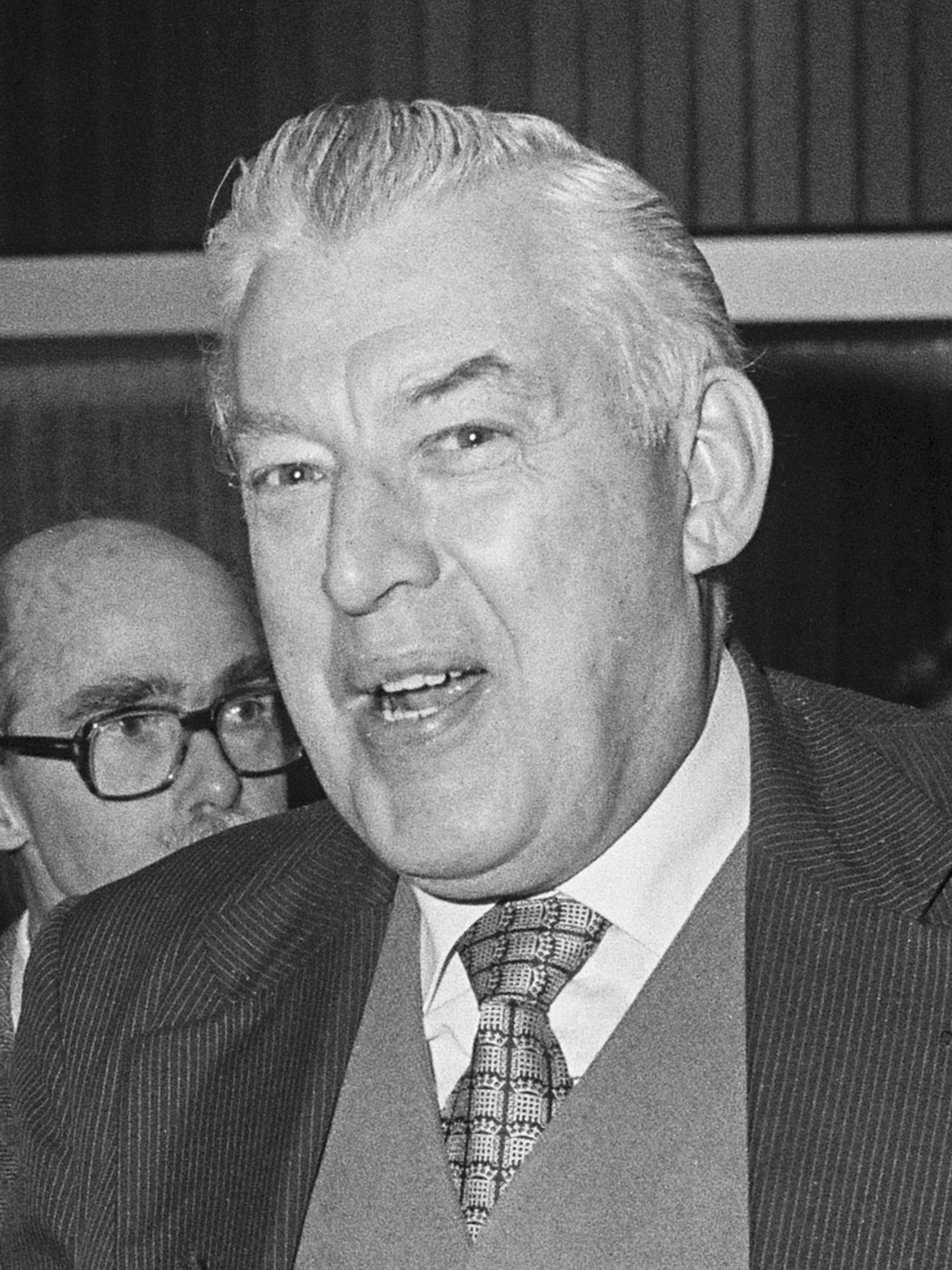

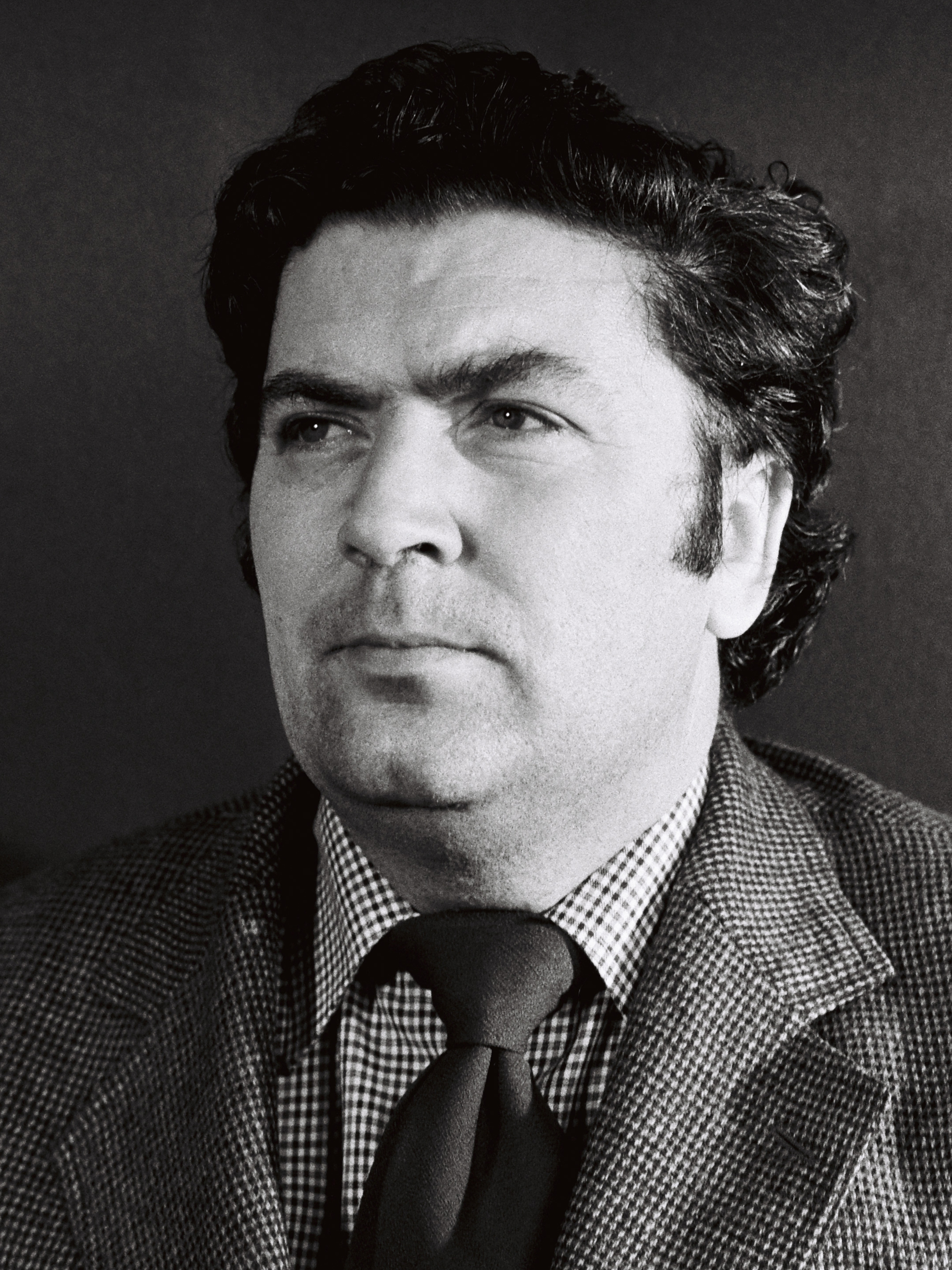

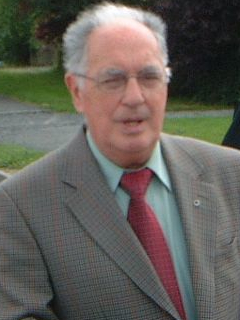
	First party	Second party	Third party
	UUP
Leader	James Molyneaux	Ian Paisley	John Hume
Party	UUP	DUP	SDLP
Leader since	September 1979	September 1971	November 1979
Leader's seat	South Antrim	North Antrim	Londonderry
Last election	33 seats, 38.1% (Note: Combined result for UUP / Vanguard.)	12 seats, 14.8%	17 seats, 23.7%
Seats won	26	21	14
Seat change	▼5 (Note: Compared to 1975 result for UUP / Vanguard.)	▲9	▼3
Popular vote	188,277	145,528	118,891
Percentage	29.7%	23.0%	18.8%
Swing	▼9.2%	▲8.2%	▼4.9%
	Fourth party	Fifth party
	APN
Leader	Oliver Napier	Ruairí Ó Brádaigh
Party	Alliance	Sinn Féin
Leader since	1972	October 1970
Leader's seat	Belfast East	None
Last election	8 seats, 9.8%	Did not contest
Seats won	10	5
Seat change	▲2	▲5
Popular vote	58,851	64,191
Percentage	9.3%	10.1%
Swing	▼0.5%	n/a
Chief Executive before election
None
Chief Executive after election
None

The 1982 Northern Ireland Assembly elections were held on 20 October 1982 in an attempt to re-establish devolution and power-sharing in Northern Ireland. Although the Northern Ireland Assembly officially lasted until 1986 (and was seen as being a continuation of the Northern Ireland Constitutional Convention of 1975) it met infrequently.

== Electoral controversy ==
The electoral system proved to be hugely controversial. While there was general acceptance that the elections should take part using the Single Transferable Vote system, the decision to use the same twelve constituency boundaries used in the 1973 Assembly election rather than the new seventeen constituency boundaries which were later adopted in the 1983 general election was heavily criticised. The issue was that the Boundary Commission for Northern Ireland's Final Recommendations, which recommended that all future Assembly elections should be held using seventeen constituencies each electing five members, had not yet been approved by Parliament and therefore remained, technically, provisional recommendations.

The consequence of this was that the elections were held using constituencies which varied greatly in size and electorate with different numbers of seats, ranging from Belfast West with an electorate of 57,726 and four members to South Antrim with an electorate of 131,734 and ten members. In the latter constituency this resulted in huge administrative problems with a record 27 candidates standing necessitating 23 counts over 36 hours with the count not completed until two days after the election.

== Response of political parties ==
On the Unionist side, the Assembly was welcomed, with some hailing it nostalgically as 'a new Stormont'. Consequently, many Nationalists were suspicious of the new body. The Irish Independence Party, which had moderate electoral success in the elections of the previous year, immediately announced that they would boycott the elections and called on other nationalists to follow suit. However Sinn Féin was keen to test its electoral support and both it and the Social Democratic and Labour Party (SDLP) announced that they would contest the elections but refuse to take any seats which they won. The smaller People's Democracy, which had won two council seats in an electoral alliance with the Irish Republican Socialist Party the previous year, did likewise.

Great interest centred on the performance of Sinn Féin, fighting its first full election and on the inter-Unionist rivalry between the Democratic Unionist Party (DUP) and the Ulster Unionist Party (UUP). The former had pulled ahead in the European election of 1979 and the Local Council Elections of 1981 but had suffered a setback in the 1982 by-election which followed the murder of Robert Bradford.

== Results ==
The results were seen as a triumph for the new electoral strategy of Sinn Féin which gained 5 seats and narrowly missed winning seats in Belfast North and Fermanagh and South Tyrone. The SDLP were disappointed with their 14 seats and one of these was subsequently lost in a by-election to the UUP as Seamus Mallon was disqualified following a successful UUP election petition on the grounds that he was ineligible as he was a member of Seanad Éireann at the time.

On the Unionist side the UUP gained a clear lead over the DUP, while the United Ulster Unionist Party failed to make an impact and, as a result, folded two years later. In the centre Alliance Party consolidated with 10 seats including unexpected wins in North and West Belfast. The Workers' Party failed to make a breakthrough despite respectable vote shares in places like North and West Belfast.

Party	Votes	%	+/-	Seats	%	+/-
UUP	188,277	29.7	-9.2	26	33.8	-5
DUP	145,528	23.0	+8.2	21	27.3	+9
SDLP	118,891	18.8	-4.9	14	18.2	-3
Sinn Féin	64,191	10.1	—	5	6.5	+5
Alliance	58,851	9.3	-0.5	10	13.0	+2
Workers' Party	17,216	2.7	+0.5	0	—	0
UPUP	14,916	2.3	-1.2	1	1.3	0
UUUP	11,550	1.8		0	—	0
Ind. Unionist	9,567	1.5	—	1	1.3	+1
Independent SDLP	2,052	0.3	-0.3	0	—	0
Independent	745	0.1	—	0	—	0
Ecology	707	0.1	—	0	—	0
Newtownabbey Labour	560	0.1	—	0	—	0
People's Democracy	442	0.1	—	0	—	0
Communist	415	0.1	—	0	—	0
Ulster Liberal	65	0.0	—	0	—	0
Peace	19	0.0	—	0	—	0
Total	633,120	100.0	0	78	100.0	0
Source: Ark

=== Votes summary ===
Popular vote
Ulster Unionist	29.7%
DUP	23.0%
SDLP	18.8%
Sinn Féin	10.1%
Alliance	9.3%
Workers' Party (Ireland)	2.7%
Ulster Popular Unionist	2.2%
UUUP	1.8%
Ind. Unionist	0.9%
Other	0.7%

=== Seats summary ===
Parliamentary seats
Ulster Unionist	33.8%
DUP	27.3%
SDLP	18.2%
Alliance	13.0%
Sinn Féin	6.5%
Ulster Popular Unionist	1.3%
Ind. Unionist	1.3%

=== Seats by constituency ===
Constituency	UUP	DUP	SDLP	SF	AP	UPUP	Ind. U
Armagh	3	1	2	1			
Belfast East	2	2			2		
Belfast North	1	1	1		1		1
Belfast South	3	1			1		
Belfast West	1		1	1	1		
Fermanagh and South Tyrone	2	1	1	1			
Londonderry	2	2	2	1			
Mid Ulster	1	2	2	1			
North Antrim	2	4	1		1		
North Down	3	2			2	1	
South Antrim	4	3	1		2		
South Down	2	2	3				
Total	26	21	14	5	10	1	1

== See also ==
- Members of the 1982 Northern Ireland Assembly
