= Member of the Legislative Assembly (Northern Ireland) =

Representatives in the Northern Ireland Assembly since 1998

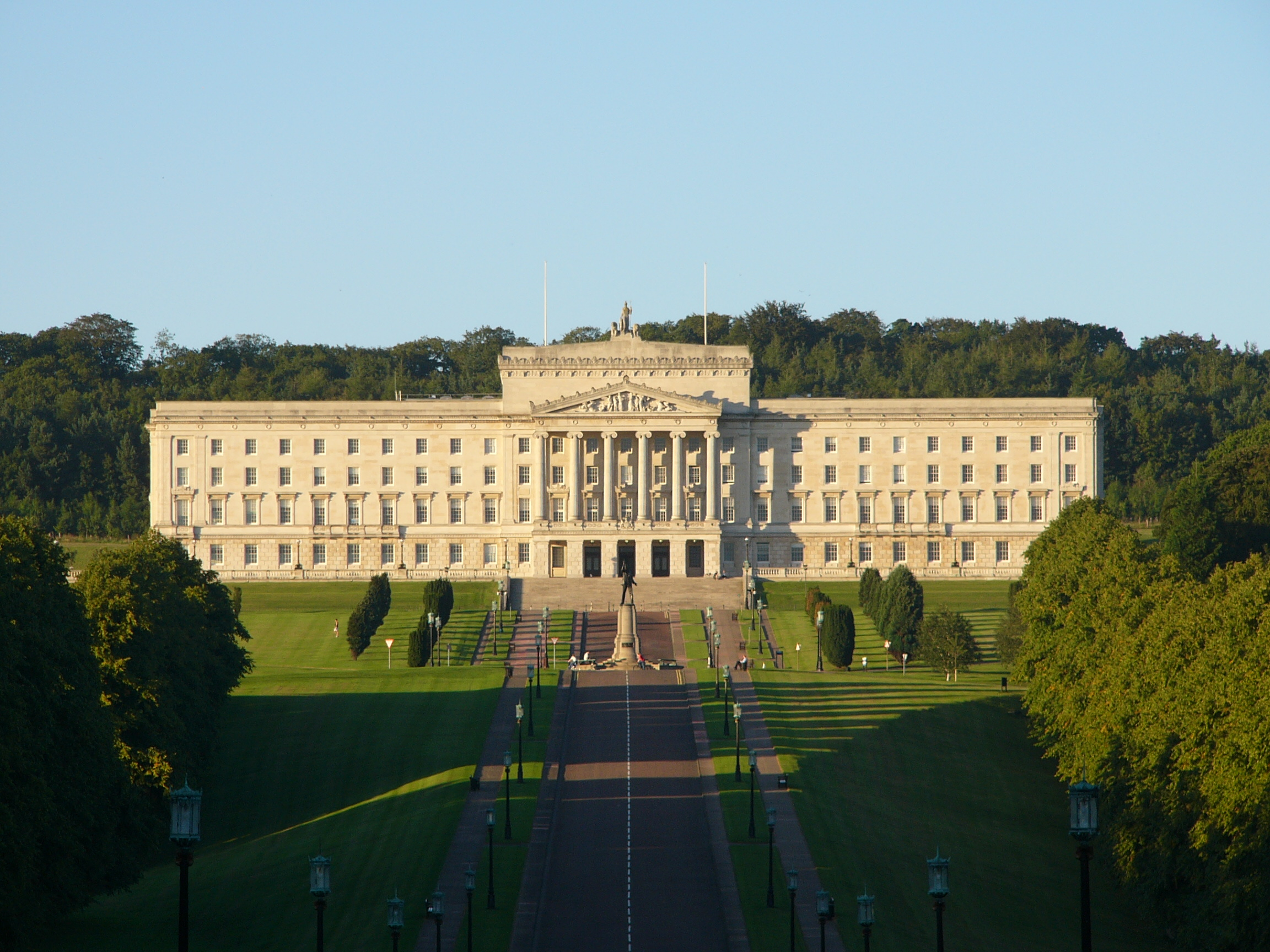
- Incumbent; 7th Assembly since 5 May 2022
- Northern Ireland Assembly
- Style: Member
- Abbreviation: MLA
- Member of: Northern Ireland Assembly
- Reports to: Speaker; Deputy Speakers
- Seat: Parliament Buildings
- Appointer: Electorate of Northern Ireland
- Term length: No more than 5 years; renewable
- Constituting instrument: Northern Ireland Act 1998
- Formation: 1 July 1998 (28 years ago)
- First holder: 1st Assembly
- Salary: £53,000 per year plus expenses
- Website: www.niassembly.gov.uk

Members of the Legislative Assembly (MLAs; Irish: Comhaltaí den Tionól Reachtach; Ulster Scots: Laa-Makkan Forgaitherars) are representatives elected by the voters to the Northern Ireland Assembly.

== About ==
The Northern Ireland Assembly has 90 elected members – five from each of 18 constituencies, the boundaries of which are the same as those used for electing members of the UK Parliament. Its role is primarily to scrutinise and make decisions on the issues dealt with by Government Departments and to consider and make legislation.

== Responsibilities ==
MLAs are responsible for representing their constituents in the Northern Ireland Assembly, and may also hold a number of executive roles within the Northern Ireland Executive.

MLAs are also responsible for proposing, debating, and voting on law in policy areas devolved to the Assembly.

MLAs may also be present on committees relating to specific policy areas, intended to serve a scrutiny function, and to examine bills within that subject area as part of the process of the bill becoming a law.

== Salary ==
The basic salary for an MLA is £55,000, while the Speaker, ministers and committee chairs receive an additional 'Office Holders Salary' on top of their basic salary.

== History ==
=== Previous similar legislators ===
From 22 June 1921 until 30 March 1972, MPs of the House of Commons of Northern Ireland and Senators of the Senate of Northern Ireland in the Parliament of Northern Ireland legislated for Northern Ireland like MLAs do today.

=== Northern Ireland Assembly legislators ===
Following a referendum on the Belfast Agreement on 23 May 1998 and the granting of Royal Assent to the Northern Ireland Act 1998 on 19 November 1998; a Northern Ireland Assembly and Northern Ireland Executive were established by the Labour government of Prime Minister Tony Blair. The process was known as devolution and was set up to give Northern Ireland devolved legislative powers. MLAs are responsible for the Northern Ireland Assembly.

=== 2017 Northern Ireland Assembly election ===
The Assembly Members (Reduction of Numbers) Act (Northern Ireland) 2016 resulted in the number of MLAs being reduced from 108 to 90. This change was first implemented in the snap Assembly election in March 2017.

== Members of the Legislative Assembly ==
- Members of the Northern Ireland Assembly elected in 2022
- Members of the Northern Ireland Assembly elected in 2017
- Members of the Northern Ireland Assembly elected in 2016
- Members of the Northern Ireland Assembly elected in 2011
- Members of the Northern Ireland Assembly elected in 2007
- Members of the Northern Ireland Assembly elected in 2003
- Members of the Northern Ireland Assembly elected in 1998
- Members of the Northern Ireland Assembly elected in 1982
- Members of the Northern Ireland Assembly elected in 1973

== See also ==
- List of female members of the Northern Ireland Assembly
- Member of Parliament
- Member of the Scottish Parliament
- Member of the Senedd
- Teachta Dála
