= Northern Ireland Assembly (1982) =

Legislature of Northern Ireland 1982–1986

- Devolved Assembly

Type
- Type: Unicameral

History
- Established: 20 October 1982
- Disbanded: 23 June 1986
- Preceded by: Northern Ireland Constitutional Convention
- Succeeded by: Northern Ireland Forum

Leadership
- Speaker: James Kilfedder
- Seats: 78

Elections
- Voting system: STV

Meeting place
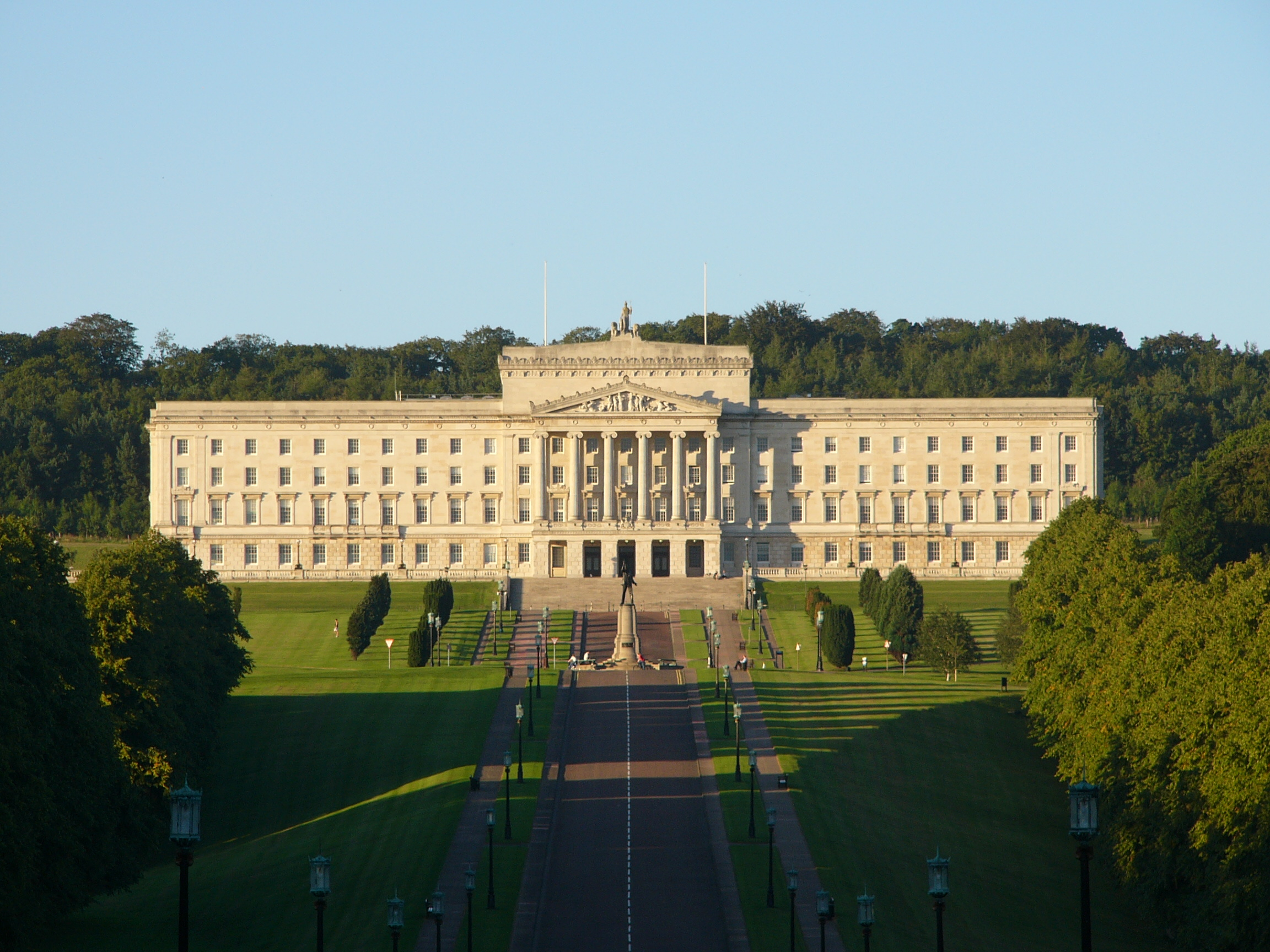
- Parliament Buildings, Stormont, Belfast

The Northern Ireland Assembly established in 1982 represented an ultimately unsuccessful attempt to restore the devolution to Northern Ireland which had been suspended 10 years previously. The Assembly was dissolved in 1986.

== Origins ==
The Assembly emerged as a result of initiatives by the then Secretaries of State for Northern Ireland, Humphrey Atkins and James Prior. The first step in this process was a white paper called The Government of Northern Ireland: A Working Paper for a Conference, published on 20 November 1979. This established a conference, attended the following year by the Democratic Unionist Party, the Alliance Party and the Social Democratic and Labour Party (SDLP). (The UUP refused to become involved in protest at a decision to allow discussions on an Irish dimension, discussions which the DUP also boycotted.) Talks between the DUP, Alliance and SDLP took place between 7 January and 24 March 1980, but failed to reach agreement.

In July 1980, the British Government published a discussion document, "The Government of Northern Ireland: Proposals for Further Discussion", which suggested creating a devolved Assembly either with compulsory power sharing or majority rule. The power sharing option proved unacceptable to Unionists while Nationalists and the Alliance Party were reluctant to return to the majority rule model. Consequently, on 27 November 1980, Humphrey Atkins, the secretary of state for Northern Ireland, reported to the House of Commons that there was little prospect for a devolved government in Northern Ireland due to a lack of consensus amongst the parties.

With 1981 dominated by the hunger strikes and the prisons issue, constitutional initiatives took a back seat to the security situation. However, on 5 April 1982, Atkins' successor James Prior published a white paper "Northern Ireland: A Framework for Devolution" which proposed what was referred to as partial or rolling devolution. Under the proposals, a 78-member assembly would be elected by proportional representation using the single transferable vote as in 1973. The Assembly's role at first would only be to scrutinise government departments as the white paper stated its role would be "consultative and deliberative, including scrutiny of draft legislation and making reports and recommendations to the Secretary of State which he will lay before Parliament." An executive could be formed consisting of not more than 13 members.

However, powers could be gradually devolved to the Assembly if 70 per cent of Assembly members agreed. These powers would be transferred back to the secretary of state if that consent was later withdrawn. Furthermore, some functions such as law and order would remain with the secretary of state, even if full devolution was achieved. The British government was clear that it was an "essential precondition" for a devolved administration to successfully function that any proposals needed the support of both Unionists and Nationalists in Northern Ireland. Cross border issues would remain the prerogative of the Westminster Parliament.

== Election ==
The electoral system proved to be hugely controversial. While there was general acceptance that the elections should take part using the Single Transferable Vote system, the decision to use the same 12 constituency boundaries used in 1973 rather than the new 17 constituency boundaries which were later adopted in 1983 was heavily criticised.

Great interest centred on the performance of Sinn Féin, fighting its first full election in many decades and on the inter-Unionist rivalry between the DUP and the Ulster Unionist Party (UUP). The former had pulled ahead in the European election of 1979 and the Local Council Elections of 1981 but had suffered a setback in the 1982 Belfast South by-election which followed the murder of Robert Bradford.

The results were seen as a positive step for the new electoral strategy of Sinn Féin which gained 5 seats on an abstentionist ticket and narrowly missed winning seats in Belfast North and Fermanagh and South Tyrone. The SDLP, also campaigning on abstentionism, were disappointed with their 14 seats; one of these was subsequently lost in a by-election to the UUP as Seamus Mallon was disqualified following a successful UUP election petition on the grounds that he was ineligible as he was a member of Seanad Éireann at the time. On the Unionist side the UUP gained a clear lead over the DUP, while the United Ulster Unionist Party (UUUP) failed to make an impact and, as a result, folded two years later. In the centre Alliance consolidated with 10 seats including unexpected wins in North and West Belfast. The Workers Party failed to make a breakthrough despite respectable vote shares in places like North and West Belfast.

== Assembly 1982–1986 ==
The UUP under James Molyneaux had attempted to block moves towards devolution earlier in 1982 and after the election tried frustrating the creation of the new Assembly with a number of diversionary moves. However, by Spring 1983 the UUP agreed to serve on the Committees, with the previously agreed exception of their leader and deputy leader, Molyneaux and Harold McCusker. UUP member for Mid-Ulster William Thompson publicly appealed to the party to enter the Assembly, stating that the party was "totally opposed" to power-sharing with the SDLP. In contrast, the DUP and Alliance were enthusiastic advocates for the Assembly and eagerly applied themselves to working the scrutiny Committees, all of which were functioning by March 1983.

The SDLP abstained from the Assembly outright because the party did not believe the initiative represented a serious political solution to Northern Ireland's problems, with Unionists declaring their unwillingness to share power with the SDLP before the election was even held and the absence of an "Irish dimension." The SDLP were further discouraged from participating after SDLP Deputy Leader Seamus Mallon was disqualified from the Assembly for accepting an appointment to Seanad Éireann, following legal proceedings initiated by UUP deputy leader Harold McCusker. Mallon described his disqualification as a "symbolic disbarment" of the SDLP from political life in Northern Ireland and said that the British Government was guilty of a "complete portfolio of abuses of democracy". Even moderate SDLP representatives who had previously been in favour of entering the Assembly believed the move spelled the end of any chance of the party participating.

The SDLP's representatives were by this time demoralised, unsure of what role constitutional nationalism had in Northern Ireland and seriously considered a mass resignation of their Assembly seats, even with the risk that Sinn Féin might take them in the ensuing by-election. The SDLP felt further vindicated in abstaining from the Assembly after Harold McCusker allegedly told the Alliance Party's John Cushnahan he could not support him as chairman of the education committee because he was Catholic. John Hume said it was no surprise to the SDLP that the UUP, through "its allegedly most liberal spokesman" would not have a Catholic, even one who accepts the Union, as the "powerless chairman of powerless committee" in a powerless Assembly:

The fact that the Unionist Party regards the State education system, paid for by the taxes of the entire community as the exclusive property of one section of the community underlines more starkly than ever the totally sectarian nature of Northern Ireland.

The SDLP later instead concentrated on the New Ireland Forum hosted in Dublin by the Irish government. Taoiseach Garret FitzGerald speaking in January 1983 opined that in retrospect the SDLP's decision to abstain was a "wise judgement". FitzGerald believed the move prevented an even larger proportion of the "frustrated minority population" voting for Sinn Féin and added that "There is no point in the SDLP attending the Assembly, in which the parties of the vast majority of seats are committed against any possibility of power-sharing... That's, just a dead-end, a cul-de-sac." Fitzgerald said the Irish Government was considering how it could support the SDLP. He said he wished to sustain the SDLP as a moderate nationalist party because an undermining of its position FitzGerald feared would be "highly dangerous" for the stability of the entire island.

In May 1983, the Assembly debated a DUP motion calling for the continuation of the Assembly as a scrutinising body and proposed a new committee to outline a plan for the re-introduction of devolved government in Northern Ireland. The UUP proposed an amendment to focus solely on getting devolution established and neglect the Assembly. The Alliance Party proposed their own amendment, insisting that devolution must involve power-sharing between Unionists and Nationalists. All three proposals were voted down, with the UUP and DUP voting against each other and both Unionist parties uniting to defeat Alliance's power-sharing amendment. The following month the Secretary of State, James Prior, made his second appearance before the Assembly and stressed that it was an "essential precondition" for devolved government to operate successfully in Northern Ireland that any proposals must have substantial support from "both sides of the community". The DUP's Jim Allister stated in a speech responding to Prior that if the DUP had to decide between having no devolved government and a power-sharing government with the SDLP or "other representatives of Republicanism" his party wouldn't hesitate in opting for the former.

In June 1983 the Assembly passed a motion, supported by the DUP and UUP, demanding that British authorities "crack down" on the flying of the Irish tricolour in Northern Ireland. The motion called for stringent enforcement of the Flags and Emblems Act and deplored recent incidents where the tricolour has been publicly flown. Alliance introduced an amendment to give the RUC a more general power to remove flags which was defeated, although Alliance representative David Cook said in the chamber he deplored the "deliberate and provocative" displaying of the tricolour. UUP elected member Edgar Graham in supporting the motion lamented there had been so few recent prosecutions under the Flags and Emblems Act, and described the tricolour as the flag of a "state which harboured murderers" and called on the RUC and British Army not to ignore the flying of the flag. DUP member George Seawright described the tricolour as a "provocative rebel rag".

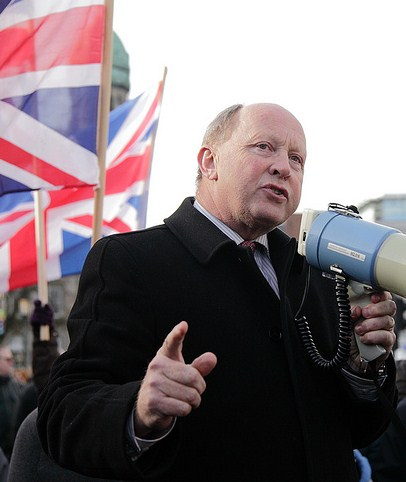
Jim Allister served as DUP Assembly Chief Whip and vice-chairman of Scrutiny Committee of Department of Finance and Personnel

When the Assembly reconvened in November 1983, Prior held a press conference during which he asserted that the Unionists could have done more to encourage the SDLP to participate in the Assembly and restated his opinion that the Assembly could not move beyond the initial phase without buy-in from Nationalists, stating "if Unionists want devolved government they have to show they are prepared to meet the SDLP and make statements that will encourage them to take their places." Days later republican paramilitaries opened fire on churchgoers at a Pentecostal Church in Darkley, County Armagh; in protest the UUP withdrew from the Assembly citing what they regarded as inadequate security. In the following months four UUP representatives (John Carson, Raymond Ferguson, James Kirkpatrick and William Thompson) defied the party line and returned to the Assembly. Westminster UUP MP Ken Maginnis attempted to amend the 1982 Act by altering the 70 per cent requirement so that it only applied to those attending the Assembly rather than the total elected membership, meaning a devolved government could be created without a role for Nationalist politicians. The Amendment was unsuccessful. The UUP returned to the Assembly in May 1984.

Writing in December 1983 on a possible new political initiative to entice the SDLP into participating in the Assembly, Belfast Telegraph columnist Barry White said:

If it's a new attempt to involve the SDLP, let me sound a note of caution. Anyone who thinks that to introduce the SDLP into that cauldron of sectarianism would be to produce agreement, rather than chaos, should be sentenced to watching a few years of TV confrontation

Later that year the UUP published their policy document on local administration, arguing the "rolling devolution" envisioned by Jim Prior had failed. The UUP opposed power-sharing, citing the Northern Ireland Constitutional Convention report of 1975 and also rejected the "Irish dimension" sought by the SDLP. The UUP instead proposed that there would be no devolved government and the Assembly would make decisions within the areas of power granted to it by an enabling legislation, but not actually pass legislation. The DUP also published a policy document on devolution in 1984. In it the DUP, like the UUP, rejected power-sharing with the SDLP but in contrast argued for the restoration of a majority rule government led by a Prime Minister of Northern Ireland, albeit with a nod to "safeguards" for minorities.

On 19 June 1984, Jack Allen, Chairman of the Devolution Report Committee, wrote to SDLP leader John Hume asking for a submission on the views of the SDLP as to how progress might be achieved towards a devolved administration. Hume did not respond to the letter but Allen sent two further invitations in September and November, assuring Hume of the sincerity of the committee's intentions. After two years of operation there was a growing confidence in the future of the Assembly amongst the members who attended. On 4 December 1984 the new Secretary of State, Douglas Hurd, made his first (and last) appearance before the Assembly. After speaking on anti-terrorism efforts and economic efforts, Hurd also restated British government policy on the necessity of devolved government with the widest possible support. But his speech ended with a warning which was not lost on some of the audience – that if the Government's plans for the Assembly did not pan out, the British Government would continue its search for new "structures and processes" in Northern Ireland and also continue dialogue with the Irish government.

Throughout 1985 the idea of the Irish Government having input in Northern Ireland's internal workings gained traction in the public space as Hurd admitted such arrangements were being actively discussed. Unionist alarm at the seeming involvement of the Irish Government intensified during the summer marching season as the Royal Ulster Constabulary (RUC) banned or restricted several Orange Order marches through Catholic areas. The final meeting of the Assembly before the 4 July recess was marked by disorder and two Alliance politicians were ordered to leave the chamber for referring to DUP members as "thugs" and "gangsters".

The growing anxiety of Unionists was highlighted when during the summer recess James Molyneaux and Ian Paisley sent a letter to Margaret Thatcher signaling their readiness to consider any "reasonable" proposal for safeguarding Catholic/Nationalists interests in a devolved government short of actual seats in Cabinet (i.e. no power-sharing). However, in response Thatcher simply restated the British Government's position. The Assembly quickly adapted these proposals in October after reconvening. Set against a backdrop of the new Secretary of State Tom King visiting Dublin before meeting Unionist leaders, it could be interpreted as a last attempt to shore up the Unionist position of a Unionist-controlled local government for Northern Ireland.

A poster used by the anti-Agreement Ulster Says No campaign

The Anglo-Irish Agreement was signed by Margaret Thatcher and Garret FitzGerald on 15 November 1985 at Hillsborough Castle and gave the Irish government for the first time a consultative role in the affairs of Northern Ireland through an "Inter Governmental Conference". Unionists were angry and felt bitterly betrayed, and months of protests and street violence followed. On 16 November the Assembly held a special adjournment debate at which the members, bar Alliance, voted to request a referendum in Northern Ireland on the Agreement. On 5 December the DUP proposed a motion to set up a "Committee on the Government of Northern Ireland" with a remit "to examine the implication of the Anglo-Irish Agreement for the government and future of Northern Ireland and the operation of the Northern Ireland Constitution Act in 1973 and the Northern Ireland Act 1982." All normal meetings of the Assembly and its scrutiny Committees were also suspended except for the Finance and Personnel Committee, which was directed to investigate the implications of the Agreement for Northern Ireland's civil service. Only the Speaker would be allowed to reconvene the Assembly, after consultation with the Business Committee. In response the Alliance party withdrew from the Assembly altogether. This left only forty-nine of the seventy-eight elected members actually attending the Assembly.

From January to March 1986 the functioning of the Assembly deteriorated further as Unionists resigned from committees and efforts from Tom King to initiate dialogue with the rump Assembly were rejected by Unionist politicians. On 13 March at the recommendation of the "Grand Committee" established in November all scrutiny Committees were effectively abolished. From then on the Assembly was only a platform for Unionist opposition to the Anglo-Irish Agreement. On 15 May, six months after its signing, fourteen DUP members commandeered the telephone switchboard at Parliament Buildings and lectured all callers about the iniquities of the Agreement.

On 23 June the Speaker read out a letter from the private secretary to the Secretary of State stating that he had ordered the dissolution the Assembly. Twenty-one Unionist representatives refused to leave the Assembly chamber until they were forcibly evicted by the RUC at the request the clerk of the chamber in the early hours of the following morning. A crowd of demonstrators gathered outside attempted to break into the building and threw stones and other missiles at police. As he was dragged out Ian Paisley warned RUC officers "don't come crying to me when your homes are attacked... because you'll reap what you sowed" (referring to widespread attacks by militant loyalists on the homes of RUC officers in preceding months) and at a follow-up press conference asserted that Northern Ireland was on the "verge of civil war." Of the twenty-one Unionist politicians removed, only two were members of the UUP, including Jeffrey Donaldson. Alliance party leader John Cushnahan labelled Paisley's remarks as "fascist" and called on the UUP to distance themselves from Paisley's behaviour.

== Aftermath ==
The absence of Nationalist parties meant that the planned devolution never took place, while the UUP also intermittently boycotted proceedings. Following the Anglo-Irish Agreement of November 1985, Unionists insisted on using the debating chamber to protest at the Agreement, resulting in an Alliance walk-out on 5 December 1985 and subsequent boycott. As a result, the government dissolved the Assembly on 23 June 1986, and it would be over a decade before a new Assembly was restored to Northern Ireland.

== Speaker of the Northern Ireland Assembly ==
- 1982–1986 James Kilfedder (Ulster Popular Unionist Party)
