= Alliance Party of Northern Ireland election results =

UK political party election results

This article lists the Alliance Party of Northern Ireland's election results in UK parliamentary elections.

== Summary of general election performance ==
Year	Number of Candidates	Total votes	Average votes per candidate	% UK vote	% NI vote	Change (percentage points)	Saved deposits	Number of MPs (out of NI total)
1974 Feb	3	22,660	7,553	0.1	3.2	N/A	1	0 / 12
1974 Oct	5	44,644	8,929	0.2	6.4	+0.1	4	0 / 12
1979	12	82,892	6,908	0.3	11.9	+0.1	4	0 / 12
1983	12	61,275	5,106	0.2	8.0	−0.1	5	0 / 17
1987	16	72,671	4,542	0.2	10.0	0.0	11	0 / 17
1992	16	68,665	4,292	0.2	8.7	0.0	11	0 / 17
1997	17	62,972	3,704	0.2	8.0	0.0	11	0 / 18
2001	10	28,999	2,900	0.1	3.6	−0.1	5	0 / 18
2005	12	28,291	2,358	0.1	3.9	0.0	7	0 / 18
2010	18	42,762	2,376	0.2	6.3	+0.1	8	1 / 18
2015	18	61,556	3,420	0.2	8.6	0.0	10	0 / 18
2017	18	64,553	3,586	0.2	7.9	0.0	10	0 / 18
2019	18	134,115	7,451	0.4	16.8	+0.2	16	1 / 18
2024	18	117,191	6,511	0.2	15.0	−1.8	14	1 / 18

== February 1974 general election ==
Constituency	Candidate	Votes	%	Position
Armagh	Robin Glendinning	4,983	8.1	3
Belfast South	David Cook	5,118	9.9	3
South Antrim	Charles Kinahan	12,559	17.6	2

== October 1974 general election ==
Constituency	Candidate	Votes	%	Position
Belfast North	John Ferguson	3,807	8.1	3
Belfast South	John Glass	11,715	23.0	2
North Antrim	Hugh Wilson	8,689	14.6	2
North Down	Keith Jones	9,973	17.5	2
South Antrim	Charles Kinahan	10,460	15.3	2

== 1979 general election ==
Constituency	Candidate	Votes	%	Position
Armagh	William Ramsay	2,071	3.2	5
Belfast East	Oliver Napier	15,066	29.6	3
Belfast North	John Cushnahan	4,120	9.7	5
Belfast South	Basil Glass	11,745	25.1	2
Belfast West	John Cousins	2,021	6.1	5
Fermanagh and South Tyrone	Peter Acheson	1,070	1.7	5
Londonderry	Arthur Barr	5,830	9.2	3
Mid Ulster	Aidan Lagan	3,481	5.3	4
North Antrim	Hugh Wilson	7,797	11.9	3
North Down	Keith Jones	13,364	21.6	2
South Antrim	Charles Kinahan	11,914	16.2	2
South Down	Patrick Forde	4,407	6.8	3

== By-elections, 1979–83 ==
Election	Candidate	Votes	%	Position
August 1981 Fermanagh and South Tyrone by-election	Seamus Close	1,930	3.0	3
1982 Belfast South by-election	David Cook	11,726	26.9	2

== 1983 general election ==
Constituency	Candidate	Votes	%	Position
Belfast East	Oliver Napier	9,373	24.1	3
Belfast North	Paul Maguire	3,879	9.1	5
Belfast South	David Cook	8,945	23.9	2
East Antrim	Seán Neeson	7,620	20.0	3
East Londonderry	Martha McGrath	2,401	4.7	5
Foyle	Gerard O'Grady	1,108	2.1	4
Lagan Valley	Seamus Close	4,593	11.3	3
Mid Ulster	Aidan Lagan	1,735	3.2	5
North Down	John Cushnahan	9,015	22.1	2
South Antrim	Gordon Mawhinney	4,612	11.9	3
South Down	Patrick Forde	1,823	3.6	5
Strangford	Addie Morrow	6,171	15.8	3

== By-elections, 1983–87 ==
Election	Candidate	Votes	%	Position
1986 Belfast East by-election	Oliver Napier	5,917	17.4	2
1986 Belfast North by-election	Paul Maguire	5,072	16.7	2
1986 Belfast South by-election	David Cook	7,635	25.0	2
1986 East Antrim by-election	Seán Neeson	5,405	15.1	2
1986 North Down by-election	John Cushnahan	8,066	20.8	2

== 1987 general election ==
Constituency	Candidate	Votes	%	Position
Belfast East	John Alderdice	10,574	32.1	2
Belfast North	Tom Campbell	2,871	7.8	6
Belfast South	David Cook	6,963	21.3	2
East Antrim	Seán Neeson	8,582	25.6	2
East Londonderry	Paddy McGowan	3,237	6.6	4
Fermanagh and South Tyrone	John Haslett	950	1.7	5
Foyle	Elizabeth Zammitt	1,276	2.6	4
Lagan Valley	Seamus Close	5,728	13.8	2
Mid Ulster	Paddy Bogan	1,846	3.5	4
Newry and Armagh	William H. Jeffrey	664	1.3	4
North Antrim	John Gareth Williams	5,140	12.4	3
North Down	John Cushnahan	7,932	19.4	3
South Antrim	Gordon Mawhinney	5,808	16.0	2
South Down	Siobhan Laird	1,069	1.9	4
Strangford	Addie Morrow	7,553	20.3	2
Upper Bann	Fionnuala Cook	2,487	5.9	4

== By-elections, 1987–92 ==
Election	Candidate	Votes	%	Position
1990 Upper Bann by-election	William Ramsay	948	2.7	7

== 1992 general election ==
Constituency	Candidate	Votes	%	Position
Belfast East	John Alderdice	10,650	29.8	2
Belfast North	Tom Campbell	2,246	6.3	4
Belfast South	John Montgomery	5,054	15.0	3
East Antrim	Seán Neeson	9,132	23.3	3
East Londonderry	Paddy McGowan	3,613	6.8	4
Fermanagh and South Tyrone	Eric Bullick	950	1.7	5
Foyle	Lara McIlroy	1,390	2.7	4
Lagan Valley	Seamus Close	6,207	12.7	2
Mid Ulster	Ann Gormley	1,506	2.8	4
Newry and Armagh	Eileen Bell	972	1.8	4
North Antrim	John Gareth Williams	3,442	7.6	4
North Down	Addie Morrow	6,611	14.7	3
South Antrim	John K. Blair	5,244	12.4	3
South Down	Michael Healey	1,542	2.5	4
Strangford	Kieran McCarthy	7,585	16.9	3
Upper Bann	William Ramsay	2,541	5.6	4

== By-elections, 1992–97 ==
Election	Candidate	Votes	%	Position
1995 North Down by-election	Oliver Napier	6,970	25.4	3

== 1997 general election ==
Constituency	Candidate	Votes	%	Position
Belfast East	Jim Hendron	9,288	23.8	3
Belfast North	Tom Campbell	2,221	5.4	4
Belfast South	Steve McBride	5,112	12.9	4
East Antrim	Seán Neeson	6,929	20.2	2
East Londonderry	Yvonne Boyle	2,427	6.0	5
Fermanagh and South Tyrone	Stephen Farry	977	2.0	4
Foyle	Helen-Marie Bell	817	1.7	4
Lagan Valley	Seamus Close	7,635	17.2	2
Mid Ulster	Ephrem Bogues	460	0.9	4
Newry and Armagh	Pete Whitcroft	1,015	1.9	4
North Antrim	David Alderdice	2,845	6.2	5
North Down	Oliver Napier	7,554	20.7	3
South Antrim	David Ford	4,668	11.6	3
South Down	Julian Crozier	1,711	3.5	4
Strangford	Kieran McCarthy	5,467	13.1	3
Upper Bann	William Ramsay	3,017	6.3	5
West Tyrone	Ann Gormley	829	1.8	4

== By-elections, 1997–2001 ==
Election	Candidate	Votes	%	Position
2000 South Antrim by-election	David Ford	2,031	6.6	5

== 2001 general election ==
Constituency	Candidate	Votes	%	Position
Belfast East	David Alderdice	5,832	15.8	3
Belfast South	Geraldine Rice	2,042	5.4	5
East Antrim	John Matthews	4,483	12.5	3
East Londonderry	Yvonne Boyle	1,625	4.1	5
Foyle	Colm Kavanagh	579	1.2	5
Lagan Valley	Seamus Close	7,624	16.6	2
North Antrim	Jayne Dunlop	1,258	2.6	5
South Antrim	David Ford	1,969	4.5	5
South Down	Betty Campbell	685	1.3	5
Strangford	Kieran McCarthy	2,902	6.7	3

== 2005 general election ==
Constituency	Candidate	Votes	%	Position
Belfast East	Naomi Long	3,746	12.2	3
Belfast North	Marjorie Hawkins	438	1.4	5
Belfast South	Geraldine Rice	2,012	6.3	5
East Antrim	Seán Neeson	4,869	15.3	3
East Londonderry	Yvonne Boyle	924	2.6	5
Lagan Valley	Seamus Close	4,316	10.1	3
North Antrim	Jayne Dunlop	1,357	3.0	5
North Down	David Alderdice	2,451	7.6	3
South Antrim	David Ford	3,278	8.6	5
South Down	Julian Crozier	613	1.3	5
Strangford	Kieran McCarthy	3,332	9.0	3
Upper Bann	Alan Castle	955	2.2	5

== 2010 general election ==
Constituency	Candidate	Votes	%	Position
Belfast East	Naomi Long	12,839	37.2	1
Belfast North	Billy Webb	1,809	4.9	5
Belfast South	Anna Lo	5,114	15.0	4
Belfast West	Máire Hendron	596	1.9	5
East Antrim	Gerry Lynch	3,377	11.1	3
East Londonderry	Barney Fitzpatrick	1,922	5.5	6
Fermanagh and South Tyrone	Vasundhara Kamble	437	0.9	4
Foyle	Keith McGrellis	223	0.6	6
Lagan Valley	Trevor Lunn	4,174	11.4	3
Mid Ulster	Ian Butler	397	1.0	6
Newry and Armagh	Andrew Muir	545	1.2	6
North Antrim	Jayne Dunlop	1,368	3.2	6
North Down	Stephen Farry	1,876	5.6	3
South Antrim	Alan Lawther	2,607	7.7	5
South Down	David Griffin	560	1.3	7
Strangford	Deborah Girvan	2,828	8.7	3
Upper Bann	Brendan Heading	1,231	3.0	5
West Tyrone	Michael Bower	859	2.3	5

== By-elections, 2010–15 ==
Election	Candidate	Votes	%	Position
2011 Belfast West by-election	Aaron McIntyre	122	0.5	6
2013 Mid Ulster by-election	Eric Bullick	487	1.3	4

== 2015 general election ==
Constituency	Candidate	Votes	%	Position
Belfast East	Naomi Long	16,978	42.8	2
Belfast North	Jason O'Neill	2,941	7.3	4
Belfast South	Paula Bradshaw	6,711	17.2	3
Belfast West	Gerard Catney	636	1.8	7
East Antrim	Stewart Dickson	5,021	15.0	3
East Londonderry	Yvonne Boyle	2,642	7.6	5
Fermanagh and South Tyrone	Hannah Su	658	1.3	5
Foyle	David Hawthorne	835	2.3	5
Lagan Valley	Trevor Lunn	5,544	13.9	3
Mid Ulster	Eric Bullick	778	1.9	7
Newry and Armagh	Kate Nicholl	841	1.7	4
North Antrim	Jayne Dunlop	2,351	5.6	6
North Down	Andrew Muir	3,086	8.6	3
South Antrim	Neil Kelly	3,576	9.8	4
South Down	Martyn Todd	1,622	3.8	6
Strangford	Kellie Armstrong	4,687	13.8	3
Upper Bann	Peter Lavery	1,780	3.8	5
West Tyrone	Stephen Donnelly	869	2.2	5

== 2017 general election ==
Constituency	Candidate	Votes	%	Position
Belfast East	Naomi Long	15,443	36.0	2
Belfast North	Sam Nelson	2,475	5.4	3
Belfast South	Paula Bradshaw	7,946	18.2	3
Belfast West	Sorcha Eastwood	731	1.9	5
East Antrim	Stewart Dickson	5,950	15.6	2
East Londonderry	Chris McCaw	2,538	6.2	5
Fermanagh and South Tyrone	Noreen Campbell	886	1.7	4
Foyle	John Doherty	847	1.8	5
Lagan Valley	Aaron McIntyre	4,996	11.1	3
Mid Ulster	Fay Watson	1,094	2.3	5
Newry and Armagh	Jackie Coade	1,256	2.3	5
North Antrim	Patricia O'Lynn	2,723	5.6	5
North Down	Andrew Muir	3,639	9.3	3
South Antrim	Neil Kelly	3,203	7.4	4
South Down	Andrew McMurray	1,814	3.6	5
Strangford	Kellie Armstrong	5,693	14.7	2
Upper Bann	Tara Doyle	2,319	4.5	5
West Tyrone	Stephen Donnelly	1,000	2.3	5

== By-elections, 2017–2019 ==
Constituency	Candidate	Votes	%	Position
2018 West Tyrone by-election	Stephen Donnelly	1,130	3.2	5

== 2019 general election ==
Constituency	Candidate	Votes	%	Position
Belfast East	Naomi Long	19,055	44.9	2
Belfast North	Nuala McAllister	4,824	9.8	3
Belfast South	Paula Bradshaw	6,786	14.3	3
Belfast West	Donnamarie Higgins	1,882	4.9	5
East Antrim	Danny Donnelly	10,165	27.3	2
East Londonderry	Chris McCaw	5,921	15.1	4
Fermanagh and South Tyrone	Matthew Beaumont	2,650	5.2	4
Foyle	Rachael Ferguson	1,267	2.7	6
Lagan Valley	Sorcha Eastwood	13,087	28.8	2
Mid Ulster	Mel Boyle	3,526	7.9	4
Newry and Armagh	Jackie Coade	4,211	8.3	4
North Antrim	Patricia O'Lynn	6,231	14.1	3
North Down	Stephen Farry	18,358	45.2	1
South Antrim	John Blair	8,190	19.1	3
South Down	Patrick Brown	6,916	13.9	4
Strangford	Kellie Armstrong	10,634	28.4	2
Upper Bann	Eóin Tennyson	6,433	12.9	3
West Tyrone	Stephen Donnelly	3,979	9.7	4

== 2024 general election ==
Constituency	Candidate	Votes	%	Position
Belfast East	Naomi Long	17,218	40.3	2
Belfast North	Nuala McAllister	4,274	10.6	3
Belfast South and Mid Down	Kate Nicholl	8,839	20.3	2
Belfast West	Eóin Millar	1,077	2.7	6
East Antrim	Danny Donnelly	10,156	25.6	2
East Londonderry	Richard Stewart	3,734	9.0	5
Fermanagh and South Tyrone	Eddie Roofe	2,420	4.7	3
Foyle	Rachael Ferguson	1,268	3.3	7
Lagan Valley	Sorcha Eastwood	18,618	37.9	1
Mid Ulster	Padraic Farrell	2,001	4.4	6
Newry and Armagh	Helena Young	2,692	5.9	6
North Antrim	Sian Mulholland	4,488	10.9	4
North Down	Stephen Farry	13,608	31.4	2
South Antrim	John Blair	4,574	10.7	4
South Down	Andrew McMurray	3,187	7.0	4
Strangford	Michelle Guy	10,428	26.8	2
Upper Bann	Eóin Tennyson	6,322	13.3	3
West Tyrone	Stephen Donnelly	2,287	5.2	6
