= Liberalism in the United Kingdom =

In the United Kingdom, the word liberalism can have any of several meanings. Scholars primarily use the term to refer to classical liberalism. The term can also mean economic liberalism, social liberalism or political liberalism. It can simply refer to the ideology and practises of the historic Liberal Party (1859–1988), or in the contemporary context, of the Liberal Democrats: the successor to the old Liberal Party after it merged with the centrist Social Democratic Party (SDP), with which the Liberals had been in a Britain-wide electoral alliance since shortly after the latter was formed in 1981.

Liberalism can occasionally have the imported American meaning, especially since 2016; however, the pejorative connotation is much weaker in the UK than in the US, and social liberals from both the left and right wing continue to use liberal and illiberal to describe themselves and their opponents, respectively.

== Background ==
Historically, the term referred to the broad liberal political alliance of the nineteenth century, formed by Whigs, Peelites, and radicals. This alliance, which developed into the Liberal Party, dominated politics for much of the Victorian era and during the years before the First World War.

British liberalism is now organised between two schools;

1. the social liberalism of the Liberal Democrats (member LI, ALDE) and their counterpart the Alliance Party of Northern Ireland (member LI, ALDE),
2. and the classical liberalism of the Conservative Party which was adopted in the late 1970s by the late former Prime Minister Margaret Thatcher whose fundamental changes to party policy aligned it to classical liberalism with its commitment to low taxation and economic deregulation. In his speech to the party conference in 2006, David Cameron described the party as a "liberal conservative" party, and in a speech in Bath on Thursday 22 March 2007, he described himself as a "liberal Conservative".

In addition, The Economist magazine, based in Britain and with an international audience, claims to be "liberal" and regrets the split between the two schools.

== Gladstone ==
William Ewart Gladstone (1809–1898) dominated liberalism and the Liberal Party in the late 19th century. He served for 12 years as prime minister, spread over four terms beginning in 1868 and ending in 1894. He also served as Chancellor of the Exchequer four times and between terms was usually the minority leader. The historian H. C. G. Matthew states that Gladstone's chief legacy lay in three areas: his financial policy; his support for Home Rule (devolution) that modified the view of the unitary state of Great Britain; and his idea of a progressive, reforming party broadly based and capable of accommodating and conciliating varying interests, along with his speeches at mass public meetings.

Historian Walter L. Arnstein concludes "Notable as the Gladstonian reforms had been, they had almost all remained within the nineteenth-century Liberal tradition of gradually removing the religious, economic, and political barriers that prevented men of varied creeds and classes from exercising their individual talents in order to improve themselves and their society. As the third quarter of the century drew to a close, the essential bastions of Victorianism still held firm: respectability; a government of aristocrats and gentlemen now influenced not only by middle-class merchants and manufacturers but also by industrious working people; a prosperity that seemed to rest largely on the tenets of laissez-faire economics; and a Britannia that ruled the waves and many a dominion beyond.

Lord Acton wrote in 1880 that he considered Gladstone one "of the three greatest Liberals" (along with Edmund Burke and Lord Macaulay).

In 1909 the Liberal Chancellor David Lloyd George introduced his "People's Budget", the first budget which aimed to redistribute wealth. The Liberal statesman Lord Rosebery ridiculed it by asserting Gladstone would reject it, "Because in his eyes, and in my eyes, too, as his humble disciple, Liberalism and Liberty were cognate terms; they were twin-sisters."

Lloyd George had written in 1913 that the Liberals were "carving the last few columns out of the Gladstonian quarry".

Lloyd George said of Gladstone in 1915: "What a man he was! Head and shoulders above anyone else I have ever seen in the House of Commons. I did not like him much. He hated Nonconformists and Welsh Nonconformists in particular, and he had no real sympathy with the working-classes. But he was far and away the best Parliamentary speaker I have ever heard. He was not so good in exposition."

Writing in 1944 the classical liberal economist Friedrich Hayek said of the change in political attitudes that had occurred since the Great War: "Perhaps nothing shows this change more clearly than that, while there is no lack of sympathetic treatment of Bismarck in contemporary English literature, the name of Gladstone is rarely mentioned by the younger generation without a sneer over his Victorian morality and naive utopianism".

In the latter half of the 20th century Gladstone's economic policies came to be admired by Thatcherite Conservatives. Margaret Thatcher proclaimed in 1983: "We have a duty to make sure that every penny piece we raise in taxation is spent wisely and well. For it is our party which is dedicated to good housekeeping—indeed, I would not mind betting that if Mr Gladstone were alive today he would apply to join the Conservative Party". In 1996, she said: "The kind of Conservatism which he and I...favoured would be best described as 'liberal', in the old-fashioned sense. And I mean the liberalism of Mr Gladstone, not of the latter-day collectivists". That sort of liberalism in the 21st century is termed neoliberalism.

A. J. P. Taylor wrote "William Ewart Gladstone was the greatest political figure of the nineteenth century. I do not mean by that that he was necessarily the greatest statesman, certainly not the most successful. What I mean is that he dominated the scene."

== 1900s: New Liberalism and welfare state ==
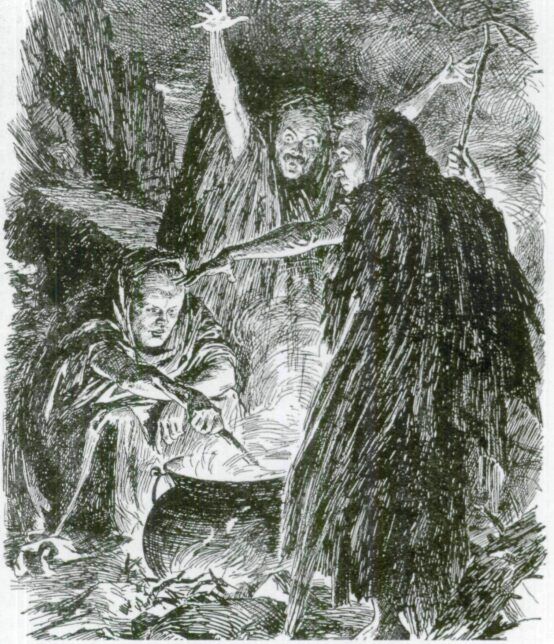
"The constitution in the melting pot" Churchill, Lloyd George and Asquith as Macbeth's witches--PUNCH 1910

When the Liberals lost the 1895 general election, a political crisis shook the Liberal Party. Until that, the Liberal Party adhered to the Gladstonian liberalism, of free markets, low taxation, self-help and freedom of choice, but after the 1895 election many Liberals clamoured for political reform. The reformers' leaders were Thomas Hill Green and Herbert Samuel, that in the Progressive Review of December 1896, said that the classical liberalism was "sapped and raddled", claiming for more state's powers. Samuel's "New Liberalism" called for old-age pensions, labour exchanges (job-placement organizations), and workers' compensation, all prefiguring modern welfare. Other important intellectuals 1906-14 included H. A. L. Fisher, Gilbert Murray, G. M. Trevelyan, Edwin Montagu, Charles Masterman, Alfred Marshall, Arthur Cecil Pigou and young John Maynard Keynes. Socialists meanwhile dominated the Fabian Society.

Key politicians included future prime ministers Henry Campbell-Bannerman, Winston Churchill, H. H. Asquith and David Lloyd George, sceptics of non-interventionism on economy and free market, embraced the New Liberalism. During the Liberal Governments of 1905–1916, the welfare state was introduced to provide provision for lower incomes. In 1908 a pension system was created with old-age pensions for people older than age 70; an income tax was introduced and in 1911 the National Insurance Act was approved. To fund extensive welfare reforms Lloyd George proposed taxes on land ownership and high incomes in the "People's Budget" (1909), which the Conservative-dominated House of Lords rejected. The resulting constitutional crisis was only resolved after two elections in 1910 and the passage of the Parliament Act 1911. His budget was enacted in 1910, and with the National Insurance Act 1911 and other measures helped to establish the modern welfare state. Lloyd George promoted the disestablishment of the Church in Wales, until the outbreak of the First World War in 1914 suspended its implementation. All Liberals were outraged when Conservatives used their majority in the House of Lords to block reform legislation. In the House of Lords, the Liberals had lost most of their members, who in the 1890s "became Conservative in all but name." The government could force the unwilling king to create new Liberal peers, and that threat did prove decisive in the battle for dominance of Commons over Lords in 1911.

However, the Great War of 1914 reduced popular support for the Liberals and the Party split in two factions in 1918: Asquith's supporters and Lloyd George's coupons. While Asquith became Leader of the Opposition, Lloyd George forged a coalition with the Conservative leader Bonar Law, continuing to be Prime Minister with a mostly Conservative base. The Liberal internal conflict caused many reformer and radical voters to join in the Labour Party, while more conservative liberals merged to the Conservatives led by Stanley Baldwin. The 1924 general election signalled the end of the Liberal Party as government force. However, the New Liberalism continued to be the preferred ideology by the Liberal Party, until its dissolution in 1988 when formed the Liberal Democrats.

== 1940–1975: Post-war consensus ==
The post-war consensus began in the 1930s when Liberal intellectuals led by John Maynard Keynes and William Beveridge developed a series of plans that became especially attractive as the wartime government promised a much better post-war Britain and saw the need to engage every sector of society. The foundations of the post-war consensus was the Beveridge Report. This was a report by William Beveridge, a Liberal economist who in 1942 formulated the concept of a more comprehensive welfare state in Great Britain. The report, in shortened terms, aimed to bring widespread reform to the United Kingdom and did so by identifying the "five giants on the road of reconstruction": "Want… Disease, Ignorance, Squalor and Idleness". In the report were labelled a number of recommendations: the appointment of a minister to control all the insurance schemes; a standard weekly payment by people in work as a contribution to the insurance fund; old age pensions, maternity grants, funeral grants, pensions for widows and for people injured at work; a new national health service to be established.

In the period between 1945 and 1970 (consensus years) that unemployment averaged less than 3%. The post-war consensus included a belief in Keynesian economics, a mixed economy with the nationalisation of major industries, the establishment of the National Health Service and the creation of the modern welfare state in Britain. The policies were instituted by all governments (both Labour and Conservative) in the post-war period. The consensus has been held to characterise British politics until the economic crises of the 1970s (see Secondary banking crisis of 1973–1975) which led to the end of the post-war economic boom and the rise of monetarist economics. The roots of his economics, however, stem from critique of the economics of the interwar period depression. Keynes' style of economics encouraged a more active role of the government in order to "manage overall demand so that there was a balance between demand and output".

== 1980s: Neoliberalism ==
With the rise of Margaret Thatcher as Conservative Party leader in the 1975 leadership election ushered in a resurgence of the old 19th-century Gladstone laissez-faire Classical liberal principles. The UK in the 1970s had seen sustained high inflation rates, which were above 20% at the time of the leadership election, high unemployment, and over the winter of 1978–79 there was a series of strikes known as the "Winter of Discontent". Thatcher led her party to victory at the 1979 general election with a manifesto which concentrated on the party's philosophy rather than presenting a "shopping list" of policies. This philosophy became known as Thatcherism and it focused on rejecting the post-war consensus that tolerated or encouraged nationalisation, strong labour unions, heavy regulation, high taxes, and a generous welfare state. Thatcherism was based on social and economic ideas from British and American intellectuals such as Friedrich Hayek and Milton Friedman. Thatcher believed that too much socially democratic-oriented government policy was leading to a long-term decline in the British economy. As a result, her government pursued a programme of Classical liberalism, adopting a free-market approach to public services based on the sale of publicly owned industries and utilities, as well as a reduction in trade union power. She held the belief that the existing trend of unions was bringing economic progress to a standstill by enforcing "wildcat" strikes, keeping wages artificially high and forcing unprofitable industries to stay open.

Thatcherism promoted low inflation, the small state, and free markets through tight control of the money supply, privatisation and constraints on the labour movement. It is a key part of the worldwide Classical liberal movement and as such is often compared with Reaganomics in the United States, Economic Rationalism in Australia and Rogernomics in New Zealand. Thatcherism is also often compared to classical liberalism. Milton Friedman said that "Margaret Thatcher is not in terms of belief a Tory. She is a nineteenth-century Liberal." Thatcher herself stated in 1983: "I would not mind betting that if Mr Gladstone were alive today he would apply to join the Conservative Party". In the 1996 Keith Joseph memorial lecture Thatcher argued that "The kind of Conservatism which he and I ... favoured would be best described as 'liberal', in the old-fashioned sense. And I mean the liberalism of Mr Gladstone, not of the latter day collectivists".

== Timeline of Liberal parties in Great Britain ==
=== From 1859 to 1899 ===
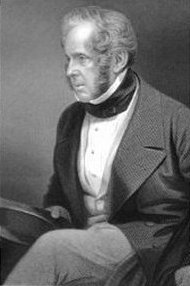
Viscount Palmerston

1859
The Whigs merged with the Peelites and Radicals into the Liberal Party. The Liberal Party win an overall majority in the 1859 general election, winning 356 seats. Henry John Temple, 3rd Viscount Palmerston becomes Prime Minister for the second time.
1865
The Liberal Party win an overall majority in the 1865 general election, winning 369 seats. Lord Palmerston dies in office and is succeeded by John Russell, 1st Earl Russell.

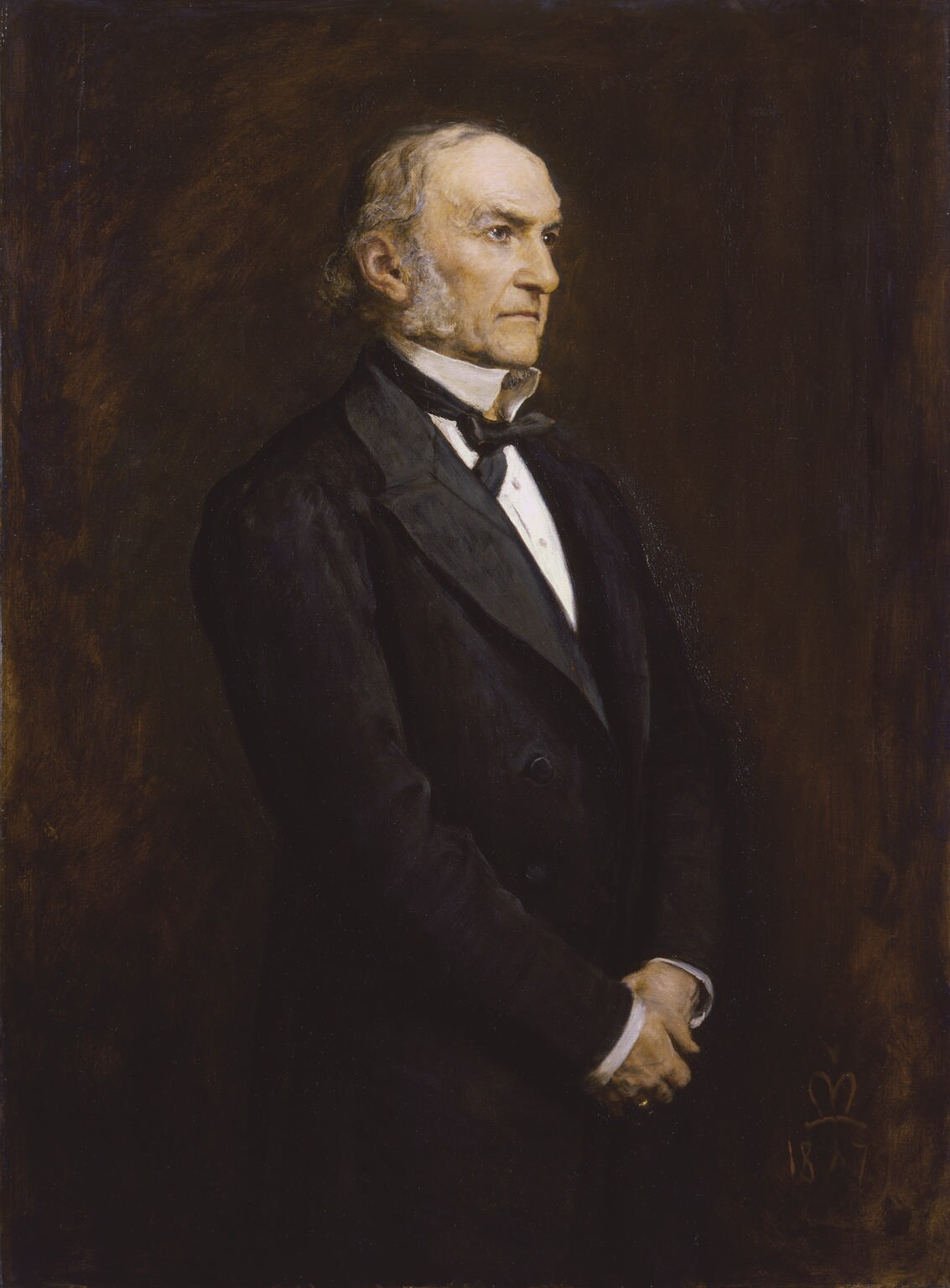
Portrait of William Ewart Gladstone by John Everett Millais, 1879

1868
The Liberal Party win an overall majority in the 1868 general election, winning 387 seats. William Ewart Gladstone becomes Prime Minister.
1874
The Liberal Party lose the 1874 general election, winning 242 seats. A Conservative Government is formed.
1880
The Liberal Party win an overall majority in the 1880 general election, winning 352 seats. Gladstone becomes Prime Minister for the second time.
1885
The Liberal Party gain the most seats (319 seats) in the 1880 general election but fail to win an overall majority with the Irish Nationalists holding the balance of power.
1886
Opponents of Irish Home Rule in the Liberal Party, led by Lord Hartington and Joseph Chamberlain, secede to form the Liberal Unionist Party. The Liberal Party lose the 1886 general election winning 191 seats. The Liberal Unionists win 77 seats and informally co-operate with the newly formed Conservative Government.
1892
The Liberal Party win 272 seats in the 1892 general election and Gladstone becomes Prime Minister for the fourth time forming a minority government dependent on Irish Nationalist support. The Liberal Unionists win 45 seats.
1894
Gladstone resigns as prime minister and his successor is Archibald Primrose, 5th Earl of Rosebery.
1895
The Liberal Party lose the 1895 general election, winning 177 seats. The Liberal Unionists win 71 seats and with the Conservatives form an Unionist Government.

=== 1900 to 1944 ===
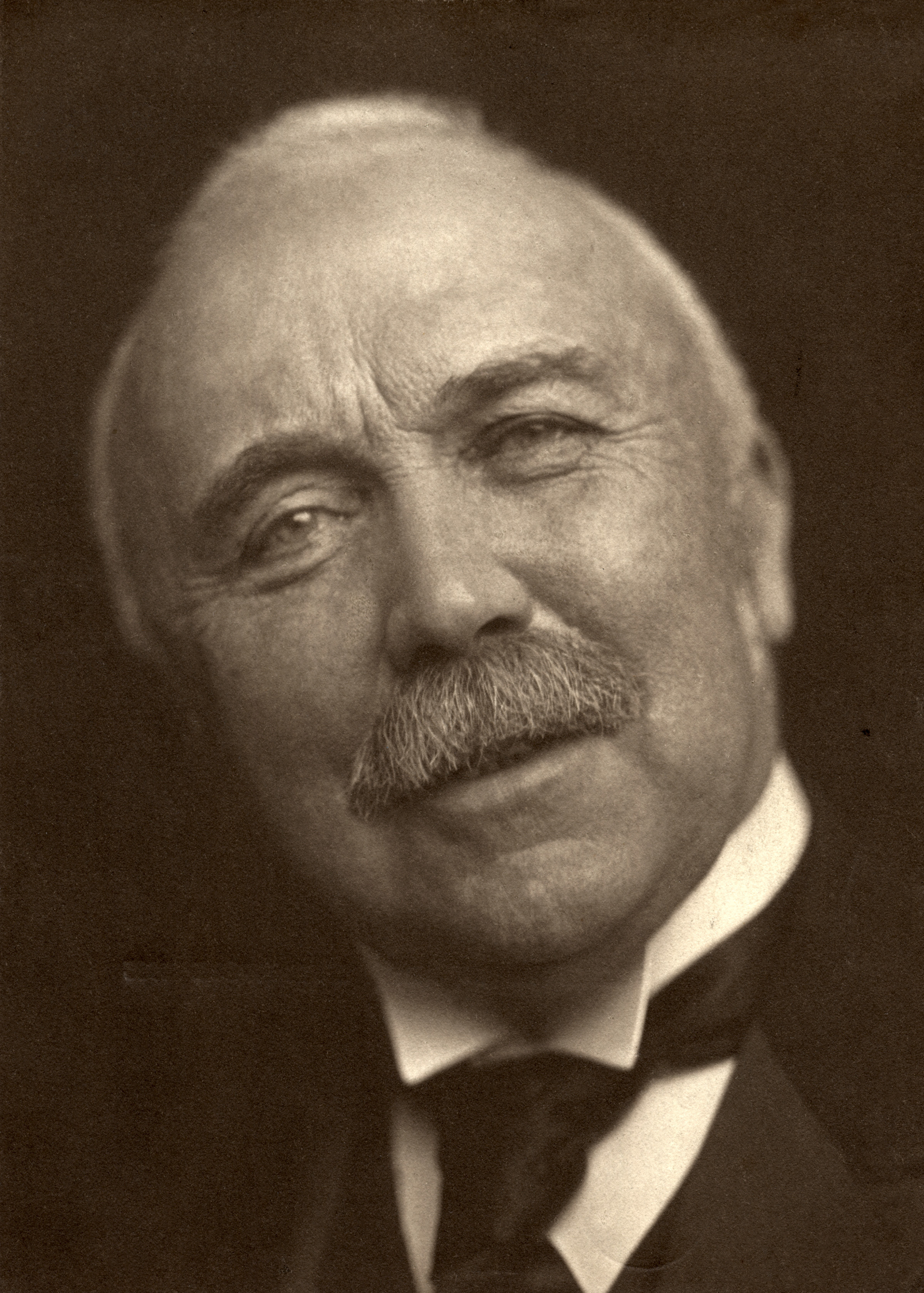
Campbell-Bannerman

1900
The Liberal Party win 184 seats in the 1900 general election. The Liberal Unionists win 68 seats and with the Conservatives form an Unionist Government.
1906
The Liberal Party win an overall majority in the 1906 general election, winning 396 seats. Henry Campbell-Bannerman becomes Prime Minister. This would prove to be the greatest victory for the Liberals and also the last time the Liberal Party won a majority in their own right. The Liberal Unionists win 25 seats.

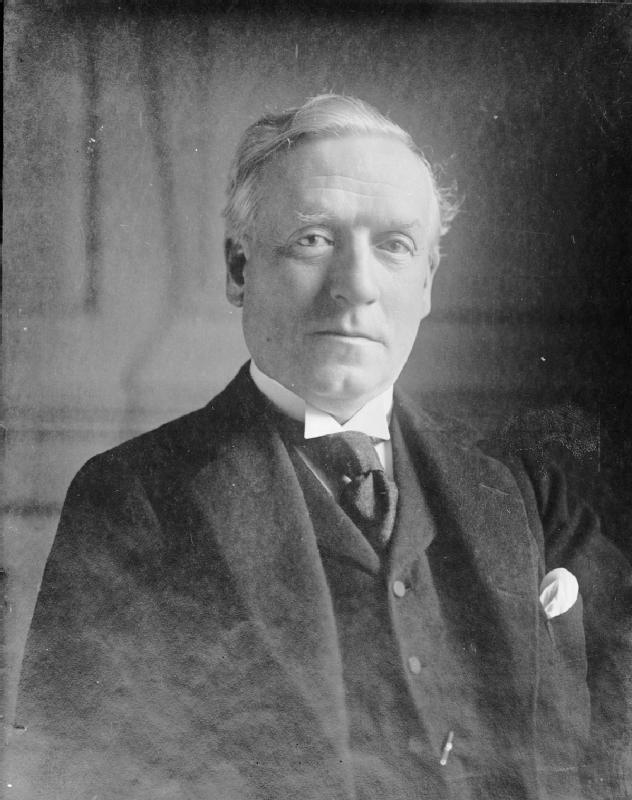
H. H. Asquith

1908
Henry Campbell-Bannerman resigns as prime minister and is succeeded by H. H. Asquith.
1910
The Liberal Party win 274 seats and the Liberal Unionists win 32 seats in January 1910 general election. Asquith forms a government with the support of the Irish Nationalists. Another election is held in December, with the Liberal Party winning 272 seats and the Liberal Unionists winning 36 seats. This would prove the last time the Liberal Party won the highest number of seats in the House of Commons.
1912
The Liberal Unionists merge with the Conservatives to form the present-day Conservative and Unionist Party (known as the Conservative Party).
1915
After several British set backs in the First World War, H. H. Asquith invites the Conservatives to form a war-time coalition government. This marked the end of the last all Liberal government.

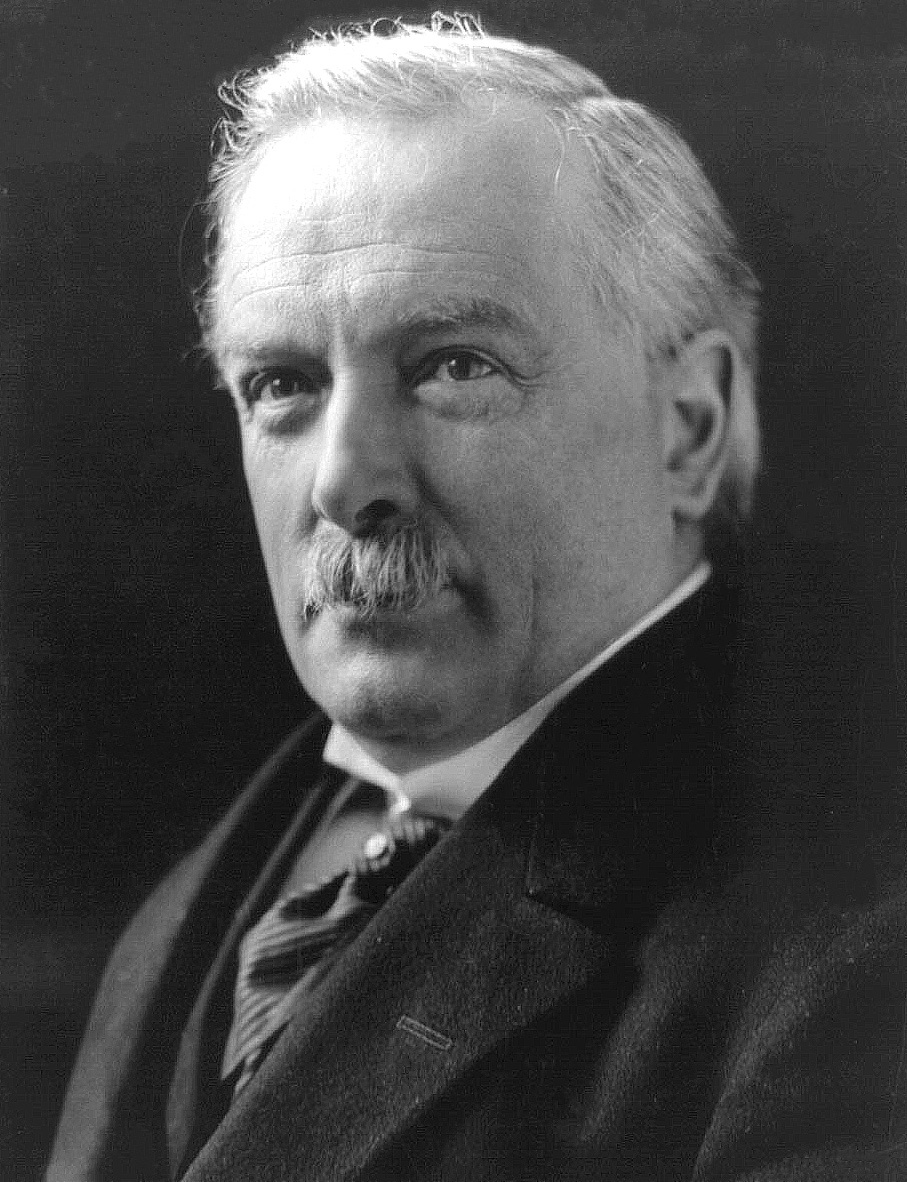
David Lloyd George

1916
H. H. Asquith loses support of the Conservative Party and David Lloyd George becomes Prime Minister. The Liberal Party is now split into two factions: one camp supporting Lloyd George and the other following Asquith.
1918
At the end of the war, a general election was held. The Liberal Party remained split with Lloyd George's Coalition Liberals winning 127 seats and the Asquith led Liberals winning 36 seats. Lloyd George remains Prime Minister with Conservative support.
1922
Lloyd George is forced to resign after loss of support from the Conservatives. In the 1922 general election, the Lloyd George led National Liberals win 53 seats, whilst the Asquith led Liberals win 62 seats.
1923
The National Liberals and the Asquith Liberal factions are re-united as one in support of free trade and the Liberal Party win 158 seats in the 1923 general election. It was the last election in which the Liberals won more than 100 seats.
1924
The Liberal Party are nearly wiped out and win only 40 seats in the 1924 general election.
1929
The Liberal Party win 59 seats in the 1929 general election.
1931
The Liberal Party agrees to join the National Government. After the National Government proposed to fight the 1931 election for a mandate of tariffs, the Liberal Party was split into three groups. A faction, led by John Simon, supported the protectionist government policy and formed the Liberal National Party. Another faction, led by Lloyd George, became the Independent Liberals. The third grouping, the 'official' Liberal Party, was led by Herbert Samuel. In the 1931 general election, the Liberal Nationals won 35 seats, the 'official' Liberals won 33 seats, the Independent Liberals won 4 seats.
1933
The 'official' Liberal Party leave the National Government.
1935
In the 1935 general election, the Liberal Nationals won 33 seats, the 'official' Liberals won 21 seats, the Independent Liberals won 4 seats. Lloyd George's Independent Liberals rejoined with the rest of the 'official' Liberal Party after the general election. The Liberal Nationals remain in the National Government.
1940
Both the Liberal Party and the Liberal National Party join the Churchill Wartime Government.

=== 1945 to present day ===
1945
The Liberal Party win 12 seats, and the Liberal Nationals win 11 seats in the 1945 general election.
1947
The Liberal National Party is renamed National Liberal Party and formally merges with the Conservative Party at constituency level; however some MPs and candidates continue to use the National Liberal label (and variants thereof) for the next twenty years.
1950
The Liberal Party win 9 seats in the 1950 general election. Candidates under the National Liberals banner win 17 seats.
1951
The Liberal Party win 6 seats in the 1951 general election. National Liberals win 19 seats and with the Conservatives form a Conservative Government.
1955
The Liberal Party win 6 seats in the 1955 general election. National Liberals win 21 seats and with the Conservatives form a Conservative Government.
1959
The Liberal Party win 6 seats in the 1951 general election. National Liberals win 19 seats and with the Conservatives form a Conservative Government.
1964
The Liberal Party win 9 seats in the 1964 general election. National Liberals win 6 seats.
1966
The Liberal Party win 12 seats in the 1966 general election. National Liberals win 3 seats.
1968
The National Liberals merge completely with the Conservative Party.
1970
The Liberal Party win 6 seats in the 1970 general election.
1974
The Liberal Party win 14 seats in the February 1974 general election and hold the balance of power. The Liberal Party win 13 seats in the October 1974 general election.
1975
Margaret Thatcher becomes leader of the Conservative Party and the party adopts the classical liberal philosophy which became known as Thatcherism.
1979
The Conservative Party win a landslide victory in the 1979 general election with 339 seats and the Liberal Party win 11 seats.
1981
A faction in the Labour Party break away and form Social Democratic Party (SDP).
1983
An electoral and political alliance between the Liberal Party and SDP is formed. The Liberal Party win 17 seats and the SDP win 6 seats in the 1983 general election. The Conservatives win another landslide victory with 397 seats.
1987
The Conservatives win another victory with 376 seats and the Liberal–SDP alliance win 22 seats in the 1987 general election.
1988
The Liberal Party merge with SDP into the Liberal Democrats. The anti-merger Liberal Party and continuing SDP are formed.
1992
The Conservatives win another victory with 336 seats and new Liberal Democrats win 20 seats in the 1992 general election.
1997
The Conservatives win 165 seats and the Liberal Democrats win 46 seats in the 1997 general election.
2001
The Conservatives win 166 seats and the Liberal Democrats win 52 seats in the 2001 general election.
2002
A splinter group of the Conservative Party, the Pro-Euro Conservative Party merges into the Liberal Democrats.
2005
The Conservatives win 198 seats and the Liberal Democrats win 62 seats in the 2005 general election.
2010
The Conservatives win the 2010 general election with 306 seats and the Liberal Democrats win 57 seats, however with no overall control the two parties form a coalition government.
2015
The Conservatives win the 2015 general election with 330 seats and the coalition is ended; the Liberal Democrats are nearly wiped out and win only 8 seats.
2017
The Conservatives win another victory with 317 seats and the Liberal Democrats win 12 seats in the 2017 general election.
2019
The Conservatives win the 2019 general election with 365 seats and the Liberal Democrats win 11 seats.
2024
The Conservatives win 121 seats and the Liberal Democrats win 72 seats in the 2024 general election. This is the best result for the Liberal Party / Liberal Democrats in 100 years.

== Timeline of Liberal parties in Northern Ireland ==
1956
The Ulster Liberal Association is formed, and is soon renamed as the Ulster Liberal Party.
1969
The Alliance Party of Northern Ireland is formed.
1985
The Ulster Liberal Party fields its last candidate in a Northern Ireland election and subsequently endorses Alliance candidates instead.
1988
A small branch of the Liberal Democrats is formed in Northern Ireland. Like the Ulster Liberal Party, it supports Alliance Party candidates in elections.
2010
The Alliance Party of Northern Ireland win their first seat in the House of Commons of the United Kingdom at the 2010 General Election. Party leader Naomi Long becomes the MP for Belfast East.

=== 2015 ===
The Alliance Party of Northern Ireland lose their 1 seat in the 2015 General Election.

=== 2019 ===
The Alliance Party of Northern Ireland win 1 seat in the 2019 General Election.:

=== 2024 ===
The Alliance Party of Northern Ireland win 1 seat in the 2024 General Election.:

== Liberal leaders ==
School	Party	Leaders
Classical liberalism	Whig	Charles James Fox; 2nd Earl Grey; 2nd Viscount Melbourne
Classical liberalism	Liberal Unionist	8th Duke of Devonshire; Joseph Chamberlain; 15th Earl of Derby; 5th Marquess of Lansdowne
Classical liberalism	Liberal	3rd Viscount Palmerston; 1st Earl Russell; William Ewart Gladstone; 5th Earl of Rosebery
Social liberalism	Liberal	Henry Campbell-Bannerman; H. H. Asquith; David Lloyd George; Herbert Samuel; Archibald Sinclair; Clement Davies; Jo Grimond; Jeremy Thorpe; David Steel
Social liberalism	Liberal Democrats	Paddy Ashdown; Charles Kennedy; Menzies Campbell; Vince Cable; Nick Clegg; Tim Farron; Jo Swinson; Ed Davey
Social liberalism	Alliance	Oliver Napier and Bob Cooper; Phelim O'Neill; Oliver Napier; John Cushnahan; John Alderdice; Seán Neeson; David Ford; Naomi Long
Neoliberalism / Classical liberalism / Conservative liberalism	Conservative	Margaret Thatcher; John Major; William Hague; Iain Duncan Smith; Michael Howard; David Cameron; Theresa May; Boris Johnson; Liz Truss; Rishi Sunak

== Liberal thinkers ==
In the list of liberal theorists the following British thinkers are included:

- Thomas Hobbes (1588–1679)
- John Locke (1632–1704)
- John Trenchard (1662–1723)
- Thomas Gordon (c. 1692–1750)
- David Hume (1711–1776)
- Richard Price (1723–1791)
- Adam Smith (1723–1790)
- Joseph Priestley (1733–1804)
- Thomas Paine (1737–1809)
- Jeremy Bentham (1748–1832)
- David Ricardo (1772–1823)
- James Mill (1773–1836)
- Richard Cobden (1804–1865)
- James Wilson (1805–1860)
- John Stuart Mill (1806–1873)
- Herbert Spencer (1820–1903)
- Thomas Hill Green (1836–1882)
- John A. Hobson (1858–1940)
- Leonard Trelawny Hobhouse (1864–1929)
- William Beveridge (1879–1963)
- John Maynard Keynes (1883–1946)
- Friedrich Hayek (1899–1992)
- Karl Raimund Popper (1902–1994)
- John Hicks (1904–1989)
- Isaiah Berlin (1909–1997)
- Ralf Dahrendorf (1929–2009)
- David Laws (born 1965)

== See also ==
- Civil liberties in the United Kingdom
- History of socialism in Great Britain
- History of the United Kingdom
- List of political parties in the United Kingdom
- Politics of the United Kingdom
- Scottish Liberals for Independence
- Liberalism in Australia
- Liberalism in Canada
- Liberalism in New Zealand
- Liberalism in the United States
