= 1982 Belfast South by-election =

UK parliamentary by-election

- 4 March 1982
- Turnout: 66.2% (▼1.7%)
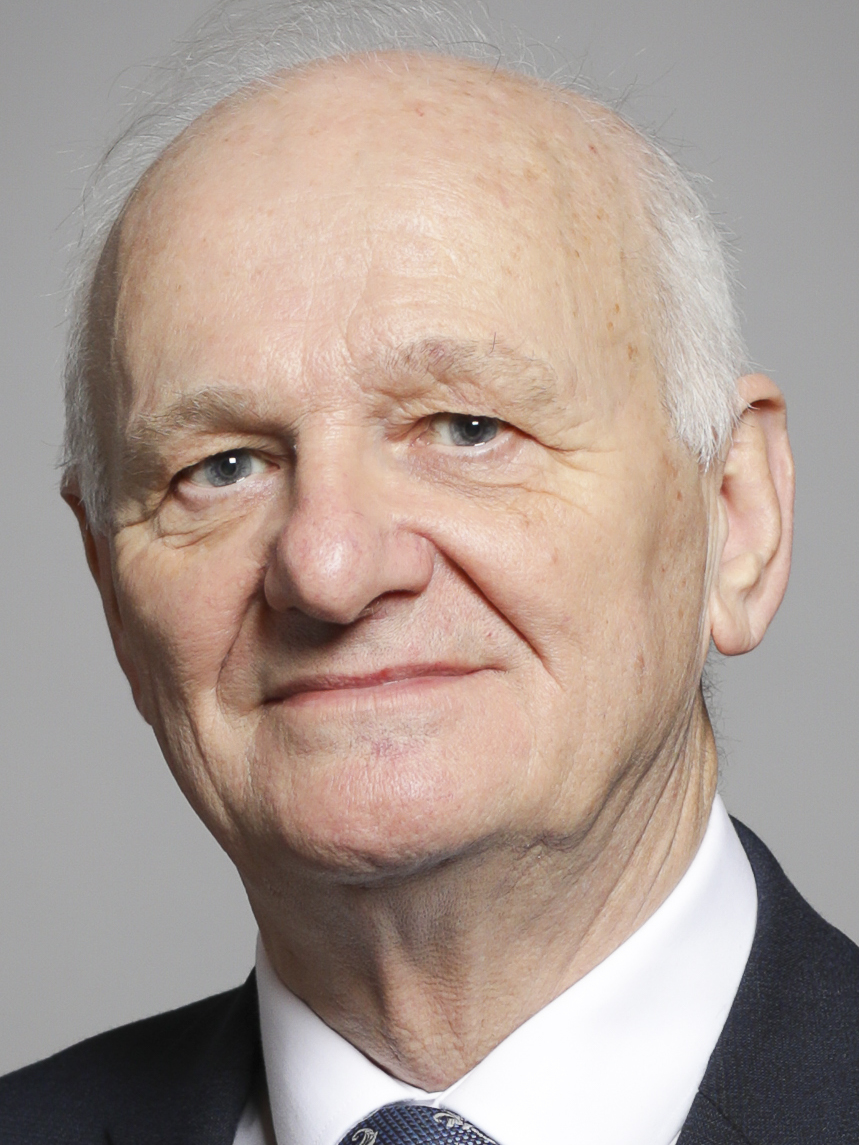

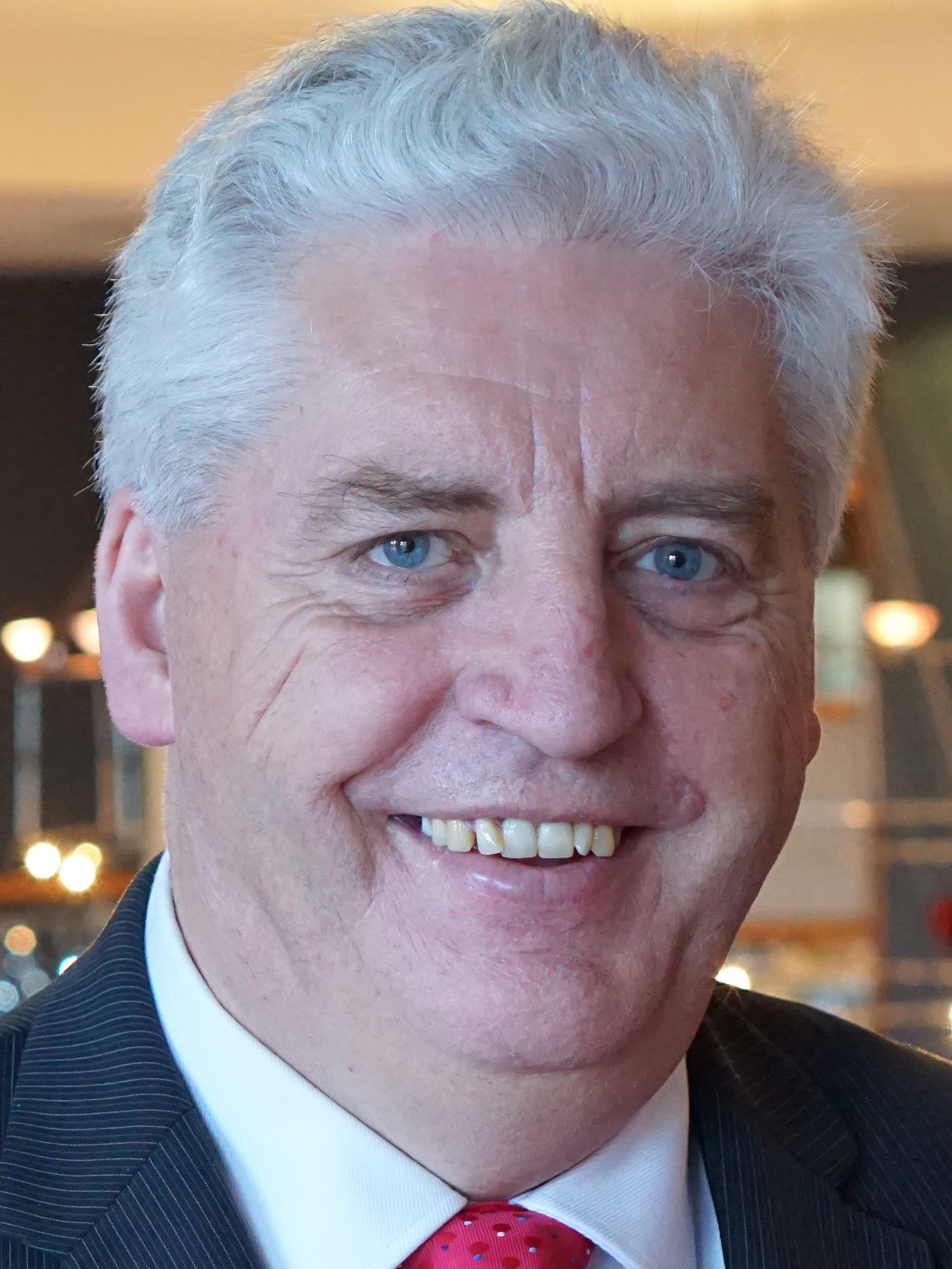
	UUP	APNI
Candidate	Martin Smyth	David Cook
Party	UUP	Alliance
Popular vote	17,123	11,726
Percentage	39.3%	26.9%
Candidate	William McCrea	Alasdair McDonnell
Party	DUP	SDLP
Popular vote	9,818	3,839
Percentage	22.6%	8.8%
MP before election
Robert Bradford
UUP
Subsequent MP
Martin Smyth
UUP

The 1982 Belfast South by-election was held on 4 March 1982 following the murder of Robert Bradford, Ulster Unionist Party (UUP) Member of Parliament for Belfast South.

== Background ==
Bradford had held the seat since the February 1974 general election, initially for the Vanguard Progressive Unionist Party, but since 1978 as a UUP member. He was murdered by the Provisional IRA on 14 November 1981 while holding a political surgery in a community centre in Finaghy. Seanad Éireann passed a motion of sympathy for his death.

While Belfast South was one of the UUP's strongest seats, they had suffered several electoral setbacks, and had lost two other Belfast seats to the Democratic Unionist Party (DUP) at the 1979 general election. The DUP had not contested Belfast South in 1979, so when they announced their intention to contest the by-election, many commentators expected them to win the seat.

The UUP decided to stand Martin Smyth (a minister of the Presbyterian Church in Ireland and former Grand Master of the Orange Order who had been associated with the Vanguard Movement of which Bradford had been a member, although Smyth had never followed Vanguard out of the UUP) over David Trimble and Robert McCartney. The DUP stood William McCrea, a minister of the Free Presbyterian Church of Ulster and member of Magherafelt District Council who had been associated with the Third Force paramilitary group. The other Unionist party to stand in 1979, the Unionist Party of Northern Ireland, had dissolved in Autumn 1981.

South Belfast had also produced many of the Alliance Party of Northern Ireland's best results. Despite the possibility of a split Unionist vote between the UUP and the DUP, a win looked out of their reach, but they hoped to increase their share and retain second place. They stood David Cook, a former Lord Mayor of Belfast.

The nationalist vote in the constituency was low; the main nationalist party, the Social Democratic and Labour Party (SDLP) had never won so much as 10% of the vote. Despite this, the SDLP stood Alasdair McDonnell, a former member of Belfast City Council, hoping to increase their vote. Sinn Féin, while tentatively planning to contest some elections in Northern Ireland, had not yet contested elections at this point and with little background in the constituency, chose not to stand a candidate.

Labour candidates under various descriptions had also traditionally fared well in the constituency, so the United Labour Party, led by Paddy Devlin, stood Brian Caul.

Several other candidates stood. John McMichael represented the Ulster Loyalist Democratic Party, linked to the paramilitary Ulster Defence Association on a platform of Ulster nationalism. Jagat Narain, possibly the first non-white candidate in an election in Northern Ireland, stood as "One Human Family", while Simon Hall-Raleigh stood as "Peace State".

=== Previous election ===
1979 general election: Belfast South
Party	Candidate	Votes	%	±%
UUP	Robert Bradford	28,875	61.7	+2.5
Alliance	Basil Glass	11,745	25.1	+2.1
SDLP	Alasdair McDonnell	3,694	7.9	+3.2
Unionist Party NI	Victor Brennan	1,784	3.8	New
Labour Integrationist	Jeffrey Dudgeon	692	1.5	New
Majority		17,130	36.6	+0.4
Turnout		46,790	67.9	+0.2
Registered electors		68,920		
UUP hold		Swing		

== Result ==
The UUP turned the tide of losses to the DUP; they held the seat with a convincing 39.3% of the vote, and giving them hope for the upcoming 1982 Northern Ireland Assembly election. Alliance slightly increased their vote and held second place. The DUP took a disappointing 22.6% of the vote and managed only third position. The SDLP slightly increased their share, but only to 8.8%. McMichael's policies failed to find favour, but even he was able to beat the rapidly declining figure of Labourism in Northern Ireland; Caul took only 0.7%.

Smyth held the seat for the UUP until he stood down in 2005. Two of the other candidates in the by-election later became MPs: McCrea won Mid Ulster at the 1983 general election. McDonnell stood in South Belfast at each subsequent election, gradually increasing his share of the vote, until in 2005 he unexpectedly won.

1982 Belfast South by-election
Party	Candidate	Votes	%	±%
UUP	Martin Smyth	17,123	39.3	−22.4
Alliance	David Cook	11,726	26.9	+1.8
DUP	William McCrea	9,818	22.6	New
SDLP	Alasdair McDonnell	3,839	8.8	+0.9
Ulster Loyalist Democratic Party	John McMichael	576	1.3	New
United Labour Party	Brian Caul	303	0.7	New
One Human Family	Jagat Narain	137	0.3	New
Peace State	Simon Hall-Raleigh	12	0.03	New
Majority		5,397	12.4	−24.2
Turnout		43,534	66.2	−1.7
Registered electors		66,219		
UUP hold		Swing		
