= Basil Glass =

Northern Irish politician (1926–2005)

Deputy Leader of the Alliance Party of Northern Ireland
- In office 1976–1980
- Leader: Oliver Napier
- Preceded by: Bob Cooper
- Succeeded by: David Cook

Member of Belfast City Council
- In office 18 May 1977 – 20 May 1981
- Preceded by: Patricia Carson
- Succeeded by: Donnell Deeny
- Constituency: Belfast Area A

Member of the Northern Ireland Constitutional Convention for Belfast South
- In office 1975–1976
- Preceded by: Convention established
- Succeeded by: Convention abolished

Alliance Party Chief whip in the Northern Ireland Assembly
- In office 1973–1974
- Leader: Oliver Napier

Member of the Northern Ireland Assembly for Belfast South
- In office 28 June 1973 – 1974
- Preceded by: Assembly created
- Succeeded by: Assembly dissolved

Personal details
- Born: 21 April 1926 County Leitrim, Ireland
- Died: 30 September 2005 (aged 79)
- Party: Alliance (from 1970)
- Other political affiliations: New Ulster Movement (1969-1970)

Basil Glass (21 April 1926 – 30 September 2005) was a Northern Irish solicitor and politician.

== Background ==
Born in County Leitrim, Glass studied at Queen's University Belfast; he qualified as a solicitor in 1950 and became a prominent lawyer. He was elected joint treasurer of the New Ulster Movement, with fellow solicitor Oliver Napier, in 1969. The following year, he became the first Chairman of the Alliance Party of Northern Ireland.

In 1973, Glass became the President of the Alliance Party, and he was elected to the Northern Ireland Assembly for South Belfast, acting as the party's chief whip in the Assembly. At the October 1974 general election he stood for the Westminster seat of South Belfast, taking second position and almost one quarter of the vote.

Glass was again elected to represent South Belfast on the Northern Ireland Constitutional Convention in 1975. In 1976, he became the Alliance Party's deputy leader. In 1977 he was elected to Belfast City Council, a post he held for four years. At the 1979 general election, he slightly improved his performance for the Westminster seat.

Glass narrowly failed to be elected to the Northern Ireland Assembly, 1982, and thereafter scaled back his political activities. In 1987, he was appointed to the post of High Court Bankruptcy Master in Northern Ireland.

He was described by John Wilson QC, Clerk of the Crown for Northern Ireland, as "a gentleman and a scholar."

== Bibliography ==
- Queens University Belfast: Obituaries
- South Belfast 1973–1984
- "Alliance Founder Basil Glass Dies", Belfast Telegraph

Northern Ireland Assembly (1973)
New assembly	Assembly Member for South Belfast; 1973–1974	Assembly abolished
Northern Ireland Constitutional Convention
New convention	Member for South Belfast; 1975–1976	Convention dissolved
Party political offices
Preceded by Bob Cooper	Deputy Leader of the Alliance Party of Northern Ireland; 1976–80	Succeeded by David Cook
