= New Ulster Movement =

- Founded: 1969
- Dissolved: 1978
- Ideology: Reformism; Nonsectarianism
- Political position: Centre

The New Ulster Movement (NUM) was a political pressure group in Northern Ireland which aimed to promote moderate and non-sectarian policies and to help candidates who supported Terence O'Neill, the Northern Ireland Prime Minister, in the election on 24 February 1969 which saw a split between candidates of the ruling Ulster Unionist Party.

The organisation was established in early 1969 under the Chairmanship of Brian Walker, and soon had a membership of around 8,000 people. Later in the year, Oliver Napier of the Ulster Liberal Party and Bob Cooper, formerly of the Ulster Unionist Party, were appointed as joint chairmen of its political committee.

Napier and Cooper wished to establish a new political party, a position which was strongly opposed by Walker. A meeting of the NUM was held on 30 December 1969 to decide on the way forward, and a committee was elected to investigate the feasibility of launching a new party at Easter in 1970.

David Corkey, a member of the NUM, stood as an independent candidate in a by-election in South Antrim. He received 25.7% of the votes cast, and this helped build enthusiasm for the party.

Napier and Cooper launched the Alliance Party of Northern Ireland (APNI) on 21 April 1970, and used their access to the membership lists of the NUM to canvass for party members. Napier later estimated that 95–99% of NUM members left to join APNI, including eleven executive members.

In October, the NUM rewrote its constitution to prevent it from intervening in elections, and redefined itself as a think tank. It dissolved in 1978.
