= Scottish Liberals for Independence =

Pro-Scottish independence group

Scottish Liberals for Independence Scots Leeberals for Unthirldom Libearalaich na h-Alba airson Neo-eisimeileachd
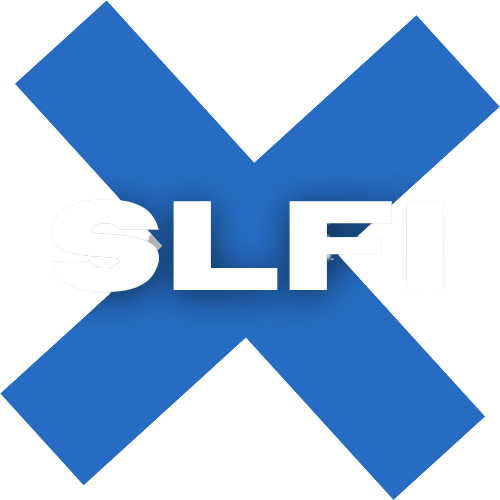
- Abbreviation: SLFI
- Leader: Cameron Greer; Jake Stevenson
- Founded: 29 August 2022
- Split from: Liberal Democrats
- Ideology: Scottish independence Scottish republicanism Liberalism; Progressivism; Pro-Europeanism

Website
- https://scotlibs4indy.wixsite.com/scotlibs4indy

Scottish Liberals for Independence (SLFI; Scots: Scots Leeberals for Unthirldom, Scottish Gaelic: Libearalaich na h-Alba airson Neo-eisimeileach) was a progressive, liberal organisation which campaigned for Scottish independence. The organisation was originally set up to represent pro-independence members within the Liberal Democrats. The group later decided to drop attempts to affiliate with the party; instead, they opened membership to anyone that agreed with their policies.

== History ==
SLFI was founded on 29 August 2022 by Cameron Greer and Jake Stevenson who were members of the Liberal Democrats that originally backed Scotland remaining as part of the United Kingdom. After appealing to set up a pro-independence group within the Liberal Democrats, Greer and Stevenson decided to form the group independently of the party and become a campaign group for support Scottish independence.

== Policies and views ==
SLFI supports Scotland becoming an independent republic in the European Union and that it should adopt its own currency straight after independence and that a universal basic income (UBI) should also be introduced afterwards. Alongside their policies surrounding independence SLFI also advocate the safeguarding of transgender rights.
