= Alliance Party of Northern Ireland =

Political party

- Abbreviation: APNI
- Leader: Naomi Long MLA
- Deputy Leader: Eóin Tennyson
- President: David Alderdice
- Chairperson: Michelle Guy MLA
- Founders: Oliver Napier; Bob Cooper; John Ferguson; Basil Glass
- Founded: 21 April 1970; 56 years ago
- Preceded by: Ulster Liberal Party; New Ulster Movement
- Headquarters: 7 Farmley Road; Newtownabbey; BT36 7TY
- Youth wing: Alliance Youth
- LGBT wing: Alliance LGBT+
- Ideology: Liberalism; Social liberalism; Nonsectarianism; Pro-Europeanism
- Political position: Centre to centre-left
- European affiliation: Alliance of Liberals and Democrats for Europe (associate)
- International affiliation: Liberal International
- Great Britain affiliate: Liberal Democrats
- Colours: Yellow; Black
- House of Commons (NI seats): 1 / 18
- House of Lords (Note: Former party leader John Alderdice sits in the House of Lords with the Liberal Democrats.): 0 / 796
- NI Assembly: 17 / 90
- Councillors in Northern Ireland: 65 / 462
- Councils led in Northern Ireland: 0 / 11

Website
- allianceparty.org

The Alliance Party of Northern Ireland (APNI), or simply Alliance, is a liberal and centrist political party in Northern Ireland. Following the 2022 Northern Ireland Assembly election, it was the third-largest party in the Northern Ireland Assembly, holding seventeen seats. It achieved third place in first preference votes in the 2019 European Parliament election and polled third-highest regionally at the 2019 UK general election. The party won one of the three Northern Ireland seats in the European Parliament, and one seat, North Down, in the House of Commons, the lower house of the Parliament of the United Kingdom.

Founded in 1970 from the New Ulster Movement, the Alliance Party originally represented moderate and non-sectarian unionism. However, over time, particularly in the 1990s, it moved towards neutrality on the Union, and came to represent wider liberal and non-sectarian concerns. It supports the Good Friday Agreement but maintains a desire for the reform of the political system towards a non-sectarian future and, in the Northern Ireland Assembly, it is designated as neither Unionist nor Irish nationalist, but "Other" or "United Community".

The Alliance Party won its first seat in the UK House of Commons in the 2010 general election, unseating the former East Belfast MP Peter Robinson, First Minister of Northern Ireland and leader of the Democratic Unionist Party (DUP). Naomi Long was the first MP from the Alliance Party since Stratton Mills, who joined the party from the Ulster Unionist Party (UUP) in 1973. However, the DUP regained the seat at the 2015 general election, following an electoral pact with the UUP. In the 2019 general election, Alliance regained its presence in the House of Commons when Stephen Farry won the North Down seat vacated by the independent unionist, Sylvia Hermon. Earlier that year, the party's leader, Naomi Long, won the party's first seat in the European Parliament in the 2019 European Parliament election (the last before Brexit). Under Long's leadership, the Alliance Party exceeded expectations in the 2022 Northern Ireland Assembly election and gained numerous seats in the Northern Ireland Assembly.

The Alliance Party is a member of Liberal International and the Alliance of Liberals and Democrats for Europe, and is aligned with the Liberal Democrats in Great Britain.

== History ==
=== Early growth and the 1974 Northern Ireland Executive ===
The party was formed in April 1970 as an alternative to the established parties. In the context of a rapidly worsening political crisis, it aimed not only to present an alternative to what they perceived as sectarian parties and expressly aimed to act as a bridge between the Protestant and Catholic sections of the community and heal the divisions in Northern Ireland society. The Party's founding principles were expressly in favour of Northern Ireland remaining part of the United Kingdom, although, in contrast to other unionist parties, that was expressed in socio-economic rather than ethnic terms.

On 5 February 1973, prior to the 1973 Northern Ireland border poll, the party's chairman, Jim Hendron, stated that: "Support for the position of Northern Ireland as an integral part of the United Kingdom is a fundamental principle of the Alliance Party, not only for economic reasons but also because we firmly believe that a peaceful solution to our present tragic problems is only possible within a United Kingdom context. Either a Sinn Fein all-Ireland republic or a Vanguard-style Ulster republic would lead to disaster for all our people."

The party's prominence increased in 1972 when three members of the Northern Ireland House of Commons defected to Alliance. The MPs were drawn from across Northern Ireland's political divide and included Bertie McConnell, an independent Unionist, the Ulster Unionist Phelim O'Neill and Tom Gormley who sat as an independent Nationalist. In 1973, Lord Dunleath joined the party in the House of Lords. Stratton Mills, who had been elected as an Ulster Unionist/Conservative MP at Westminster for North Belfast also joined that year, becoming the party's sole MP between 1973 and 1974 and did not have another MP until 2010. Its first electoral challenge was the District Council elections of May 1973 when they managed to win 13.6% of the votes cast.

In the elections to the Northern Ireland Assembly, which followed the Sunningdale Agreement, the party polled 9.2% and won eight seats. After the elections, Alliance entered the power sharing Northern Ireland Executive. Oliver Napier became Legal Minister and Head of the Office of Law Reform and Bob Cooper took the junior role of Minister for Manpower Services.

In its manifesto for the elections to the Northern Ireland Constitutional Convention in 1975, the Alliance Party stated "Alliance supports the constitutional position of Northern Ireland as an integral part of the United Kingdom. We know that this belief is shared by the overwhelming majority of our people and that provocative debate about it has been the primary cause of all our most fundamental troubles. The link is in the best economic and social interests of all the people of Northern Ireland, and we will maintain that only the people of Northern Ireland have the right to decide any change by voting in a referendum."

Alliance's vote increased significantly in the 1977 local elections, when it obtained 14.4% of the vote and had 74 councillors elected. In 1979, Party leader Oliver Napier came closer than Alliance had previously come to electing a Westminster MP, polling just 928 votes short of Peter Robinson's winning total in East Belfast, albeit placing third in a three-way marginal.

=== Stabilisation and decline ===
Alliance was seriously damaged by the 1981 Irish hunger strike, which deeply polarised Northern Ireland politics, and led to the emergence of Sinn Féin as a serious political force. The party supported the 1985 Anglo-Irish Agreement, and despite claims that this would fatally damage its soft unionist support, Alliance rebounded to pick up 10.0% of the vote in Northern Ireland in the 1987 United Kingdom general election.

John Alderdice polled 32.0% of the vote in East Belfast, while Alliance came within 15,000 votes of both the Democratic Unionist Party and Sinn Féin across Northern Ireland. He would go on to become leader after the election, replacing John Cushnahan. In 1996 Alderdice accepted a peerage, becoming the Alliance Party's only representation in Parliament. Lord Alderdice took the Liberal Democrat whip on wider UK and European issues but remained free from the whip's control on issues impacting Northern Ireland.

In 1988, in Alliance's keynote post-Anglo Irish Agreement document, Governing with Consent, Alderdice called for a devolved power-sharing government. Throughout the late 1980s and early 1990s, Alliance's vote stabilised at between 7% and 10%. After the IRA and loyalist ceasefires in 1994, Alliance became the first non-nationalist party to enter into talks with Sinn Féin, as an active participant in the Northern Ireland peace process negotiations leading to the Good Friday Agreement, which it strongly supported. Alliance polled poorly in the 1996 elections for the Northern Ireland Forum, and the 1998 election for the Northern Ireland Assembly winning around 6.5% of the vote each time. This did enable the party to win six seats in the Assembly, although this was somewhat of a let-down given that it had been expected to do much better.

=== The Good Friday Agreement era ===
==== 1998–2004 ====
John Alderdice resigned as party leader in 1998 to take up the post of the Assembly's Presiding Officer. He was replaced by Seán Neeson, who himself resigned as party leader in September 2001. Neeson was replaced by David Ford, a member of the Assembly for South Antrim.

It was predicted that Alliance would suffer electorally as a new centrist challenger established itself in Northern Irish politics, the Northern Ireland Women's Coalition. Another problem for the APNI was that the rules of the Assembly require major votes (such as the election of the First Minister and deputy First Minister) to have the support of both a majority of unionist and nationalist MLAs, thus diminishing the importance of parties such as Alliance which are not aligned to either of these two blocs.

In the 2003 Assembly elections, Alliance held all their seats, while the Women's Coalition lost both of theirs. Alliance's vote fell to just 3.7%. In the European Parliament Elections in 2004, Alliance gave strong support to Independent candidate John Gilliland who polled 6.6% of the vote, the highest for a non-communal candidate in a European election since 1979. In the early years of the peace process, the centre ground was relentlessly squeezed in Northern Ireland politics. The support for Gilliland's candidature, which was also supported by parties such as the Workers' Party and Northern Ireland Conservatives, reflected a desire to reunite the fragmented and weakened non-communal bloc in Northern Ireland politics.

==== 2004–2016 ====
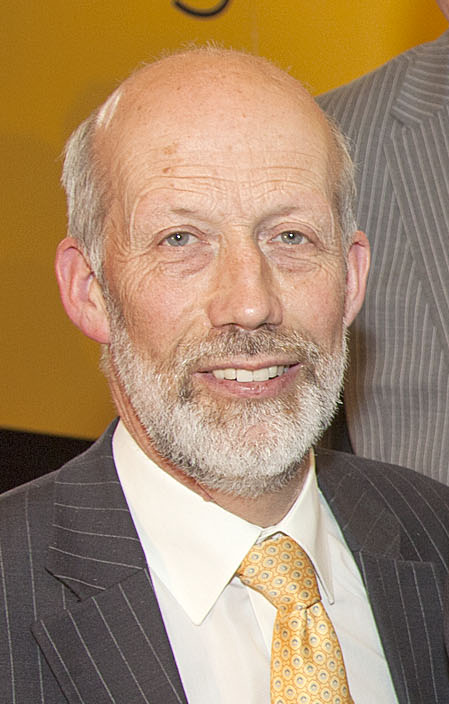
David Ford led the Alliance between 2001 and 2016.

In the 5 May 2005 United Kingdom general election, they contested 12 seats and polled 3.9% of the vote. In the simultaneous elections to Northern Ireland's local authorities, they polled 5.0% of first preference votes and had 30 Councillors elected, a gain of two seats relative to the previous elections.

The 2006–2007 period saw some signs of an Alliance upturn, topping the poll and gaining a seat in a by-election for Coleraine Borough Council.

In the 2007 Northern Ireland Assembly elections, Alliance put in a strong media campaign and polled 5.2%, up from 3.6% in the previous election and gaining a seat in Belfast South following the successful candidature of Anna Lo, the first ethnic Chinese public representative in a national assembly anywhere in Western Europe. In an election cycle where many pundits had predicted that the Alliance Party would struggle to hold on to the six seats it won in the 2003 election, the party pulled off a credible performance which included Deputy Leader Naomi Long doubling her share of the vote in Belfast East.

In 2008, during the deadlock between Sinn Féin and the DUP over the devolution of policing, the two parties came to an agreement that the Minister of Justice would not come from either party. The Alliance Party was the obvious choice but party leader David Ford said "it's a very definite and a very emphatic no". Ford further stated, "this executive is incompetent, it's time they got on with doing the job that they were set up to do". Following further negotiations, Ford assumed office on 12 April 2010.

At the 2009 European elections, Alliance candidate Ian Parsley achieved the party's best European election vote share in 30 years with 5.5% of the vote.

In the 2010 general election, the party won its first seat in Westminster, with Naomi Long taking the seat of sitting First Minister Peter Robinson. The 2011 Northern Ireland Assembly Election resulted in eight Assembly members being returned with a gain in Belfast East. It overtook the UUP on Belfast City Council.

In a poll conducted in November 2012, Alliance (on 11.6%) overtook the UUP (11.4%) for the first time.

During the 2016 elections to the Assembly, in spite of initially confident predications from David Ford that Alliance would see a surplus of up to 11 seats, the party's share of the popular vote stagnated somewhat, from 7.7% in 2011 to 7.0%. Ultimately, its 8 MLAs from their original respective constituencies were returned to Stormont for the fifth Assembly term. Ford later resigned as Alliance Party leader on 6 October 2016, on his 15th anniversary as leader of the party.

=== 2016–2019: Opposing Brexit ===
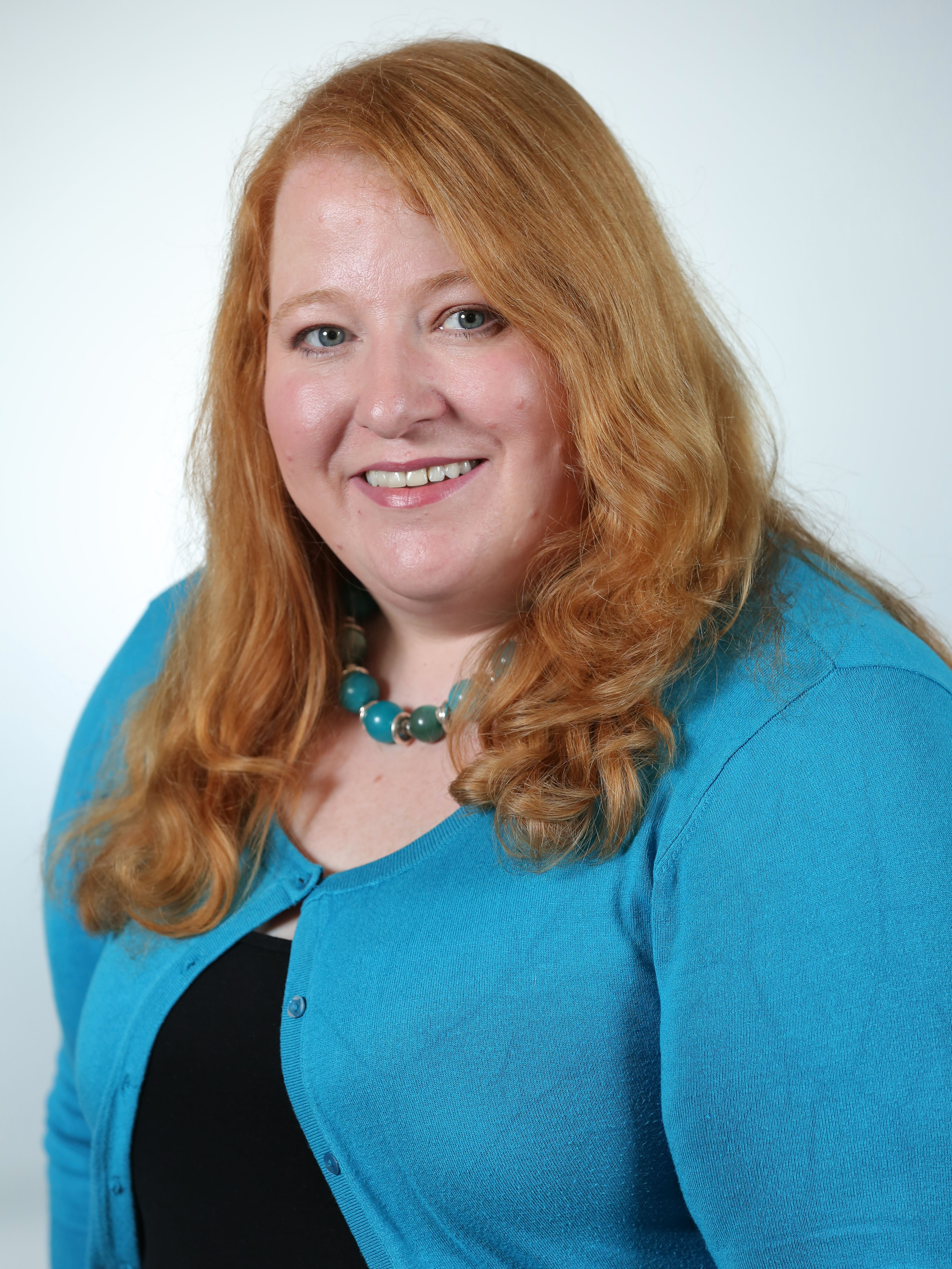
Naomi Long

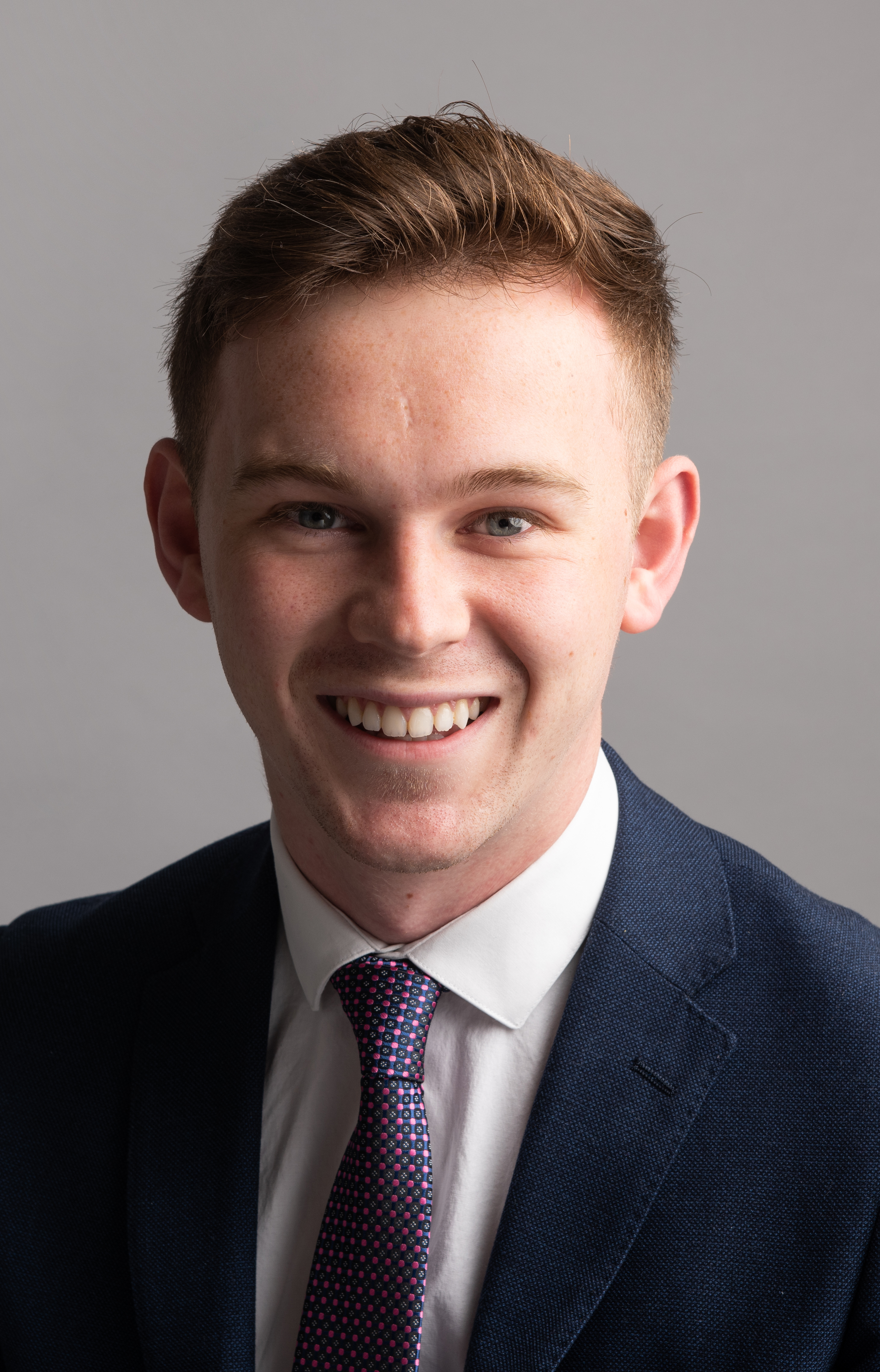
Eóin Tennyson

Long and Tennyson serve as current Alliance Leader and Deputy Leader

On 26 October 2016, Naomi Long officially became the new leader of the Alliance Party. In the snap 2017 Assembly election, Alliance increased its vote share to 9.1% and retained all eight of their MLA seats in a reduced Assembly. For the 2017 general election, the party advocated a confirmatory referendum on the Brexit withdrawal agreement and remaining in the European Single Market. In April 2018, the party joined the Alliance of Liberals and Democrats for Europe Party as an associate member.

Alliance increased its vote share by 5 percentage points in the 2019 local elections and broke out of its traditional Greater Belfast heartlands by taking seats on Armagh, Banbridge and Craigavon Borough Council and Derry City & Strabane District Council where the party had not previously been represented. During the election campaign, the party had urged a break from "orange and green politics" and was vocal in its opposition to Brexit using the slogan "Demand Better".

In the 2019 European election, Naomi Long became the Alliance Party's first ever MEP, receiving the second of three seats allocated to Northern Ireland and securing the best ever result for Alliance with 18.5% of first-preference votes.

The party greatly increased its vote share at the 2019 general election, from 7.9% to 16.8% of Northern Ireland, over-taking the SDLP and UUP to come third overall. The party re-gained a seat in the House of Commons (North Down, previously held by the retiring independent Sylvia Hermon), and was second in another four constituencies.

=== 2020–present: COVID-19 pandemic and subsequent elections ===
Long became Stormont's justice minister in January 2020, holding the position throughout the COVID-19 pandemic. In March 2022, Long told the Alliance Party conference in Belfast that the DUP and Sinn Féin were "addicted to crisis and conflict", and hoped that her party could bring an end to the "binary system" at Stormont.

The Alliance Party fought the 2022 Northern Ireland Assembly election on a platform of reforming the Stormont institutions, health transformation, integrated education, a Green New Deal and tackling paramilitarism. Alliance would go on to win the third highest number of seats in the Northern Ireland Assembly, 4.5% more of the vote than they did in the 2017 election and also gaining nine seats. In all, the 2022 election saw the party win 17 seats in the Northern Ireland Assembly, more than double the number of seats than what they previously had after the 2017 Northern Ireland Assembly election.

The 2023 Northern Ireland local elections were, in Long's own words, "a mixed bag"; however, the party still gained 14 seats overall, increasing its councillor total to 67.

Stephen Farry lost his seat at Westminster in the 2024 United Kingdom general election, but the party continues to have one MP: Sorcha Eastwood won a seat for Alliance in Lagan Valley.

== Ideology and policies ==
Over the past 40 years (and particularly since the mid-1990s), Alliance's political philosophy has veered away from non-sectarian unionism towards a more liberal, neutral position on the question of either a united Ireland or continued union with Great Britain. Alliance supports the Good Friday Agreement as a basis that can be used to manage the conflict whilst working to ultimately create a non-sectarian political system for Northern Ireland. It believes that the consociational power-sharing structure established by the agreement may not be capable of providing long-term stability, citing various reservations such as the entrenchment of pre-existing divisions as well as the inability to adapt to demographic changes. Its 2022 manifesto stated "Alliance supports the Good Friday Agreement, and endorses its underlying principles, its structures, and its interlocking relationships. However, we have always supported reform of the structures of government and, in light of recent developments, the case for reform is stronger than ever."

The Alliance Party was founded by moderate Unionists in the New Ulster Movement in April 1970 in response to the emergence of the Troubles. As Alliance viewed the situation, the major problem of Northern Ireland was the division between Protestants and Catholics. It contended that the turmoil had its origins in that division and not in the partition of Ireland.

The distinguishing feature of Alliance is its belief in the legitimacy of a distinctive Northern Irish community, one that has more in common than what divides it, with most inhabitants speaking a common language, sharing some form of Christianity, and not separated by distinguishable racial or physical characteristics. Alliance does not view unionism and nationalism as distinct communities, but as "political positions". Furthermore, Alliance sees identity as an individual matter, one that is fluid and open to change over time. In a 2014 document, the Alliance stated:

We acknowledge that people identify with and belong to religious, ethnic, cultural and regional communities. These however are not permanent or stable but are open and fluid. People...can belong to many groups, have a complex identity, and have loyalties to different structures and levels of government.

Because of this stance, Alliance is at times referred to as representing a "third tradition" or "third force" within Northern Irish politics that is outside of Nationalism and Unionism.

As Alliance have moved to an ideologically liberal perspective, and Northern Ireland society has become more diverse, support for diversity has become a key Alliance platform, with Anna Lo MLA elected as the first ethnically East Asian parliamentarian in Northern Ireland and the party promoting a number of openly gay spokespeople. In July 2005, Seamus Close, then an MLA and Lisburn councillor for the party and its former deputy leader, proposed that the Lisburn Council deny gay couples access to the council's designated wedding facility if they were seeking a civil partnership under the Civil Partnership Act 2004. The council adopted his recommendation, although it was later reversed on legal advice. His position ran against Alliance policy, which had been strongly supportive of the introduction of civil partnership laws, and he was publicly criticised by other senior party members. The then party chair and future MLA, Lisburn councillor Trevor Lunn, who had also opposed the use of the wedding facility for civil partnerships, resigned as chair later that year, stating that "I always thought the Alliance Party was a broad enough church that we could support some difference of opinion. But it appears that in terms of equality issues, that we just can't." The party's liberal ideology has also pushed the party towards a general favourable position on abortion, immigration and LGBT rights. The party also supports an integrated education system where Catholics and Protestants are educated together, improving healthcare in Northern Ireland, and legislating a Green New Deal.

=== Constitutional issues and border poll ===
The Alliance Party maintains a position of neutrality on the constitutional question of whether Northern Ireland should remain part of the United Kingdom or join a united Ireland, advocating instead for cross-community consent and good governance within the existing settlement.

On multiple occasions, party leader Naomi Long has called on the Secretary of State for Northern Ireland to clarify the criteria that would lead to the holding of a border poll on Irish unity. Long stated that the absence of clear guidance on when such a poll would be called risks turning “every single election [into] a kind of proxy for a border poll.” She has argued that greater transparency would help ensure public confidence in the decision-making process regarding Northern Ireland’s constitutional status.

== Electoral performance and the regionalisation of Alliance's vote ==
Northern Ireland Council Seats
- Antrim and Newtownabbey: 8 / 40
- Armagh, Banbridge and Craigavon: 4 / 41
- Belfast City: 11 / 60
- Causeway Coast and Glens: 5 / 40
- Derry and Strabane: 0 / 40
- Fermanagh and Omagh: 2 / 40
- Lisburn and Castlereagh: 13 / 40
- Mid and East Antrim: 7 / 40
- Mid Ulster: 0 / 40
- Newry, Mourne and Down: 5 / 41
- North Down and Ards: 12 / 40

One trend over time with Alliance's vote is that in contrast to 1973, when Alliance support was dispersed across Northern Ireland, Alliance has increasingly polled best in the Greater Belfast hinterland. For example, the 1977 elections, while representing an overall increase for Alliance, masked a sharp decline in vote share in many Western councils. In the 12 councils covering the former counties of Londonderry, Tyrone, Armagh and Fermanagh their vote only rose in Omagh, it remained static in Magherafelt and fell in the other ten councils (these being Fermanagh, Dungannon, Cookstown, Strabane, Londonderry, Limavady, Coleraine, Newry & Mourne, Armagh and Craigavon.) Overall in these 12 councils the number of Alliance councillors fell from 18 in 1973 to ten in 1977. In contrast, in the rest of the region Alliance increased their number of councillors from 45 to 60.

The party won eight council seats across Belfast in 1985. Although that has now recovered to six (from three in 2001), the six are entirely from South and East Belfast. Both seats in the Falls Road area of West Belfast were lost after the death and resignation of their councillors there in 1987 while their seat in North Belfast was lost in 1993, regained four years later and lost again in 2001. In the neighbouring areas of Dunmurry Cross (Twinbrook/Dunmurry) and Macedon (Rathcoole) Alliance lost their councillors in 1989 and 1994 respectively; on the other hand, the party won three out of seven seats in Victoria in 2011, the first time since 1977 that the party had won three council seats in the same electoral area.

By 2005, the party had councillors in only half of Northern Ireland's 18 constituencies. However, this rose to 13 in 2011 after gains in Coleraine, Craigavon, Down and elsewhere. Having had around 30 councillors for a decade, the party won 44 seats in 2011. In the 2010 elections, the Alliance gained the Westminster seat of Belfast East, and gained a 22.6% swing there; in 2011 it re-emphasised that result, winning two out of the six MLA seats available.

In 2014, the party gained one seat in the Belfast Council area, this coming in North Belfast when Nuala McAllister ousted Sinn Féin. Outside of the capital the party's vote held up, and with the exception of Patrick Brown winning in Rowallane, there were no outstanding results.

In the 2015 Westminster elections, the party directed their resources at retaining the East Belfast seat Naomi Long had gained from the DUP in 2010. The party lost the seat to the DUP by 2,500 votes, after a Unionist pact, whilst the Alliance vote increased by 6% across the constituency.

The 2019 Northern Ireland local elections saw a substantial increase in the Alliance vote and resulted in 53 councillors being elected, with the only council not having any Alliance representation being in Mid Ulster. The balance of power in the capital of Belfast, is held by the party after an increase to 10 seats and becoming the 3rd party, at Belfast City Hall.

Several Alliance members have held the position of Lord Mayor of Belfast, including Long and (from 2021 to 2022), Kate Nicholl.

=== Vote share by district council (1973–2011) ===
	1973	1977	1981	1985	1989	1993	1997	2001	2005	2011
Antrim	16.1	16.9	10.9	7.6	7.0	8.5	8.2	5.5	6.9	11.3
Ards	14.8	20.8	12.3	12.4	18.8	23.4	21.1	16.7	14.1	18.2
Armagh	7.8	6.4					0.7			
Ballymena	6.4	5.2			6.1	5.4	2.0	1.1	1.5	1.7
Ballymoney	7.7	8.3	8.1	2.6		2.0				
Banbridge	5.7	6.2	4.6	1.6	2.2	1.8	5.1	2.0	4.5	4.9
Belfast	13.4	18.6	13.2	11.5	10.9	11.2	9.2	6.8	6.8	12.6
Carrickfergus	22.3	30.0	21.8	24.9	27.1	32.2	27.4	23.5	23.2	25.1
Castlereagh	22.1	32.5	21.1	18.8	21.5	21.9	18.7	15.2	16.2	25.2
Coleraine	13.2	10.6	6.3	6.2	7.9	11.8	9.2	6.4	4.7	8.8
Cookstown	6.3	5.2								0.6
Craigavon	16.0	11.3	4.1	4.3	5.8	6.2	4.5	1.6	2.4	3.4
Derry	14.5	11.9	6.4	2.7	0.6	1.0		0.9		0.9
Down	12.3	11.8	8.4	5.2	2.2	3.8	3.7		2.1	4.9
Dungannon and South Tyrone	5.9	2.9					1.1			0.9
Fermanagh	7.7	1.9	1.6	1.8	1.0		0.9			0.4
Larne	25.5	25.8	17.4	16.4	11.5	9.0	12.2	14.5	12.4	15.5
Limavady	11.2	8.5	2.0	1.9	2.1					2.0
Lisburn	18.1	20.4	12.2	11.0	10.7	12.3	13.0	11.0	9.2	10.4
Magherafelt	4.6	4.7	2.5	1.2						
Moyle	5.0	2.9	7.0							
Newry and Mourne	13.5	8.3	3.6	1.0			2.0			
Newtownabbey	18.9	28.4	15.6	10.3	14.0	16.1	10.3	8.0	8.0	16.4
North Down	29.5	38.5	25.2	26.3	20.7	22.7	22.1	17.6	16.0	18.3
Omagh	12.2	16.0	9.0	4.7	3.7	5.0	3.3			1.5
Strabane	9.6	3.0	1.7		1.1	2.2	0.9			
Northern Ireland totals	13.7	14.4	8.9	7.0	6.9	7.6	6.6	5.1	5.0	7.4

=== Vote share by district council (2014–present) ===
	2014	2019	2023
Antrim and Newtownabbey	12.7%	18.7%	17.1%
Ards and North Down	13.4%	22.2%	26.6%
Armagh, Banbridge and Craigavon	3.3%	7.8%	10.6%
Belfast City	11.4%	15.7%	15.9%
Causeway Coast and Glens	3.9%	8.0%	9.7%
Derry and Strabane	1.6%	4.7%	4.5%
Fermanagh and Omagh	1.7%	3.9%	6.0%
Lisburn and Castlereagh	12.0%	23.6%	28.5%
Mid and East Antrim	9.4%	15.8%	18.9%
Mid Ulster	0.6%	1.2%	2.8%
Newry, Mourne and Down	2.4%	7.5%	9.4%
Northern Ireland totals	6.6%	11.5%	13.3%

=== Devolved legislature elections ===
Election	Leader	Body	Votes	%	Seats	+/–	Position	Status
1973	Oliver Napier	Assembly	66,541	9.2	8 / 78	▲8	▲4th	Coalition
1975	Oliver Napier	Constitutional; Convention	64,657	9.8	8 / 78	Steady	▼5th	Consultative
1982	Oliver Napier	Assembly	58,851	9.3	10 / 78	▲2	▲4th	Fourth party
1996	John Alderdice	Forum	49,176	6.5	7 / 110	▲7	▼5th	Consultative
1998	John Alderdice	Assembly	52,636	5.6	6 / 108	▲6	5th	Opposition
2003	David Ford	Assembly	25,372	3.7	6 / 108	Steady	5th	Direct rule
2007	David Ford	Assembly	36,139	5.2	7 / 108	▲1	5th	Opposition (2007–2010)
2007	David Ford	Assembly	36,139	5.2	7 / 108	▲1	5th	Coalition (2010–2011)
2011	David Ford	Assembly	50,875	7.7	8 / 108	▲1	5th	Coalition
2016	David Ford	Assembly	48,447	7.0	8 / 108	Steady	5th	Opposition
2017	Naomi Long	Assembly	72,717	9.1	8 / 90	Steady	5th	Coalition
2022	Naomi Long	Assembly	116,681	13.5	17 / 90	▲9	▲3rd	Coalition

== Leaders ==
Leader		From	To
1	Oliver Napier and Bob Cooper	1970	1972
2	Phelim O'Neill	1972	1972
3	Oliver Napier	1972	1984
4	John Cushnahan	1984	1987
5	John Alderdice	1987	1998
6	Seán Neeson	1998	2001
7	David Ford	2001	2016
8	Naomi Long	2016	Incumbent

== Deputy leaders ==
Deputy Leader		From	To
1	Bob Cooper	1973	1976
2	Basil Glass	1976	1980
3	David Cook	1980	1984
4	Addie Morrow	1984	1987
5	Gordon Mawhinney	1987	1991
6	Seamus Close	1991	2001
7	Eileen Bell	2001	2006
8	Naomi Long	2006	2016
9	Stephen Farry	2016	2024
10	Eóin Tennyson	2024	Incumbent

== Elected representatives and party spokesman ==
=== MPs ===
Portrait	Name	Constituency	Term	Notes
	Stratton Mills	Belfast North	1959–1974 (Note: Alliance Party MP from 1973 to 1974.)	Defected from the Ulster Unionist Party (UUP)
	Naomi Long	Belfast East	2010–2015	Leader of the Alliance Party (2016–present)
	Stephen Farry	North Down	2019–2024	Deputy Leader of the Alliance Party (2016–2024)
	Sorcha Eastwood	Lagan Valley	2024–present	

=== MLAs ===
MLA Name	Constituency	Gain
Naomi Long MLA	Belfast East	
Peter McReynolds MLA	Belfast East	
Nuala McAllister MLA	Belfast North	Gain
Paula Bradshaw MLA	Belfast South	
Kate Nicholl MLA	Belfast South	Gain
Stewart Dickson MLA	East Antrim	
Danny Donnelly MLA	East Antrim	Gain
Michelle Guy MLA	Lagan Valley	Co-opted
David Honeyford MLA	Lagan Valley	Gain
Sian Mulholland MLA	North Antrim	Gain
Connie Egan MLA	North Down	Gain
Andrew Muir MLA	North Down	
John Blair MLA	South Antrim	
Andrew McMurray MLA	South Down	Co-opted
Kellie Armstrong MLA	Strangford	
Nick Mathison MLA	Strangford	Gain
Eóin Tennyson MLA	Upper Bann	Gain

== Alliance Youth ==
Alliance Youth
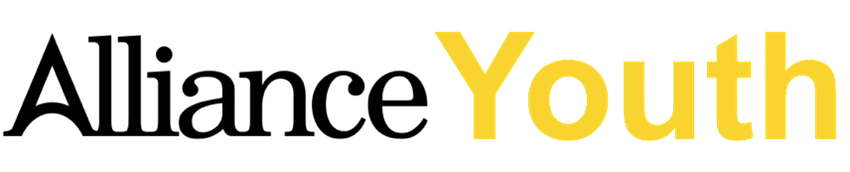
- Chairperson: Thomas Blain
- Vice-Chairperson: Sophia Armstrong
- Ideology: Liberalism; Pro-Europeanism
- Mother party: Alliance Party
- Website: allianceyouthni.org

Alliance Youth is the youth and student movement of the Alliance Party. Alliance members who are under 25 years old automatically become members of Alliance Youth if they choose to share their details at registration. Alliance Youth is also responsible for overseeing Alliance Societies at Northern Ireland universities. Young Liberals Northern Ireland does not organise in any of Northern Ireland's Universities, encouraging members to become active within Alliance Youth societies.

=== Activity ===
Alliance Youth actively campaign on issues affecting young people, and aim to shape policy of the main party in these areas. Previous campaigns have focused on racism, child poverty, and human trafficking, as well as specific domestic issues facing young people, such as mental health care, tuition fees, sustainable transport, LGBT rights and homelessness.

Alliance Youth is also particularly active in the recruitment and support of young candidates and elected representatives.

=== Executive ===
The current executive is as follows:

Position	Holder
Chair	Thomas Blain
Vice Chair	Sophia Armstrong
Secretary	Cllr Amy Mairs
Treasurer	Eoin Millar
Campaigns & Development Officer	Markus Smith
Equality, Diversity & Welfare Officer	Olivia McCormack
Under 18 Membership Officer	Conor Dee
International Officer	Tommy Monahan
Social Media Officer	Shay Fox
Policy Officer	Seán Marshall
QUB Alliance Rep	Eoin Millar
UU Alliance Rep	Vacant

== See also ==
- Contributions to liberal theory
- Demographics and politics of Northern Ireland
- Liberalism in the United Kingdom
