= David K. Alderdice =

Former Lord Mayor of Belfast (born 1966)

The Right Honourable David Alderdice OBE FRCPI
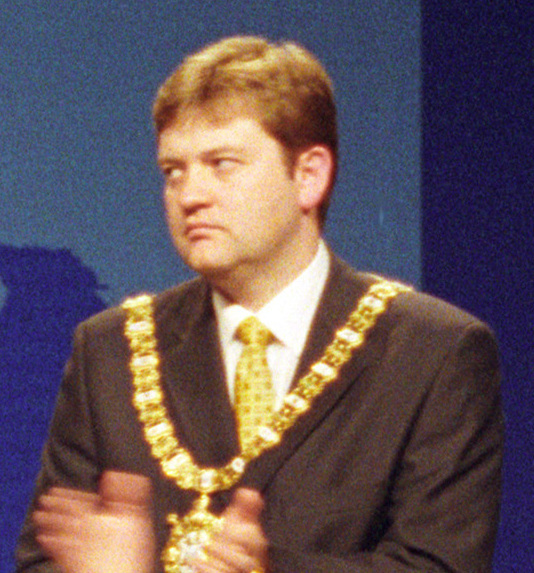
- Alderdice in 1998

President of the Alliance Party
- Incumbent
- Assumed office June 2023
- Leader: Naomi Long

Member of North Down Borough Council
- In office 5 May 2005 – 31 July 2010
- Preceded by: Susan O'Brien
- Succeeded by: Andrew Muir
- Constituency: Holywood

55th Lord Mayor of Belfast
- In office 1 June 1998 – 1 June 1999
- Deputy: Marie Moore
- Preceded by: Alban Maginness
- Succeeded by: Bob Stoker

Member of Belfast City Council
- In office 21 May 1997 – 2005
- Preceded by: John Alderdice
- Succeeded by: Mervyn Jones
- Constituency: Victoria

Personal details
- Born: 2 June 1966 (age 60) Ballymena, Northern Ireland
- Party: Alliance; Liberal Democrats
- Spouse: Fiona Alderdice
- Children: 3
- Relatives: John Alderdice (brother)
- Education: Queen's University Belfast (BSc)

David King Alderdice, OBE, FRCPI (born 2 June 1966) is a Northern Irish politician, medical doctor and clergyman. He was the Lord Mayor of Belfast and is President of the Alliance Party of Northern Ireland.

== Early life and personal ==
Born into a Presbyterian manse, Alderdice was educated at Ballymena Academy. His middle name, King, is after his great-great-grand-uncle, John King, a 19th-century Australian explorer and the sole survivor of the Burke and Wills expedition. He graduated in Medicine from Queen's University Belfast in 1989 and worked as a junior doctor in the Royal Victoria Hospital in Belfast. He moved to Oxford where he read PPE (1992–94) at Harris Manchester College, Oxford. He was an Elder in the Presbyterian Church in Ireland until 2019 when he resigned citing the narrowing of spiritual outlook in PCI and its intolerance of minorities as the reasons for leaving. He is currently Chair of the Church Committee of First Church Belfast which is the city’s oldest surviving place of worship. His brother is John Alderdice, Baron Alderdice.

== Professional ==
As a trainee doctor he worked in Belfast, Oxfordshire and London. He was appointed as Consultant Dermatologist in 2002 initially working in the Causeway Trust (Northern Ireland) and then he moved to the South Eastern Trust in 2010. He is Clinical Director for Cancer Services (South Eastern Trust), Consultant Dermatologist and runs the Northern Ireland Regional Psychodermatology service. He was appointed President of the Irish Association of Dermatologists in September 2022.

== Political career ==
He joined the Alliance Party in 1985 and was active in Young Alliance and Queens Alliance. He first ran for political office in Ballymena Borough Council elections while a medical student in 1989. He was the first Belfast City Councillor to be elected Lord Mayor of Belfast with votes from both Unionist and Nationalist Councillors. He welcomed many visitors and heads of state to the City in the period after the signing of the Good Friday Agreement, including Václav Havel, Mary Robinson and Bill Clinton.

During his time as Lord Mayor of Belfast, dissident republicans detonated the Omagh bomb, the worst atrocity of The Troubles, killing 29 individuals. As leader of the Alliance Party City Hall group, Alderdice took the controversial decision to vote for Councillor Alex Maskey of Sinn Féin to be Lord Mayor in 2002 which resulted in violence from loyalists upon his family and home. He stood down from elected office after submitting his resignation in July 2010 which came into effect at the end of the month. In June 2023 he was elected President of the Alliance Party of Northern Ireland.

Election Results
Constituency	Election	Year	Count (percentage)
North Antrim	Westminster	1997	2845 (6%)
East Belfast	Westminster	2001	5832 (15.83%)
North Down	Westminster	2005	2451 (7.59%)

Councillor
Constituency	Year
Belfast City	1997–2007
North Down	2005–2010

== Honours ==
He was awarded an OBE in 1999 for services to local government.
