= John Alderdice, Baron Alderdice =

Northern Irish politician (born 1955)

The Right Honourable The Lord Alderdice
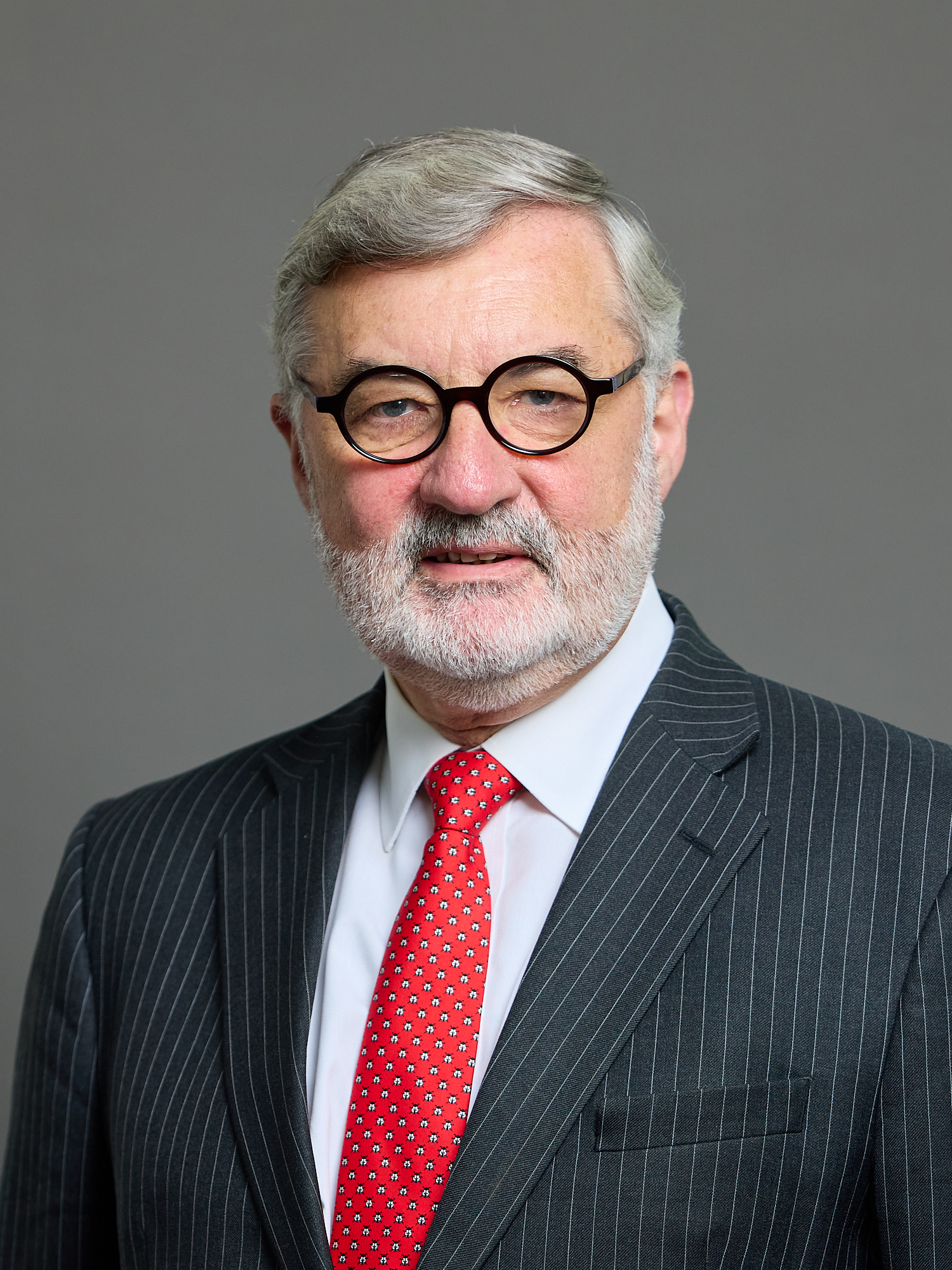
- Official portrait, 2025

President of Liberal International
- In office 25 April 2005 – 20 April 2009
- Preceded by: Annemie Neyts-Uyttebroeck
- Succeeded by: Hans van Baalen

Speaker of the Northern Ireland Assembly
- In office 1 July 1998 – 29 February 2004
- Deputy: John Gorman; Donovan McClelland; Jane Morrice; Jim Wilson
- Preceded by: Position established
- Succeeded by: Eileen Bell

Leader of the Alliance Party of Northern Ireland
- In office 1987–1998
- Deputy: Gordon Mawhinney; Seamus Close
- General Secretary: Eileen Bell; David Ford
- Preceded by: John Cushnahan
- Succeeded by: Seán Neeson

Member of the Legislative Assembly for Belfast East
- In office 25 June 1998 – 26 November 2003
- Preceded by: New creation
- Succeeded by: Naomi Long

Member of Belfast City Council
- In office 17 May 1989 – 1997
- Preceded by: Oliver Napier
- Succeeded by: David Alderdice
- Constituency: Victoria

Member of the House of Lords
- Lord Temporal
- Life peerage 7 October 1996

Personal details
- Born: John Thomas Alderdice; 28 March 1955 (age 71) Ballymena, Northern Ireland
- Party: Alliance
- Other political affiliations: Liberal Democrats (Note: As a peer)
- Spouse(s): Joan Hill, Lady Alderdice
- Children: 3
- Education: Queen's University Belfast

John Thomas Alderdice, Baron Alderdice (born 28 March 1955), is a Northern Ireland politician. He was the Speaker and a Member of the Northern Ireland Assembly (MLA) for East Belfast from 1998 to 2004 and 1998 to 2003, respectively. Alderdice was the leader of the Alliance Party of Northern Ireland from 1987 to 1998, and since 1996 has sat in the House of Lords as a Liberal Democrat.

== Personal life ==
Alderdice was born to David Alderdice and Annie Margaret Helena Shields. He was educated at Ballymena Academy and the Queen's University Belfast (QUB) where he studied medicine and qualified in 1978. In 1977 he married Joan Hill, with whom he has two sons and one daughter. He worked part-time as a consultant psychiatrist in psychotherapy in the NHS from 1988 until he retired from psychiatric practice in 2010. He also lectured at Queen's University's Faculty of Medicine between 1991 and 1999.

Alderdice claims a distant relationship to John King, a 19th-century Australian explorer and the sole survivor of the Burke and Wills expedition. He is the older brother of David Alderdice.

== Political career in Northern Ireland ==
The Alliance Party was formed in 1970 as an alternative to sectarian politics. Alderdice was on the executive committee of the party between 1984 and 1998, chair of the policy committee between 1985 and 1987 and the party vice-chair in 1987, before becoming the party leader after the 1987 general election. He contested Belfast East for the party in 1987 and 1992. He received 32.1% of the vote in 1987, the highest percentage achieved by Alliance in an individual seat in a Westminster election until Naomi Long's historic victory for the party in Belfast East in the 2010 general election. In 1988, in Alliance's keynote post-Anglo Irish Agreement document, "Governing with Consent", Alderdice called for a devolved power-sharing government based on a voluntary coalition elected by a qualified majority vote. Throughout the late 1980s and early 1990s, Alliance's vote across Northern Ireland stabilised at between 6% and 8%.

Alderdice once again contested Belfast East in the 1992 general election. He led the Alliance delegation to the Forum for Peace and Reconciliation at Dublin Castle and the Northern Ireland multiparty talks, and was a member of the Northern Ireland Forum.

Alderdice was willing to talk with Sinn Féin after the IRA called a ceasefire in 1994, when many in the unionist community regarded such discussions as unacceptable.

He was elected to the Northern Ireland Assembly for Belfast East in 1998 and became the assembly's first speaker, serving until 2004. Mo Mowlam said that Alderdice's "political and parliamentary experience mean that he is well suited to carry out this role". Alderdice was a member of Belfast City Council from 1989 until 1997 representing the Victoria constituency. He resigned as party leader in 1998 to take the position of Speaker. He was a member of the Independent Monitoring Commission from 2004 to 2011.

== Elevation to peerage ==
Alderdice was created a life peer on 8 October 1996 as Baron Alderdice, of Knock in the City of Belfast, and was one of the youngest ever life peers. He sits in the House of Lords as a Liberal Democrat. On 10 June 2010, he was elected to the new position of convenor of the Liberal Democrat peers, a role in which he chaired the Liberal Democrat parliamentary party in the House of Lords; he left the convenor position in 2014.

He was elected president of Liberal International in 2005 and served until Liberal International's Cairo congress in 2009. He was succeeded by Dutch politician Hans van Baalen.

== Awards and honours ==
Alderdice has been awarded several honours: the John F Kennedy Profiles in Courage Award in 1998; the W. Averell Harriman Democracy Award in 1998; the Silver Medal of Congress of Peru in 1999 and 2004; the Medal of Honour, College of Medicine of Peru in 1999; and the Freedom of the City of Baltimore in 1991. He was an elder in the Presbyterian Church in Ireland, but resigned in June 2018 due to the church's opposition to same-sex relationships.

In 2001, he was made an honorary fellow of the Royal College of Psychiatrists and has also been awarded an honorary doctorate in law from Robert Gordon University.

== Arms ==
Coat of arms of John Alderdice, Baron Alderdice
Coronet of a Baron Crest In front of a Boar salient to the sinister Azure armed and unguled Or a Boar salient Or armed and unguled Azure Escutcheon Or a Fess wavy between two Cotises wavy set on the outer edge with Alder Leaves all between three Estoiles Azure Supporters On either side a Pegasus reguardant Argent maned tailed unguled and winged Or in the mouth a Flax Flower Azure slipped and leaved Or Motto Bene Qui Pacifi Badge Within an Annulet set on the outer rim with Alder Leaves the Head of Janus couped Or

== See also ==
- List of Northern Ireland members of the House of Lords

Northern Ireland Forum
New forum	Member for East Belfast; 1996–1998	Forum dissolved
Northern Ireland Assembly
New assembly	MLA for Belfast East; 1998–2003	Succeeded by Naomi Long
Party political offices
Preceded by John Cushnahan	Leader of the Alliance Party (NI); 1987–1998	Succeeded by Seán Neeson
Preceded by Annemie Neyts-Uyttebroeck	President of the Liberal International; 2005–2009	Succeeded by Hans van Baalen
Political offices
New office	Speaker of the Northern Ireland Assembly; 1998–2004	Succeeded by Eileen Bell
Orders of precedence in the United Kingdom
Preceded by The Lord Saatchi	Gentlemen; Baron Alderdice	Followed by The Lord Chadlington
