= Border poll =

Referendum on border location or presence

Border polls are referendums that are either about the exact location of a border or whether there should be a particular border at all. They are seen as both an alternative to war and a means of respecting the right to self determination for the local population, although there can sometimes be disputes regarding their fairness and whether they instead legitimise the current regime.

== Border polls held in the aftermath of the First World War ==
- 1919 Vorarlberg referendum
- 1920 Carinthian plebiscite
- 1920 Schleswig plebiscites
- 1919 Ålandic status referendum
- 1920 East Prussian plebiscite
- 1935 Saar status referendum
- Sopron plebiscite
- Upper Silesia plebiscite

== Other border polls ==
- 1973 Northern Ireland border poll
- 1915–1916 Church of England border polls
- 1961 British Cameroons referendum
- 2012 North Kosovo referendum
- 2015 La Manga del Cura status referendum
- Abyei status referendum
