= David Cook (Northern Ireland politician) =

Northern Irish politician (1944–2020)

Member of the Northern Ireland Assembly
- In office 1982–1986
- Constituency: Belfast South

Lord Mayor of Belfast
- In office 1978–1979
- Preceded by: James Stewart
- Succeeded by: Billy Bell

Deputy Leader of the APNI
- In office 1980–1984
- Preceded by: Basil Glass
- Succeeded by: Addie Morrow

Personal details
- Born: David Somerville Cook; 25 January 1944 Leicester, England
- Died: 19 September 2020 (aged 76) Portadown, Northern Ireland
- Party: Alliance Party of Northern Ireland (APNI)
- Occupation: Politician, solicitor

David Somerville Cook (25 January 1944 – 19 September 2020) was an English-born solicitor and politician. He was a founding member of the non-sectarian, liberal-centre Alliance Party in Northern Ireland. He served on Belfast City Council from 1973 to 1986, and in 1978 he became the first non-Unionist Lord Mayor of Belfast since 1898. He was elected as a member of the Northern Ireland Assembly of 1982 and served on that body until its abolishment in 1986. He was appointed Chair of the Police Authority of Northern Ireland in 1994 and held that position until his resignation from the role in 1996.

== Early life ==
Cook was born on 25 January 1944, to Francis John Granville Cook and Jocelyn McKay (née Stewart) in Leicester, England. As a child, he moved to Northern Ireland with his parents and sisters after his father was appointed headmaster of Campbell College in 1954.

== Professional career ==
Cook worked as a solicitor, eventually becoming a senior partner at Sheldon and Stewart Solicitors.

== Political career ==
In 1970, Cook was a founder member of the Alliance Party of Northern Ireland (APNI), a non-sectarian party, while he was elected to the party's Central Executive in 1971.

He was elected to Belfast City Council in 1973, a position he held until 1985. In 1978, he became the first non-Unionist Lord Mayor of Belfast since William James Pirrie, a Home Rule Liberal, in 1896–1898.

He stood for APNI in Belfast South in the February 1974 general election, taking just under 10% of the vote. He was able to improve to 27% of the vote at the 1982 Belfast South by-election. Following this, he won a seat on the Northern Ireland Assembly representing Belfast South.

In the 1983 general election, 1986 by-election and 1987 general election, he consistently won over 20% of the votes cast in Belfast South. He also stood for Alliance in the 1984 European Parliament election, but took only 4% of the vote. From 1980 to 1984, Cook served as the Deputy Leader of APNI.

In 1994, Cook became the Chairman of the Police Authority of Northern Ireland, but he was sacked from this role in 1996 after losing a vote of confidence. After a critical account of his role in an internal row in that authority appeared in newspapers in 1998, he undertook a lengthy libel case which was ultimately settled out of court. He subsequently sat on the Craigavon Health and Social Services Trust.

== Death ==
On 20 September 2020, it was announced that Cook had died after being diagnosed with COVID-19 during the pandemic. According to his family, he died on 19 September 2020, at Craigavon Area Hospital. He had had a stroke two years before. He was survived by his wife Fionnuala, his sisters Alison and Nora, his daughter Barbary, his sons John, Patrick, Julius, and Dominic, and his granddaughters Romy and Imogen.

Northern Ireland Assembly (1982)
New assembly	MPA for South Belfast; 1982–1986	Assembly abolished
Civic offices
Preceded by James Stewart	Lord Mayor of Belfast; 1978–79	Succeeded by Billy Bell
Party political offices
Preceded by Basil Glass	Deputy Leader of the Alliance Party of Northern Ireland; 1980–84	Succeeded by Addie Morrow
