= John Cushnahan =

Irish politician (born 1948)

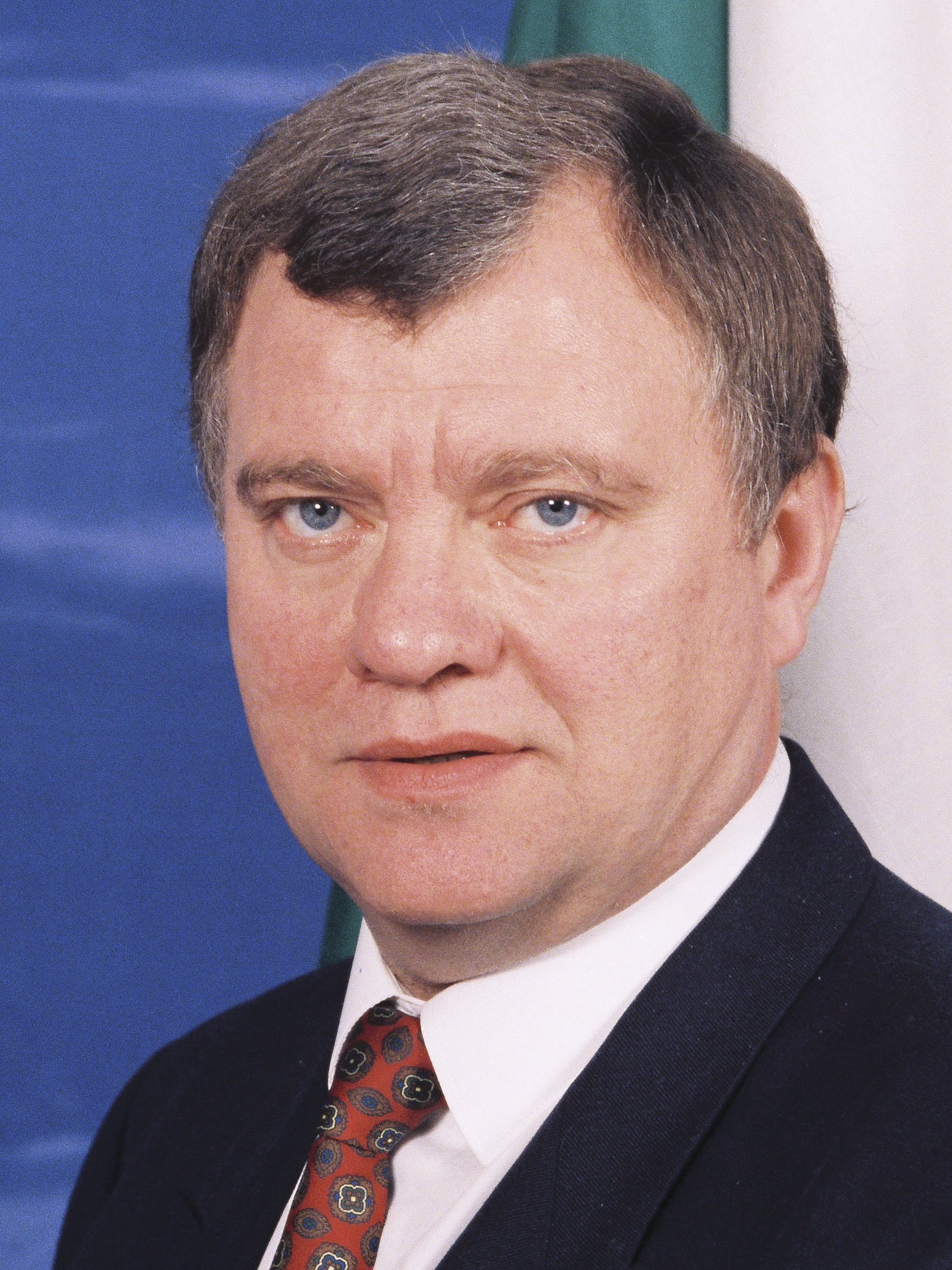
- Cushnahan in 1994

Member of the European Parliament
- In office 1989–2004
- Constituency: Munster

Leader of the Alliance Party of Northern Ireland
- In office 1984–1987
- Deputy: Addie Morrow
- Preceded by: Oliver Napier
- Succeeded by: John Alderdice

Member of the Northern Ireland Assembly for North Down
- In office 1982–1986
- Preceded by: New position
- Succeeded by: Assembly abolished

Member of Belfast City Council
- In office 18 May 1977 – 15 May 1985
- Preceded by: John Ferguson
- Succeeded by: District abolished
- Constituency: Belfast Area H

Personal details
- Born: 23 July 1948 (age 78) Belfast, Northern Ireland
- Party: Alliance; Fine Gael
- Education: Queen's University Belfast
- Profession: Teacher

John Walls Cushnahan (born 23 July 1948) is a former Northern Irish politician who served as leader of the Alliance Party of Northern Ireland from 1984 to 1987, as well as a member of Belfast City Council for the Area H District from 1977 until 1985.

Cushnahan also served as a Member of the Northern Ireland Assembly (MLA) for North Down to 1982 to 1986.

He later moved to the Republic of Ireland to serve as a Fine Gael Member of the European Parliament (MEP) for the Munster constituency from 1989 to 2004.

== Background ==
Cushnahan was educated at St Mary's Christian Brothers Grammar School and Queen's University, Belfast and worked as a teacher before going into politics. He worked as General Secretary of the Alliance Party from 1974 until 1982 and was a member of Belfast City Council between 1977 and 1985.

In 1982 he was elected to the Prior Assembly for North Down and two years later he became the new leader of Alliance, succeeding Oliver Napier. During his tenure as leader he sought to strengthen the party's links with the British Liberal Party. The Anglo Irish Agreement was signed during this period and Cushnahan faced the difficult position of giving Alliance support to it and facing the united opposition of the Unionist parties. However, when the Assembly was dissolved in 1986, Cushnahan found it financially difficult to remain in politics and so stood down as leader in 1987 to be succeeded by John Alderdice.

Two years later Cushnahan made a surprise political comeback when he moved to the Republic of Ireland and stood as a Fine Gael candidate in the 1989 election to the European Parliament, winning a seat in the Munster constituency. He was an MEP for fifteen years before retiring at the 2004 elections.

Cushnahan now serves as a board member of the peace and reconciliation charity Co-operation Ireland.

Northern Ireland Assembly (1982)
New assembly	MPA for North Down; 1982–1986	Assembly abolished
Party political offices
Preceded by Bob Cooper?	General Secretary of the Alliance Party of Northern Ireland; 1974–1982	Succeeded by ?
Preceded by Oliver Napier	Leader of the Alliance Party of Northern Ireland; 1984–1987	Succeeded by John Alderdice
