= Bob Cooper (politician) =

Northern Irish politician (1936–2004)

Sir Bob Cooper CBE

Minister of Manpower Services
- In office 1 January 1974 – 28 May 1974
- Preceded by: Office created
- Succeeded by: Office abolished

Leader of the Alliance Party
- In office 1970–1972
- Preceded by: Created
- Succeeded by: Phelim O'Neill

Personal details
- Born: 24 June 1936 County Donegal, Ireland
- Died: 15 November 2004 (aged 68) Holywood, County Down, Northern Ireland
- Party: Alliance; Ulster Unionist
- Spouse: Pat
- Children: 2
- Education: Queen's University Belfast
- Occupation: Solicitor

Sir Robert George Cooper, CBE (24 June 1936 – 15 November 2004) was a politician and equal opportunities activist in Northern Ireland.

Born and raised in the east of County Donegal in the north-west of Ulster, Cooper, a Presbyterian, attended Foyle College and then studied law at The Queen's University of Belfast, where he was the Chair of the Young Unionists. Despite his Protestant Unionist background, Cooper married a Catholic.

In 1970, Cooper became a founder member of the Alliance Party of Northern Ireland, and at the 1973 Northern Ireland Assembly election, he was elected for West Belfast. He served as Minister for Manpower Services, a junior position in the Sunningdale Northern Ireland Executive. Soon after, he became deputy leader of the party, and in 1975 he was elected to the Northern Ireland Constitutional Convention.

In 1976, Cooper left politics to take up an appointment as head of the Fair Employment Agency. In 1990, this became the Fair Employment Commission, and he continued in the post until 1999. He then headed the Integrated Education Fund until shortly before his death.

Cooper was appointed Commander of the Order of the British Empire (CBE) in the 1987 Birthday Honours and was knighted in the 1998 Birthday Honours for services to equal opportunities. His wife was Lady Pat Cooper.

Northern Ireland Assembly (1973)
New assembly	Assembly Member for West Belfast; 1973–1974	Assembly abolished
Northern Ireland Constitutional Convention
New convention	Member for West Belfast; 1975–1976	Convention dissolved
Party political offices
New title	Joint Leader of the Alliance Party of Northern Ireland; 1970–72; With: Oliver Napier	Succeeded by Phelim O'Neill (acting)
Preceded by Grace Wilson (acting)	General Secretary of the Alliance Party of Northern Ireland; 1972–74	Succeeded by John Cushnahan?
New title	Deputy Leader of the Alliance Party of Northern Ireland; 1973–76	Succeeded by Basil Glass
