= Oliver Napier =

British politician

Sir Oliver Napier

Legal Minister and Head of the Office of Law Reform
- In office 1 January 1974 – 28 May 1974
- Preceded by: Office created
- Succeeded by: Office abolished

Leader of the Alliance Party of Northern Ireland
- In office 1970–1972 Serving with Bob Cooper
- Preceded by: Created
- Succeeded by: Phelim O'Neill
- In office 1972–1984
- Preceded by: Phelim O'Neill
- Succeeded by: John Cushnahan

Personal details
- Born: 11 July 1935 Belfast, Northern Ireland
- Died: 2 July 2011 (aged 75) Belfast, Northern Ireland
- Party: Alliance
- Spouse: Briege Barnes
- Children: 9
- Education: Queen's University Belfast
- Occupation: Solicitor

Sir Oliver Napier (11 July 1935 – 2 July 2011) was the first leader of the Alliance Party of Northern Ireland. In 1974 he served as the first and only Legal Minister and head of the Office of Legal Reform in the Northern Ireland power-sharing executive set up by the Sunningdale Agreement.

== Early life ==
Napier was educated at St. Malachy's College, Belfast and the Queen's University of Belfast before starting work as a solicitor.

== Political career ==
Napier joined the Ulster Liberal Party, rising to become vice president by 1969. That year, he led a group of four party members who joined the New Ulster Movement, accepting the post of joint chairman of its political committee. The Liberal Party promptly expelled him, but, working with Bob Cooper, he used his position to establish a new political party, the Alliance Party of Northern Ireland, which sought to become a political force that could command support from across the divided communities of the province, but remaining pro-union. This aimed to offer an alternative to what Napier described as the sectarianism of the Ulster Unionist Party. Despite his faith he was a supporter of the Union.

He served as the party's joint leader from 1970 until 1972, then as its sole leader from 1973 to 1984. Under his leadership Alliance participated in successive assemblies that sought to solve the debate on the province's position, including the Northern Ireland Assembly, 1973 in which Napier was a minister in the power-sharing Executive. In 1979 he came closer to winning a seat in the Westminster Parliament than any other Alliance candidate up to that point when he was less than a thousand votes behind Peter Robinson's winning total in Belfast East in a tight three-way marginal. This record was beaten in 2010, when Naomi Long ousted Robinson from the same seat. When Napier stepped down as leader in 1984 he received many plaudits for his work. The following year he was knighted and in 1989 he stood down from Belfast City Council, seemingly to retire.

However, in 1995 he returned to the political fray when he contested the North Down by-election for the Alliance, standing again in the 1997 general election.

In 1996 he was elected to the Northern Ireland Peace Forum for North Down.

Prior to his death Oliver Napier was the last prominent member of the Ulster Liberal Party.

== Public positions ==
Napier served on the board of governors of the first integrated school in Northern Ireland, Lagan College.

Northern Ireland Assembly (1973)
New assembly	Assembly Member for East Belfast; 1973–1974	Assembly abolished
Northern Ireland Constitutional Convention
New convention	Member for East Belfast; 1975–1976	Convention dissolved
Northern Ireland Assembly (1982)
New assembly	MPA for East Belfast; 1982–1986	Assembly abolished
Northern Ireland Forum
New forum	Member for North Down; 1996–1998	Forum abolished
Party political offices
New title	Joint Leader of the Alliance Party of Northern Ireland; 1970–72; With: Bob Cooper	Succeeded by Phelim O'Neill (acting)
Preceded by Phelim O'Neill (acting)	Leader of the Alliance Party (NI); 1973–1984	Succeeded by John Cushnahan
