= 2001 North Down Borough Council election =

Local government election in Northern Ireland

← 1997	7 June 2001	2005 →

All 25 seats to North Down Borough Council 13 seats needed for a majority
	First party	Second party	Third party
Party	UUP	Alliance	DUP
Seats won	8	5	5
Seat change	▲2	▼1	▲3
	Fourth party	Fifth party	Sixth party
Party	Independent	UK Unionist	NI Women's Coalition
Seats won	4	2	1
Seat change	▲2	▼1	▲1
	Seventh party	Eighth party	Ninth party
Party	PUP	NI Conservatives	Ind. Unionist
Seats won	0	0	0
Seat change	▼2	▼2	▼2
- Party with the most votes by district.

Elections to North Down Borough Council were held on 7 June 2001 on the same day as the other Northern Irish local government elections. The election used four district electoral areas to elect a total of 25 councillors.

== Election results ==
North Down Borough Council Election Result 2001
Party	Seats	Gains	Losses	Net gain/loss	Seats %	Votes %	Votes	+/−
UUP	8	2	0	▲2	32.0	27.3	8,883	▲4.9
Alliance	5	0	1	▼1	20.0	17.6	5,718	▼4.5
DUP	5	3	0	▲3	8.0	14.3	4,631	▲4.9
Independent	4	2	0	▲2	16.0	22.0	7,159	▲9.0
UK Unionist	2	0	1	▼1	8.0	3.6	3,034	▼5.7
NI Women's Coalition	1	1	0	▲1	4.0	3.6	1,166	New
PUP	0	0	2	▼2	0.0	3.6	1,167	▼0.6
NI Unionist	0	0	0	0	0.0	0.6	188	New

Note: "Votes" are the first preference votes.

== Districts summary ==
Results of the North Down Borough Council election, 2001 by district
Ward	%	Cllrs	%	Cllrs	%	Cllrs	%	Cllrs	%	Cllrs	%	Cllrs	Total Cllrs
Ward	UUP		Alliance		DUP		UKUP		NIWC		Others		Total Cllrs
Abbey	30.0	2	17.1	1	22.4	2	13.1	1	0.0	1	17.4	0	6
Ballyholme and Groomsport	23.6	2	12.4	1	11.3	1	8.2	0	6.4	1	38.1	2	7
Bangor West	27.8	2	19.1	2	10.8	1	14.0	0	0.0	0	28.3	1	7
Holywood	30.0	2	24.6	1	15.0	1	0.0	0	8.3	0	22.1	1	5
Total	27.3	8	17.6	5	14.3	5	9.3	2	3.6	1	27.9	4	25

== Districts results ==
=== Abbey ===
1997: 1 x UUP, 1 x Alliance, 1 x UKUP, 1 x Conservative, 1 x DUP, 1 x PUP
2001: 2 x UUP, 2 x DUP, 1 x Alliance, 1 x UKUP
1997-2001 Change: UUP and DUP gain from Conservative and PUP

Abbey - 6 seats
Party	Candidate	FPv%	Count									
Party	Candidate	FPv%	1	2	3	4	5	6	7	8	9	10
DUP	Ivy Cooling*	18.11%	1,263									
UUP	Irene Cree	17.86%	1,246									
Alliance	Stephen Farry*	17.13%	1,195									
UUP	Roberta Dunlop*	12.09%	843	874.24	1,073.32							
UK Unionist	Valerie Kinghan*	13.08%	912	936.64	950.92	984.2	1,014.56					
DUP	William Montgomery	4.29%	299	462.24	464.76	468.92	477.28	491.83	498.36	527.31	572.13	705.53
PUP	Stewart Currie*	5.98%	417	431.3	441.17	470.29	476.89	482.37	489.68	515.63	551.49	648.45
Independent	Karl McLean	4.26%	297	330.3	304.29	320.93	325.33	334.81	366.95	430.23	498.27	
NI Conservatives	Lisa Fleming	2.74%	191	194.96	198.74	247.1	261.62	275.93	292.49	324.03		
Independent	Christopher Carter	2.51%	175	180.06	182.16	211.28	213.92	217.13	234.72			
Independent	William Gordon	1.28%	89	91.64	94.16	119.38	122.79	129.61				
NI Unionist	Colin Dean	1.28%	48	54.6	63	70.8	75.86					
Electorate: 13,445 Valid: 6,975 (51.88%) Spoilt: 250 Quota: 997 Turnout: 7,225 (53.74%)

=== Ballyholme and Groomsport ===
1997: 2 x UUP, 2 x Independent Unionist, 1 x Alliance, 1 x Conservative, 1 x UKUP
2001: 2 x UUP, 2 x Independent, 1 x Alliance, 1 x DUP, 1 x Women's Coalition
1997-2001 Change: DUP and Women's Coalition gain from Conservative and UKUP, Independent Unionists (two seats) become Independent

Ballyholme and Groomsport - 7 seats
Party	Candidate	FPv%	Count										
Party	Candidate	FPv%	1	2	3	4	5	6	7	8	9	10	11
Independent	Alan Chambers*	20.40%	2,099										
UUP	Leslie Cree*	15.85%	1,631										
Independent	Austen Lennon*	13.25%	1,363										
DUP	Alex Easton	11.32%	1,164	1,262.04	1,281.36	1,287.3							
Alliance	Marsden Fitzsimons*	9.13%	939	1,083.48	1,108.89	1,199.99	1,140.67	1,145.65	1,203.14	1,456.14			
UUP	Ian Henry*	5.84%	601	720.11	804.53	812.09	843.14	871.67	928.72	955.95	1,381.64		
NI Women's Coalition	Patricia Wallace	6.39%	657	724.51	731.65	743.05	763.13	767.83	804.97	894.63	926.33	1,077.33	1,106.52
UK Unionist	Henry Gordon	5.55%	571	625.18	637.78	642.34	686.71	902.71	931.35	936.31	989.21	994.21	1,024.45
UUP	Arthur Gadd	1.96%	202	313.8	481.59	488.07	523.97	541.32	576.75	595.96			
Alliance	Gavin Walker	3.27%	336	373.84	376.99	383.35	397.75	401.6	436.34				
Independent	Ernest Steele	2.12%	218	313.89	318.09	329.67	350.62	359.46					
UK Unionist	Joseph Teggart	2.68%	276	306.53	308.42	310.52	329.39						
NI Unionist	Elizabeth Roche*	1.36%	140	164.94	167.25	170.01							
PUP	Brian Lacey	0.87%	90	101.61	104.34	105.96							
Electorate: 17,348 Valid: 10,287 (59.30%) Spoilt: 194 Quota: 1,286 Turnout: 10,481 (60.42%)

=== Bangor West ===
1997: 2 x UUP, 2 x Alliance, 1 x UKUP, 1 x PUP, 1 x Independent
2001: 2 x UUP, 2 x Alliance, 1 x UKUP, 1 x DUP, 1 x Independent
1997-2001 Change: DUP gain from PUP

Bangor West - 7 seats
Party	Candidate	FPv%	Count						
Party	Candidate	FPv%	1	2	3	4	5	6	7
Independent	Brian Wilson*	20.54%	1,871						
UUP	Marion Smith*	14.39%	1,311						
Alliance	Anne Wilson*	12.21%	1,112	1,608.8					
DUP	Alan Graham	10.86%	989	1,007.4	1,021.4	1,037	1,043.16	1,150.16	
UUP	Royston Davies	8.74%	796	827.6	871.2	902.6	966.44	1,077.85	
UK Unionist	William Keery*	7.42%	676	704.8	721.6	740.8	748.5	804.12	1,247.12
Alliance	Tony Hill	6.92%	630	676.8	936.4	965.2	974.86	1,003	1,025.14
UUP	Evan Ward	4.57%	416	474.8	539.6	574.4	648.18	719.4	766.28
UK Unionist	Alan Field	6.58%	599	614.2	625	637.4	642.44	686.98	
PUP	James Rea	5.91%	538	546.8	556.4	560.4	563.9		
NI Conservatives	Julian Robertson	1.89%	172	183.2	196.4				
Electorate: 15,748 Valid: 9,110 (57.85%) Spoilt: 214 Quota: 1,139 Turnout: 9,324 (59.21%)

=== Holywood ===
1997: 2 x Alliance, 1 x UUP, 1 x DUP, 1 x Independent
2001: 2 x UUP, 1 x Alliance, 1 x DUP, 1 x Independent
1997-2001 Change: UUP gain from Alliance

Holywood - 5 seats
Party	Candidate	FPv%	Count					
Party	Candidate	FPv%	1	2	3	4	5	6
UUP	Ellie McKay*	21.98%	1,346					
Alliance	Susan O'Brien*	17.47%	1,070					
DUP	Gordon Dunne*	14.96%	916	954.25	998.5	1,021.5		
Independent	Dennis Ogborn*	13.31%	815	863.75	868.5	905.75	977.5	1,110.5
UUP	Diana Peacocke	8.02%	491	673.25	696.25	764.25	806.75	904.5
NI Women's Coalition	Norma Heaton	8.31%	509	521.75	525.75	539.5	575	751.25
Alliance	Laurence Thompson	7.12%	436	448.5	453.25	472.5	513.5	
Independent	Robert Irvine	3.79%	232	241	259.25	270.5		
NI Conservatives	Lindsay Cumming	3.07%	188	196.5	202.75			
PUP	David Rose	1.99%	122	126				
Electorate: 10,063 Valid: 6,125 (60.87%) Spoilt: 124 Quota: 1,021 Turnout: 6,249 (62.10%)
