= 2005 North Down Borough Council election =

Local government election in Northern Ireland

← 2001	5 May 2005	2011 →

All 25 seats to North Down Borough Council 13 seats needed for a majority
	First party	Second party	Third party
Party	DUP	UUP	Alliance
Seats won	8	8	6
Seat change	▲3	0	▲1
	Fourth party	Fifth party	Sixth party
Party	Independent	Green (NI)	UK Unionist
Seats won	2	1	0
Seat change	▼2	▲1	▼2
	Seventh party
Party	NI Women's Coalition
Seats won	0
Seat change	▼1
- Party with the most votes by district.

Elections to North Down Borough Council were held on 5 May 2005 on the same day as the other Northern Irish local government elections. The election used four district electoral areas to elect a total of 25 councillors.

== Election results ==
North Down Borough Council Election Result 2005
Party	Seats	Gains	Losses	Net gain/loss	Seats %	Votes %	Votes	+/−
DUP	8	3	0	▲3	32.0	31.4	8,901	▲17.1
UUP	8	0	0	0	32.0	21.5	6,055	▼5.8
Alliance	6	1	0	▲1	24.0	16.0	4,533	▼1.6
Independent	2	0	2	▼2	8.0	11.1	3,114	▼10.9
Green (NI)	1	1	0	▲1	4.0	9.1	2,548	New
UK Unionist	0	0	2	▼2	0.0	2.6	734	▼6.7
NI Women's Coalition	0	0	1	▼1	0.0	2.6	738	▼1.0
PUP	0	0	0	0	0.0	2.3	651	▼1.3
SDLP	0	0	0	0	0.0	1.9	525	▲1.9
NI Conservatives	0	0	0	0	0.0	1.3	353	▼0.4

Note: "Votes" are the first preference votes.

== Districts summary ==
Results of the North Down Borough Council election, 2005 by district
Ward	%	Cllrs	%	Cllrs	%	Cllrs	%	Cllrs	%	Cllrs	Total Cllrs
Ward	DUP		UUP		Alliance		Green		Others		Total Cllrs
Abbey	42.1	3	18.5	2	12.0	1	6.4	0	21.0	0	6
Ballyholme and Groomsport	32.5	2	22.5	2	11.1	0	0.0	1	33.9	2	7
Bangor West	25.9	2	18.1	1	14.9	2	19.8	1	21.3	0	7
Holywood	25.4	1	31.8	2	31.4	2	11.4	0	0.0	0	5
Total	31.4	8	21.5	8	16.0	6	9.1	1	22.0	2	25

== Districts results ==
=== Abbey ===
2001: 2 x UUP, 2 x DUP, 1 x Alliance, 1 x UKUP
2005: 3 x DUP, 2 x UUP, 1 x Alliance
2001-2005 Change: DUP gain from UKUP

Abbey - 6 seats
Party	Candidate	FPv%	Count									
Party	Candidate	FPv%	1	2	3	4	5	6	7	8	9	10
DUP	Ivy Cooling*	16.96%	1,044									
DUP	Wesley Irvine	13.68%	842	964.94								
UUP	Harry Dunlop	12.28%	756	766.08	768.48	791.48	818.48	871.48				
DUP	William Montgomery*	10.11%	622	653.14	750.42	766.6	804.96	859.96				
Alliance	Stephen Farry*	11.59%	713	713.9	714.38	724.38	751.38	781.56	782.88	783.44	822.8	863.8
UUP	Roberta Dunlop*	5.64%	347	352.58	353.38	358.38	375.38	458.74	475.02	479.78	593.26	773.28
Green (NI)	Kelly Andrews	6.14%	378	378.72	378.88	402.96	425.96	437.14	437.58	438.42	469.42	520.24
Independent	Irene Cree*	5.00%	308	312.14	312.94	341.28	353.28	385.68	387.88	389	446.06	
PUP	Mark Gordon	5.43%	334	338.86	341.1	347.1	349.28	380.62	380.62	382.3		
UK Unionist	Valerie Kinghan*	4.74%	292	294.88	297.6	306.78	328.78					
NI Conservatives	Dean Russell	2.83%	174	174.54	175.18	183.18						
Independent	Christopher Carter	2.29%	141	142.8	142.96							
Electorate: 12,675 Valid: 6,154 (48.55%) Spoilt: 203 Quota: 851 Turnout: 5,951 (46.95%)

=== Ballyholme and Groomsport ===
2001: 2 x Independent, 2 x UUP, 1 x Alliance, 1 x DUP, 1 x Women's Coalition
2005: 2 x DUP, 2 x UUP, 2 x Independent, 1 x Alliance
2001-2005 Change: DUP gain from Women's Coalition

Ballyholme and Groomsport - 7 seats
Party	Candidate	FPv%	Count						
Party	Candidate	FPv%	1	2	3	4	5	6	7
DUP	Peter Weir	16.85%	1,571						
Independent	Alan Chambers*	16.70%	1,557						
DUP	Alex Easton*	15.66%	1,460						
Alliance	Marsden Fitzsimons*	11.14%	1,039	1,054.5	1,119.74	1,147.42	1,160.92	1,486.92	
Independent	Austen Lennon*	6.65%	620	649.45	733.17	839.67	897.27	1,083.3	1,203.3
UUP	Ian Henry*	7.77%	724	804.29	850.49	902.87	967.37	1,056.33	1,094.33
UUP	Leslie Cree*	7.52%	701	778.19	843.15	890.15	952.85	1,015.17	1,053.17
UUP	Mark Brooks	7.18%	669	742.16	781.64	829.49	897.89	941.17	969.17
NI Women's Coalition	Patricia Wallace*	7.92%	738	756.6	792.72	822.64	842.14		
Independent	Henry Gordon	1.89%	176	196.15	235.91				
UK Unionist	Charles Teggart	0.73%	68	147.05	159.65				
Electorate: 16,218 Valid: 9,323 (57.49%) Spoilt: 156 Quota: 1,166 Turnout: 9,479 (58.44%)

=== Bangor West ===
2001: 2 x UUP, 2 x Alliance, 1 x UKUP, 1 x DUP, 1 x Independent
2005: 2 x DUP, 2 x UUP, 2 x Alliance, 1 x Green
2001-2005 Change: DUP gain from UKUP, Independent joins Greens

Bangor West - 7 seats
Party	Candidate	FPv%	Count								
Party	Candidate	FPv%	1	2	3	4	5	6	7	8	9
Green (NI)	Brian Wilson*	19.83%	1,593								
DUP	Alan Graham*	18.46%	1,483								
UUP	Marion Smith*	12.74%	1,024								
Alliance	Anne Wilson*	9.42%	757	1,116.86							
DUP	Alan Leslie	7.43%	597	640.32	1,054.08						
Alliance	Tony Hill*	5.49%	441	474.82	479.62	533.57	564.37	566.47	583.54	643.54	1,061.91
UUP	James McKerrow	5.38%	432	470	478	499.19	572.83	589.83	660.69	759.07	803.16
UK Unionist	William Keery*	4.65%	374	397.56	423.8	430.04	454.36	475.36	536.16	635.51	653.03
SDLP	William Logan	6.55%	526	564	564.64	576.08	582.74	583.04	590.04	607.68	
Independent	Alan Field	3.88%	312	330.62	337.02	343	359.02	362.37	396.14		
PUP	James Rea	3.95%	317	323.46	327.94	329.24	335.82	340.92			
NI Conservatives	Julian Robertson	2.23%	179	198.76	201.32	207.56					
Electorate: 14,658 Valid: 8,035 (54.82%) Spoilt: 168 Quota: 1,005 Turnout: 8,203 (55.96%)

=== Holywood ===
2001: 2 x UUP, 1 x Alliance, 1 x DUP, 1 x Independent
2005: 2 x UUP, 2 x Alliance, 1 x DUP
2001-2005 Change: Alliance gain from Independent

Holywood - 5 seats
Party	Candidate	FPv%	Count				
Party	Candidate	FPv%	1	2	3	4	5
DUP	Gordon Dunne*	25.42%	1,282				
Alliance	David Alderdice	24.58%	1,240				
UUP	Ellie McKay*	19.81%	999				
UUP	Diana Peacocke*	11.95%	603	954			
Alliance	Ian Parsley	6.80%	343	379.45	714.01	830.65	903.55
Green (NI)	John Barry	11.44%	577	629.65	691.19	731.75	771.35
Electorate: 9,107 Valid: 5,044 (55.39%) Spoilt: 83 Quota: 841 Turnout: 5,127 (56.30%)
