= Electoral history of Tony Blair =

Elections featuring UK Prime Minister

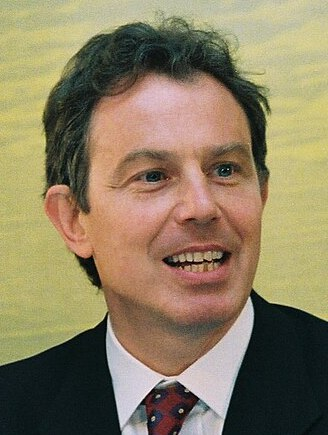
Tony Blair

This is a summary of the electoral history of Tony Blair, who served as Prime Minister of the United Kingdom from 1997 to 2007 and Leader of the Labour Party from 1994 to 2007. He was the member of parliament (MP) for Sedgefield from 1983 to 2007.

== Parliamentary elections ==
=== 1982 by-election, Beaconsfield ===
1982 Beaconsfield by-election
Party	Candidate	Votes	%	±%
Conservative	Tim Smith	23,049	61.8	+0.1
Liberal	Paul Tyler	9,996	26.8	+8.7
Labour	Tony Blair	3,886	10.4	−9.8
New Britain	Michael Byrne	225	0.6	New
Democratic Monarchist	Bill Boaks	99	0.3	New
Benn in Ten Unless Proportional Representation	Thomas Keen	51	0.1	New
Majority		13,053	35.0	−8.2
Turnout		37,306		
Conservative hold		Swing		

=== 1983 general election, Sedgefield ===
General election 1983: Sedgefield
Party	Candidate	Votes	%	±%
Labour	Tony Blair	21,401	47.6	
Conservative	Toby Horton	13,120	29.2	
SDP	David Shand	10,183	22.6	
Independent	Maurice Logan-Salton	298	0.7	
Majority		8,281	18.4	
Turnout		45,002	72.9	
Labour win (new seat)				

=== 1987 general election, Sedgefield ===
General election 1987: Sedgefield
Party	Candidate	Votes	%	±%
Labour	Tony Blair	25,965	56.0	+8.4
Conservative	Nigel Hawkins	12,907	27.9	−1.3
SDP	Ralph Andrew	7,477	16.1	−6.5
Majority		13,058	28.1	+9.7
Turnout		46,349	76.2	+3.3
Labour hold		Swing	+4.9	

=== 1992 general election, Sedgefield ===
General election 1992: Sedgefield
Party	Candidate	Votes	%	±%
Labour	Tony Blair	28,453	60.5	+4.5
Conservative	Nicholas Jopling	13,594	28.9	+1.0
Liberal Democrats	Gary Huntington	4,982	10.6	−5.5
Majority		14,859	31.6	+3.5
Turnout		47,029	77.1	+0.9
Labour hold		Swing	+1.8	

=== 1997 general election, Sedgefield ===
General election 1997: Sedgefield
Party	Candidate	Votes	%	±%
Labour	Tony Blair	33,526	71.2	+10.7
Conservative	Elizabeth Pitman	8,383	17.8	−11.1
Liberal Democrats	Ronald Beadle	3,050	6.5	−4.1
Referendum	Miriam Hall	1,683	3.6	New
Socialist Labour	Brian Gibson	474	1.0	New
Majority		25,143	53.4	+21.8
Turnout		47,116	72.6	−4.5
Labour hold		Swing	+11.3	

=== 2001 general election, Sedgefield ===
General election 2001: Sedgefield
Party	Candidate	Votes	%	±%
Labour	Tony Blair	26,110	64.9	−6.3
Conservative	Douglas Carswell	8,397	20.9	+3.1
Liberal Democrats	Andrew Duffield	3,624	9.0	+2.5
UKIP	Andrew Spence	974	2.4	New
Socialist Labour	Brian Gibson	518	1.3	+0.3
Rock 'n' Roll Loony	Christopher Driver	375	0.9	New
Independent	Helen John	260	0.6	New
Majority		17,713	44.0	−9.4
Turnout		40,258	62.0	−10.6
Labour hold		Swing	−4.7	

=== 2005 general election, Sedgefield ===
General election 2005: Sedgefield
Party	Candidate	Votes	%	±%
Labour	Tony Blair	24,421	58.9	−6.0
Conservative	Al Lockwood	5,972	14.4	−6.5
Liberal Democrats	Robert Woodthorpe Browne	4,935	11.9	+2.9
Independent	Reg Keys	4,252	10.3	New
UKIP	William Brown	646	1.6	−0.8
National Front	Mark Farrell	253	0.6	New
Veritas	Fiona Luckhurst-Matthews	218	0.5	New
Independent	Berony Abraham	209	0.5	New
Monster Raving Loony	Melodie Staniforth	157	0.4	New
Blair Must Go Party	Jonathan Cockburn	103	0.2	New
Senior Citizens	Terence Pattinson	97	0.2	New
Pensioners	Cherri Gilham	82	0.2	New
Independent	Helen John	68	0.2	−0.4
Independent	John Barker	45	0.1	New
Independent	Julian Brennan	17	0.0	New
Majority		18,449	44.5	+0.5
Turnout		41,475	62.2	+0.2
Labour hold		Swing	+0.25	

== 1994 Labour Party leadership election ==
Candidate	Affiliated (33.3%)		Constituencies (33.3%)		PLP (33.3%)		Overall result
Candidate	Votes	%	Votes	%	Votes	%	%
Tony Blair ✓	407,637	52.3	100,313	58.2	198	60.5	57.0
John Prescott	221,367	28.4	42,053	24.4	64	19.6	24.1
Margaret Beckett	150,422	19.3	29,990	17.4	65	19.9	18.9

== United Kingdom general elections ==
=== 1997 general election ===
1997 United Kingdom general election
		Candidates						Votes		
Party	Leader	Stood	Elected	Gained	Unseated	Net	% of total	%	No.	Net %
Labour	Tony Blair	639 (Note: Includes 26 Co-operative Party candidates, as part of the Labour-Co-op alliance)	418 (Note: Includes 26 Co-operative Party MPs, as part of the Labour-Co-op alliance)	146	0	+145 (Note: Includes +12 Co-operative Party MPs, as part of the Labour-Co-op alliance)	63.4 (Note: Includes 3.9% for the Co-operative Party, as part of the Labour-Co-op alliance)	43.2 (Note: Includes 2.1% for the Co-operative Party, as part of the Labour-Co-op alliance)	13,518,167 (Note: Includes 654,203 for the Co-operative Party, as part of the Labour-Co-op alliance)	+8.8 (Note: Includes +0.6% for the Co-operative Party, as part of the Labour-Co-op alliance)
Conservative	John Major	648	165	0	178	–178	25.0	30.7	9,591,085	–11.2
Liberal Democrats	Paddy Ashdown	639	46	30	2	+28	7.0	16.8	5,242,947	–1.0
Referendum	James Goldsmith	547	0	0	0	0		2.6	811,849	N/A
SNP	Alex Salmond	72	6	3	0	+3	0.9	2.0	621,550	+0.1
UUP	David Trimble	16	10	1	0	+1	1.5	0.8	258,349	0.0
SDLP	John Hume	18	3	0	1	–1	0.5	0.6	190,814	+0.1
Plaid Cymru	Dafydd Wigley	40	4	0	0	0	0.6	0.5	161,030	0.0
Sinn Féin	Gerry Adams	17	2	2	0	+2	0.3	0.4	126,921	0.0
DUP	Ian Paisley	9	2	0	1	–1	0.3	0.3	107,348	0.0
UKIP	Alan Sked	193	0	0	0	0		0.3	105,722	N/A
Independent	N/A	25	1	1	0	+1	0.2	0.2	64,482	0.0
Alliance	John Alderdice	17	0	0	0	0		0.2	62,972	0.0
Green	Peg Alexander and David Taylor	89	0	0	0	0		0.2	61,731	–0.2
Socialist Labour	Arthur Scargill	64	0	0	0	0		0.2	52,109	N/A
Liberal	Michael Meadowcroft	53	0	0	0	0		0.1	45,166	–0.1
BNP	John Tyndall	57	0	0	0	0		0.1	35,832	0.0
Natural Law	Geoffrey Clements	197	0	0	0	0		0.1	30,604	–0.1
Speaker	Betty Boothroyd	1	1	1	0	0		0.1	23,969	
ProLife Alliance	Bruno Quintavalle	56	0	0	0	0		0.1	19,332	N/A
UK Unionist	Robert McCartney	1	1	1	0	+1	0.2	0.0	12,817	N/A
PUP	Hugh Smyth	3	0	0	0	0		0.0	10,928	N/A
National Democrats	Ian Anderson	21	0	0	0	0		0.0	10,829	N/A
Socialist	Peter Taaffe		0	0	0	0		0.0	9,906	N/A
Scottish Socialist	Tommy Sheridan	16	0	0	0	0		0.0	9,740	N/A
Independent	N/A	4	0	0	0	0		0.0	9,233	– 0.1
Ind. Conservative	N/A	4	0	0	0	0		0.0	8,608	–0.1
Monster Raving Loony	Screaming Lord Sutch	24	0	0	0	0		0.0	7,906	–0.1
Make Politicians History	Rainbow George Weiss	29	0	0	0	0		0.0	3,745	N/A
NI Women's Coalition	Monica McWilliams and Pearl Sagar	3	0	0	0	0		0.0	3,024	N/A
Workers' Party	Tom French	8	0	0	0	0		0.0	2,766	–0.1
National Front	John McAuley	6	0	0	0	0		0.0	2,716	N/A
Cannabis Law Reform	Howard Marks	4	0	0	0	0		0.0	2,085	N/A
Socialist People's Party	Jim Hamezian	1	0	0	0	0		0.0	1,995	N/A
Mebyon Kernow	Loveday Jenkin	4	0	0	0	0		0.0	1,906	N/A
Green	Robin Harper	5	0	0	0	0		0.0	1,721	
Conservative Anti-Euro	Christopher Story	1	0	0	0	0		0.0	1,434	N/A
Socialist (GB)	None	5	0	0	0	0		0.0	1,359	N/A
Community Representative	Ralph Knight	1	0	0	0	0		0.0	1,290	N/A
Neighborhood association		1	0	0	0	0		0.0	1,263	N/A
SDP	John Bates	2	0	0	0	0		0.0	1,246	–0.1
Workers Revolutionary	Sheila Torrance	9	0	0	0	0		0.0	1,178	N/A
Real Labour	N/A	1	0	0	0	0		0.0	1,117	N/A
Independent Democrat	N/A		0	0	0	0		0.0	982	
Independent	N/A		0	0	0	0		0.0	890	
Communist	Mike Hicks	3	0	0	0	0		0.0	639	
Independent	N/A	1	0	0	0	0		0.0	593	
Green (NI)		1	0	0	0	0		0.0	539	
Socialist Equality	Davy Hyland	3	0	0	0	0		0.0	505	

All parties with more than 500 votes shown. Labour total includes New Labour and "Labour Time for Change" candidates; Conservative total includes candidates in Northern Ireland (excluded in some lists) and "Loyal Conservative" candidate.

The Popular Unionist MP elected in 1992 died in 1995, and the party folded shortly afterwards.

There was no incumbent Speaker in the 1992 election.

Government's new majority	177
Total votes cast	31,286,284
Turnout	71.3%

=== 2001 general election ===
UK General Election 2001
		Candidates						Votes		
Party	Leader	Stood	Elected	Gained	Unseated	Net	% of total	%	No.	Net %
Labour	Tony Blair	640 (Note: Includes 30 Co-operative Party candidates, as part of the Labour-Co-op alliance)	412 (Note: Includes 30 Co-operative Party MPs, as part of the Labour-Co-op alliance)	2	8	−6 (Note: Includes +2 Co-operative Party MPs, as part of the Labour-Co-op alliance)	62.5 (Note: Includes 4.6% for the Co-operative Party, as part of the Labour-Co-op alliance)	40.7 (Note: Includes 2.3% for the Co-operative Party, as part of the Labour-Co-op alliance)	10,724,953 (Note: Includes 601,197 for the Co-operative Party, as part of the Labour-Co-op alliance)	−2.5 (Note: Includes +0.2% for the Co-operative Party, as part of the Labour-Co-op alliance)
Conservative	William Hague	643	166	9	8	+1	25.2	31.6	8,357,615	+1.0
Liberal Democrats	Charles Kennedy	639	52	8	2	+6	7.9	18.3	4,814,321	+1.5
SNP	John Swinney	72	5	0	1	−1	0.8	1.8	464,314	−0.2
UKIP	Jeffrey Titford	428	0	0	0	0	0.0	1.5	390,563	+1.2
UUP	David Trimble	17	6	1	5	−4	0.9	0.8	216,839	0.0
Plaid Cymru	Ieuan Wyn Jones	40	4	1	1	0	0.6	0.7	195,893	+0.2
DUP	Ian Paisley	14	5	3	0	+3	0.8	0.7	181,999	+0.4
Sinn Féin	Gerry Adams	18	4	2	0	+2	0.6	0.7	175,933	+0.3
SDLP	John Hume	18	3	0	0	0	0.5	0.6	169,865	0.0
Green	Margaret Wright and Mike Woodin	145	0	0	0	0	0.0	0.6	166,477	+0.3
Independent	N/A	137	0	0	1	−1	0.0	0.4	98,917	+0.3
Scottish Socialist	Tommy Sheridan	72	0	0	0	0	0.0	0.3	72,516	N/A
Socialist Alliance	N/A	98	0	0	0	0	0.0	0.2	57,553	N/A
Socialist Labour	Arthur Scargill	114	0	0	0	0	0.0	0.2	57,288	0.0
BNP	Nick Griffin	33	0	0	0	0	0.0	0.2	47,129	+0.1
Alliance	Seán Neeson	10	0	0	0	0	0.0	0.1	28,999	−0.1
Health Concern	Richard Taylor	1	1	1	0	+1	0.2	0.1	28,487	N/A
Speaker	N/A	1	1	1	0	+1	0.2	0.1	16,053	N/A
Liberal	Michael Meadowcroft	13	0	0	0	0	0.0	0.1	13,685	0.0
UK Unionist	Robert McCartney	1	0	0	1	−1	0.0	0.1	13,509	+0.1
ProLife Alliance	Bruno Quintavalle	37	0	0	0	0	0.0	0.0	9,453	−0.1
Legalise Cannabis	Alun Buffry	13	0	0	0	0	0.0	0.0	8,677	N/A
People's Justice	Shaukat Ali Khan	3	0	0	0	0	0.0	0.0	7,443	N/A
Monster Raving Loony	Howling Laud Hope and Catmando	15	0	0	0	0	0.0	0.0	6,655	0.0
PUP	Hugh Smyth	2	0	0	0	0	0.0	0.0	4,781	0.0
Mebyon Kernow	Dick Cole	3	0	0	0	0	0.0	0.0	3,199	0.0
NI Women's Coalition	Monica McWilliams and Pearl Sagar	1	0	0	0	0	0.0	0.0	2,968	0.0
Scottish Unionist	Danny Houston	2	0	0	0	0	0.0	0.0	2,728	N/A
Rock 'n' Roll Loony	Chris Driver	7	0	0	0	0	0.0	0.0	2,634	N/A
National Front	Tom Holmes	5	0	0	0	0	0.0	0.0	2,484	0.0
Workers' Party	Seán Garland	6	0	0	0	0	0.0	0.0	2,352	0.0
Neath Port Talbot Ratepayers	Paul Evans	1	0	0	0	0	0.0	0.0	1,960	N/A
NI Unionist	Cedric Wilson	6	0	0	0	0	0.0	0.0	1,794	N/A
Socialist	Peter Taaffe	2	0	0	0	0	0.0	0.0	1,454	0.0
Reform 2000	Erol Basarik	5	0	0	0	0	0.0	0.0	1,418	N/A
Isle of Wight	Philip Murray	1	0	0	0	0	0.0	0.0	1,164	N/A
Muslim		4	0	0	0	0	0.0	0.0	1,150	N/A
Communist	Robert Griffiths	6	0	0	0	0	0.0	0.0	1,003	0.0
New Britain	Dennis Delderfield	1	0	0	0	0	0.0	0.0	888	0.0
Free Party	Bob Dobbs	3	0	0	0	0	0.0	0.0	832	N/A
Leeds Left Alliance	Mike Davies	1	0	0	0	0	0.0	0.0	770	N/A
New Millennium Bean Party	Captain Beany	1	0	0	0	0	0.0	0.0	727	N/A
Workers Revolutionary	Sheila Torrance	6	0	0	0	0	0.0	0.0	607	0.0
Tatton	Paul Williams	1	0	0	0	0	0.0	0.0	505	N/A

Government's new majority	165
Total votes cast	26,367,383
Turnout	59.4%

=== 2005 general election ===
Summary of the results of the 5 May 2005 United Kingdom general election to the House of Commons of the United Kingdom
Political party	Leader	Candidates	Elected	Seats gained	Seats lost	Net change in seats	% of seats	Number of votes	% of votes	Change in % of vote	Votes per seat won
Labour	Tony Blair	627 (Note: Includes 32 Co-operative Party candidates, as part of the Labour-Co-op alliance)	355 (Note: Includes 29 Co-operative Party MPs, as part of the Labour-Co-op alliance)	0	47	–47 (Note: Includes -1 Co-operative Party MPs, as part of the Labour-Co-op alliance)	55.2 (Note: Includes 4.5% for the Co-operative Party, as part of the Labour-Co-op alliance)	9,552,436 (Note: Includes 584,700 for the Co-operative Party, as part of the Labour-Co-op alliance)	35.2 (Note: Includes 2.1% for the Co-operative Party, as part of the Labour-Co-op alliance)	–5.5 (Note: Includes -0.2% for the Co-operative Party, as part of the Labour-Co-op alliance)	26,908 (Note: 18,272 for the Co-operative Party, as part of the Labour-Co-op alliance)
Conservative	Michael Howard	630	198	36	3	+33	30.7	8,784,915	32.4	+0.7	44,368
Liberal Democrats	Charles Kennedy	626	62	16	5	+11	9.6	5,985,454	22.0	+3.8	96,540
UKIP	Roger Knapman	496	0	0	0	0	0.0	605,973	2.2	+0.8	N/A
SNP	Alex Salmond	59	6	2	0	+2	0.9	412,267	1.5	–0.2	68,711
Green	Caroline Lucas and Keith Taylor	182	0	0	0	0	0.0	257,758	1.0	+0.4	N/A
DUP	Ian Paisley	18	9	4	0	+4	1.4	241,856	0.9	+0.2	26,873
BNP	Nick Griffin	119	0	0	0	0	0.0	192,745	0.7	+0.5	N/A
Plaid Cymru	Ieuan Wyn Jones	40	3	0	1	–1	0.5	174,838	0.6	–0.1	58,279
Sinn Féin	Gerry Adams	18	5	1	0	+1	0.8	174,530	0.6	–0.1	34,906
UUP	David Trimble	18	1	0	5	–5	0.2	127,414	0.5	–0.3	127,414
SDLP	Mark Durkan	18	3	1	1	0	0.5	125,626	0.5	–0.1	41,875
Independent	N/A	180	1	1	0	+1	0.2	122,416	0.5	+0.1	122,416
Respect	Linda Smith	26	1	1	0	+1	0.2	68,094	0.3	N/A	68,094
Scottish Socialist	Colin Fox	58	0	0	0	0	0.0	43,514	0.2	–0.1	N/A
Veritas	Robert Kilroy-Silk	65	0	0	0	0	0.0	40,607	0.1	N/A	N/A
Alliance	David Ford	12	0	0	0	0	0.0	28,291	0.1	0.0	N/A
Green	Shiona Baird and Robin Harper	19	0	0	0	0	0.0	25,760	0.1	+0.1	N/A
Socialist Labour	Arthur Scargill	49	0	0	0	0	0.0	20,167	0.1	0.0	N/A
Liberal	Michael Meadowcroft	14	0	0	0	0	0.0	19,068	0.1	0.0	N/A
Health Concern	Richard Taylor	1	1	0	0	0	0.2	18,739	0.1	0.0	18,739
Speaker	N/A	1	1	0	0	0	0.2	15,153	0.1	0.0	15,153
English Democrat	Robin Tilbrook	24	0	0	0	0	0.0	15,149	0.1	N/A	N/A
Socialist	Peter Taaffe	17	0	0	0	0	0.0	9,398	0.0	N/A	N/A
National Front	Tom Holmes	13	0	0	0	0	0.0	8,079	0.0	N/A	N/A
Legalise Cannabis	Alun Buffry	21	0	0	0	0	0.0	6,950	0.0	0.0	N/A
Monster Raving Loony	Howling Laud Hope	19	0	0	0	0	0.0	6,311	0.0	0.0	N/A
Community Action	Peter Franzen	3	0	0	0	0	0.0	5,984	0.0	N/A	N/A
Christian Vote	George Hargreaves	10	0	0	0	0	0.0	4,004	0.0	N/A	N/A
Mebyon Kernow	Dick Cole	4	0	0	0	0	0.0	3,552	0.0	0.0	N/A
Forward Wales	John Marek	6	0	0	0	0	0.0	3,461	0.0	N/A	N/A
CPA	Alan Craig	9	0	0	0	0	0.0	3,291	0.0	N/A	N/A
Rainbow Dream Ticket	Rainbow George Weiss	23	0	0	0	0	0.0	2,463	0.0	N/A	N/A
Community Group	Martin Williams	1	0	0	0	0	0.0	2,365	0.0	N/A	N/A
Ashfield Independents	Roy Adkins	1	0	0	0	0	0.0	2,292	0.0	N/A	N/A
Alliance for Green Socialism	Mike Davies	5	0	0	0	0	0.0	1,978	0.0	N/A	N/A
Residents Association of London	Malvin Brown	2	0	0	0	0	0.0	1,850	0.0	N/A	N/A
Workers' Party	Seán Garland	6	0	0	0	0	0.0	1,669	0.0	0.0	N/A
Socialist Environmental	Goretti Horgan	1	0	0	0	0	0.0	1,649	0.0	N/A	N/A
Scottish Unionist	Daniel Houston	1	0	0	0	0	0.0	1,266	0.0	0.0	N/A
Workers Revolutionary	Sheila Torrance	10	0	0	0	0	0.0	1,241	0.0	0.0	N/A
New England	Michael Tibby	1	0	0	0	0	0.0	1,224	0.0	N/A	N/A
Communist	Robert Griffiths	6	0	0	0	0	0.0	1,124	0.0	0.0	N/A
Community Group		1	0	0	0	0	0.0	1,118	0.0	N/A	N/A
Peace and Progress	Chris Cooper	3	0	0	0	0	0.0	1,036	0.0	N/A	N/A
Scottish Senior Citizens	John Swinburne	2	0	0	0	0	0.0	1,017	0.0	N/A	N/A
Your Party	Daniel Thompson	2	0	0	0	0	0.0	1,006	0.0	N/A	N/A
SOS! Northampton	Yvonne Dale	2	0	0	0	0	0.0	932	0.0	N/A	N/A
Ind. Working Class	None	1	0	0	0	0	0.0	892	0.0	N/A	N/A
Democratic Labour	Brian Powell	1	0	0	0	0	0.0	770	0.0	N/A	N/A
British Public Party	Kashif Rana	1	0	0	0	0	0.0	763	0.0	N/A	N/A
Free Scotland Party	Brian Nugent	3	0	0	0	0	0.0	743	0.0	N/A	N/A
Pensioners Party Scotland	George Rodger	1	0	0	0	0	0.0	716	0.0	N/A	N/A
Publican Party	Kit Fraser and Don Lawson	1	0	0	0	0	0.0	678	0.0	N/A	N/A
English Independence Party	Andrew Constantine	1	0	0	0	0	0.0	654	0.0	N/A	N/A
Socialist Unity	None	2	0	0	0	0	0.0	581	0.0	N/A	N/A
Local Community Party	Jack Crossfield	1	0	0	0	0	0.0	570	0.0	N/A	N/A
Clause 28	David Braid	3	0	0	0	0	0.0	516	0.0	N/A	N/A
UK Community Issues Party	Michael Osman	3	0	0	0	0	0.0	502	0.0	N/A	N/A
Total			646				Turnout	27,148,510	61.4		42,026
