= 1997 North Down Borough Council election =

Local government election in Northern Ireland

← 1993	21 May 1997	2001 →

All 25 seats to North Down Borough Council 13 seats needed for a majority
	First party	Second party	Third party
Party	UUP	Alliance	UK Unionist
Seats won	6	6	3
Seat change	0	▲1	▲3
	Fourth party	Fifth party	Sixth party
Party	DUP	NI Conservatives	PUP
Seats won	2	2	2
Seat change	▼1	▼2	▲2
	Seventh party	Eighth party	Ninth party
Party	Independent	Ind. Unionist	UPUP
Seats won	2	2	0
Seat change	0	▼1	▼2
- Results by district electoral area, shaded by First Preference Votes.

Elections to North Down Borough Council were held on 21 May 1997 on the same day as the other Northern Irish local government elections. The election used four district electoral areas to elect a total of 25 councillors.

== Election results ==
North Down Borough Council Election Result 1997
Party	Seats	Gains	Losses	Net gain/loss	Seats %	Votes %	Votes	+/−
UUP	6	0	0	0	24.0	22.4	4,216	▲3.7
Alliance	6	1	0	▲1	24.0	22.1	4,152	▼0.6
UK Unionist	3	3	0	▲3	12.0	9.3	1,798	New
Ind. Unionist	2	0	1	▼1	8.0	12.5	2,349	▲0.1
Independent	2	1	1	0	8.0	12.1	2,284	▼0.9
DUP	2	1	2	▼1	8.0	9.4	1,762	▼6.8
NI Conservatives	2	0	2	▼2	8.0	8.6	1,372	▼3.8
PUP	2	2	0	▲2	8.0	4.2	783	▲4.2
Ulster Democratic	0	0	0	0	0.0	0.6	131	New

Note: "Votes" are the first preference votes.

== Districts summary ==
Results of the North Down Borough Council election, 1997 by district
Ward	%	Cllrs	%	Cllrs	%	Cllrs	%	Cllrs	%	Cllrs	%	Cllrs	%	Cllrs	Total Cllrs
Ward	UUP		Alliance		UKUP		DUP		Conservative		PUP		Others		Total Cllrs
Abbey	20.6	1	16.5	1	16.5	1	12.0	1	15.2	1	8.7	1	10.5	0	6
Ballyholme and Groomsport	21.2	2	20.8	1	7.8	1	6.5	0	8.8	1	0.0	0	34.9	2	7
Bangor West	25.1	2	21.0	2	9.5	1	9.3	0	2.1	0	8.2	1	24.8	1	7
Holywood	22.3	1	31.0	2	4.1	0	10.8	1	4.3	0	0.0	0	27.5	1	5
Total	22.4	6	22.1	6	9.3	3	9.4	2	7.3	2	4.2	2	25.3	4	25

== Districts results ==
=== Abbey ===
1993: 2 x UPUP, 1 x DUP, 1 x Alliance, 1 x UUP, 1 x Conservative
1997: 1 x UUP, 1 x Alliance, 1 x UKUP, 1 x Conservative, 1 x DUP, 1 x PUP
1993-1997 Change: UKUP and PUP gain from UPUP (two seats)

Abbey - 6 seats
Party	Candidate	FPv%	Count						
Party	Candidate	FPv%	1	2	3	4	5	6	7
Alliance	Stephen Farry*	16.53%	650						
UK Unionist	Valerie Kinghan*	16.53%	650						
NI Conservatives	Ann Thompson*	15.18%	597						
DUP	Ivy Cooling*	11.98%	471	474.06	498.42	503.7	528.44	610.44	
UUP	Roberta Dunlop	12.26%	482	495.86	516.58	525.1	532.24	587.24	
PUP	Stewart Currie	8.75%	344	352.46	357.92	359.9	417.26	483.96	505.96
UUP	Karl McLean	8.34%	328	339.34	354.74	363.44	386.52	446.3	465.3
Ind. Unionist	Cecil Braniff*	4.20%	165	176.7	186.78	190.08	198.42		
Independent	William Gordon	2.92%	115	147.58	151.36	152.8	155.66		
Ulster Democratic	Richard McCullough	3.33%	131	134.06	137.84	138.92			
Electorate: 13,415 Valid: 3,933 (29.32%) Spoilt: 93 Quota: 562 Turnout: 4,026 (30.01%)

=== Ballyholme and Groomsport ===
1993: 2 x UUP, 2 x Independent Unionist, 1 x Alliance, 1 x DUP, 1 x Conservative
1997: 2 x UUP, 2 x Independent Unionist, 1 x Alliance, 1 x Conservative, 1 x UKUP
1993-1997 Change: UKUP gain from DUP

Ballyholme and Groomsport - 7 seats
Party	Candidate	FPv%	Count							
Party	Candidate	FPv%	1	2	3	4	5	6	7	8
Ind. Unionist	Alan Chambers*	21.59%	1,218							
Alliance	Marsden Fitzsimons*	13.65%	770							
UUP	Leslie Cree*	13.38%	755							
Ind. Unionist	Austen Lennon*	13.10%	739							
UK Unionist	Elizabeth Roche	7.80%	440	516.93	517.89	519.39	523.74	534.44	556.02	714.7
UUP	Ian Henry*	3.16%	178	232.39	234.15	240.69	242.89	338.96	515.62	709.27
NI Conservatives	Bruce Mulligan*	8.83%	498	568.56	572.96	575.96	580.11	601.74	618.19	652.24
Alliance	Gavin Walker	7.20%	406	479.99	529.75	530.83	532.13	546.44	557.33	564.49
DUP	Marie Cree	6.65%	375	464.67	465.23	470.15	472.3	485.14	502.06	
UUP	Ronald Dorrian	1.88%	106	193.71	194.99	218.39	220.89	272.64		
UUP	James Kingan	2.77%	156	209.9	211.02	214.5	217.45			
Electorate: 16,947 Valid: 5,641 (33.29%) Spoilt: 99 Quota: 706 Turnout: 5,740 (33.87%)

=== Bangor West ===
1993: 2 x UUP, 2 x Alliance, 1 x DUP, 1 x Conservative, 1 x Independent Unionist
1997: 2 x UUP, 2 x Alliance, 1 x UKUP, 1 x PUP, 1 x Independent
1993-1997 Change: UKUP, PUP and Independent gain from DUP, Conservative and Independent Unionist

Bangor West - 7 seats
Party	Candidate	FPv%	Count											
Party	Candidate	FPv%	1	2	3	4	5	6	7	8	9	10	11	12
Independent	Brian Wilson*	20.32%	1,090											
UUP	Roy Bradford*	13.03%	699											
Alliance	Eileen Bell*	12.34%	662	700.61										
Alliance	Anne Wilson	7.21%	387	661.56	668.73	679.23								
UUP	Marion Smith	8.56%	459	480.45	481.45	481.45	485.97	490.95	510.32	517.18	657.86	788.86		
UK Unionist	William Keery	9.49%	509	528.11	528.11	529.01	530.89	536.61	550.73	564.2	585.85	640.36	662.36	663.86
PUP	Ernest Steele	8.18%	439	444.46	444.46	444.76	445.4	451.08	458.42	468.42	480.74	502.9	527.9	530.3
DUP	Robert Gordon	5.74%	308	310.73	311.73	311.73	312.89	312.89	317.28	466.96	490.35	508.76	523.76	523.76
Ind. Unionist	Ian Sinclair*	4.23%	227	246.11	246.5	247.1	247.62	268.22	300.12	304.2	324.05			
UUP	Royston Davies	3.54%	190	201.7	202.7	203	220.32	229.5	246.48	249.48				
DUP	Alan Graham	3.56%	191	195.68	196.07	196.07	196.47	196.77	197.77					
NI Conservatives	Julian Robertson	2.09%	112	116.68	118.07	118.37	119.05	125.03						
Alliance	Derek Bell	1.42%	76	85.75	87.75	103.65	103.93							
Independent	Robert Mooney	0.28%	15	18.12										
Electorate: 15,442 Valid: 5,364 (34.74%) Spoilt: 116 Quota: 671 Turnout: 5,480 (35.49%)

=== Holywood ===
1993: 2 x Independent, 1 x Alliance, 1 x UUP, 1 x Conservative
1997: 2 x Alliance, 1 x UUP, 1 x DUP, 1 x Independent
1993-1997 Change: Alliance and DUP gain from Conservative and Independent

Holywood - 5 seats
Party	Candidate	FPv%	Count					
Party	Candidate	FPv%	1	2	3	4	5	6
UUP	Ellie McKay*	22.31%	863					
Alliance	Susan O'Brien*	19.82%	767					
Independent	Dennis Ogborn*	14.09%	545	594.66	608.26	630.3	677.5	
DUP	Gordon Dunne	10.78%	417	474.72	477.12	570.44	644.08	694.08
Alliance	Richard Good	11.22%	434	449.08	544.92	560.42	607.8	643.48
Independent	James White*	7.21%	279	297.2	300.4	309.18	317.72	442.62
Independent	Bobby Irvine	6.20%	240	248.58	251.3	259.3	274.38	
NI Conservatives	Jennifer Cumming	4.26%	165	199.58	201.5	233.88		
UK Unionist	Jeffrey Dudgeon	4.11%	159	187.6	188.24			
Electorate: 10,434 Valid: 3,869 (37.08%) Spoilt: 52 Quota: 645 Turnout: 3,921 (37.58%)
