= Women in Northern Ireland =

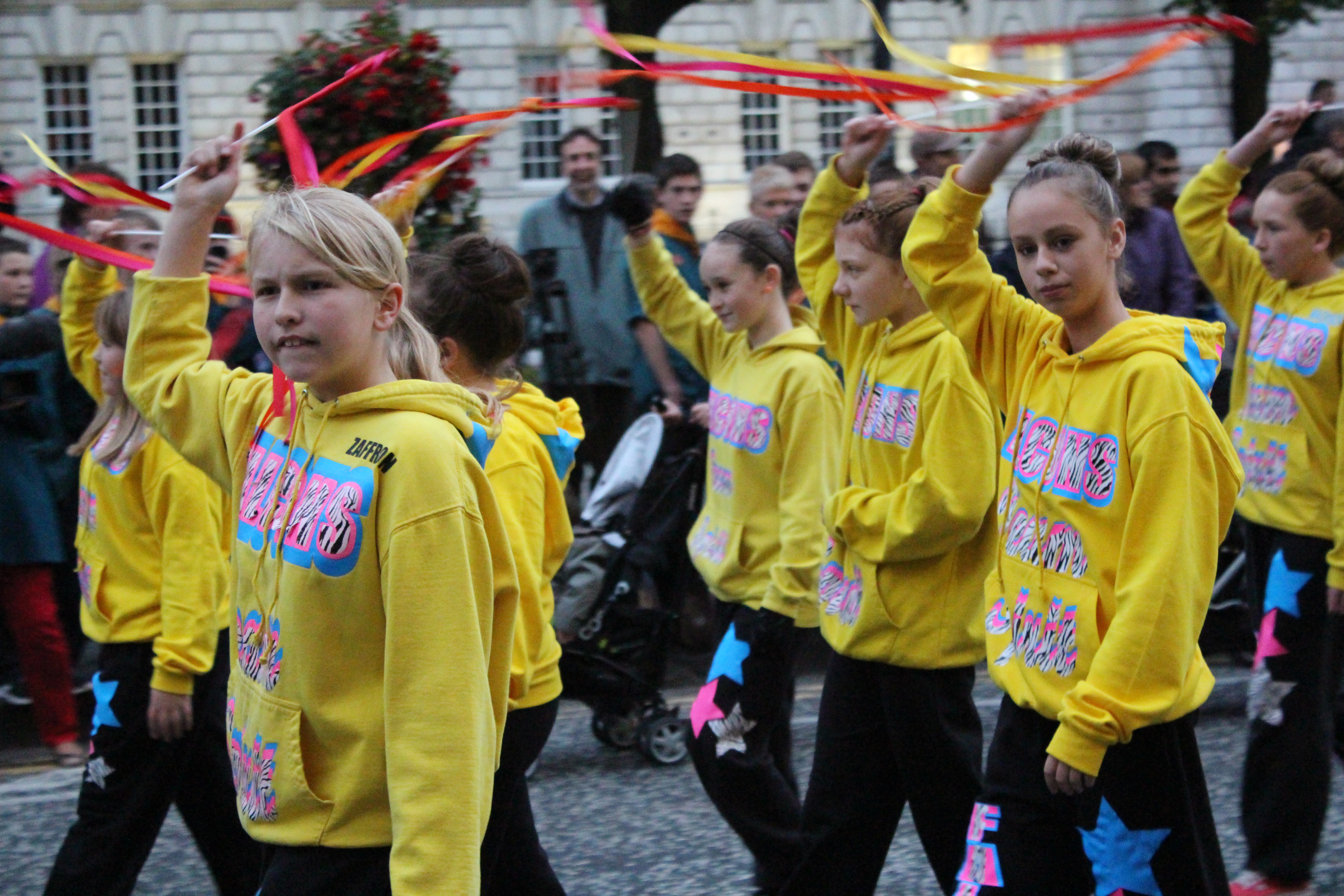
Teenage girls from Northern Ireland participating in a parade during the Chinese Mid-Autumn Festival held in Belfast in September 2012.

Women in Northern Ireland are women who live in or are from Northern Ireland.

== Historic feminism ==
Irish women have had a long history of involvement in political movements throughout Ireland. In 1798, women were involved in the United Irish movement in a number of ways. For instance, they transported arms, kept the male Irish rebels fed and clothed, and would help to defend their camps. United Irish meetings were frequently held at women-owned public houses as well. The 1960s also saw heavy involvement from women in Northern Ireland in different civil rights campaigns. Irish women engaged in and organized numerous protests regarding housing and employment discrimination within the Catholic communities in Derry and Belfast. The emergence of The Troubles and the subsequent internment of Catholic men in August 1971 greatly impacted the lives of these women. Women began to represent the men in their community in a number of protests as well as develop strategies to warn their community of the army's location. Those women who would warn the community would later be known as 'hen patrols.'

== Women during The Troubles ==
Women played an active role throughout The Troubles as a part of both the republican and unionist sides. Women's traditional roles as both mother and homemaker made them particularly effective as symbols of a wider conflict.

=== Ulster loyalism ===
Women were involved in Loyalist movements but were often excluded. Women frequently formed separate women's Loyalist organizations separate from more major Loyalist paramilitary organizations. Loyalist paramilitary violence was often focused on protection and defense against Republican paramilitarism and political change, meaning that women's participation in Unionist and Loyalist paramilitarism was hidden and discouraged because it offered a change to established status quo (similar to changes presented by the IRA). Many Loyalist women engaged in political processes through traditional political advocacy as opposed to paramilitary violence, particularly in rural areas. Due to their exclusion in the Troubles, as well as after during peace negotiations, many Loyalist women oppose the effects of the Northern Ireland peace process.

=== Republicanism ===
Many women joined the IRA to fight for Irish statehood and the rights of Catholics. British Army and Northern Irish police forces were often hesitant and unwilling to search women thoroughly, making them particularly useful for concealing arms. The Women in the IRA have reported low levels of sexism and have frequently reported feeling a strong sense of sisterhood, a strong contrast to the experience of women in Unionist movements. Women in the IRA were frequently arrested and jailed in inhumane conditions, becoming frequent victims of assault, mistreatment, and were denied essential needs, such as menstrual products. Women in the IRA were also far more visible than their Loyalist counterparts. Dolours Price was one of the most well-known and prolific female members of the Provisional Irish Republican Army and became heavily associated with the paramilitary violence of the IRA during the Troubles.

== Criminal justice system ==
The latter half of the twentieth century saw a dramatic increase of women in Northern Ireland entering the criminal justice system. This was largely due to the conflicts between the republicans and unionists. Prior to 1976, the women who were imprisoned as a result of these conflicts were labeled political prisoners. When the policy of special categorization ended in 1976, these women were all labeled terrorists under the law. These women were mostly engaging in civil disobedient acts such as rent strikes, however many of them were brought into prison through the Emergency Powers Act with, 'aiding and abetting terrorism.'

Among the notable women of Northern Ireland were Geraldine O'Regan and May Blood, a Catholic and a Protestant respectively. Both of them were active community leaders in Belfast, the administrative capital and largest city of Northern Ireland. Women in Northern Ireland have a variety of concerns in regards to their overall treatment in society. Some areas of concern include domestic violence, poverty, poor housing conditions, unemployment, and a wide array of larger political issues.

=== The Roisin McAliskey case ===
The arrest and incarceration of Belfast native Roisin McAliskey in 1996 gained international attention. Although never charged with a crime, McAliskey was reportedly interrogated for six days. McAliskey's detainment sparked outrage from a number of human rights organizations due to her treatment as a pregnant woman.

== Present day ==
=== Politics ===
Since the ceasefire of 1994, funding from the European Union enabled a number of community based women's group to come to fruition in Northern Ireland. The Northern Ireland Women's Coalition was a cross-community political party which ran from 1996 to 2006. Monica McWilliams and Pearl Sagar were both influential leaders in the Women's Coalition. The party was particularly influential in facilitating peace talks and drafting the Good Friday Agreement as well as garnering support for the referendum on its passage The Women's Coalition was formed primarily to address specific issues considered more relevant and important to women, such as integrated education and communities, as well as to push for more women's representation in Northern Irish politics. However, many of the reforms that were pushed for by the Women's Coalition were not implemented and enforced long-term. The Women's Coalition was also unable to secure longer gains in women's political representation.

Since January 2020, the posts of First Minister and/or Deputy First Minister of the Northern Ireland Executive have been held by a woman.

=== Domestic violence in Northern Ireland ===
Northern Ireland continues to have some of the highest rates of femicide and domestic violence within Europe, a fact that has caused gender-based violence in Northern Ireland to be called an "epidemic". In early 2026, the Police Service of Northern Ireland issued a statement on the perceived ‘least safest place in Europe’ figures from 2015-20, noting that during that time period, Finland, Switzerland and Romania had higher instances of violence against women.

Thirty-one women were victims of femicide in the years 2019–2024, a stark and unique trend among European nations. During 2024, there were seven domestic abuse related murders in NI (more than double from the previous year); six of these seven were women.

In 2023, there were 33,071 domestic abuse incidents in NI, with 20,691 of them being identified as crimes. In 2024, there were 30,509 domestic abuse incidents, including 18,656 crimes. This is a higher rate (1 in 65) than England/Wales (1 in 70), Scotland (1 in 86) or the Republic of Ireland (1 in 78).

During 2024/25, 67% of all domestic abuse crime victims were female; however, the number of female victims had almost doubled since 2004/05.

During 2025, there were 30,793 domestic abuse incidents in Northern Ireland, including 18,524 recorded crimes; there was an increase in harassment and stalking, but a decrease in violence and injury.

Many historians and psychologists have connected the relatively high rate of domestic abuse in NI to psychological effects caused by The Troubles. Over 60% of Northern Irish people in 2025 experience adverse childhood experiences, and over 30% have trauma linked to violent conflict.

Statistics from Ulster University suggested that 98% of NI women had experienced abuse; over 70% of under-18s had experienced violence.

== Education ==
From 2018 to 2021, females in NI performed better than males in GCSE and A-level exams. At the same time, females were half as likely as males to start an apprenticeship and were less likely to qualify in a STEM area of study.

== Employment ==
In 2021, women made up 49% of the workforce and 37% of managers/directors.

== Impact outside Northern Ireland ==
Women in Northern Ireland have impacted the worlds of science, arts, sports, politics and law.

== See also ==
- Abortion in Northern Ireland
- Demographics of Northern Ireland
- Derry Girls
- LGBT rights in Northern Ireland
- Prostitution in Northern Ireland
- Same-sex marriage in Northern Ireland
- Segregation in Northern Ireland

=== People ===
- Sheree Atcheson
- May Blood
- Jenny Bristow
- Jocelyn Bell Burnell
- Anna Burns
- Amanda Burton
- Lucy Caldwell
- Chipzel
- Rosemary Coogan
- Nadine Coyle
- Roma Downey
- Candida Doyle
- Michelle Fairley
- Arlene Foster
- Louise Harra
- Joanne Hogg
- Gloria Hunniford
- Christine Lampard
- Helen Lewis (choreographer)
- Anna Lo
- Paula Malcomson
- Stephanie Meadow
- Lucia Mee
- Emma Moran
- Susan Morrice
- Mary McAleese
- Inez McCormack
- Michelle O'Neill
- Annie Yellowe Palma
- Mary Peters (athlete)
- Clare Smyth
- Robyn Stewart
- Frances Tomelty
- Juliet Turner
- Helen Waddell
- Jo Zebedee
