= Holywood (District Electoral Area) =

District electoral areas in North Down, Northern Ireland

Holywood DEA (1993-2014) within North Down

Holywood was one of the four district electoral areas in North Down, Northern Ireland which existed from 1985 to 2014. The district elected five members to North Down Borough Council and formed part of the North Down constituencies for the Northern Ireland Assembly and UK Parliament.

It was created for the 1985 local elections, replacing North Down Area D which had existed since 1973, and contained the wards of Craigavad, Cultra, Holywood Demesne, Holywood Priory and Loughview. It was abolished for the 2014 local elections and replaced by the Holywood and Clandeboye DEA.

== Councillors ==
Election	Councillor (party)	Councillor (party)	Councillor (party)	Councillor (party)	Councillor (party)
2011	Andrew Muir (Alliance)	Laurence Thompson (Alliance)	Ellie McKay (UUP)	Jennifer Gilmour (DUP)	Gordon Dunne (DUP)
2005	David Alderdice (Alliance)	Ian Parsley (Alliance)	Ellie McKay (UUP)	Diana Peacocke (UUP)	Gordon Dunne (DUP)
2001	Susan O'Brien (Alliance)	Dennis Ogborn (Independent)	Ellie McKay (UUP)	Diana Peacocke (UUP)	Gordon Dunne (DUP)
1997	Susan O'Brien (Alliance)	Dennis Ogborn (Independent)	Ellie McKay (UUP)	Richard Good (Alliance)	Gordon Dunne (DUP)
1993	Susan O'Brien (Alliance)	Dennis Ogborn (Independent)	Ellie McKay (UUP)	Laurence Kennedy (Conservative)	James White (Independent)
1989	Susan O'Brien (Alliance)	Dennis Ogborn (Independent)	Ellie McKay (UUP)	Laurence Kennedy (Conservative)	Gordon Dunne (DUP)
1985	Susan O'Brien (Alliance)	Michael Clarke (Alliance)	Ellie McKay (UUP)	John Auld (UUP)	Gordon Dunne (DUP)

== 2011 election ==
2005: 2 x UUP, 2 x Alliance, 1 x DUP

2011: 2 x Alliance, 2 x DUP, 1 x UUP

2005-2011 change: DUP gain from UUP

Holywood - 5 seats
Party	Candidate	FPv%	Count					
Party	Candidate	FPv%	1	2	3	4	5	6
DUP	Gordon Dunne*	24.79%	1,081					
Alliance	Andrew Muir	22.73%	991					
UUP	Ellie McKay*	15.48%	675	739.94				
Alliance	Laurence Thompson	9.20%	401	414.26	645.65	810.65		
DUP	Jennifer Gilmour	5.78%	252	449.52	503.03	627.22	658.54	668.66
Green (NI)	John Barry	12.04%	525	533.5	550.78	611.2	663.4	665.6
UUP	Gillian McGimpsey	5.73%	250	262.92	268.05			
NI Conservatives	David O'Callaghan	4.24%	185	189.76	192.73			
Electorate: 9,433 Valid: 4,360 (46.22%) Spoilt: 76 Quota: 727 Turnout: 4,436 (47.03%)

== 2005 election ==
2001: 2 x UUP, 1 x Alliance, 1 x DUP, 1 x Independent

2005: 2 x UUP, 2 x Alliance, 1 x DUP

2001-2005 change: Alliance gain from Independent

Holywood - 5 seats
Party	Candidate	FPv%	Count				
Party	Candidate	FPv%	1	2	3	4	5
DUP	Gordon Dunne*	25.42%	1,282				
Alliance	David Alderdice	24.58%	1,240				
UUP	Ellie McKay*	19.81%	999				
UUP	Diana Peacocke*	11.95%	603	954			
Alliance	Ian Parsley	6.80%	343	379.45	714.01	830.65	903.55
Green (NI)	John Barry	11.44%	577	629.65	691.19	731.75	771.35
Electorate: 9,107 Valid: 5,044 (55.39%) Spoilt: 83 Quota: 841 Turnout: 5,127 (56.30%)

== 2001 election ==
1997: 2 x Alliance, 1 x UUP, 1 x DUP, 1 x Independent

2001: 2 x UUP, 1 x Alliance, 1 x DUP, 1 x Independent

1997-2001 change: UUP gain from Alliance

Holywood - 5 seats
Party	Candidate	FPv%	Count					
Party	Candidate	FPv%	1	2	3	4	5	6
UUP	Ellie McKay*	21.98%	1,346					
Alliance	Susan O'Brien*	17.47%	1,070					
DUP	Gordon Dunne*	14.96%	916	954.25	998.5	1,021.5		
Independent	Dennis Ogborn*	13.31%	815	863.75	868.5	905.75	977.5	1,110.5
UUP	Diana Peacocke	8.02%	491	673.25	696.25	764.25	806.75	904.5
NI Women's Coalition	Norma Heaton	8.31%	509	521.75	525.75	539.5	575	751.25
Alliance	Laurence Thompson	7.12%	436	448.5	453.25	472.5	513.5	
Independent	Robert Irvine	3.79%	232	241	259.25	270.5		
NI Conservatives	Lindsay Cumming	3.07%	188	196.5	202.75			
PUP	David Rose	1.99%	122	126				
Electorate: 10,063 Valid: 6,125 (60.87%) Spoilt: 124 Quota: 1,021 Turnout: 6,249 (62.10%)

== 1993 election ==
1993: 2 x Independent, 1 x Alliance, 1 x UUP, 1 x Conservative

1997: 2 x Alliance, 1 x UUP, 1 x DUP, 1 x Independent

1993-1997 change: Alliance and DUP gain from Conservative and Independent

Holywood - 5 seats
Party	Candidate	FPv%	Count					
Party	Candidate	FPv%	1	2	3	4	5	6
UUP	Ellie McKay*	22.31%	863					
Alliance	Susan O'Brien*	19.82%	767					
Independent	Dennis Ogborn*	14.09%	545	594.66	608.26	630.3	677.5	
DUP	Gordon Dunne	10.78%	417	474.72	477.12	570.44	644.08	694.08
Alliance	Richard Good	11.22%	434	449.08	544.92	560.42	607.8	643.48
Independent	James White*	7.21%	279	297.2	300.4	309.18	317.72	442.62
Independent	Bobby Irvine	6.20%	240	248.58	251.3	259.3	274.38	
NI Conservatives	Jennifer Cumming	4.26%	165	199.58	201.5	233.88		
UK Unionist	Jeffrey Dudgeon	4.11%	159	187.6	188.24			
Electorate: 10,434 Valid: 3,869 (37.08%) Spoilt: 52 Quota: 645 Turnout: 3,921 (37.58%)

== 1993 election ==
1989: 1 x Alliance, 1 x Conservative, 1 x UUP, 1 x DUP, 1 x Independent

1993: 2 x Independent, 1 x Alliance, 1 x UUP, 1 x Conservative

1989-1993 change: Independent gain from DUP

Holywood - 5 seats
Party	Candidate	FPv%	Count					
Party	Candidate	FPv%	1	2	3	4	5	6
Independent	Dennis Ogborn*	19.70%	871					
UUP	Ellie McKay*	18.89%	835					
Alliance	Susan O'Brien*	15.27%	675	721.24	723.73	738		
Independent	James White	7.69%	340	353.76	358.92	366.84	623.76	737.76
NI Conservatives	Laurence Kennedy*	9.36%	414	442.48	524.56	551.92	565.56	680.68
DUP	Gordon Dunne*	11.83%	523	537.4	548.88	582	600.96	615.76
Alliance	John Coates	7.67%	339	354.68	364.84	369.88	382.44	
Independent	Robert Irvine	7.01%	310	318.16	322.16	327.8		
NI Conservatives	Lindsay Cumming	2.58%	114	117.68				
Electorate: 10,411 Valid: 4,421 (42.46%) Spoilt: 89 Quota: 737 Turnout: 4,510 (43.32%)

== 1989 election ==
1985: 2 x UUP, 2 x Alliance, 1 x DUP

1989: 1 x Alliance, 1 x Conservative, 1 x UUP, 1 x DUP, 1 x Independent

1985-1989 change: Conservative and Independent gain from UUP and Alliance

Holywood - 5 seats
Party	Candidate	FPv%	Count					
Party	Candidate	FPv%	1	2	3	4	5	6
NI Conservatives	Laurence Kennedy	16.14%	775	852				
UUP	Ellie McKay*	12.27%	589	641	694	704.12	1,035.12	
Independent	Dennis Ogborn	14.47%	695	712	755	764.2	804.2	
DUP	Gordon Dunne*	11.68%	561	564	576	578.76	659.28	805.28
Alliance	Susan O'Brien*	13.74%	660	670	696	701.52	732.96	754.96
Alliance	Paul De Haan	11.50%	552	559	585	592.36	626.12	659.12
UUP	John Auld*	9.85%	473	498	549	564.64		
NI Conservatives	Alice Kennedy	5.60%	269	299				
NI Conservatives	Michael Weir	2.81%	135					
UUP	Ian Sinclair*	1.94%	93					
Electorate: 10,290 Valid: 4,802 (46.67%) Spoilt: 116 Quota: 801 Turnout: 4,918 (47.79%)

== 1985 election ==
1985: 2 x UUP, 2 x Alliance, 1 x DUP

Holywood - 5 seats
Party	Candidate	FPv%	Count			
Party	Candidate	FPv%	1	2	3	4
UUP	Ellie McKay*	16.36%	786	944		
UUP	John Auld*	16.32%	784	882		
DUP	Gordon Dunne*	13.62%	654	813		
Alliance	Susan O'Brien*	15.93%	765	793	819	
Alliance	Michael Clarke*	14.62%	702	720	738	758
Independent	Dennis Ogborn	12.18%	585	629	675	694
UPUP	James White	6.45%	310			
UUP	Roger Lomas	2.39%	115			
DUP	Elizabeth Graham	2.12%	102			
Electorate: 9,824 Valid: 4,803 (48.89%) Spoilt: 93 Quota: 801 Turnout: 4,896 (49.84%)
