= Kilmurray (surname) =

Kilmurray is a surname, commonly used in English-speaking countries. Notable people with the surname include:

- Avila Kilmurray (born 1952), community activist and peacebuilder in Northern Ireland
- Kevin Kilmurray (1950–2022), Irish Gaelic footballer
- Ted Kilmurray (1934–2025), Australian rules footballer
