= Ballyholme and Groomsport (District Electoral Area) =

District electoral areas in North Down, Northern Ireland

Ballyholme and Groomsport DEA (1993-2014) within North Down

Ballyholme and Groomsport was one of the four district electoral areas in North Down, Northern Ireland which existed from 1985 to 2014. The district elected six members to North Down Borough Council until 1993 and seven members until 2014, and formed part of the North Down constituencies for the Northern Ireland Assembly and UK Parliament.

It was created for the 1985 local elections, replacing North Down Area A which had existed since 1973, and contained the wards of Ballyholme, Ballymaconnell, Ballymagee, Broadway, Churchill and Groomsport. In 1993 it gained an additional ward, Ballycrochan. It was abolished for the 2014 local elections and mainly replaced by the Bangor East and Donaghadee DEA.

== Councillors ==
Election	Councillor (Party)	Councillor (Party)	Councillor (Party)	Councillor (Party)	Councillor (Party)	Councillor (Party)	Councillor (Party)
2011	Christine Bower (Alliance)	Ian Henry (UUP)	Peter Martin (DUP)	Peter Weir (DUP)	Alex Easton (DUP)	Alan Chambers (Independent Unionist)	Austen Lennon (Independent Unionist)
2005	Marsden Fitzsimons (Alliance)	Ian Henry (UUP)	Leslie Cree (UUP)	Peter Weir (DUP)	Alex Easton (DUP)	Alan Chambers (Independent Unionist)	Austen Lennon (Independent Unionist)
2001	Marsden Fitzsimons (Alliance)	Ian Henry (UUP)	Leslie Cree (UUP)	Patricia Wallace (NI Women's Coalition)	Alex Easton (DUP)	Alan Chambers (Independent Unionist)	Austen Lennon (Independent Unionist)
1997	Marsden Fitzsimons (Alliance)	Ian Henry (UUP)	Leslie Cree (UUP)	Bruce Mulligan (Conservative)/ (UUP)	Elizabeth Roche (UKUP)	Alan Chambers (Independent Unionist)	Austen Lennon (Independent Unionist)
1993	Marsden Fitzsimons (Alliance)	Ian Henry (UUP)	Leslie Cree (UUP)	Bruce Mulligan (Conservative)/ (UUP)	Raymond Stewart (DUP)	Alan Chambers (Independent Unionist)	Austen Lennon (Independent Unionist)
1989	Jane Copeland (Alliance)	Ivan Thompson (Conservative)	Leslie Cree (UUP)	Bruce Mulligan (Conservative)/ (UUP)	Alan Leslie (DUP)	Edmund Mills (Independent Unionist)	6 seats 1985–1993
1985	Jane Copeland (Alliance)	Donald Hayes (Alliance)	Samuel Hamilton (UUP)	Bruce Mulligan (Conservative)/ (UUP)	Alan Leslie (DUP)	Edmund Mills (Independent Unionist)	6 seats 1985–1993

== 2011 Election ==
2005: 2 x DUP, 2 x UUP, 2 x Independent, 1 x Alliance

2011: 3 x DUP, 2 x Independent, 1 x Alliance, 1 x UUP

2005-2011 Change: DUP gain from UUP

Ballyholme and Groomsport - 6 seats
Party	Candidate	FPv%	Count										
Party	Candidate	FPv%	1	2	3	4	5	6	7	8	9	10	11
DUP	Alex Easton*	22.06%	1,812										
Independent	Alan Chambers*	18.03%	1,481										
DUP	Peter Weir*	9.28%	762	1,048.88									
DUP	Peter Martin	6.44%	529	903.88	980.72	997.16	1,019.52	1,053.52					
UUP	Ian Henry*	5.04%	414	434.68	479.56	484.32	547.32	586.58	659.86	684	687	1,100	
Alliance	Christine Bower	7.38%	606	615.68	648.32	654.32	662.88	690.7	731.16	854.1	856.1	897.26	911.26
Independent	Austen Lennon*	6.12%	503	532.48	615.44	619.44	627.78	660.02	740.06	812.14	816.14	844.18	854.18
Alliance	Adam Harbinson	6.37%	523	533.12	570.52	575.52	586.98	617.8	651.34	764.28	767.28	794.66	801.66
UUP	Colin Breen	5.64%	463	478.84	514.2	524.88	572.26	597.82	624.78	654.14	657.14		
Green (NI)	Paul Roberts	4.75%	390	392.2	408.86	418.56	422.44	449.78	472.82				
Independent	Roberta Dunlop*	2.71%	223	233.56	307.34	319.22	324.9	351.06					
NI Conservatives	David Symington	2.86%	235	241.16	258.16	272.6	284.94						
UUP	Francis McCully	2.11%	173	180.04	198.4	205.08							
UKIP	Pat Toms	1.23%	101	107.6	113.38								
Electorate: 17,062 Valid: 8,215 (48.15%) Spoilt: 107 Quota: 1,027 Turnout: 8,322 (48.78%)

== 2005 Election ==
2001: 2 x Independent, 2 x UUP, 1 x Alliance, 1 x DUP, 1 x Women's Coalition

2005: 2 x DUP, 2 x UUP, 2 x Independent, 1 x Alliance

2001-2005 Change: DUP gain from Women's Coalition

Ballyholme and Groomsport - 6 seats
Party	Candidate	FPv%	Count						
Party	Candidate	FPv%	1	2	3	4	5	6	7
DUP	Peter Weir	16.85%	1,571						
Independent	Alan Chambers*	16.70%	1,557						
DUP	Alex Easton*	15.66%	1,460						
Alliance	Marsden Fitzsimons*	11.14%	1,039	1,054.5	1,119.74	1,147.42	1,160.92	1,486.92	
Independent	Austen Lennon*	6.65%	620	649.45	733.17	839.67	897.27	1,083.3	1,203.3
UUP	Ian Henry*	7.77%	724	804.29	850.49	902.87	967.37	1,056.33	1,094.33
UUP	Leslie Cree*	7.52%	701	778.19	843.15	890.15	952.85	1,015.17	1,053.17
UUP	Mark Brooks	7.18%	669	742.16	781.64	829.49	897.89	941.17	969.17
NI Women's Coalition	Patricia Wallace*	7.92%	738	756.6	792.72	822.64	842.14		
Independent	Henry Gordon	1.89%	176	196.15	235.91				
UK Unionist	Charles Teggart	0.73%	68	147.05	159.65				
Electorate: 16,218 Valid: 9,323 (57.49%) Spoilt: 156 Quota: 1,166 Turnout: 9,479 (58.44%)

== 2001 Election ==
1997: 2 x UUP, 2 x Independent Unionist, 1 x Alliance, 1 x Conservative, 1 x UKUP

2001: 2 x UUP, 2 x Independent, 1 x Alliance, 1 x DUP, 1 x Women's Coalition

1997-2001 Change: DUP and Women's Coalition gain from Conservative and UKUP, Independent Unionists (two seats) become Independent

Ballyholme and Groomsport - 6 seats
Party	Candidate	FPv%	Count										
Party	Candidate	FPv%	1	2	3	4	5	6	7	8	9	10	11
Independent	Alan Chambers*	20.40%	2,099										
UUP	Leslie Cree*	15.85%	1,631										
Independent	Austen Lennon*	13.25%	1,363										
DUP	Alex Easton	11.32%	1,164	1,262.04	1,281.36	1,287.3							
Alliance	Marsden Fitzsimons*	9.13%	939	1,083.48	1,108.89	1,199.99	1,140.67	1,145.65	1,203.14	1,456.14			
UUP	Ian Henry*	5.84%	601	720.11	804.53	812.09	843.14	871.67	928.72	955.95	1,381.64		
NI Women's Coalition	Patricia Wallace	6.39%	657	724.51	731.65	743.05	763.13	767.83	804.97	894.63	926.33	1,077.33	1,106.52
UK Unionist	Henry Gordon	5.55%	571	625.18	637.78	642.34	686.71	902.71	931.35	936.31	989.21	994.21	1,024.45
UUP	Arthur Gadd	1.96%	202	313.8	481.59	488.07	523.97	541.32	576.75	595.96			
Alliance	Gavin Walker	3.27%	336	373.84	376.99	383.35	397.75	401.6	436.34				
Independent	Ernest Steele	2.12%	218	313.89	318.09	329.67	350.62	359.46					
UK Unionist	Joseph Teggart	2.68%	276	306.53	308.42	310.52	329.39						
NI Unionist	Elizabeth Roche*	1.36%	140	164.94	167.25	170.01							
PUP	Brian Lacey	0.87%	90	101.61	104.34	105.96							
Electorate: 17,348 Valid: 10,287 (59.30%) Spoilt: 194 Quota: 1,286 Turnout: 10,481 (60.42%)

== 1997 Election ==
1993: 2 x UUP, 2 x Independent Unionist, 1 x Alliance, 1 x DUP, 1 x Conservative

1997: 2 x UUP, 2 x Independent Unionist, 1 x Alliance, 1 x Conservative, 1 x UKUP

1993-1997 Change: UKUP gain from DUP

Ballyholme and Groomsport - 7 seats
Party	Candidate	FPv%	Count							
Party	Candidate	FPv%	1	2	3	4	5	6	7	8
Ind. Unionist	Alan Chambers*	21.59%	1,218							
Alliance	Marsden Fitzsimons*	13.65%	770							
UUP	Leslie Cree*	13.38%	755							
Ind. Unionist	Austen Lennon*	13.10%	739							
UK Unionist	Elizabeth Roche	7.80%	440	516.93	517.89	519.39	523.74	534.44	556.02	714.7
UUP	Ian Henry*	3.16%	178	232.39	234.15	240.69	242.89	338.96	515.62	709.27
NI Conservatives	Bruce Mulligan*	8.83%	498	568.56	572.96	575.96	580.11	601.74	618.19	652.24
Alliance	Gavin Walker	7.20%	406	479.99	529.75	530.83	532.13	546.44	557.33	564.49
DUP	Marie Cree	6.65%	375	464.67	465.23	470.15	472.3	485.14	502.06	
UUP	Ronald Dorrian	1.88%	106	193.71	194.99	218.39	220.89	272.64		
UUP	James Kingan	2.77%	156	209.9	211.02	214.5	217.45			
Electorate: 16,947 Valid: 5,641 (33.29%) Spoilt: 99 Quota: 706 Turnout: 5,740 (33.87%)

== 1993 Election ==
1989: 2 x Conservative, 1 x UUP, 1 x Alliance, 1 x DUP, 1 x Independent Unionist

1993: 2 x UUP, 2 x Independent Unionist, 1 x Alliance, 1 x DUP, 1 x Conservative

1989-1993 Change: UUP and Independent Unionist gain from Conservative and due to the addition of one seat

Ballyholme and Groomsport - 7 seats
Party	Candidate	FPv%	Count								
Party	Candidate	FPv%	1	2	3	4	5	6	7	8	9
Ind. Unionist	Alan Chambers	32.04%	1,892								
DUP	Raymond Stewart	14.06%	830								
UUP	Leslie Cree*	11.50%	679	925.37							
Alliance	Marsden Fitzsimons	11.04%	652	838.73							
NI Conservatives	Bruce Mulligan*	5.52%	326	389.19	397.38	403.68	408.62	466.44	614.27	683.9	732.7
UUP	Ian Henry	3.57%	211	283.42	384.22	389.26	432.29	437.55	452.2	477.96	719.58
Ind. Unionist	Austen Lennon	4.89%	289	582.94	590.5	600.58	603.7	612.54	617.67	666.14	690.56
Alliance	Siobhan Laird	6.98%	412	421.23	426.9	487.38	488.81	496.07	501.07	538.24	557.49
UUP	James Kingan	3.88%	229	332.66	380.54	385.58	409.89	423.67	428.48	457.33	
Independent	Joseph Thompson	2.22%	131	240.34	247.9	253.36	258.56	268.92	282.65		
NI Conservatives	Bill McLean	2.30%	136	162.27	168.57	169.83	172.04	212.89			
NI Conservatives	William Palmer	2.00%	118	154.21	155.47	159.25	165.62				
Electorate: 15,787 Valid: 5,905 (37.40%) Spoilt: 110 Quota: 739 Turnout: 6,015 (38.10%)

== 1989 Election ==
1985: 2 x UUP, 2 x Alliance, 1 x DUP, 1 x Independent Unionist

1989: 2 x Conservative, 1 x UUP, 1 x Alliance, 1 x DUP, 1 x Independent Unionist

1985-1989 Change: Conservatives (two seats) gain from UUP and Alliance

Ballyholme and Groomsport - 6 seats
Party	Candidate	FPv%	Count									
Party	Candidate	FPv%	1	2	3	4	5	6	7	8	9	10
UUP	Leslie Cree	15.81%	864									
NI Conservatives	Bruce Mulligan*	11.18%	611	612.35	614.35	621.98	623.25	814.25				
Alliance	Jane Copeland*	13.01%	711	712.53	762.53	768.89	771.16	779.25	779.59	1,159.59		
NI Conservatives	Ivan Thompson	10.49%	573	574.53	582.53	586.89	587.16	672.43	703.71	765.07	877.07	
Ind. Unionist	Edmund Mills*	10.58%	578	580.25	584.25	589.88	593.06	602.42	602.76	630.85	684.85	713.85
DUP	Alan Leslie*	7.85%	429	432.6	434.6	452.31	686.82	693.09	693.26	697.89	703.89	705.89
UUP	Samuel Mellon	6.52%	356	375.35	378.35	518.2	532.28	547.09	547.09	575.54	608.54	635.54
Alliance	Donald Hayes*	8.86%	484	485.44	533.44	535.71	535.89	542.89	543.06			
NI Conservatives	William McLean	5.84%	319	320.44	322.53	326.25	329.34					
DUP	Robert Gordon	4.58%	250	255.22	255.31	269.21						
UUP	Ian Henry	3.04%	166	204.79	207.79							
Alliance	William Johnston	2.25%	123	123.18								
Electorate: 14,179 Valid: 5,464 (38.54%) Spoilt: 150 Quota: 781 Turnout: 5,614 (39.59%)

== 1985 Election ==
1985: 2 x UUP, 2 x Alliance, 1 x DUP, 1 x Independent Unionist

Ballyholme and Groomsport - 6 seats
Party	Candidate	FPv%	Count							
Party	Candidate	FPv%	1	2	3	4	5	6	7	8
UUP	Bruce Mulligan*	14.81%	893							
Ind. Unionist	Edmund Mills*	14.44%	871							
DUP	Alan Leslie	13.18%	795	809	1,181					
UUP	Samuel Hamilton	10.11%	610	722	728	870				
Alliance	Jane Copeland	7.71%	465	477	479	484	485.8	486.57	486.66	899.66
Alliance	Donald Hayes*	12.22%	737	758	759	770	777.52	778.71	778.89	833.89
UPUP	Valerie Kinghan	9.27%	559	583	610	710	725.2	728.98	736.63	744.63
Alliance	Sylvia Anderson	7.81%	471	480	480	483	484.8	485.22	485.22	
DUP	Elizabeth Loan	6.62%	399	417						
DUP	Enid Stringer	3.53%	213							
PUP	Samuel Meneely	0.30%	18							
Electorate: 12,532 Valid: 6,031 (48.12%) Spoilt: 93 Quota: 862 Turnout: 6,124 (48.87%)
