= Avila Kilmurray =

Community activist and peacebuilder

- Born: 1952 (age 73–74); Dublin, Republic of Ireland
- Education: University College Dublin; Australian National University (M.A.)

Avila Kilmurray (born 1952), is a community activist and peacebuilder in Northern Ireland.

== Biography ==
Avila Kilmurray was born in 1952 in Dublin. She attended University College Dublin where she graduated with a degree in History & Politics in 1973. Kilmurray got a scholarship to the Australian National University where she completed an M.A. in International Politics in 1975. During her follow on 3-year PhD scholarship in International Relations, Kilmurray was asked by Liam de Paor, her UCD History tutor, to help with the organisation of the Padraig O'Malley Amherst Conference during the 1975 ceasefires. After it Kilmurray was asked by the Quakers to take time out from her degree to support the work of Will Warren on an inter-community project. Kilmurray worked on it and it became clear she would not be returning to work on her PhD. She stayed in Derry.

Kilmurray began working in neighbourhood advice centers in the Waterside area. She worked to network centers in the Bogside, Creggan and Shantallow. She recognised the issues around poverty and women's powerlessness. Working with Cathy Harkin she set up Derry Claimants’ Union and started working to get support services for women. With Harkin, Kilmurray created Derry Women's Aid in 1977 and the first domestic violence shelter. Kilmurray worked for the Community Action Research Education project in Magee College between 1977 and 1980 before moving to Belfast to work as the ‘Scope’ magazine Assistant Editor in 1980. Kilmurray moved to work for the Northern Ireland Council for Voluntary Action as Development Officer. Kilmurray, Monica McWilliams and Cathy Harkin founded the Northern Ireland Poverty Lobby. She also started the Ulster People's College and was a member of the Northern Ireland Women's Rights Movement.

In the late 80s Kilmurray worked as Coordinator of the Rural Action Project before she was appointed a Women's Officer with the Amalgamated Transport and General Workers' Union. 1994 saw Kilmurray Start as Director of the Northern Ireland Voluntary Trust. Through 1996 they became an Intermediary Funding Agency for the EU Peace & Reconciliation Special Support Programme. Monina O'Prey and Kilmurray founded The Foundations for Peace Network. Kilmurray also joined with other women in the foundation of the Northern Ireland Women's Coalition in 1996. When she retired from the foundation in 2014 Kilmurray spent two years working with the Global Fund for Community Foundations. She then worked as an independent consultant on peacebuilding, refugee protection and migrant rights. She finally got her PhD from the Institute of Governance, Queen's University Belfast.

In 2026, she was made a member of the Royal Irish Academy.
