= Alex Easton =

Northern Irish politician (born 1969)

Alex Easton MP
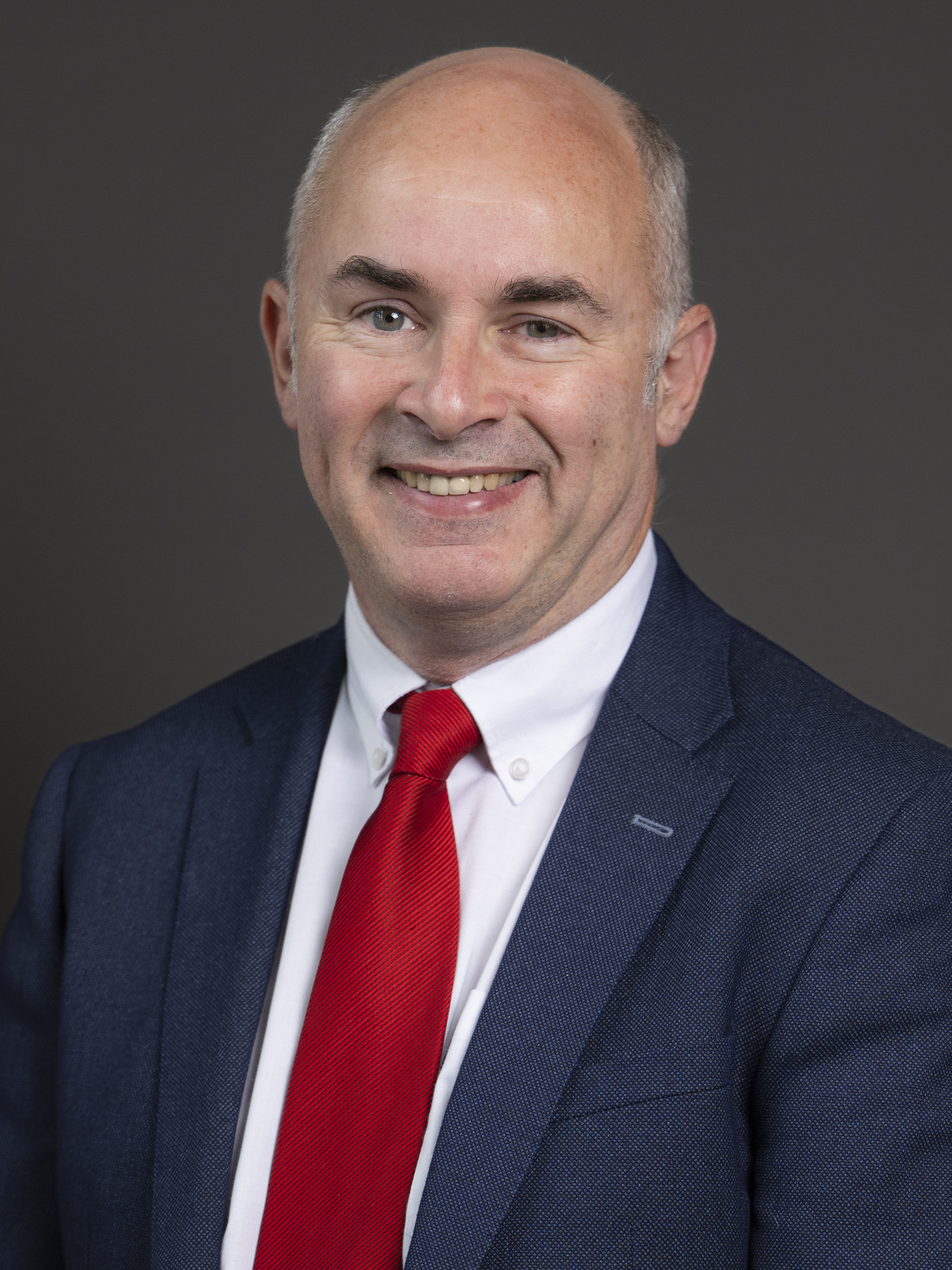
- Official portrait, 2024

Member of Parliament for North Down
- Incumbent
- Assumed office 4 July 2024
- Preceded by: Stephen Farry
- Majority: 7,305 (16.8%)

Member of the Northern Ireland Assembly for North Down
- In office 26 November 2003 – 5 July 2024
- Preceded by: Jane Morrice
- Succeeded by: Peter Martin

Member of North Down Borough Council
- In office 7 June 2001 – 22 May 2014
- Preceded by: Elizabeth Roche
- Succeeded by: Council abolished
- Constituency: Ballyholme and Groomsport

Personal details
- Born: Alexander Easton; 19 May 1969 (age 57) Bangor, Northern Ireland
- Party: Independent Unionist (2021–present)
- Other political affiliations: Democratic Unionist Party (2000–2021)
- Website: alexeastonmla.org

Alexander Easton (born 19 May 1969) is a Northern Irish politician who has served as Member of Parliament (MP) for North Down since 2024. He previously served as a Member of the Legislative Assembly (MLA) for North Down from 2003 to 2024.

Originally a member of the Democratic Unionist Party (DUP), Easton represented Ballyholme and Groomsport on the North Down Borough Council from 2001 to 2014, and became an MLA in 2003. He left the party, then led by Jeffrey Donaldson, in July 2021 following disagreements over the party's leadership and has since stood as an independent unionist.

Easton won the House of Commons seat of North Down at the 2024 United Kingdom general election as an independent, having failed to win the seat as the DUP candidate in three previous elections. He defeated the incumbent Alliance Party deputy leader Stephen Farry with a majority of 7,305 (16.8 per cent).

== Early life ==
Easton is of South African descent through his South African father. He grew up in Bangor, before moving several times and returning to Bangor when he was 10. Easton was educated at Gransha Boys High School and Bangor Technical College. He worked in the accident and emergency department in the Newtownards and then the Ulster Hospital as a clerical officer.

== Political career ==
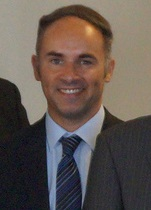
Easton in 2013

As a Democratic Unionist Party politician, he was first elected to North Down Borough Council in the 2001 local elections, and was re-elected to Council in the 2005 and 2011 elections.

He was elected to the Northern Ireland Assembly in the 2003 election, for the constituency of North Down, and returned again in 2007, 2011, 2016 and again in 2017, when he topped the poll for North Down, having increased his vote each election.

Easton stood in North Down in the 2017 General Election and polled 14,940 votes, nearly unseating the sitting MP Lady Sylvia Hermon. In the 2019 General Election, he stood once again in the constituency but was defeated by 2,968 votes.

Easton is opposed to a border poll, and has said those politically backing a backstop through Brexit could potentially lead to a border poll and is a threat to the Union, which must be opposed. Easton is also opposed to the Northern Ireland protocol.

He announced his resignation from the DUP on 1 July 2021, stating that he saw no "respect, discipline or decency" in the party's recent behaviour.

He was re-elected as an independent candidate in the 2022 Northern Ireland Assembly election, topping the poll in the constituency for the fifth consecutive time.

He was elected as an independent in North Down at the 2024 United Kingdom general election. On 24 May 2024 the DUP and TUV announced that they were supporting his candidature and would not stand a candidate in the constituency.

== Personal life ==
He is a member of the Orange Order and the Church of Ireland. He served on the North Down Policing Partnership.

In January 2023, his parents, both in their 80s, were killed in a fire at their home in Bangor, County Down.

On 6 August 2025 he climbed to the top of Mount Kilimanjaro for two charities, Bangor food bank and UHub (a mental Health charity), raising £31,000.

Northern Ireland Assembly
Preceded by Jane Morrice	Member of the Legislative Assembly for North Down; 2003–2024	Succeeded by Peter Martin
Parliament of the United Kingdom
Preceded by Stephen Farry	Member of Parliament for North Down; 2024–present	Incumbent
