= Cathy Harkin =

Civil right activist and feminist

- Born: 1942; Derry
- Died: 22 July 1985

Cathy Harkin (1942 – 22 July 1985), was the Northern Irish founding member of the single parent charity Gingerbread as well as a founder of Northern Ireland Women's Aid Federation. She was a leading activist in the Northern Ireland civil rights movement.

== Biography ==
Cathy Harkin was born in 1942 in Derry. She became a shirt factory stitcher when she left school at fourteen. She married and had two children, Terence and Molly. However Molly died a baby and Harkin was left to raise Terence as a single mother when his father became seriously unwell. Harkin was active in political movements and sold the United Irishman. She was involved with the Derry Labour Party and Derry Housing Action Committee. As a result of her activities she represented Northern Irish civil rights at events in New York. Harkin became the first female President of the Derry Trades Council.

In the 1970s Harkin was able to go back to education and completed a degree in History at the University of Ulster. Her home became a center for people to get help with a variety of subjects and in 1976 Harkin opened the first shelter for women fleeing domestic violence. They received funding later and Harkin became the first refuge worker. She went on to create the Northern Irish Women's Aid Federation. Harkin died of cancer on 22 July 1985.
