= Pearl Sagar =

Pearl Sagar OBE

Co-leader of the Northern Ireland Women's Coalition
- In office 1996–2006 Serving with Monica McWilliams

Northern Ireland Forum Member
- In office 30 May 1996 – 25 June 1998
- Preceded by: New Creation
- Succeeded by: Role Dissolved
- Constituency: Top-up list

Personal details
- Born: 1958 (age 67–68) Belfast, Northern Ireland
- Party: Northern Ireland Women's Coalition (1996 – 2006)

Pearl Sagar OBE (born 1958, Belfast, Northern Ireland) is a former Northern Irish politician.

== Background ==
Brought up a Protestant, Sagar became a social worker in East Belfast, and married a soldier in the British Army.

In 1996, she joined with Monica McWilliams in petitioning established political parties to include women among their candidates for the Northern Ireland Forum. After receiving little response, they founded the Northern Ireland Women's Coalition, to stand in the election themselves. Sagar was second on the party's list in East Belfast, but failed to be elected. However, as the party took ninth place overall in the election, it was entitled to two top-up seats, which Sagar received as the second on the Northern Ireland-wide list.

Sagar stood unsuccessfully for Belfast City Council in 1997, and she was again unsuccessful in East Belfast in the 1998 Northern Ireland Assembly election. Following her defeat, she became a consultant to the Vital Voices project.

She was made an OBE in the New Year's Honours list in January 1989.

She received an honorary doctorate from Queen's University Belfast in 2021 for her work on peace and reconciliation.

Northern Ireland Forum
New forum	Regional Member; 1996–1998	Forum dissolved
