= Leslie Cree =

Leslie Cree MBE
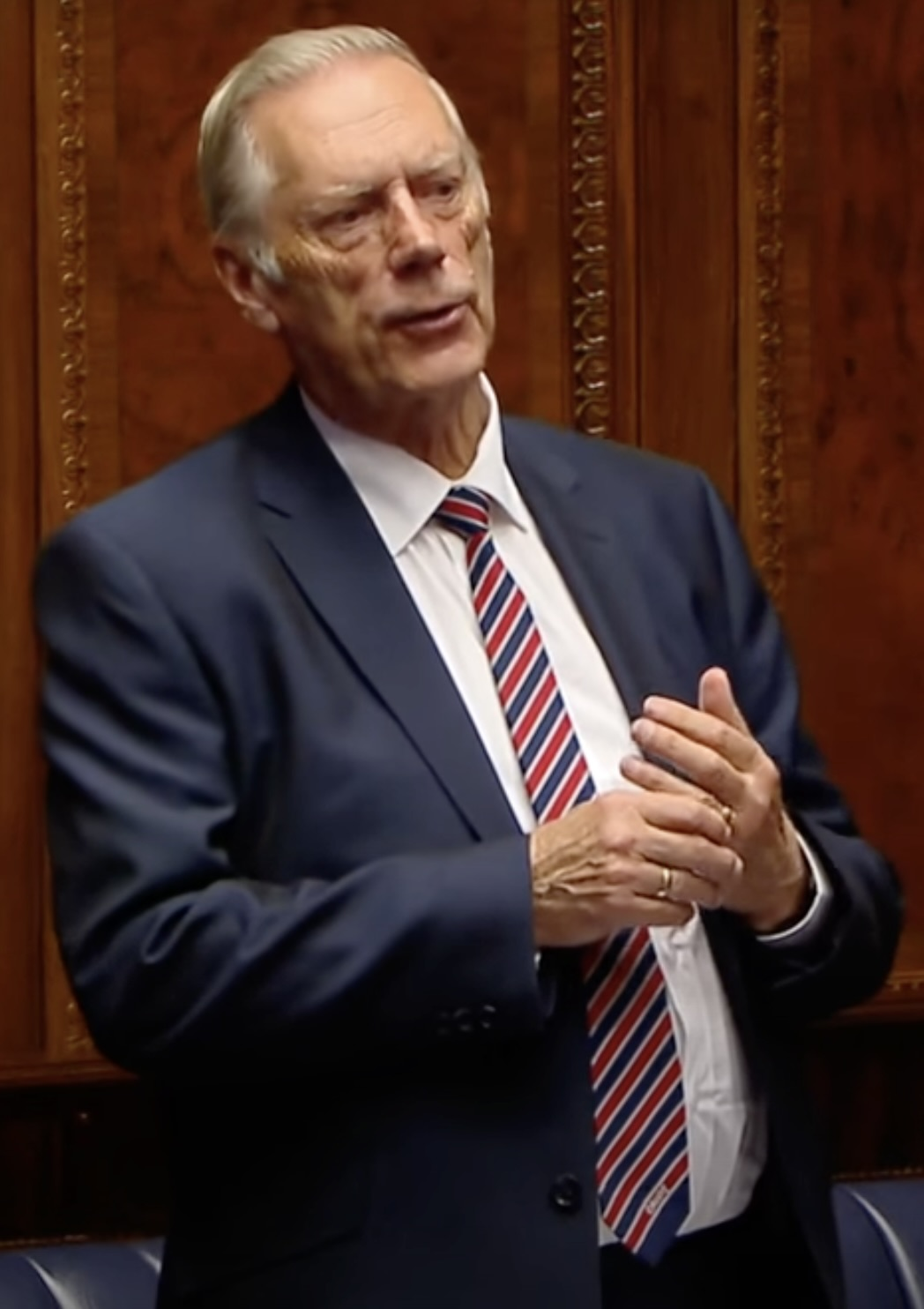
- Cree in 2015

Member of the Northern Ireland Assembly for North Down
- In office 26 November 2003 – 30 March 2016
- Preceded by: Sir John Gorman
- Succeeded by: Alan Chambers

Member of North Down Borough Council
- In office 1988 – 5 May 2011
- Preceded by: Samuel Hamilton
- Succeeded by: Peter Martin
- Constituency: Ballyholme and Groomsport

Personal details
- Born: Robin Leslie Cree; 15 July 1941 (age 85) Bangor, County Down, Northern Ireland, UK
- Party: Ulster Unionist Party
- Education: Belfast College of Commerce
- Profession: Director businessman
- Website: web.archive.org/web/20070210082350/http://www.lesliecreemla.co.uk/

Alderman Robin Leslie Cree, MBE (born 15 July 1941, Bangor, County Down) is a Unionist politician from Northern Ireland. He was an Ulster Unionist Party MLA for North Down from 2003 to 2016.

== Background ==
He was educated at Bangor Grammar School, Bangor Technical College and Belfast College of Commerce. Cree is a former Senior Executive and Director of a major International Energy Company. He has been a member of North Down Borough Council for Ballyholme and Groomsport from 1988 and is a member of all North Down Borough Council's Standing Committees.

Cree was also Mayor and Deputy Mayor (1990–1992) of North Down. Cree was Chairman of the North Down District Policing Partnership (DPP) until his appointment to the Northern Ireland Policing Board in 2007. He is Director of the Holywood and Bangor Town Centre Management Company.

== Personal life ==
- He was named MBE for community service in 2001.
- Alderman Cree is an Elder and Secretary of his local Church. He is also a member of Loyal and Masonic Orders.

Civic offices
Preceded by Denny Vitty	Mayor of North Down; 1991–1992	Succeeded by Brian Wilson
Preceded by Stephen Farry	Mayor of North Down; 2008–2009	Succeeded by Tony Hill
Northern Ireland Assembly
Preceded by Sir John Gorman	MLA for North Down; 2003–2016	Succeeded by Alan Chambers
