= Stephen Farry =

Former Northern Ireland politician (born 1971)

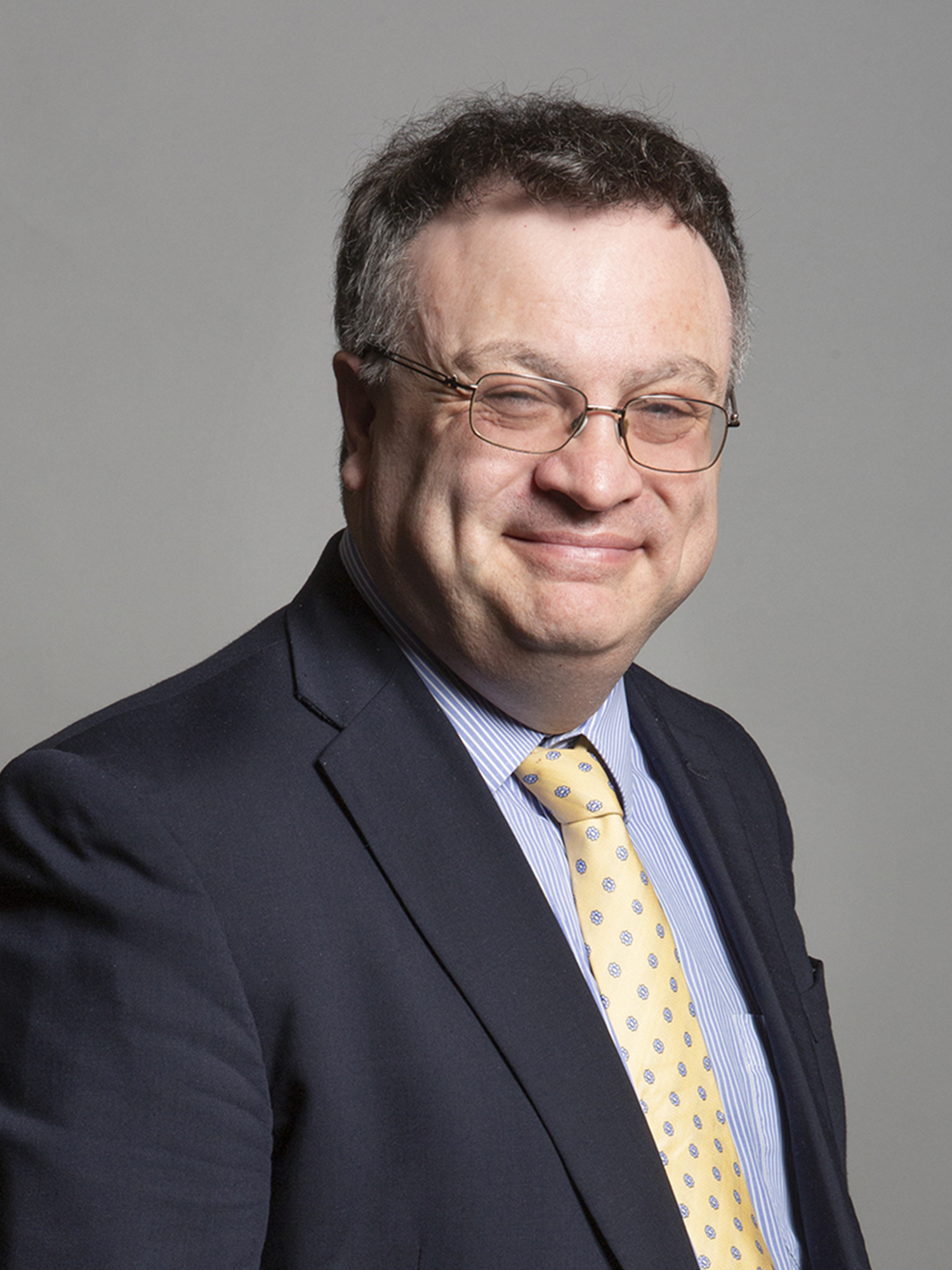

Deputy Leader of the Alliance Party
- In office 3 December 2016 – 8 October 2024
- Leader: Naomi Long
- Preceded by: Naomi Long
- Succeeded by: Eóin Tennyson

Member of Parliament for North Down
- In office 12 December 2019 – 30 May 2024
- Preceded by: Sylvia Hermon
- Succeeded by: Alex Easton

Minister for Employment and Learning
- In office 5 May 2011 – 6 May 2016
- First Minister: Peter Robinson (FM); Arlene Foster (FM); Martin McGuinness (dFM)
- Preceded by: Danny Kennedy
- Succeeded by: Office abolished

Member of the Legislative Assembly for North Down
- In office 7 March 2007 – 16 December 2019
- Preceded by: Eileen Bell
- Succeeded by: Andrew Muir

Member of North Down Borough Council
- In office 19 May 1993 – 5 May 2011
- Preceded by: James Magee
- Succeeded by: Michael Bower
- Constituency: Abbey

Personal details
- Born: Stephen Anthony Farry; 22 April 1971 (age 55) Newtownards, County Down, Northern Ireland
- Party: Alliance (until 2024)
- Spouse: Wendy Watt (m. 2005)
- Education: Queen's University Belfast

Stephen Anthony Farry (born 22 April 1971) is a Northern Irish academic and former politician who was the deputy leader of the Alliance Party of Northern Ireland from December 2016 to September 2024. Farry was the Member of Parliament (MP) for North Down from 2019, until he lost his seat to independent unionist Alex Easton at the 2024 general election.

Farry served as the member of the Legislative Assembly (MLA) for North Down from 2007 to 2019, and was Minister for Employment and Learning in the Northern Ireland Executive until the post was abolished in 2016. In 2019, he was elected to the House of Commons of the United Kingdom as MP for North Down.

== Early life and career ==
Farry is the son of Vincent Farry and Margaret Farry (née Greer). He graduated from Queen's University, Belfast in 1992 with a BSSc in Politics and a PhD in International Relations in 2000. While studying at Queen's University, Farry represented the university in an episode of University Challenge in 1994.

He was elected to the Assembly in the 2007 election for North Down, having first been elected to North Down Borough Council in 1993. In 1996, he was an unsuccessful candidate in the Northern Ireland Forum election in Fermanagh and South Tyrone. In the 2010 United Kingdom general election, he contested North Down but came in third place.

He is a former General Secretary of the Alliance Party of Northern Ireland. He was appointed an International Peace Scholar by the US Institute of Peace in 2005. In 2007, he became Mayor of North Down.

== Political career ==
=== Minister for Employment and Learning ===
Farry held his North Down seat in the 2011 Assembly election, and was subsequently appointed Minister for Employment and Learning in the 4th Northern Ireland Executive.

In September 2011, Farry announced a freeze on tuition fees in Northern Ireland, with fees only subject to an inflationary rise.

Following the decision by Alliance Party councillors to vote in favour of restricting the flying of the Union flag at Belfast City Hall to 17 specific days throughout the year in December 2012, Farry's constituency office in Bangor was the subject of an attempted arson attack.

In February 2013, he launched a review of apprenticeships and youth training, aiming to build a "gold standard" system capable of "rebalancing of the local economy and meeting the specific needs of business for a highly-skilled workforce". The 32 proposals launched by the department in June 2014 included incentives for businesses, and were welcomed by the Confederation of British Industry, the Federation of Small Businesses and NUS-USI.

Following the 2016 elections, Farry had been tipped by The Irish News to succeed David Ford as Minister of Justice. However, with the Alliance Party opting to enter opposition, he returned to the backbench. He subsequently assumed positions on the Stormont Committee for the Economy and Business Committee, remaining on these until the collapse of the Assembly in February 2017.

=== Deputy Leader of the Alliance Party ===
Following the resignation of David Ford as Alliance leader on 5 October 2016, Farry was named by The Irish Times as a potential leadership contender alongside Naomi Long. However, he did not stand as a leadership candidate and was later elected unopposed as Deputy Leader of the party.

At the 2017 Assembly election, Farry increased his share of first-preference votes in North Down to 7,014 (18.6%) and was re-elected on the first count. He served as Alliance's Brexit spokesperson and has strongly advocated for a People's Vote, argued against a no-deal Brexit and maintained that the Northern Ireland backstop must be part of any Withdrawal Agreement should the UK leave the European Union.

On 8 September 2024, Farry announced that he will step down as deputy leader of the Alliance Party, after he lost his North Down seat in the general election earlier that year. He resigned his membership of the party.

=== Member of Parliament ===
On 13 December 2019, Farry was elected to represent the constituency of North Down in the 2019 general election. Farry replaced long-term incumbent Lady Hermon, who had stepped down at the election after eighteen years as an Ulster Unionist, and later independent, MP. He made his maiden speech on 20 December 2019, starting his speech speaking in Irish to "reflect the shared traditions of Northern Ireland"; it was the first time since 1901 that a maiden speech had been conducted in Irish, when Thomas O'Donnell was chastised by the then-Speaker for not speaking in English in the chamber.

In May 2020, Farry was one of a number of politicians warned that he was under threat from loyalist paramilitaries. The threat was believed to have come from elements of the UDA in south-east Antrim.

He lost his seat in the 2024 United Kingdom general election. It was reported that he would not take the seat in the Northern Ireland Assembly vacated by Sorcha Eastwood.

== Post-parliamentary career ==
Following his defeat at the 2024 UK General Election, Farry was appointed as Professor of Strategic Policy in Practice at Ulster University. He is also the co-director of the Ulster University Strategic Policy Unit.

== Personal life ==
In 2005, Farry married Wendy Watt. He lists his recreations as travel and international affairs, along with quizzes, and reading history and biography.

Party political offices
Preceded by Richard Good	General Secretary of the Alliance Party of Northern Ireland; 2000–2007	Vacant Position abolished Title next held by Gerry Lynch
Northern Ireland Assembly
Preceded by Eileen Bell	MLA for North Down; 2007–2019	Succeeded by Andrew Muir
Civic offices
Preceded by Alan Leslie	Mayor of North Down; 2007–2008	Succeeded by Leslie Cree
Political offices
Preceded by Danny Kennedy	Minister for Employment and Learning; 2011–2016	Position abolished
Parliament of the United Kingdom
Preceded by Sylvia Hermon	Member of Parliament for North Down; 2019–2024	Succeeded by Alex Easton
