= Alan Chambers (Northern Ireland politician) =

Politician from Northern Ireland (born 1947)

Alan Chambers MLA
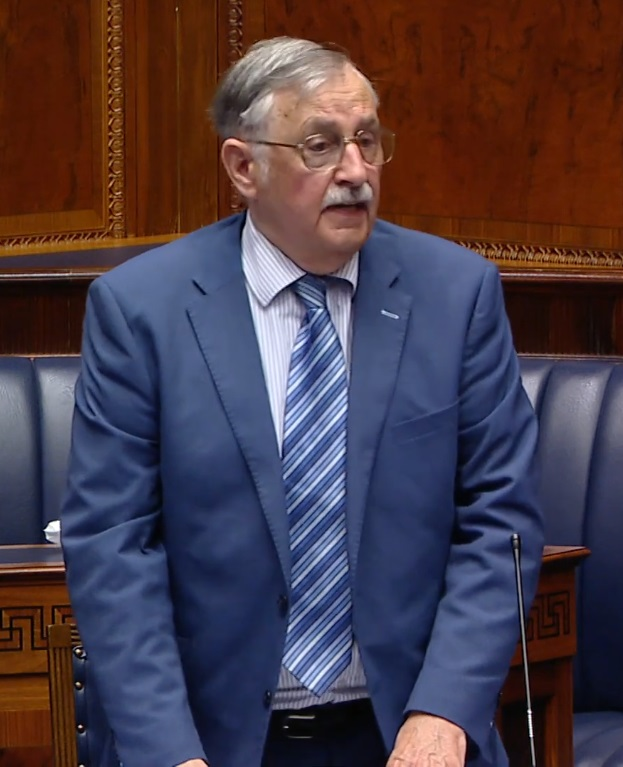
- Chambers in 2021

Chairperson of the Audits Committee
- Incumbent
- Assumed office 6 February 2024
- Deputy: Keith Buchanan

Speaker of the Northern Ireland Assembly
- Acting; 30 May 2022 – 3 February 2024
- Succeeded by: Edwin Poots

Ulster Unionist Party spokesperson for Health
- Incumbent
- Assumed office 25 May 2021
- Leader: Doug Beattie

Member of the Northern Ireland Assembly for North Down
- Incumbent
- Assumed office 5 May 2016
- Preceded by: Leslie Cree

Member of Ards and North Down Borough Council
- In office 22 May 2014 – 5 May 2016
- Preceded by: Council established
- Succeeded by: David Chambers
- Constituency: Bangor East and Donaghadee

Mayor of North Down
- In office 2000–2001
- Preceded by: Marion Smith
- Succeeded by: Ian Henry

Member of North Down Borough Council
- In office 17 April 1991 – 22 May 2014
- Preceded by: Edmund Mills
- Succeeded by: Council abolished
- Constituency: Ballyholme and Groomsport

Personal details
- Born: 15 October 1947 (age 78) Belfast, Northern Ireland
- Party: Ulster Unionist Party (2015 - present)
- Other political affiliations: Independent Unionist (1991 - 2015)
- Occupation: Politician
- Profession: Shopkeeper

Alan Chambers (born 15 October 1947) is a Northern Irish unionist politician and shopkeeper who was acting Speaker of the Northern Ireland Assembly between 2022 and 2024. Chambers has been an Ulster Unionist Party (UUP) Member of the Northern Ireland Assembly (MLA) for North Down since 2016. He currently serves as Chairperson of the Assembly's Audit Committee. Chambers operates as a shopkeeper in Groomsport alongside working as an MLA.

== Career ==
Chambers was elected to North Down Borough Council in a by-election on 17 April 1991 as an independent, representing the Ballyholme and Groomsport electoral area. He was re-elected in several elections, topping the poll in the elections of 1993, 1997 and 2001, and elected as the second candidate in 2005 and 2011. He served as Mayor of North Down for the 2000–2001 term. Following the abolition of North Down council, Chambers was elected to the successor council of North Down and Ards at the 2014 elections, topping the poll in the Bangor East and Donaghadee area.

Chambers contested the 1995 Westminster by-election in North Down, finishing fourth with 8% of the vote.

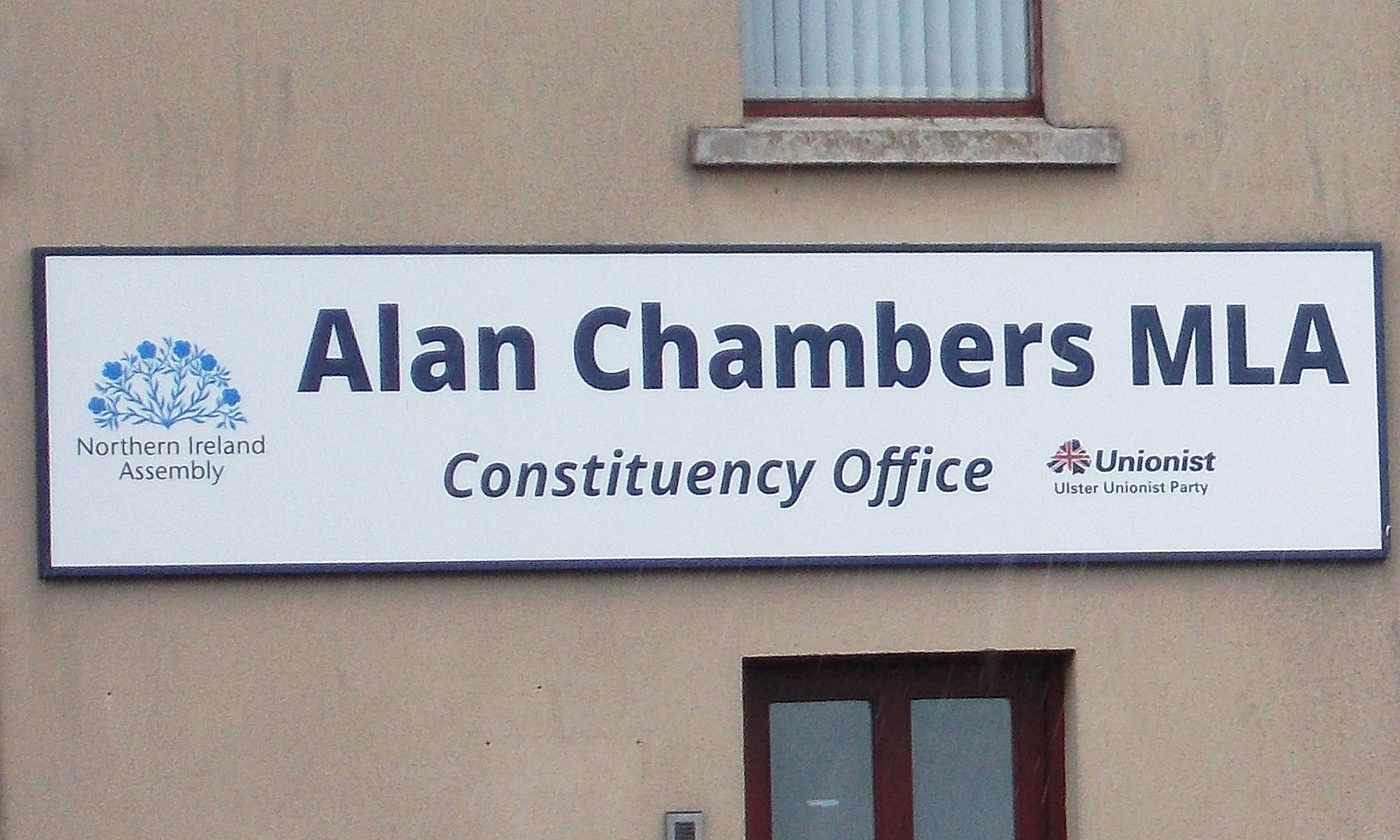
Chambers' Groomsport constituency office

At the 1996 Northern Ireland Forum elections, Chambers headed his own Independent Chambers list. However, the list was unsuccessful, polling 567 votes (0.08%) across Northern Ireland, with Chambers receiving the majority of these in North Down, representing 1% of the total vote in that constituency. He contested North Down as an independent at each subsequent Assembly election, receiving 3.7% of first preferences in 1998, 3.5% in 2003, 3.7% in 2007 and 6.3% in 2011.

In December 2015, Chambers joined the UUP and was elected to the Northern Ireland Assembly at the 2016 election.

He stood for the North Down constituency in the 2019 General Election for the UUP, finishing third with 12.1% of the vote. He currently represents the UUP on the Health Committee in the Assembly and is the party spokesperson on Health. He also served as a member of the NI Policing Board between December 2018 and June 2020.

Following the 2022 Assembly election, he served in the chair as acting Speaker of the Northern Ireland Assembly, during attempts to restore the Northern Ireland Executive, following the Democratic Unionist Party (DUP)’s decision to withdraw from the executive in February that same year.

As UUP Health spokesperson, in August 2023, Chambers called for the Northern Ireland Executive to be restored immediately to "begin investing in cancer services" and to ensure that a cancer strategy is implemented. He warned that cancer services in Northern Ireland are "spiralling into ever deeper crisis due to ongoing political impasse."

Civic offices
Preceded by Marion Smith	Mayor of North Down; 2001–2001	Succeeded by Ian Henry
Northern Ireland Assembly
Preceded by Leslie Cree	MLA for North Down; 2016 - present	Incumbent
