= Monica McWilliams =

British politician and academic (born 1954)

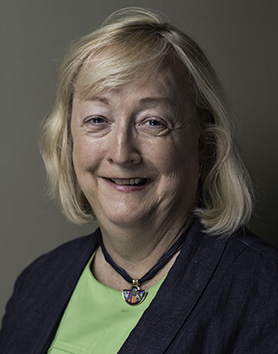

Co-leader of the Northern Ireland Women's Coalition
- In office 1996–2006 Serving with Pearl Sagar

Member of the Northern Ireland Assembly for Belfast South
- In office 25 June 1998 – 26 November 2003
- Preceded by: New Creation
- Succeeded by: Alex Maskey

Member of the Northern Ireland Forum
- In office 30 May 1996 – 25 April 1998
- Constituency: Top-up list

Personal details
- Born: 28 April 1954 (age 72) Ballymoney, Northern Ireland
- Party: Northern Ireland Women's Coalition (1996 – 2006)
- Education: Queen's University Belfast; University of Michigan
- Profession: Professor

Monica Mary McWilliams (born 28 April 1954) is a Northern Irish academic, peace activist, human rights defender and former politician.

In 1996, she co-founded the Northern Ireland Women’s Coalition (NIWC) political party and was elected as a delegate at the Multi-Party Peace Negotiations, which led to the Good Friday Peace Agreement in 1998.

She served as a Member of the Northern Ireland Assembly (MLA) for Belfast South from 1998 to 2003, and chaired the Implementation Committee on Human Rights on behalf of the British and Irish governments. She was appointed as Chief Commissioner of the Northern Ireland Human Rights Commission from 2005–2011, and was the Oversight Commissioner for prison reform in Northern Ireland (2011–2015). She currently sits on the Independent Reporting Commission for the disbandment of paramilitary organisations in Northern Ireland.

She is Emeritus Professor in the Transitional Justice Institute at Ulster University and continues her academic research into domestic violence. She also specialises in conflict resolution and working with women in conflict regions.

== Early life ==
McWilliams was born in Ballymoney, County Antrim, grew up in Kilrea, County Londonderry and was educated at Loreto College, Coleraine. She is a graduate of Queen's University Belfast and the University of Michigan, and became a Professor of Women's Studies and Social Policy at the University of Ulster.

== Career ==
McWilliams, a Catholic residing in south Belfast, co-founded (with Pearl Sagar, a Protestant social worker from East Belfast, and other women) the Northern Ireland Women's Coalition (NIWC), a political party with a feminist platform in an era where civil liberties, let alone women's rights, were difficult to gain traction on. She was inspired by Martin Luther King and watched the civil rights movement grow under his leadership in North America, noting herself that rights in Northern Ireland were of real concern too. Her focus for Northern Ireland was on a broader vision of peace based on inclusion, human rights and equality.

In 1996, McWilliams won a seat with Sagar representing the Women’s Coalition at the multi-party peace talks in Northern Ireland leading to the 1998 Good Friday Agreement. She joined the small average percentage of female signatories (5%) to international peace treaties. She faced frequent sexism and ridicule in the Forum for Dialogue and Understanding, which sat alongside the peace talks, and challenged the way in which women in public life were subjected to such behaviour. In the peace accord, she contributed to the securing of key outcomes such as restitution for victims, inclusion of reconciliation, integrated education, shared housing and a civic forum rather than a sole focus on decommissioning and disarmament. This was key to the success of the Good Friday agreement.

She was elected as one of two Northern Ireland Women’s Coalition Members of the Legislative Assembly in Northern Ireland (the other being Jane Morrice) from 1998 to 2003, representing South Belfast. During the negotiations following the Agreement, she was the Chairperson of the Human Rights Sub-Committee until 2003. In the 2003 Assembly election she lost her seat by a few hundred votes. After ten years in existence, the NIWC decided in 2006 to stand down the party.

McWilliams returned to her university post from 2003 until she was appointed by the Secretary of State for Northern Ireland as full-time Chief Commissioner of the Northern Ireland Human Rights Commission in June 2005, for a three-year term. She was reappointed for a second term, in September 2008. Under her six-year leadership, the Commission finalized the advice on a Bill of Rights for Northern Ireland. It was presented to the UK government in December 2008 where legislation on a Bill of Rights for Northern Ireland is still awaited. In 2011 she returned to the University of Ulster as Professor of Women's Studies in the Transitional Justice Institute which carries out research on gender, transition, human rights and conflict.

McWilliams was one of three persons appointed in December 2011 to a Prisons Reform Oversight Group advising the Northern Ireland Department of Justice. In 2015 she was appointed by the First Minister and the Deputy First Minister to the Fresh Start Panel on the Disbandment of Paramilitary Organizations in Northern Ireland. She was subsequently appointed by international treaty between the British and Irish governments to the Independent Reporting Commission from 2017 to 2021 to oversee the recommendations from the Panel report.

She chaired the Governing Board of Interpeace, an international NGO based in Geneva, until July 2021 and is Emeritus Professor in the Transitional Justice Institute at Ulster University. Monica helped establish Politics in Action and is on their board of directors.

McWilliams has co-authored two books and three government-published research studies: Bringing It Out in the Open: Domestic Violence in Northern Ireland (1993, with Joan McKiernan) and Taking Domestic Violence Seriously: Issues for the Civil and Criminal Justice System (1996, with Lynda Spence) and 'Intimate Partner Violence in Conflict and Post-Conflict Societies Insights and Lessons from Northern Ireland' (2017 with Jessica Doyle).

Her research in the 1990s led to the first government policy on domestic violence and was followed up twenty-five years later as the first longitudinal study on domestic violence during and post-conflict. She has published several articles on the impact of political conflict, on conflict resolution and women's rights. She has facilitated workshops with women in conflict regions including Columbia, Myanmar, Uganda, DRC, Syria, Yemen, Afghanistan, Iraq, Israel and Palestine. She was one of nine signatories of the Northern Ireland peace process jointly awarded the John F. Kennedy Library Profile in Courage Award in 1998.

On 9 June 2019, she was a 'castaway' guest on Desert Island Discs on 9 June 2019. She was featured in the documentary "Wave Goodbye to Dinosaurs", a history of the Northern Ireland's Women's Coalition.

Her book Stand up Speak Out: My Life working for women's rights, peace and equality in Northern Ireland and beyond was published in 2021.

In 2023 she was elected a member of the Royal Irish Academy.

== Awards ==
McWilliams was a joint recipient of the Frank Cousins Peace Award in 1999 (commemorating a British trade union official). She has received honorary doctorates from Lesley College (Massachusetts), Mount Mary College (Milwaukee), University of York, Queen's University Belfast, Dublin City University and Trinity College Dublin.

In 2018, in recognition of her life work and in celebration of the 100 Anniversary of Suffrage, Women in Business awarded Monica with a Special Lifetime Achievement Award. Also in 2018 Monica McWilliams was inducted into The Irish Tatler Hall of Fame.

In November 2023, McWilliams was named to the BBC's 100 Women list.

== See also ==
- List of peace activists

Northern Ireland Forum
New forum	Regional Member; 1996–1998	Forum dissolved
Northern Ireland Assembly
New assembly	MLA for Belfast South; 1998–2003	Succeeded by Alex Maskey
