= Elections in Northern Ireland =

Elections in Northern Ireland are held on a regular basis to local councils, the Northern Ireland Assembly and to the Parliament of the United Kingdom.

The Northern Ireland Assembly has 90 members, elected in 18 five-member constituencies by the single transferable vote (STV) method. Northern Ireland is represented at Westminster by 18 single-member constituencies elected by the first-past-the-post method.

Unlike in the rest of the United Kingdom, elections in Northern Ireland are administered centrally by the Chief Electoral Officer for Northern Ireland and the Electoral Office for Northern Ireland rather than by local authorities.

== Elections to the United Kingdom House of Commons ==
Legend
U: unionist; N: nationalist; O: other.

View source data. Results over time(Northern Irish seats for parliament)
Election	SF (N)	DUP (U)	UUP (U)	SDLP (N)	APNI (O)	TUV (U)	UKUP (U)	UPUP (U)	UUUP (U)	VUPP (U)	RLP (N)	PUP (U)	Unity (N)	NP (N)	Lab (O)	Ind U	Ind N	Ind Lab	Total	Total U	Total N	Total O
1922			11											2					13	11	2	
1923			11											2					13	11	2	
1924			13																13	13		
1929			11											2					13	11	2	
1931			11											2					13	11	2	
1935			11											2					13	11	2	
1945			9											2		1		1	13	10	2	1
1950			10											2					12	10	2	
1951			9											2	1				12	9	2	1
1955	2		10																12	10	2	
1959			12																12	12		
1964			12																12	12		
1966			11								1								12	11	1	
1970			8								1	1	2						12	9	3	
Feb. 1974		1	7	1						3									12	11	1	
Oct. 1974		1	6	1						3							1		12	10	2	
1979		3	5	1					1							1	1		12	10	2	
1983	1	3	11	1				1											17	15	2	
1987	1	3	9	3				1											17	13	4	
1992		3	9	4				1											17	13	4	
1997	2	2	10	3			1												18	13	5	
2001	4	5	6	3															18	11	7	
2005	5	9	1	3															18	10	8	
2010	5	8		3	1											1			18	9	8	1
2015	4	8	2	3												1			18	11	7	
2017	7	10														1			18	11	7	
2019	7	8		2	1														18	8	9	1
2024	7	5	1	2	1	1										1			18	8	9	1

- Sinn Féin have never taken their seats in the United Kingdom House of Commons due to their policy of abstentionism.
- UUP MPs sat as members of the Conservative Party until 1972.

=== By-elections ===
Gains are marked with a grey background.

Constituency	Date	Incumbent	Party	Winner	Party	Cause
Mid Armagh	23 June 1921	James Lonsdale	UUP	Henry Armstrong	UUP	Death
Belfast Duncairn	23 June 1921	Edward Carson	UUP	Thomas McConnell	UUP	Appointed Lord of Appeal in Ordinary
North Down	23 June 1921	Thomas Watters Brown	UUP	Thomas Watters Brown	UUP	Appointed Solicitor-General for Ireland
Mid Down	2 July 1921	James Craig	UUP	Robert Sharman-Crawford	UUP	Elected Prime Minister of Northern Ireland
West Down	5 July 1921	Daniel Martin Wilson	UUP	Thomas Browne Wallace	UUP	Appointed Recorder of Belfast
South Londonderry	29 August 1921	Denis Henry	UUP	Robert Chichester	UUP	Appointed Lord Chief Justice of Northern Ireland
South Londonderry	18 January 1922	Robert Chichester	UUP	William Pain	UUP	Death
West Down	17 February 1922	Thomas Browne Wallace	UUP	Hugh Hayes	UUP	Appointed Chief Clerk to the High Court of Northern Ireland
North Down	21 February 1922	Thomas Watters Brown	UUP	Sir Henry Wilson, Bt	UUP	Appointed to the High Court of Northern Ireland
North Londonderry	4 June 1922	Hugh T. Barrie	UUP	Malcolm Macnaghten	UUP	Death
North Down	21 July 1922	Sir Henry Wilson, Bt	UUP	John Simms	UUP	Killed by the IRA
Londonderry	29 January 1929	Malcolm Macnaghten	UUP	Ronald Ross	UUP	Appointment to High Court of Justice of England and Wales
Fermanagh and Tyrone	7 March 1931	Thomas Harbison	Nationalist	Cahir Healy	Nationalist	Death
Fermanagh and Tyrone	27 June 1934	Joseph Devlin	Nationalist	Joe Stewart	Nationalist	Death
Down	10 May 1939	David Reid	UUP	James Little	UUP	Death
Belfast East	8 February 1940	Herbert Dixon	UUP	Henry Harland	UUP	Elevation to the Peerage
Queen's University of Belfast	2 November 1940	Thomas Sinclair	UUP	Douglas Savory	UUP	Resignation
Belfast West	9 February 1943	Alexander Browne	UUP	Jack Beattie	NI Labour	Death
Antrim	11 February 1943	Sir Joseph McConnell, Bt	UUP	John Dermot Campbell	UUP	Death
Down	2 June 1946	James Little	Ind. Unionist	C. H. Mullan	UUP	Death
Armagh	5 March 1948	Sir William Allen	UUP	Richard Harden	UUP	Death by road accident
Belfast West	29 November 1950	J. G. MacManaway	UUP	Thomas Teevan	UUP	Disqualified under the House of Commons (Clergy Disqualification) Act 1801
Londonderry	19 May 1951	Ronald Ross	UUP	William Wellwood	UUP	Appointment as Northern Ireland Government Agent in London
North Antrim	27 October 1952	Sir Hugh O'Neill	UUP	Phelim O'Neill	UUP	Resignation
Belfast South	4 November 1952	Conolly Gage	UUP	David Campbell	UUP	Resignation
North Down	15 April 1953	Walter Smiles	UUP	Patricia Ford	UUP	Died in MV Princess Victoria ferry disaster
Armagh	20 November 1954	Richard Harden	UUP	C. W. Armstrong	UUP	Resignation
Mid Ulster	11 August 1955	Tom Mitchell	Sinn Féin	Tom Mitchell	Sinn Féin	Disqualification
Mid Ulster	8 May 1956	Charles Beattie	UUP	George Forrest	Ind. Unionist	Disqualification
Belfast East	19 March 1959	Alan McKibbin	UUP	Stanley McMaster	UUP	Death
Belfast South	22 October 1963	Sir David Campbell	UUP	Rafton Pounder	UUP	Death
Mid Ulster	17 April 1969	George Forrest	UUP	Bernadette Devlin	Unity	Death
Fermanagh and South Tyrone	9 April 1981	Frank Maguire	Ind. Nationalist	Bobby Sands	Anti H-Block	Death
Fermanagh and South Tyrone	20 August 1981	Bobby Sands	Anti H-Block	Owen Carron	Anti H-Block	Death from hunger strike
Belfast South	4 March 1982	Robert Bradford	UUP	Martin Smyth	UUP	Killed by the IRA
Antrim North	23 January 1986	Ian Paisley	DUP	Ian Paisley	DUP	Resignation in protest at Anglo-Irish Agreement
Antrim East	23 January 1986	Roy Beggs	UUP	Roy Beggs	UUP	Resignation in protest at Anglo-Irish Agreement
Antrim South	23 January 1986	Clifford Forsythe	UUP	Clifford Forsythe	UUP	Resignation in protest at Anglo-Irish Agreement
Belfast East	23 January 1986	Peter Robinson	DUP	Peter Robinson	DUP	Resignation in protest at Anglo-Irish Agreement
Belfast North	23 January 1986	Cecil Walker	UUP	Cecil Walker	UUP	Resignation in protest at Anglo-Irish Agreement
Belfast South	23 January 1986	Martin Smyth	UUP	Martin Smyth	UUP	Resignation in protest at Anglo-Irish Agreement
Down North	23 January 1986	James Kilfedder	UPUP	James Kilfedder	UPUP	Resignation in protest at Anglo-Irish Agreement
Down South	23 January 1986	Enoch Powell	UUP	Enoch Powell	UUP	Resignation in protest at Anglo-Irish Agreement
Fermanagh and South Tyrone	23 January 1986	Ken Maginnis	UUP	Ken Maginnis	UUP	Resignation in protest at Anglo-Irish Agreement
Lagan Valley	23 January 1986	James Molyneaux	UUP	James Molyneaux	UUP	Resignation in protest at Anglo-Irish Agreement
East Londonderry	23 January 1986	William Ross	UUP	William Ross	UUP	Resignation in protest at Anglo-Irish Agreement
Mid Ulster	23 January 1986	William McCrea	DUP	William McCrea	DUP	Resignation in protest at Anglo-Irish Agreement
Strangford	23 January 1986	John Taylor	UUP	John Taylor	UUP	Resignation in protest at Anglo-Irish Agreement
Newry and Armagh	23 January 1986	James Nicholson	UUP	Seamus Mallon	SDLP	Resignation in protest at Anglo-Irish Agreement
Upper Bann	23 January 1986	Harold McCusker	UUP	Harold McCusker	UUP	Resignation in protest at Anglo-Irish Agreement
Upper Bann	17 May 1990	Harold McCusker	UUP	David Trimble	UUP	Death
North Down	15 June 1995	Sir James Kilfedder	UPUP	Robert McCartney	UK Unionist	Death
South Antrim	21 September 2000	Clifford Forsythe	UUP	William McCrea	DUP	Death
Belfast West	9 June 2011	Gerry Adams	Sinn Féin	Paul Maskey	Sinn Féin	Resignation to contest the Louth constituency in the Irish general election
Mid Ulster	7 March 2013	Martin McGuinness	Sinn Féin	Francie Molloy	Sinn Féin	Resignation to end dual mandate as Member of Parliament and Member of the Northern Ireland Assembly
West Tyrone	3 May 2018	Barry McElduff	Sinn Féin	Órfhlaith Begley	Sinn Féin	Resignation

=== Recall petition ===
- 2018 North Antrim recall petition

== Referendums ==
=== Northern Ireland-specific referendums ===
- 1973 Northern Ireland border poll
- 1998 Northern Ireland Good Friday Agreement referendum

=== United Kingdom-wide referendums ===
- 1975 United Kingdom European Communities membership referendum#Results by United Kingdom constituent countries
- 2011 United Kingdom Alternative Vote referendum#Results by constituent countries
- 2016 United Kingdom European Union membership referendum#Results by constituent countries & Gibraltar

== Elections to the Northern Ireland Assembly ==
Legend
U: unionist; N: nationalist; O: other.

Election	DUP (U)	SF (N)	UUP (U)	SDLP (N)	APNI (O)	UKUP (U)	UPUP (U)	PUP (U)	VUPP (U)	UPNI (U)	NILP (O)	NIWC (O)	GPNI (O)	TUV (U)	PBP (O)	Ind U	Ind N	Ind O	Total	Total U	Total N	Total O
1973	8		31	19	8				7		1					4			78	50	19	9
1975	12		19	17	8				14	5	1					2			78	52	17	9
1982	21	5	26	14	10		1									1			78	49	19	10
1998	20	18	28	24	6	5		2				2				3			108	58	42	8
2003	30	24	27	18	6	1		1										1	108	59	42	7
2007	36	28	18	16	7			1					1					1	108	55	44	9
2011	38	29	16	14	8								1	1		1			108	56	43	9
2016	38	28	16	12	8								2	1	2	1			108	56	40	12
2017	28	27	10	12	8								2	1	1	1			90	40	39	11
2022	25	27	9	8	17									1	1	2			90	37	35	18

- 1998 Northern Ireland Assembly election
- 2003 Northern Ireland Assembly election
- 2007 Northern Ireland Assembly election
- 2011 Northern Ireland Assembly election
- 2016 Northern Ireland Assembly election
- 2017 Northern Ireland Assembly election
- 2022 Northern Ireland Assembly election

== Elections to the European Parliament ==
From 1979 to 2020, three of the seats in the European Parliament allocated to the United Kingdom formed a three-seat constituency elected by single transferable vote. It differed from European Parliament constituencies elsewhere in the United Kingdom which used the D'Hondt method. The United Kingdom withdrew from the European Union on 31 January 2020, and the constituency was abolished.

Year					
Year	DUP	SF	APNI	UUP	SDLP
1979	1	0	0	1	1
1984	1	0	0	1	1
1989	1	0	0	1	1
1994	1	0	0	1	1
1999	1	0	0	1	1
2004	1	1	0	1	0
2009	1	1	0	1	0
2014	1	1	0	1	0
2019	1	1	1	0	0

== Ad hoc elections ==
- 1973 Northern Ireland Assembly election
- 1975 Northern Ireland Constitutional Convention election
- 1982 Northern Ireland Assembly election
- 1996 Northern Ireland Forum election

== Elections to the Northern Ireland House of Commons ==
- 1921 Northern Ireland general election
- 1925 Northern Ireland general election
- 1929 Northern Ireland general election
- 1933 Northern Ireland general election
- 1938 Northern Ireland general election
- 1945 Northern Ireland general election
- 1949 Northern Ireland general election
- 1953 Northern Ireland general election
- 1958 Northern Ireland general election
- 1962 Northern Ireland general election
- 1965 Northern Ireland general election
- 1969 Northern Ireland general election

=== By-elections ===
- List of Northern Ireland Parliament by-elections
