= 1983 United Kingdom general election in Northern Ireland =

- 9 June 1983

All 17 Northern Ireland seats in the House of Commons
- Turnout: 72.9% (▲5.2 pp)
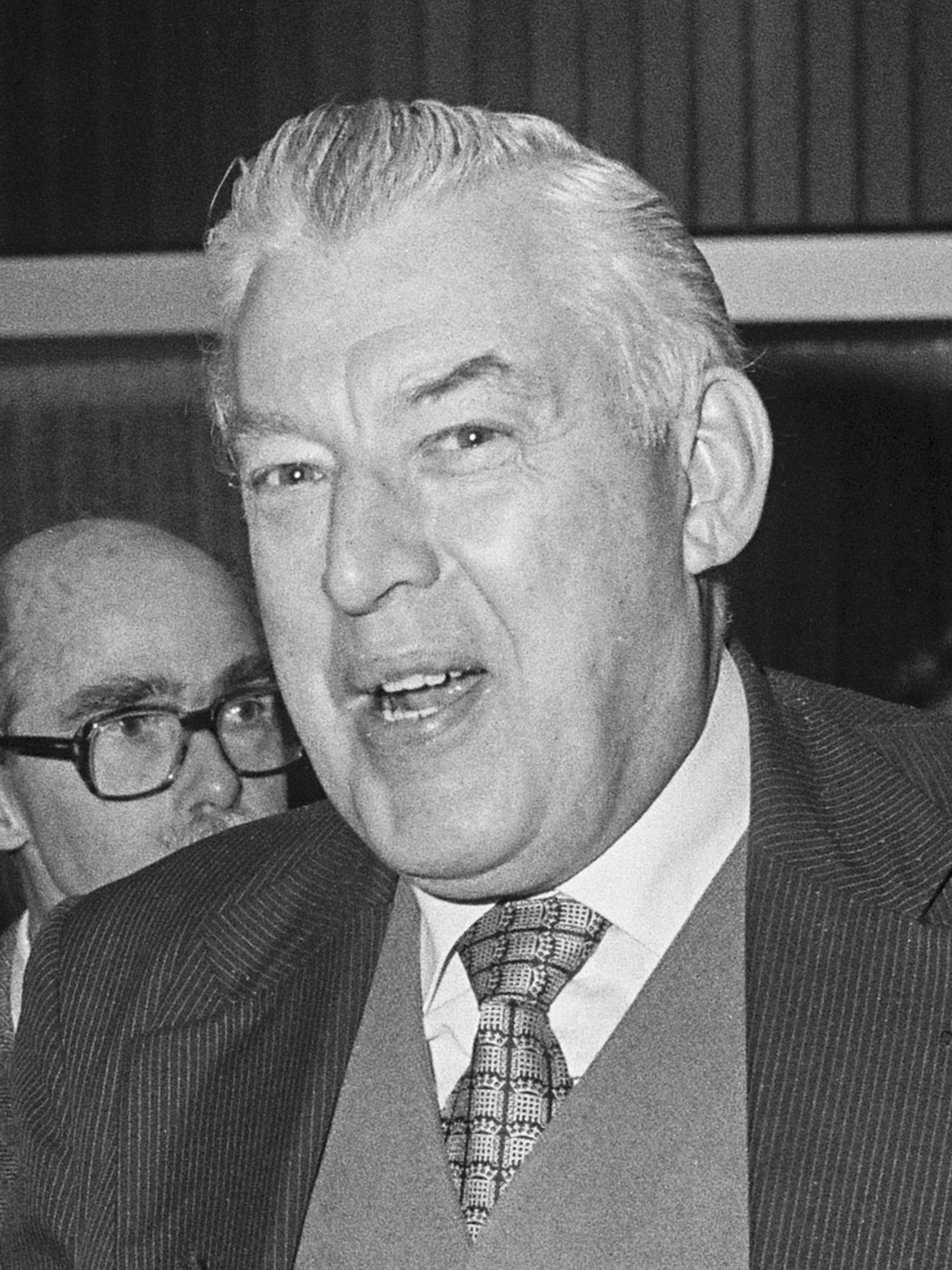

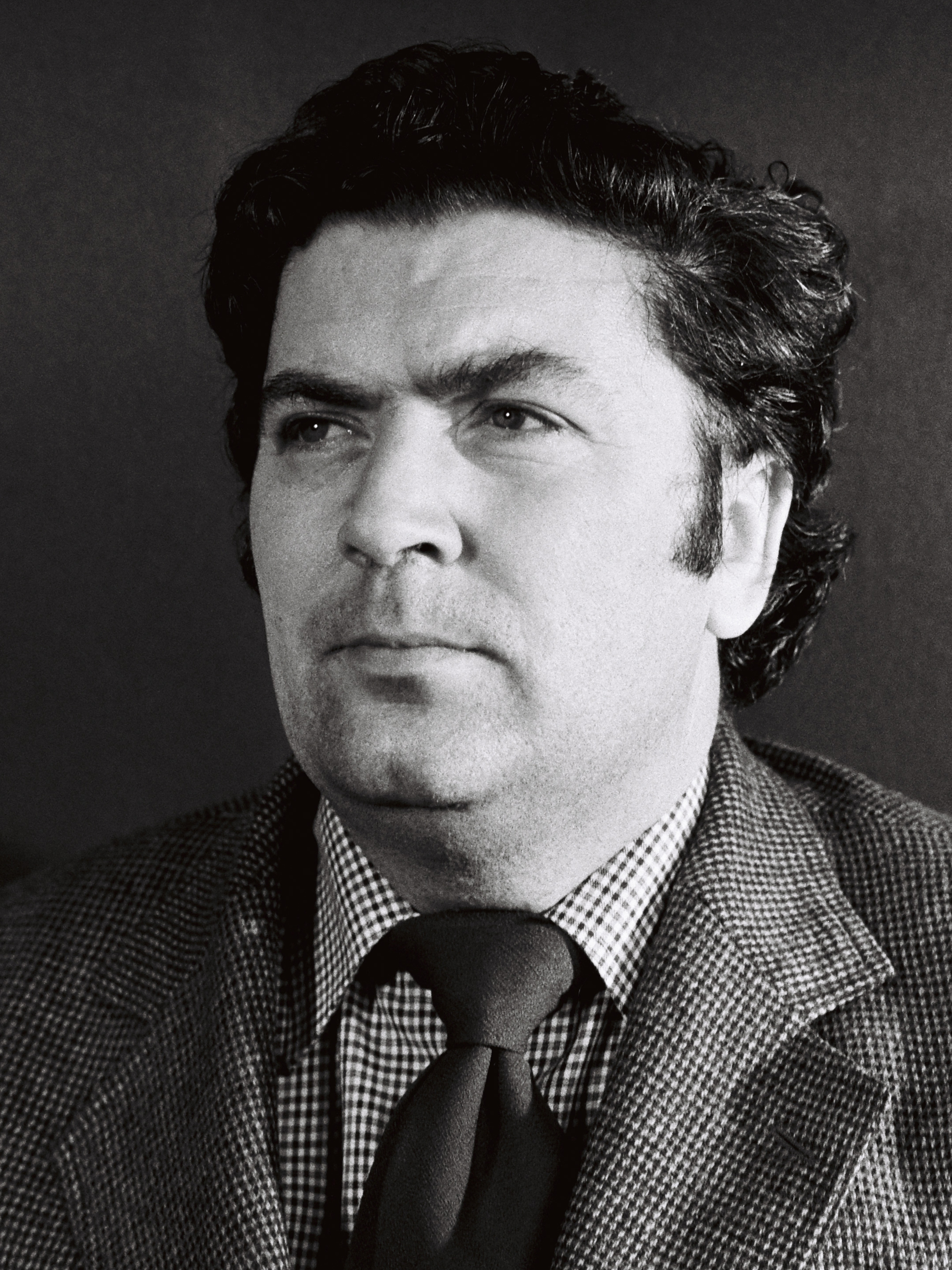

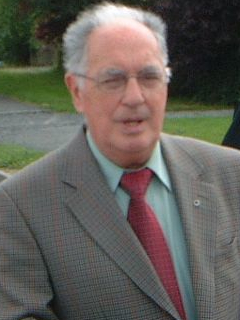
	First party	Second party	Third party
	UUP
Leader	James Molyneaux	Ian Paisley	John Hume
Party	UUP	DUP	SDLP
Leader since	1979	1971	6 May 1979
Leader's seat	Lagan Valley	Antrim North	Foyle
Last election	5 seats, 36.6%	3 seats, 10.2%	1 seat, 18.2%
Seats before	9†	2†	2†
Seats won	11	3	1
Seat change	▲2*	▲1*	▼1*
Popular vote	259,952	152,749	137,012
Percentage	34.0%	20.0%	17.9%
Swing	▼2.6 pp	▲9.8 pp	▼0.3 pp
	Fourth party	Fifth party
		UPUP
Leader	Ruairí Ó Brádaigh	James Kilfedder
Party	Sinn Féin	UPUP
Leader since	1970	1980
Leader's seat	Did not stand	North Down
Last election	Did not contest	Did not contest
Seats before	0†	0†
Seats won	1	1
Seat change	▲1*	▲1* (Note: James Kilfedder was previously an Independent Unionist MP in the previous seat of the same name.)
Popular vote	102,701	22,681
Percentage	13.4%	3.0%
Swing	▲13.4 pp	New party
- ^{†}Notional 1979 results if held on the 1983 boundaries *Indicates boundary change—so this is a notional figure.

On 9 June 1983, the 1983 United Kingdom general election was held in Northern Ireland, to elect all 650 members of the House of Commons, including the 17 Northern Ireland seats. This was an increase of five seats, after the House of Commons (Redistribution of Seats) Act 1979 had come into effect to account for the reduced representation after direct rule had been imposed since 1972. New constituencies were drawn up in 1982.

The Conservative Party led by Margaret Thatcher as prime minister won another term in government.

The main beneficiaries of the increase of seats was the Ulster Unionist Party, now led by James Molyneaux. The SDLP lost a seat held by former leader Gerry Fitt to Gerry Adams of Sinn Féin, but the new SDLP leader John Hume gained a seat.

== Electoral system ==
Following boundary changes in 1983, the number of seats in Northern Ireland was increased from 12 to 17. Within the new boundaries, the production of notional seats were assessed by the BBC/ITV of how the 1979 results would have turned out on the new borders, with later productions by Electoral Calculus showed that the seats would have been as follows: 9 Ulster Unionist Party seats; 3 Democratic Unionist Party seats; 2 Social Democratic and Labour Party seats; 2 Independent Unionist seats; 1 United Ulster Unionist Party seat; and 1 Independent Republican seat.

== Candidates ==
Below is a table summarising the candidates of the 1983 general election in Northern Ireland.

Affiliation	Candidates
Social Democratic and Labour Party	17
Ulster Unionist Party	16
Democratic Unionist Party	14
Sinn Féin	14
Workers' Party	14
Alliance Party of Northern Ireland	12
Ulster Popular Unionist Party	1 (Note: Candidate and leader James Kilfedder in North Down.)
Independent Democratic Unionist	1 (Note: Candidate William Campbell Gault stood in Belfast North.)
Ecology Party	1
Independent Socialist	1 (Note: Candidate Gerry Fitt stood in Belfast West.)
Labour and Trade Union Group	1 (Note: Candidate Muriel Tang stood in Belfast East.)
Independent	1 (Note: Candidate William Anthony Cunning stood in East Antrim.)
New Agenda	1 (Note: Candidate Herbert Boyd stood in Belfast East.)
Independent Labour	1 (Note: Candidate Samuel Raymond Heath stood in Strangford.)
Total	95

== Analysis ==
The Ulster Unionist Party under leader James Molyneaux remained the largest party in Northern Ireland. The party held East Antrim, South Antrim, Belfast South, South Down, Lagan Valley, East Londonderry and Newry and Armagh and Upper Bann. It also 'held' Belfast North, which it held notionally under the new boundaries despite being a DUP seat in the previous election. Its further gain in Strangford was technically a gain from an Independent Unionist, due the seat being within the old boundaries of North Down. It also gained Fermanagh and South Tyrone, with candidate Ken Maginnis entering Parliament, taking the seat technically from being an Independent Republican-held seat, although facing primary opposition of Sinn Féin. Therefore, the UUP gained 2 seats while holding 9 seats notionally at this election.

The Democratic Unionist Party on the notional boundaries held 2 seats, despite winning 3 at the last election (being Belfast North under the old boundaries). Under the new boundaries, it held North Antrim and Belfast East. It also gained Mid Ulster from the defunct United Ulster Unionist Party, therefore increasing by 1 seat at this election.

Amongst the unionists, James Kilfedder retained a seat in parliament in North Down, but it was technically a gain from his previous position as an Independent Unionist in his old seat of the same name.

The Social Democratic and Labour Party took the seat of Foyle, which was technically a hold on the notional results in the new boundaries by John Hume. However, it lost Belfast West to Sinn Féin, which it had won in the previous election. In the seat, future leader of Sinn Féin, Gerry Adams, won a seat at Westminster. It was the first time since 1955 that the party had won a seat at a general election.

== Results ==
Party	Seats					Aggregate votes		
Party	Total	Gains	Losses	Net	Of total (%)	Total	Of total (%)	Change (%)
UUP	11	2	0	▲2	64.7	259,952	34.0	▼2.6
DUP	3	1	0	▲1	17.6	152,749	20.0	▲9.8
SDLP	1	0	1	▼1	5.9	137,012	17.9	▼0.3
Sinn Féin	1	Did not stand in 1979		▲1	5.9	102,701	13.4	—N/a
Alliance	0	0	0	Steady	—	61,275	8.0	▼3.9
UPUP	1	New		▲1	5.9	22,681	3.0	New
Workers' Party	0	0	0	Steady	—	14,650	1.9	▲0.2
Independent Socialist	0	New			—	10,326	1.3	New
Independent DUP	0	New			—	1,134	0.1	New
Independent	0	0	0	Steady	—	741	0.1	▼0.1
Labour and Trade Union	0	New			—	584	0.1	New
Ecology	0	New			—	451	0.1	New
Independent Labour	0	0	0	Steady	—	430	0.0	▼0.1
New Agenda	0	New			—	59	0.0	New
Other non-contested	0	—N/a		▼4 (Note: 2 Independent Unionist seats; 1 Independent Republican seat; and 1 United Ulster Unionist Party seat.)	—	0	0.0	—N/a
Blank and invalid votes						4,353	—	—
Total	17			0	100.0	764,925 (Note: All valid votes excluding spoiled votes.)	100.0	0.0
Registered voters, and turnout						1,048,766	72.9	▲5.2

Popular vote
UUP	34.0%
DUP	20.0%
SDLP	17.9%
Sinn Féin	13.4%
APNI	8.0%
UPUP	3.0%
Workers	1.9%
Ecology	0.1%
Other	1.7%

Parliamentary seats
UUP	64.7%
DUP	17.6%
SDLP	5.9%
Sinn Féin	5.9%
UPUP	5.9%

== MPs elected ==
Constituency	Party	MP
Antrim East	UUP	Roy Beggs
Antrim North	DUP	Ian Paisley
Antrim South	UUP	Clifford Forsythe
Belfast East	DUP	Peter Robinson
Belfast North	UUP	Cecil Walker
Belfast South	UUP	Martin Smyth
Belfast West	Sinn Féin	Gerry Adams
Down North	UPUP	Jim Kilfedder
Down South	UUP	Enoch Powell
Fermanagh and South Tyrone	UUP	Ken Maginnis
Foyle	SDLP	John Hume
Lagan Valley	UUP	James Molyneaux
Londonderry East	UUP	William Ross
Mid Ulster	DUP	William McCrea
Newry and Armagh	UUP	Jim Nicholson
Strangford	UUP	John Taylor
Upper Bann	UUP	Harold McCusker

=== By-elections ===
In December 1985, all Unionist MPs resigned their seats in opposition to the Anglo-Irish Agreement and sought re-election in by-elections. These resulted in a loss of one seat to the SDLP

Constituency	Date	Incumbent	Party	Winner	Party	Cause
Antrim North	23 January 1986	Ian Paisley	DUP	Ian Paisley	DUP	Resignation
Antrim East	23 January 1986	Roy Beggs	UUP	Roy Beggs	UUP	Resignation
Antrim South	23 January 1986	Clifford Forsythe	UUP	Clifford Forsythe	UUP	Resignation
Belfast East	23 January 1986	Peter Robinson	DUP	Peter Robinson	DUP	Resignation
Belfast North	23 January 1986	Cecil Walker	UUP	Cecil Walker	UUP	Resignation
Belfast South	23 January 1986	Martin Smyth	UUP	Martin Smyth	UUP	Resignation
Down North	23 January 1986	James Kilfedder	UPUP	James Kilfedder	UPUP	Resignation
Down South	23 January 1986	Enoch Powell	UUP	Enoch Powell	UUP	Resignation
Fermanagh and South Tyrone	23 January 1986	Ken Maginnis	UUP	Ken Maginnis	UUP	Resignation
Lagan Valley	23 January 1986	James Molyneaux	UUP	James Molyneaux	UUP	Resignation
East Londonderry	23 January 1986	William Ross	UUP	William Ross	UUP	Resignation
Mid Ulster	23 January 1986	William McCrea	DUP	William McCrea	DUP	Resignation
Strangford	23 January 1986	John Taylor	UUP	John Taylor	UUP	Resignation
Newry and Armagh	23 January 1986	James Nicholson	UUP	Seamus Mallon	SDLP	Resignation
Upper Bann	23 January 1986	Harold McCusker	UUP	Harold McCusker	UUP	Resignation

== See also ==
- 1983 United Kingdom general election in England
- 1983 United Kingdom general election in Scotland
- 1983 United Kingdom general election in Wales
