= Democratic Unionist Party general election results =

This article lists the Democratic Unionist Party's election results in UK parliamentary elections.

== Summary of general election performance ==
Year	Number of Candidates	Total votes	Average votes per candidate	% UK vote	% NI vote	Change (percentage points)	Saved deposits	Number of MPs (out of NI total)
1974 Feb	2	58,656	29,328	0.2	8.2	N/A	2	1 / 12
1974 Oct	2	59,451	29,766	0.3	8.5	+0.1	2	1 / 12
1979	5	70,795	14,159	0.5	10.2	+0.2	3	3 / 12
1983	14	152,749	10,911	0.5	20.0	0.0	10	3 / 17
1987	4	85,642	21,411	0.3	11.7	−0.2	4	3 / 17
1992	7	103,039	14,720	0.3	13.1	0.0	7	3 / 17
1997	9	107,348	11,928	0.3	13.6	0.0	9	2 / 18
2001	14	181,999	13,000	0.7	22.5	+0.4	14	5 / 18
2005	18	241,856	17,275	0.9	33.7	+0.2	18	9 / 18
2010	16	168,216	10,514	0.6	25.0	−0.3	16	8 / 18
2015	16	184,260	11,516	0.6	25.7	0.0	16	8 / 18
2017	17	292,316	17,195	0.9	36.0	+0.3	17	10 / 18
2019	17	244,128	14,360	0.8	30.6	-0.1	17	8 / 18

== Election results ==
=== 1970 general election ===
The 1970 general election was contested by the DUP's forerunner, the Protestant Unionist Party.

Constituency	Candidate	Votes	%	Position
Belfast North	William Beattie	11,173	18.8	3
North Antrim	Ian Paisley	24,130	41.2	1

=== February 1974 general election ===
Constituency	Candidate	Votes	%	Position
Belfast West	John McQuade	17,374	36.5	2
North Antrim	Ian Paisley	41,282	63.5	1

=== October 1974 general election ===
Constituency	Candidate	Votes	%	Position
Belfast West	John McQuade	16,265	36.5	2
North Antrim	Ian Paisley	43,186	72.6	1

=== 1979 general election ===
Constituency	Candidate	Votes	%	Position
Belfast East	Peter Robinson	15,994	31.4	1
Belfast North	John McQuade	11,690	27.6	1
Belfast West	Billy Dickson	3,716	11.2	3
Londonderry	Davy Calvert	5,634	8.6	3
North Antrim	Ian Paisley	33,941	51.7	1

=== By-elections, 1979–83 ===
Election	Candidate	Votes	%	Position
1982 Belfast South by-election	William McCrea	9,818	22.6	3

=== 1983 general election ===
Constituency	Candidate	Votes	%	Position
Belfast East	Peter Robinson	17,631	45.3	1
Belfast North	George Seawright	8,260	19.5	2
Belfast South	Raymond McCrea	4,565	12.2	3
Belfast West	George Albert Haffey	2,399	5.4	5
East Antrim	Jim Allister	13,926	36.5	2
East Londonderry	James McClure	12,207	23.8	2
Foyle	Gregory Campbell	15,923	30.5	2
Lagan Valley	William Beattie	6,801	16.8	2
Mid Ulster	William McCrea	16,174	30.0	1
North Antrim	Ian Paisley	23,922	54.2	1
South Antrim	Roy Thompson	10,935	28.2	2
South Down	Cecil Harvey	3,743	7.3	4
Strangford	Simpson Gibson	11,716	30.0	2
Upper Bann	Jim Wells	4,547	10.4	3

=== By-elections, 1983–86 ===
Election	Candidate	Votes	%	Position
1986 Belfast East by-election	Peter Robinson	27,607	81.0	1
1986 Mid Ulster by-election	William McCrea	23,695	46.1	1
1986 North Antrim by-election	Ian Paisley	33,937	97.4	1

=== 1987 general election ===
Constituency	Candidate	Votes	%	Position
Belfast East	Peter Robinson	16,640	42.6	1
Foyle	Gregory Campbell	13,883	28.6	2
Mid Ulster	William McCrea	23,004	44.2	1
North Antrim	Ian Paisley	28,283	68.7	1

=== 1992 general election ===
Constituency	Candidate	Votes	%	Position
Belfast East	Peter Robinson	18,437	51.5	1
East Antrim	Nigel Dodds	9,544	24.3	2
Foyle	Gregory Campbell	13,705	26.4	2
Mid Ulster	William McCrea	23,181	42.3	1
North Antrim	Ian Paisley	23,152	50.9	1
North Down	Denny Vitty	4,414	9.8	4
Strangford	Sammy Wilson	10,606	23.7	2

=== 1997 general election ===
Constituency	Candidate	Votes	%	Position
Belfast East	Peter Robinson	16,640	42.6	1
East Antrim	Jack McKee	6,682	19.5	3
East Londonderry	Gregory Campbell	9,767	26.0	2
Foyle	William Hay	10,290	21.5	3
Lagan Valley	Edwin Poots	6,005	13.6	3
Mid Ulster	William McCrea	18,411	36.3	2
North Antrim	Ian Paisley	21,495	46.5	1
Strangford	Iris Robinson	12,579	30.2	2
Upper Bann	Mervyn Carrick	5,482	11.5	4

=== By-elections, 1997–2001 ===
Election	Candidate	Votes	%	Position
2000 South Antrim by-election	William McCrea	11,601	38.0	1

=== 2001 general election ===
Constituency	Candidate	Votes	%	Position
Belfast East	Peter Robinson	15,667	42.5	1
Belfast North	Nigel Dodds	16,718	40.8	1
Belfast West	Eric Smyth	2,641	6.4	3
East Antrim	Sammy Wilson	12,973	36.0	2
East Londonderry	Gregory Campbell	12,813	32.1	1
Foyle	William Hay	7,414	15.2	3
Lagan Valley	Edwin Poots	6,164	13.4	3
Mid Ulster	Ian McCrea	15,549	31.1	2
Newry and Armagh	Paul Berry	10,795	19.4	3
North Antrim	Ian Paisley	24,539	49.9	1
South Antrim	William McCrea	15,355	34.8	2
South Down	Jim Wells	7,802	15.0	4
Strangford	Iris Robinson	18,532	42.8	1
Upper Bann	David Simpson	15,037	29.5	2

=== 2005 general election ===
Constituency	Candidate	Votes	%	Position
Belfast East	Peter Robinson	15,152	49.1	1
Belfast North	Nigel Dodds	13,935	45.6	1
Belfast South	Jimmy Spratt	9,104	28.4	2
Belfast West	Diane Dodds	3,652	10.6	3
East Antrim	Sammy Wilson	15,766	49.6	1
East Londonderry	Gregory Campbell	15,225	42.9	1
Fermanagh and South Tyrone	Arlene Foster	14,056	28.8	2
Foyle	William Hay	6,557	14.1	3
Lagan Valley	Jeffrey Donaldson	23,289	54.7	1
Mid Ulster	Ian McCrea	10,665	23.5	2
Newry and Armagh	Paul Berry	9,311	18.4	3
North Antrim	Ian Paisley	25,156	54.8	1
North Down	Peter Weir	11,324	35.1	2
South Antrim	William McCrea	14,507	38.2	1
South Down	Jim Wells	8,815	18.3	3
Strangford	Iris Robinson	20,921	56.5	1
Upper Bann	David Simpson	16,679	37.6	1
West Tyrone	Thomas Buchanan	7,742	17.8	3

=== 2010 general election ===
Constituency	Candidate	Votes	%	Position
Belfast East	Peter Robinson	11,306	32.8	2
Belfast North	Nigel Dodds	14,812	40.0	1
Belfast South	Jimmy Spratt	8,100	23.7	2
Belfast West	William Humphrey	2,436	7.6	3
East Antrim	Sammy Wilson	13,993	45.9	1
East Londonderry	Gregory Campbell	12,097	34.6	1
Foyle	Maurice Devenney	4,489	11.8	3
Lagan Valley	Jeffrey Donaldson	18,199	49.8	1
Mid Ulster	Ian McCrea	5,876	14.4	2
Newry and Armagh	William Irwin	5,764	12.8	4
North Antrim	Ian Paisley Jr	19,672	46.4	1
South Antrim	William McCrea	11,536	33.9	1
South Down	Jim Wells	3,645	8.6	3
Strangford	Jim Shannon	14,926	45.9	1
Upper Bann	David Simpson	14,000	33.8	1
West Tyrone	Thomas Buchanan	7,365	19.8	2

=== By-elections, 2010–15 ===
Election	Candidate	Votes	%	Position
2011 Belfast West by-election	Brian Kingston	1,393	6.1	4

=== 2015 general election ===
Constituency	Candidate	Votes	%	Position
Belfast East	Gavin Robinson	19,575	49.3	1
Belfast North	Nigel Dodds	19,096	47.0	1
Belfast South	Jonathan Bell	8,654	22.2	2
Belfast West	Frank McCoubrey	2,773	7.8	4
East Antrim	Sammy Wilson	12,103	36.1	1
East Londonderry	Gregory Campbell	14,663	42.2	1
Foyle	Gary Middleton	4,573	12.4	3
Lagan Valley	Jeffrey Donaldson	19,055	47.9	1
Mid Ulster	Ian McCrea	5,465	13.4	3
North Antrim	Ian Paisley Jr	18,107	43.2	1
North Down	Alex Easton	8,487	23.6	2
South Antrim	William McCrea	10,993	30.1	2
South Down	Jim Wells	3,486	8.2	4
Strangford	Jim Shannon	15,053	44.4	1
Upper Bann	David Simpson	15,430	32.7	1
West Tyrone	Thomas Buchanan	6,747	17.5	2

=== 2017 general election ===
Constituency	Candidate	Votes	%	Position
Belfast East	Gavin Robinson	23,917	55.8	1
Belfast North	Nigel Dodds	21,240	46.2	1
Belfast South	Emma Little-Pengelly	13,299	30.4	1
Belfast West	Frank McCoubrey	5,455	13.4	2
East Antrim	Sammy Wilson	21,873	57.3	1
East Londonderry	Gregory Campbell	19,273	48.1	1
Foyle	Gary Middleton	7,398	16.1	3
Lagan Valley	Jeffrey Donaldson	26,762	59.6	1
Mid Ulster	Keith Buchanan	12,565	26.9	2
Newry and Armagh	William Irwin	13,177	24.6	2
North Antrim	Ian Paisley Jr	28,521	58.9	1
North Down	Alex Easton	14,940	38.0	2
South Antrim	Paul Girvan	16,508	38.2	1
South Down	Diane Forsythe	8,867	17.4	3
Strangford	Jim Shannon	24,036	62.0	1
Upper Bann	David Simpson	22,317	43.5	1
West Tyrone	Thomas Buchanan	11,718	26.9	2

=== By-elections, 2017–2019 ===
By-election	Candidate	Votes	%	Position
2018 West Tyrone by-election	Thomas Buchanan	8,390	23.9	2

=== 2019 general election ===
Constituency	Candidate	Votes	%	Position
Belfast East	Gavin Robinson	20,874	49.2	1
Belfast North	Nigel Dodds	21,135	43.1	2
Belfast South	Emma Little-Pengelly	11,678	24.7	2
Belfast West	Frank McCoubrey	5,220	13.5	3
East Antrim	Sammy Wilson	16,781	45.3	1
East Londonderry	Gregory Campbell	15,765	40.1	1
Foyle	Gary Middleton	4,773	10.1	3
Lagan Valley	Jeffrey Donaldson	19,586	43.1	1
Mid Ulster	Keith Buchanan	10,936	24.5	2
Newry and Armagh	William Irwin	11,000	21.7	2
North Antrim	Ian Paisley Jr	20,860	47.4	1
North Down	Alex Easton	15,390	37.9	2
South Antrim	Paul Girvan	15,149	35.3	1
South Down	Glyn Hanna	7,619	15.3	3
Strangford	Jim Shannon	17,705	47.2	1
Upper Bann	Carla Lockhart	20,501	41.0	1
West Tyrone	Thomas Buchanan	9,066	22.0	2
