= List of MPs for constituencies in Northern Ireland (1987–1992) =

- Colours on map indicate the party allegiance of each constituency's MP.

This is a list of members of Parliament (MPs) elected to the House of Commons of the United Kingdom by Northern Irish constituencies for the 50st Parliament of the United Kingdom (1987 to 1992). There are 17 such constituencies, nine of which were represented by Unionists, three SDLP, three DUP, one Sinn Féin and one UPUP. It includes MPs elected at the 1987 United Kingdom general election, held on 11 June 1987.

The list is sorted by the name of the MP.

== Composition ==
Affiliation	Members
Ulster Unionist	9
SDLP	3
DUP	3
Sinn Féin	1
UPUP	1
Total	17

== MPs ==
Constituency	Party	MP
Antrim East	UUP	Roy Beggs
Antrim North	DUP	Ian Paisley
Antrim South	UUP	Clifford Forsythe
Belfast East	DUP	Peter Robinson
Belfast North	UUP	Cecil Walker
Belfast South	UUP	Martin Smyth
Belfast West	Sinn Féin	Gerry Adams
Down North	UPUP	Jim Kilfedder
Down South	SDLP	Eddie McGrady
Fermanagh and South Tyrone	UUP	Ken Maginnis
Foyle	SDLP	John Hume
Lagan Valley	UUP	James Molyneaux
Londonderry East	UUP	William Ross
Mid Ulster	DUP	William McCrea
Newry and Armagh	SDLP	Seamus Mallon
Strangford	UUP	John Taylor
Upper Bann	UUP	Harold McCusker

- David Trimble of the Ulster Unionist Party was elected in the 1990 Upper Bann by-election
