= Ulster Unionist Party leadership election, 1995 =

Two leadership elections were held in the Ulster Unionist Party in 1995:

- March 1995 Ulster Unionist Party leadership election
- September 1995 Ulster Unionist Party leadership election
