= Elections in Ireland =

Elections in Ireland may refer to:

- Elections in the Republic of Ireland
- Elections in Northern Ireland
- Elections in the United Kingdom (from 1801 to 1918)
- Elections to the Irish House of Commons (abolished in 1800)
