= September 1995 Ulster Unionist Party leadership election =

- 8 September 1995
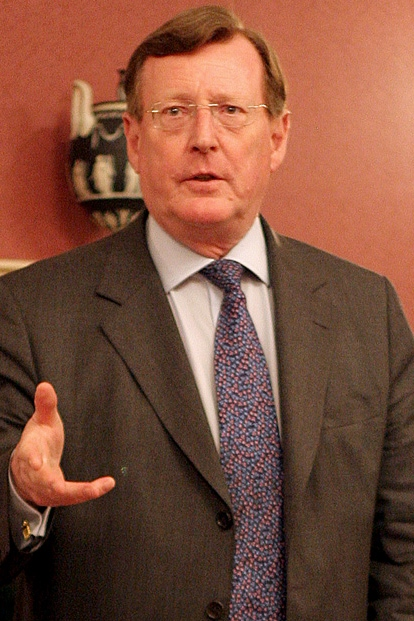

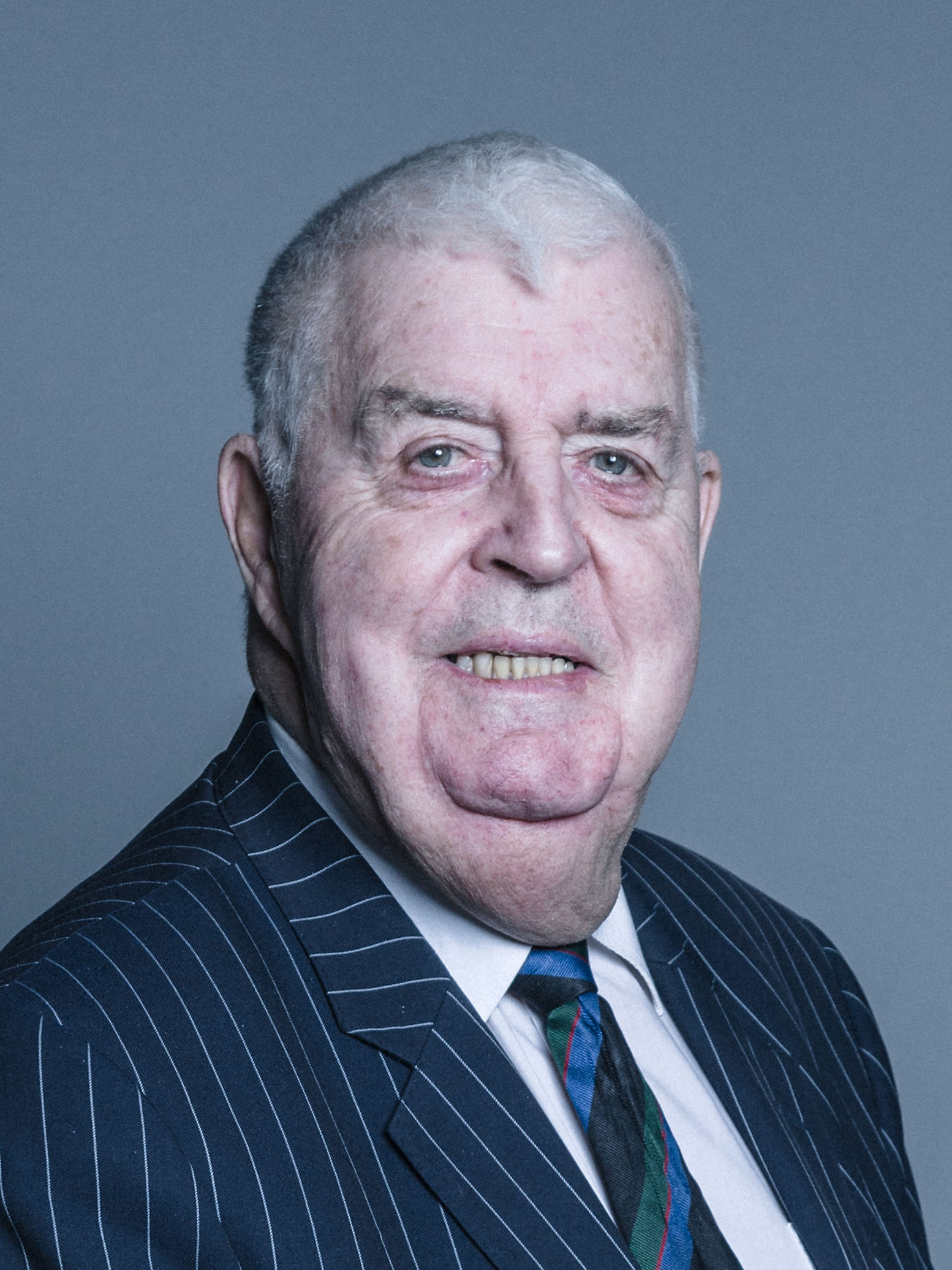
Candidate	David Trimble	John Taylor	Ken Maginnis
First Ballot	287	226	117
Percentage	35.6%	28.0%	14.5%
Final Ballot	466	333	Withdrew
Percentage	58.3%	41.7%	Withdrew
Candidate	William Ross	Martin Smyth
First Ballot	116	60
Percentage	14.4%	7.4%
Final Ballot	Eliminated	Eliminated
Percentage	Eliminated	Eliminated
Leader before election
James Molyneaux
Elected Leader
David Trimble

The September 1995 Ulster Unionist Party leadership election began on 28 August 1995 when James Molyneaux resigned as leader of the Ulster Unionist Party following a year of political setbacks for his party. Lee Reynolds, a Young Unionist had contested the leadership at the Ulster Unionist Council AGM in March 1995, receiving a small but significant number of votes. It was widely speculated that David Trimble was one of those behind Reynolds's candidature, although Trimble, his aides and Reynolds's supporters all denied this at the time and subsequently.

The UUP has held a leadership election every March since at least the Ulster Unionist Council constitution was altered in 1973, however it is rarely contested.

Molyneaux's successor was elected by delegates to the Ulster Unionist Council met on 8 September 1995. After three rounds of voting the election was won by David Trimble.

== Candidates ==
- Ken Maginnis, MP for Fermanagh and South Tyrone
- William Ross, MP for East Londonderry
- Martin Smyth, MP for Belfast South and Grand Master of the Orange Order
- John Taylor, MP for Strangford and a former minister in the Government of Northern Ireland
- David Trimble, MP for Upper Bann who had recently received strong attention for his role in a disputed Orange Order march at Drumcree

== Results ==
At the meeting delegates to the Ulster Unionist Council voted in a succession of ballots until one candidate had an absolute majority.

Candidate	Total					
Candidate	Round 1		Round 2		Round 3	
Candidate	Votes	%	Votes	%	Votes	%
David Trimble ✓	287	35.6	353	43.6	466	58.3
John Taylor	226	28	255	31.5	333	41.7
Ken Maginnis (Note: Candidate withdrew) ✗	117	14.5	110	13.6		
William Ross ✗	116	14.4	91	11.2		
Martin Smyth ✗	60	7.4				
Total	806	100	809	100	799	100

After the third round, David Trimble was elected.
