= Lagan Valley (UK Parliament constituency) =

UK Parliament constituency (since 1983)

Coordinates: 54.509°N 6.047°W

- County constituency for the House of Commons
- Interactive map of boundaries from 2024
- Location within Northern Ireland
- District: Armagh City, Banbridge and Craigavon; Lisburn and Castlereagh
- Major settlements: Lisburn

Current constituency
- Created: 1983
- Member of Parliament: Sorcha Eastwood (Alliance)
- Seats: 1
- Created from: South Antrim; Belfast South; North Down; South Down

Lagan Valley is a Northern Ireland parliamentary constituency in the House of Commons of the United Kingdom covering the area of the Lagan Valley including the south part of County Antrim and the north-west part of County Down.

Its MP since the 2024 general election is Sorcha Eastwood of the Alliance Party. This was the first time since its creation it did not elect a unionist MP.

Map of boundaries 2010–2024

== Boundaries ==
The seat was created in 1983, as part of an expansion of Northern Ireland's constituencies from 12 to 17, and was predominantly made up from parts of South Antrim and North Down in the area of the River Lagan. In their original proposals, in January 1980, the boundary commission proposed calling it "Lagan". In further revisions in 1995 it lost some areas to both Belfast West and Strangford.

1983–1997	The district of Lisburn, and in the borough of Castlereagh the ward of Carryduff.
1997–2010	In the district of Lisburn, the wards of Ballinderry, Ballymacash, Ballymacbrennan, Ballymacoss, Blaris, Derryaghy, Dromara, Drumbo, Dunmurry, Glenavy, Harmony Hill, Hilden, Hillhall, Hillsborough, Knockmore, Lagan Valley, Lambeg, Lisnagarvey, Maghaberry, Magheralave, Maze, Moira, Old Warren, Seymour Hill, Tonagh, and Wallace Park; and in the district of Banbridge, the wards of Dromore North, Dromore South, Gransha, and Quilly.
2010–2024	In the district of Banbridge, the wards of Dromore North, Dromore South, Gransha, and Quilly; and in the city of Lisburn, the wards of Ballinderry, Ballymacash, Ballymacbrennan, Ballymacoss, Blaris, Dromara, Drumbo, Harmony Hill, Hilden, Hillhall, Hillsborough, Knockmore, Lagan Valley, Lambeg, Lisnagarvey, Maghaberry, Magheralave, Maze, Moira, Old Warren, Seymour Hill, Tonagh, Wallace Park, and that part of Derryaghy ward lying to the south and east of the Derryaghy and Lagmore townland boundary.
2024–	In the district of Armagh City, Banbridge and Craigavon, the wards of Aghagallon, the part of the Donaghcloney ward to the east of the western boundary of the 2010–2024 Lagan Valley constituency, Dromore, the part of the Gransha ward to the north of the southern boundary of the 2010–2024 Lagan Valley constituency, Magheralin, and Quilly; and in the district of Lisburn and Castlereagh, the wards of Ballinderry, Ballymacash, Ballymacbrennan, Ballymacoss, Blaris, Dromara, Harmony Hill, Hilden, Hillhall, Hillsborough, Knockmore, Lagan, Lagan Valley, Lambeg, Lisnagarvey, Maghaberry, Magheralave, Maze, Moira, Old Warren, Ravernet, Wallace Park, and White Mountain.

== Members of Parliament ==
MPs from Lagan Valley have included two party leaders: James Molyneaux, leader of the Ulster Unionist Party from 1979 to 1995 (having represented South Antrim from 1970 to 1979), and Jeffrey Donaldson, leader of the Democratic Unionist Party from 2021 to 2024, when he resigned as party leader and was suspended as a party member after being charged with historical sex offences.

Election	MP	Party
1983	James Molyneaux (Note: Knighted in 1996.)	UUP
1986 b	James Molyneaux	UUP
1987	James Molyneaux	UUP
1992	James Molyneaux	UUP
1997	Jeffrey Donaldson (Note: Knighted in 2016.)	UUP
2001	Jeffrey Donaldson	UUP
2004	Jeffrey Donaldson	DUP
2005	Jeffrey Donaldson	DUP
2010	Jeffrey Donaldson	DUP
2015	Jeffrey Donaldson	DUP
2017	Jeffrey Donaldson	DUP
2019	Jeffrey Donaldson	DUP
2024	Jeffrey Donaldson	Independent
2024	Sorcha Eastwood	Alliance

== Elections ==
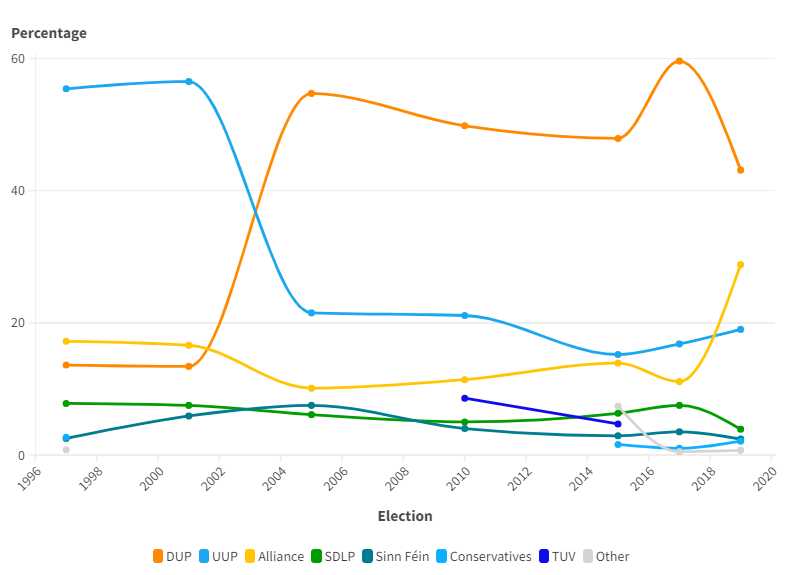

=== Elections in the 2020s ===
2024 general election: Lagan Valley
Party	Candidate	Votes	%	±%
Alliance	Sorcha Eastwood	18,618	37.9	+10.8
DUP	Jonathan Buckley	15,659	31.9	−11.5
UUP	Robbie Butler	11,157	22.7	+4.2
TUV	Lorna Smyth	2,186	4.5	New
SDLP	Simon Lee	1,028	2.1	−2.0
Green (NI)	Patricia Denvir	433	0.9	New
Majority		2,959	6.0	N/A
Turnout		49,081	60.0	−0.2
Registered electors		82,201		
Alliance gain from DUP		Swing	+11.15	

=== Elections in the 2010s ===
2019 general election: Lagan Valley
Party	Candidate	Votes	%	±%
DUP	Jeffrey Donaldson	19,586	43.1	−16.5
Alliance	Sorcha Eastwood	13,087	28.8	+17.7
UUP	Robbie Butler	8,606	19.0	+2.2
SDLP	Ally Haydock	1,758	3.9	−3.6
Sinn Féin	Gary McCleave	1,098	2.4	−1.1
NI Conservatives	Gary Hynds	955	2.1	+1.1
UKIP	Alan Love	315	0.7	New
Majority		6,499	14.3	−28.5
Turnout		45,405	60.0	−2.2
Registered electors		75,675		
DUP hold		Swing	−17.1	

This seat saw a swing towards the Alliance Party of over 17%, and the largest decrease in vote share for the DUP at the 2019 general election.

2017 general election: Lagan Valley
Party	Candidate	Votes	%	±%
DUP	Jeffrey Donaldson	26,762	59.6	+11.7
UUP	Robbie Butler	7,533	16.8	+1.6
Alliance	Aaron McIntyre	4,996	11.1	−2.8
SDLP	Pat Catney	3,384	7.5	+1.2
Sinn Féin	Jacqui Russell	1,567	3.5	+0.6
NI Conservatives	Ian Nickels	462	1.0	−0.6
Independent	Jonny Orr	222	0.5	−1.4
Majority		19,229	42.8	+10.1
Turnout		45,044	62.2	+6.3
Registered electors		72,380		
DUP hold		Swing	+5.1	

2015 general election: Lagan Valley
Party	Candidate	Votes	%	±%
DUP	Jeffrey Donaldson	19,055	47.9	−1.9
UUP	Alexander Redpath	6,055	15.2	−5.9
Alliance	Trevor Lunn	5,544	13.9	+2.5
SDLP	Pat Catney	2,500	6.3	+1.3
UKIP	Alan Love	2,200	5.5	New
TUV	Samuel Morrison	1,887	4.7	−3.9
Sinn Féin	Jacqui McGeough	1,144	2.9	−1.1
Independent	Jonny Orr	756	1.9	New
NI Conservatives	Helen Osborne	654	1.6	New
Majority		13,000	32.7	+4.0
Turnout		39,795	55.9	−0.1
Registered electors		71,152		
DUP hold		Swing	+2.0	

2010 general election: Lagan Valley
Party	Candidate	Votes	%	±%
DUP	Jeffrey Donaldson	18,199	49.8	−8.5
UCU-NF	Daphne Trimble	7,713	21.1	−1.8
Alliance	Trevor Lunn	4,174	11.4	+0.5
TUV	Keith Harbinson	3,154	8.6	+8.6
SDLP	Brian Heading	1,835	5.0	−1.1
Sinn Féin	Paul Butler	1,465	4.0	−3.5
Majority		10,486	28.7	−4.5
Turnout		36,540	56.0	−4.2
Registered electors		65,257		
DUP hold		Swing	−3.4	

=== Elections in the 2000s ===
2005 general election: Lagan Valley
Party	Candidate	Votes	%	±%
DUP	Jeffrey Donaldson	23,289	54.7	+41.3
UUP	Basil McCrea	9,172	21.5	−35.0
Alliance	Seamus Close	4,316	10.1	−6.5
Sinn Féin	Paul Butler	3,197	7.5	+1.6
SDLP	Patricia Lewsley	2,598	6.1	−1.4
Majority		14,117	33.2	N/A
Turnout		42,572	60.2	−3.0
Registered electors		70,238		
DUP gain from UUP		Swing	+38.1	

2001 general election: Lagan Valley
Party	Candidate	Votes	%	±%
UUP	Jeffrey Donaldson	25,966	56.5	+1.1
Alliance	Seamus Close	7,624	16.6	−0.6
DUP	Edwin Poots	6,164	13.4	−0.2
SDLP	Patricia Lewsley	3,462	7.5	−0.3
Sinn Féin	Paul Butler	2,725	5.9	+3.4
Majority		18,342	39.9	−1.7
Turnout		45,941	63.2	+1.1
Registered electors		72,671		
UUP hold		Swing	+0.9	

=== Elections in the 1990s ===
1997 general election: Lagan Valley
Party	Candidate	Votes	%	±%
UUP	Jeffrey Donaldson	24,560	55.4	−5.4
Alliance	Seamus Close	7,635	17.2	+4.5
DUP	Edwin Poots	6,005	13.6	New
SDLP	Dolores Kelly	3,436	7.8	−1.7
NI Conservatives	Stuart E. Sexton	1,212	2.7	−6.3
Sinn Féin	Sue Ramsey	1,110	2.5	+0.4
Workers' Party	Frances McCarthy	203	0.5	−0.7
Natural Law	Hugh Finlay	149	0.3	New
Majority		16,925	38.2	−9.9
Turnout		44,310	62.1	−5.2
Registered electors		71,341		
UUP hold		Swing	−8.5	

1992 general election: Lagan Valley
Party	Candidate	Votes	%	±%
UUP	James Molyneaux	29,772	60.8	−9.2
Alliance	Seamus Close	6,207	12.7	−1.1
SDLP	Hugh Lewsley	4,626	9.5	+2.6
NI Conservatives	Timothy R. Coleridge	4,423	9.0	New
Sinn Féin	Patrick Joseph Rice	3,346	6.8	+0.4
Workers' Party	Ann Marie Lowry	582	1.2	−1.7
Majority		23,565	48.1	−8.1
Turnout		48,956	67.3	+2.9
Registered electors		72,645		
UUP hold		Swing		

=== Elections in the 1980s ===
1987 general election: Lagan Valley
Party	Candidate	Votes	%	±%
UUP	James Molyneaux	29,101	70.0	+10.8
Alliance	Seamus Close	5,728	13.8	+2.5
SDLP	Billy McDonnell	2,888	6.9	+0.5
Sinn Féin	Patrick Joseph Rice	2,656	6.4	+2.1
Workers' Party	John Lowry	1,215	2.9	+0.9
Majority		23,373	56.2	+13.8
Turnout		41,588	64.4	−3.2
Registered electors		64,873		
UUP hold		Swing		

1986 Lagan Valley by-election
Party	Candidate	Votes	%	±%
UUP	James Molyneaux	32,514	90.7	+31.5
Workers' Party	John Lowry	3,328	9.3	+7.3
Majority		29,186	81.4	+39.0
Turnout		35,842	57.8	−9.8
Registered electors		63,244		
UUP hold		Swing		

1983 general election: Lagan Valley
Party	Candidate	Votes	%	±%
UUP	James Molyneaux	24,017	59.2	
DUP	William John Beattie	6,801	16.8	
Alliance	Seamus Close	4,593	11.3	
SDLP	Cormac Joseph Boomer	2,603	6.4	
Sinn Féin	Richard McAuley	1,751	4.3	
Workers' Party	Gerard Loughlin	809	2.0	
Majority		17,216	42.4	
Turnout		40,574	67.6	
Registered electors		60,051		
UUP win (new seat)				
