= John Lowry (Irish politician) =

21st-century Irish politician

General Secretary of the Workers' Party
- In office 2002–2014

Personal details
- Born: Lower Falls, Belfast, Northern Ireland
- Party: Workers' Party

John Terence Lowry is the former General Secretary of the Workers' Party in Ireland. He is a native of the Lower Falls area of Belfast.

== Career ==
Lowry first stood for the Workers' Party in the 1986 Lagan Valley by-election. As the only candidate to challenge Jim Molyneaux of the Ulster Unionist Party, he picked up 9.3% of the vote.

Lowry stood again in Lagan Valley at the 1987 general election, but owing to his facing several candidates, his vote dropped below 3%. For the 1992 general election he moved to contest Belfast West, and contested this unsuccessfully in 1997, 2001, 2005 and 2015.

Lowry was also the Workers' Party's candidate in the Northern Ireland constituency at the European Parliament election in 1994, coming well down the field with only 0.45% of the votes cast. He was the head of the party's list in Belfast West for the Northern Ireland Forum election of 1996, and contested the same seat at each election to the Northern Ireland Assembly until 2011. Lowry also stood for Belfast City Council in the Lower Falls electoral area in each election from 1993 to 2011 and Court electoral area in 2014.

In 2005, Lowry was one of three people to post bail for Workers' Party President Seán Garland, but forfeited £9,000 after Garland failed to appear in court.

Lowry is registered with the Electoral Commission as the leader and nominating officer of the Workers' Party in Northern Ireland.

Party political offices
Preceded by Pat Quearney	General Secretary of the Workers' Party (Ireland); 2001?–present	Incumbent
