= 1986 Northern Ireland by-elections =

By-elections held in January 1986

- 23 January 1986

15 of 17 Northern Irish seats in the United Kingdom Parliament
	First party	Second party
Party	UUP	DUP
Seats won	10	3
Seat change	▼1	Steady
Popular vote	302,198	85,239
Percentage	51.7%	23.0%
Swing	▲13.1%	▼5.5%
	Third party	Fourth party
Party	SDLP	UPUP
Seats won	1	1
Seat change	▲1	Steady
Popular vote	70,917	30,793
Percentage	12.1%	5.3%
Swing	▼3.1%	▲1.9%
- Left map shows the % of the vote received by resigning unionist anti-agreement candidates. Right map shows the % of the vote received by pro-agreement candidates. Bottom map shows the winning party by constituency - in all constituencies but Armagh and Newry, resigning unionist candidates were re-elected.

The 1986 Northern Ireland by-elections were fifteen by-elections held on 23 January 1986, to fill vacancies in the Parliament of the United Kingdom caused by the resignation in December 1985 of all sitting Unionist Members of Parliament (MPs). The MPs, from the Ulster Unionist Party, Democratic Unionist Party and Ulster Popular Unionist Party, did this to highlight their opposition to the Anglo-Irish Agreement, signed the month before.

Each of the Unionist parties agreed not to contest seats previously held by the others, and each outgoing MP stood for re-election. 14 of the 15 were re-elected, often with large margins. The sole exception was in the Newry and Armagh by-election, where Seamus Mallon of the Social Democratic and Labour Party unseated Jim Nicholson (UUP).

== Other candidates ==
Of the two Northern Ireland seats not held by unionists, Foyle was held by the nationalist Social Democratic and Labour Party (SDLP), while Belfast West was held by the republican party Sinn Féin. These MPs did not resign and their seats were not contested.

The SDLP and Sinn Féin regarded the resignations as a publicity stunt, and were reluctant to take part in the resulting by-elections. In the event, they contested only the seats which they believed to have an anti-unionist majority.

The Alliance Party of Northern Ireland instructed its branches to nominate a candidate for each by-election, but many were reluctant, and ultimately, the party stood in only five seats. The small Workers' Party stood in nine seats.

It appeared that the incumbent would be the only candidate in four constituencies. This would have produced the first uncontested elections for the House of Commons since the Armagh by-election of 1954. In order to ensure that there was a contest and that the Unionists would be able to demonstrate their point, Wesley Robert Williamson changed his name by deed poll to "Peter Barry", Peter Barry being Minister for Foreign Affairs of the Republic of Ireland. "Peter Barry" stood in these four constituencies under the label "For the Anglo-Irish Agreement", allowing a contest, but did not campaign.

The unusual circumstances led this to be the greatest number of UK parliamentary by-elections held on a single day.

== Results ==
=== Aggregate results ===
The aggregated results for all constituencies are shown below. Changes are compared to those for the 15 constituencies in the 1983 general election.

Results of the 1986 Northern Ireland by-elections
Political party	Leader	Position	Candidates	MPs					Votes		
Political party	Leader	Position	Candidates	Total	Gained	Lost	Net	Of total (%)	Total	Of total (%)	Change (%)
UUP	James Molyneaux	Anti-agreement	11	10	0	1	▼1	66.7	302,198	51.7	▲13.1
DUP	Ian Paisley	Anti-agreement	3	3	0	0	Steady	20.0	85,239	14.6	▼5.5
SDLP	John Hume	Pro-agreement	4	1	1	0	▲1	6.7	70,917	12.1	▼3.1
Sinn Féin	Gerry Adams	Anti-agreement	4	0	0	0	Steady	0.0	38,848	6.6	▼4.7
Alliance	John Cushnahan	Pro-agreement	5	0	0	0	Steady	0.0	32,095	5.5	▼3.5
UPUP	James Kilfedder	Anti-agreement	1	1	0	0	Steady	6.7	30,793	5.3	▲1.3
Workers' Party	Tomás Mac Giolla	Pro-agreement	9	0	0	0	Steady	0.0	18,148	3.1	▲1.3
For the Anglo-Irish Agreement	Wesley Robert Williamson running as 'Peter Barry'	Pro-agreement	4	0	0	0	Steady	0.0	6,379	1.1	N/A
Blank and invalid votes										—	—
Total			41	15			0	100	584,617	100	0.0
Registered voters, and turnout									951,571	61.44	

Vote share by party position on Anglo-Irish Agreement
Anti-Agreement Unionists	71.6%
Pro-Agreement candidates	21.8%
Anti-Agreement Republicans (Sinn Féin)	6.6%

All but one of the Unionists were re-elected, many with extremely large majorities. The largest of all went to Ian Paisley in North Antrim. He won 97.4% of the vote, the highest percentage polled by any candidate in a UK by-election since the 1940 Middleton and Prestwich by-election.

The sole exception to this pattern was the Newry and Armagh by-election, where Seamus Mallon of the SDLP was able to take the seat. Former Cabinet Minister Enoch Powell was able to narrowly survive a strong challenge from the SDLP in South Down and was subsequently defeated at the following year's general election. In the western constituencies of Mid Ulster and Fermanagh and South Tyrone, the Unionist candidates were able to survive with less than 50% of the vote due to a split Nationalist vote. Both seats were gained by Sinn Féin in later elections.

The results of the fifteen by-elections were cited by Unionists as a rejection of the Agreement by the Northern Irish electorate, but did not succeed in repealing it.

=== Antrim ===
1986 East Antrim by-election
Party	Candidate	Votes	%	±%
UUP	Roy Beggs	30,386	84.9	+47.5
Alliance	Seán Neeson	5,405	15.1	−4.9
Majority		24,981	69.8	+68.9
Turnout		35,791	59.2	−5.9
UUP hold		Swing	N/A	

1986 North Antrim by-election
Party	Candidate	Votes	%	±%
DUP	Ian Paisley	33,937	97.4	+43.2
For the Anglo-Irish Agreement	Peter Barry	515	2.6	N/A
Majority		33,024	94.8	
Turnout		34,452	54.7	
DUP hold		Swing	N/A	

1986 South Antrim by-election
Party	Candidate	Votes	%	±%
UUP	Clifford Forsythe	30,087	94.1	+48.4
For the Anglo-Irish Agreement	Peter Barry	1,870	5.9	N/A
Majority		28,217	88.3	+70.8
Turnout		31,957	53.5	−12.0
UUP hold		Swing	N/A	

=== Belfast ===
1986 Belfast East by-election
Party	Candidate	Votes	%	±%
DUP	Peter Robinson	27,607	81.0	+35.7
Alliance	Oliver Napier	5,917	17.4	−6.7
Workers' Party	Frank Cullen	578	1.7	+0.6
Majority		21,690	63.6	
Turnout		34,102	60.2	
DUP hold		Swing		

1986 Belfast North by-election
Party	Candidate	Votes	%	±%
UUP	Cecil Walker	21,649	71.5	+35.3
Alliance	Paul Maguire	5,072	16.7	+7.6
Workers' Party	Seamus Lynch	3,563	11.8	+6.1
Majority		16,577	54.8	
Turnout		30,284	51.5	−17.9
UUP hold		Swing		

1986 Belfast South by-election
Party	Candidate	Votes	%	±%
UUP	Martin Smyth	21,771	71.3	+21.3
Alliance	David Cook	7,635	25.0	+1.1
Workers' Party	Gerry Carr	1,109	3.6	
Majority		14,136	46.3	+1.3
Turnout		30,515	56.9	
UUP hold		Swing		

=== Down ===
1986 North Down by-election
Party	Candidate	Votes	%	±%
UPUP	James Kilfedder	30,793	79.2	+23.1
Alliance	John Cushnahan	8,066	20.8	−1.3
Majority		22,727	58.4	+24.4
Turnout		38,859	62.8	−3.4
UPUP hold		Swing		

1986 South Down by-election
Party	Candidate	Votes	%	±%
UUP	Enoch Powell	24,963	48.4	+8.1
SDLP	Eddie McGrady	23,121	44.8	+5.5
Sinn Féin	Hugh McDowell	2,963	5.7	−2.2
Workers' Party	Sean Magee	522	1.0	−0.7
Majority		1,842	3.6	
Turnout		51,569	73.8	−3.9
UUP hold		Swing		

=== Newry and Armagh ===
1986 Newry and Armagh by-election
Party	Candidate	Votes	%	±%
SDLP	Seamus Mallon	22,694	45.5	+8.7
UUP	Jim Nicholson	20,111	40.3	+0.2
Sinn Féin	Jim McAllister	6,609	13.2	−7.7
Workers' Party	Patrick McCusker	515	1.0	−1.2
Majority		2,583	5.2	N/A
Turnout		49,929	76.9	+0.9
Registered electors		65,142		
SDLP gain from UUP		Swing		

=== Other constituencies ===
1986 Fermanagh and South Tyrone by-election
Party	Candidate	Votes	%	±%
UUP	Ken Maginnis	27,857	49.7	+2.1
Sinn Féin	Owen Carron	15,278	27.2	−7.6
SDLP	Austin Currie	12,081	21.5	+5.0
Workers' Party	David Kettyles	864	1.5	−0.4
Majority		12,579	22.5	+9.7
Turnout		56,080	80.4	−8.2
UUP hold		Swing		

1986 Lagan Valley by-election
Party	Candidate	Votes	%	±%
UUP	Jim Molyneaux	32,514	90.7	+31.5
Workers' Party	John Lowry	3,328	9.3	+7.0
Majority		29,186	81.4	+39.0
Turnout		35,842	57.8	−9.8
UUP hold		Swing		

1986 East Londonderry by-election
Party	Candidate	Votes	%	±%
UUP	William Ross	30,922	93.9	+56.0
For the Anglo-Irish Agreement	Peter Barry	2,001	6.1	N/A
Majority		28,921	87.8	+73.7
Turnout		32,923	46.8	–29.5
UUP hold		Swing		

1986 Mid Ulster by-election
Party	Candidate	Votes	%	±%
DUP	William McCrea	23,695	46.1	+16.4
Sinn Féin	Danny Morrison	13,998	27.2	−2.8
SDLP	Adrian Colton	13,021	25.3	+2.8
Workers' Party	Thomas Owens	691	1.3	±0.0
Majority		6,967	19.3	
Turnout		51,405	77.6	−6.7
DUP hold		Swing		

1986 Strangford by-election
Party	Candidate	Votes	%	±%
UUP	John David Taylor	32,627	94.2	+45.4
For the Anglo-Irish Agreement	Peter Barry	1,993	5.8	N/A
Majority		30,634	88.5	+69.7
Turnout		34,620	55.0	−9.9
Registered electors		62,854		
UUP hold		Swing		

1986 Upper Bann by-election
Party	Candidate	Votes	%	±%
UUP	Harold McCusker	29,311	80.8	+23.9
Workers' Party	Tom French	6,978	19.2	+13.7
Majority		22,333	61.4	+20.4
Turnout		36,861	57.2	−14.8
Registered electors		63,484		
UUP hold		Swing		

== See also ==
- Lists of United Kingdom by-elections
- United Kingdom by-election records
- Five Constituencies Referendum
- July 2018 Australian federal by-elections
