= March 1995 Ulster Unionist Party leadership election =

← 1979	18 March 1995	September 1995 →
Candidate	James Molyneaux	Lee Reynolds
Popular vote	521	88
Percentage	85.6%	14.4%
Leader before election
James Molyneaux
Elected Leader
James Molyneaux

The March 1995 Ulster Unionist Party leadership election occurred at the Annual General Meeting of the Ulster Unionist Council on 18 March 1995. The UUP has had a leadership election every March since at least 1973, and this is one of the few occasions when it has been contested. James Molyneaux was re-elected as Leader with 86% of the votes. Lee Reynolds stood against Molyneaux and was proposed by future DUP Councillor Graham Craig and seconded by Ulster Unionist stalwart Gordon Lucy.

== Candidates ==
- James H. Molyneaux MP, incumbent leader since 1979
- Lee Reynolds, a 21-year-old student from Coleraine, member of the Young Unionists.

It was widely speculated that Ulster Unionist MP David Trimble was one of those behind Reynolds's candidature, although Trimble, his aides and Reynolds' supporters all denied this at the time and subsequently.

== Results ==
Candidate	Total	
Candidate	Votes	%
James Molyneaux ✓	521	84.2
Lee Reynolds	88	14.2
Spoilt ballots	10	1.6
Total	619	100

Whilst Molyneaux won by a massive margin, the number of delegates who did not vote for him was seen as a substantial number. Two days later independent North Down MP, Sir James Kilfedder died in London and that the subsequent by-election was not won by the UUP was seen as further evidence of Molyneaux's failings as leader after 15 years. Molyneaux resigned on 28 August and was replaced in September. Reynolds was later co-opted onto Belfast City Council as a member of the DUP and served as the DUP’s director of policy and as a special advisor to First Minister Arlene Foster.
