= 1986 East Londonderry by-election =

UK Parliamentary by-election

- 23 Jan 1986

Constituency of East Londonderry
- Turnout: 46.8% (▼29.5%)
	First party	Second party
Candidate	William Ross	"Peter Barry"
Party	UUP	"For the Anglo-Irish Agreement"
Popular vote	30,922	2,001
Percentage	93.9%	6.1%
Swing	▲56.0%	New
MP before election
William Ross
UUP
Subsequent MP
William Ross
UUP

The 1986 East Londonderry by-election was one of the fifteen 1986 Northern Ireland by-elections held on 23 January 1986, to fill vacancies in the Parliament of the United Kingdom caused by the resignation in December 1985 of all sitting Unionist Members of Parliament (MPs). The MPs, from the Ulster Unionist Party, Democratic Unionist Party and Ulster Popular Unionist Party, did this to highlight their opposition to the Anglo-Irish Agreement. Each of their parties agreed not to contest seats previously held by the others, and each outgoing MP stood for re-election.

== Result ==
1986 East Londonderry by-election
Party	Candidate	Votes	%	±%
UUP	William Ross	30,922	93.9	+56.0
"For the Anglo-Irish Agreement"	"Peter Barry" (Wesley Robert Williamson)	2,001	6.1	New
Majority		28,921	87.8	+73.7
Turnout		32,923	46.8	−29.5
Registered electors		70,038		
UUP hold		Swing	N/A	

== Other References ==
- British Parliamentary By Elections: Campaign literature from the by-elections
- CAIN: Westminster By-Elections (NI) - Thursday 23 January 1986
- Northern Ireland Elections: Westminster by-elections 1986
