= 1986 South Down by-election =

UK parliamentary by-election

← 1983	23 January 1986	1987 →

South Down constituency

	First party	Second party
Candidate	Enoch Powell	Eddie McGrady
Party	UUP	SDLP
Popular vote	24,963	23,121
Percentage	48.4%	44.8%
Swing	▲8.1%	▲5.5%
- Location of South Down within Northern Ireland
MP before election
Enoch Powell
Ulster Unionist Party
Elected MP
Enoch Powell
Ulster Unionist Party

The South Down by-election of 1986 was part of a co-ordinated series of by-elections aimed to show opposition to the Anglo Irish agreement. It resulted in the narrow victory of the incumbent Ulster Unionist Party, Enoch Powell, who increased his majority by 1,294 votes despite rising support for Irish Nationalist candidates. His opponent Eddie McGrady would later take the seat in the 1987 general election.

1986 South Down by-election
Party	Candidate	Votes	%	±%
UUP	Enoch Powell	24,963	48.4	+8.1
SDLP	Eddie McGrady	23,121	44.8	+5.5
Sinn Féin	Hugh McDowell	2,963	5.7	−2.2
Workers' Party	Sean Magee	522	1.0	−0.7
Majority		1,842	3.6	+2.6
Turnout		51,569	73.8	−3.9
Registered electors		69,843		
UUP hold		Swing		

== Previous result ==
General election 1983: South Down
Party	Candidate	Votes	%	±%
UUP	Enoch Powell	20,693	40.3	−9.7
SDLP	Eddie McGrady	20,145	39.3	+2.0
Sinn Féin	Patrick Fitzsimmons	4,074	7.9	New
DUP	Cecil Harvey	3,743	7.3	New
Alliance	Patrick Forde	1,823	3.6	−5.2
Workers' Party	Margaret Magee	851	1.7	New
Majority		548	1.0	−11.8
Turnout		51,329	77.7	+5.7
Registered electors		66,923		
UUP hold		Swing		
