= 1986 Belfast North by-election =

UK Parliamentary by-election

← 1983	23 Jan 1986	1987 →

Constituency of Belfast North
- Turnout: 51.5% (▼17.9%)
	First party	Second party	Third party
Candidate	Cecil Walker	Paul Maguire	Seamus Lynch
Party	UUP	Alliance	Workers' Party
Popular vote	21,649	5,072	3,563
Percentage	71.5%	16.7%	11.8%
Swing	▲35.3%	▲7.6%	▲6.1%
MP before election
Cecil Walker
UUP
Subsequent MP
Cecil Walker
UUP

The 1986 Belfast North by-election was one of the fifteen 1986 Northern Ireland by-elections held on 23 January 1986, to fill vacancies in the Parliament of the United Kingdom caused by the resignation in December 1985 of all sitting Unionist Members of Parliament (MPs). The MPs, from the Ulster Unionist Party, Democratic Unionist Party and Ulster Popular Unionist Party, did this to highlight their opposition to the Anglo-Irish Agreement. Each of their parties agreed not to contest seats previously held by the others, and each outgoing MP stood for re-election.

1986 Belfast North by-election
Party	Candidate	Votes	%	±%
UUP	Cecil Walker	21,649	71.5	+35.3
Alliance	Paul Richard Maguire	5,072	16.7	+7.6
Workers' Party	Seamus Lynch	3,563	11.8	+6.1
Majority		16,577	54.8	+38.1
Turnout		30,284	51.5	−17.9
Registered electors		59,791		
UUP hold		Swing		

== Other References ==
- British Parliamentary By Elections: Campaign literature from the by-elections
- CAIN: Westminster By-Elections (NI) - Thursday 23 January 1986
- Northern Ireland Elections: Westminster by-elections 1986
