= 1986 East Antrim by-election =

UK Parliamentary by-election

- 23 Jan 1986

Constituency of East Antrim
- Turnout: 59.2% (▼5.9%)
| | First party | Second party |
|---|---|---|
| Candidate | Roy Beggs | Seán Neeson |
| Party | UUP | Alliance |
| Popular vote | 30,396 | 5,405 |
| Percentage | 84.9% | 15.1% |
| Swing | ▲47.5% | ▼4.9% |
MP before election
Roy Beggs
UUP
Subsequent MP
Roy Beggs
UUP

The 1986 East Antrim by-election was one of the fifteen 1986 Northern Ireland by-elections held on 23 January 1986, to fill vacancies in the Parliament of the United Kingdom caused by the resignation in December 1985 of all sitting Unionist Members of Parliament (MPs). The MPs, from the Ulster Unionist Party, Democratic Unionist Party and Ulster Popular Unionist Party, did this to highlight their opposition to the Anglo-Irish Agreement. Each of their parties agreed not to contest seats previously held by the others, and each outgoing MP stood for re-election.

1986 East Antrim by-election
| Party | Candidate | Votes | % | ±% |
|---|---|---|---|---|
| UUP | Roy Beggs | 30,386 | 84.9 | +47.5 |
| Alliance | Seán Neeson | 5,405 | 15.1 | −4.9 |
| Majority | | 24,981 | 69.8 | +68.9 |
| Turnout | | 35,791 | 59.2 | −5.9 |
| Registered electors | | 60,780 | | |
| UUP hold | | Swing | | |

== Other References ==
- British Parliamentary By Elections: Campaign literature from the by-elections
- CAIN: Westminster By-Elections (NI) - Thursday 23 January 1986
- Northern Ireland Elections: Westminster by-elections 1986
