= 1986 Lagan Valley by-election =

UK Parliamentary by-election

← 1983	23 Jan 1986	1987 →

Constituency of Lagan Valley
- Turnout: 57.8% (▼9.8%)
	First party	Second party
		WPI
Candidate	James Henry Molyneaux	John Lowry
Party	UUP	Workers' Party
Popular vote	32,514	3,328
Percentage	90.7%	9.3%
Swing	▲31.5%	▲7.3%
MP before election
James Henry Molyneaux
UUP
Subsequent MP
James Henry Molyneaux
UUP

The 1986 Lagan Valley by-election was one of the fifteen 1986 Northern Ireland by-elections held on 23 January 1986, to fill vacancies in the Parliament of the United Kingdom caused by the resignation in December 1985 of all sitting Unionist Members of Parliament (MPs). The MPs, from the Ulster Unionist Party, Democratic Unionist Party and Ulster Popular Unionist Party, did this to highlight their opposition to the Anglo-Irish Agreement. Each of their parties agreed not to contest seats previously held by the others, and each outgoing MP stood for re-election.

1986 Lagan Valley by-election
Party	Candidate	Votes	%	±%
UUP	James Henry Molyneaux	32,514	90.7	+31.5
Workers' Party	John Lowry	3,328	9.3	+7.3
Majority		29,186	81.4	+39.0
Turnout		35,842	57.8	−9.8
Registered electors		63,244		
UUP hold		Swing		

== Other References ==
- British Parliamentary By Elections: Campaign literature from the by-elections
- CAIN: Westminster By-Elections (NI) - Thursday 23 January 1986
- Northern Ireland Elections: Westminster by-elections 1986
