= 1986 Upper Bann by-election =

Local government election in Northern Ireland

← 1983	23 January 1986	1987 →

South Down constituency
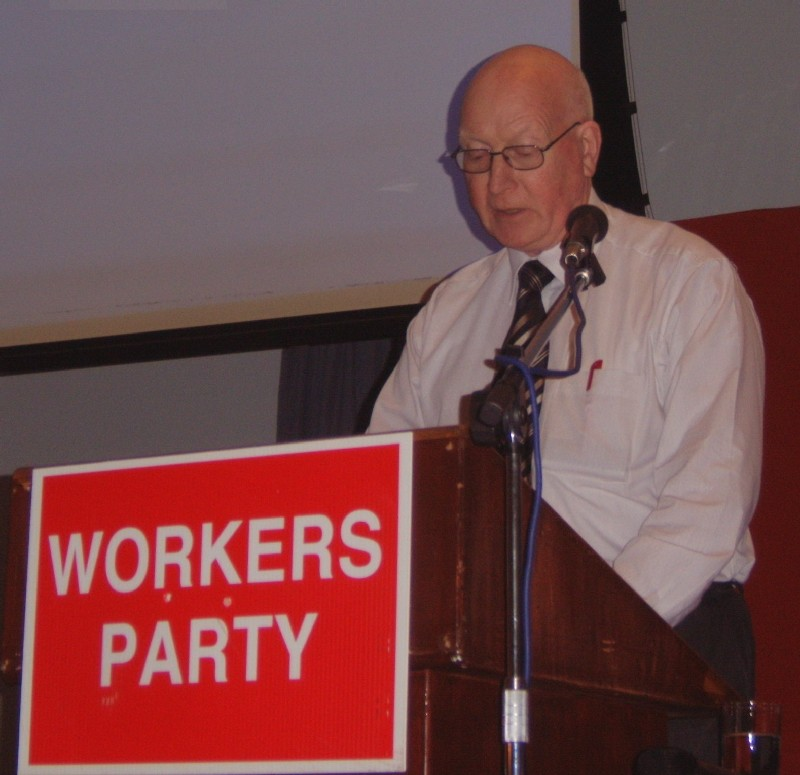
	First party	Second party
Candidate	Harold McCusker	Tom French
Party	UUP	Workers' Party
Popular vote	29,311	6,978
Percentage	80.8%	19.2%
Swing	▲23.9	▲13.7%
- Location of South Down within Northern Ireland
MP before election
Harold McCusker
Ulster Unionist Party
Elected MP
Harold McCusker
Ulster Unionist Party

The 1986 Upper Bann by-election was one of the fifteen 1986 Northern Ireland by-elections held on 23 January 1986, to fill vacancies in the Parliament of the United Kingdom caused by the resignation in December 1985 of all sitting Unionist Members of Parliament (MPs). The MPs, from the Ulster Unionist Party, Democratic Unionist Party and Ulster Popular Unionist Party, did this to highlight their opposition to the Anglo-Irish Agreement. Each of their parties agreed not to contest seats previously held by the others, and each outgoing MP stood for re-election.

1986 Upper Bann by-election
Party	Candidate	Votes	%	±%
UUP	Harold McCusker	29,311	80.8	+23.9
Workers' Party	Tom French	6,978	19.2	+13.7
Majority		22,333	61.4	+20.4
Turnout		36,861	57.2	−14.8
Registered electors		63,484		
UUP hold		Swing		

== Other references ==
- British Parliamentary By Elections: Campaign literature from the by-elections
- CAIN: Westminster By-Elections (NI) - Thursday 23 January 1986
- Northern Ireland Elections: Westminster by-elections 1986
