= 1986 North Down by-election =

UK Parliamentary by-election

← 1983	23 Jan 1986	1987 →

Constituency of North Down
- Turnout: 62.8% (▼3.4%)
	First party	Second party
Candidate	James Kilfedder	John Cushnahan
Party	UPUP	Alliance
Popular vote	30,793	8,066
Percentage	79.2%	20.8%
Swing	▲23.1%	▼1.3%
MP before election
James Kilfedder
UPUP
Subsequent MP
James Kilfedder
UPUP

The 1986 North Down by-election was one of the fifteen 1986 Northern Ireland by-elections held on 23 January 1986, to fill vacancies in the Parliament of the United Kingdom caused by the resignation in December 1985 of all sitting Unionist Members of Parliament (MPs). The MPs, from the Ulster Unionist Party, Democratic Unionist Party and Ulster Popular Unionist Party, did this to highlight their opposition to the Anglo-Irish Agreement. Each of their parties agreed not to contest seats previously held by the others, and each outgoing MP stood for re-election.

1986 North Down by-election
Party	Candidate	Votes	%	±%
UPUP	James Kilfedder	30,793	79.2	+23.1
Alliance	John Cushnahan	8,066	20.8	−1.3
Majority		22,727	58.4	+24.4
Turnout		38,859	62.8	−3.4
Registered electors		64,276		
UPUP hold		Swing		

== Other References ==
- British Parliamentary By Elections: Campaign literature from the by-elections
- CAIN: Westminster By-Elections (NI) - Thursday 23 January 1986
- Northern Ireland Elections: Westminster by-elections 1986
