= 1986 South Antrim by-election =

UK Parliamentary by-election

← 1983	23 Jan 1986	1987 →

Constituency of South Antrim
- Turnout: 53.5% (▼12.0%)
	First party	Second party
		FTAIA
Candidate	Clifford Forsythe	"Peter Barry"
Party	UUP	"For the Anglo-Irish Agreement"
Popular vote	30,087	1,870
Percentage	94.1%	5.9%
Swing	▲48.4%	New
MP before election
Clifford Forsythe
UUP
Subsequent MP
Clifford Forsythe
UUP

The 1986 South Antrim by-election was one of the fifteen 1986 Northern Ireland by-elections held on 23 January 1986, to fill vacancies in the Parliament of the United Kingdom caused by the resignation in December 1985 of all sitting Unionist Members of Parliament (MPs). The MPs, from the Ulster Unionist Party, Democratic Unionist Party and Ulster Popular Unionist Party, did this to highlight their opposition to the Anglo-Irish Agreement. Each of their parties agreed not to contest seats previously held by the others, and each outgoing MP stood for re-election.

1986 South Antrim by-election
Party	Candidate	Votes	%	±%
UUP	Clifford Forsythe	30,087	94.1	+48.4
"For the Anglo-Irish Agreement"	"Peter Barry" (Wesley Robert Williamson)	1,870	5.9	N/A
Majority		28,217	88.2	+70.8
Turnout		31,957	53.5	−12.0
Registered electors		60,780		
UUP hold		Swing		

== Other References ==
- British Parliamentary By Elections: Campaign literature from the by-elections
- CAIN: Westminster By-Elections (NI) - Thursday 23 January 1986
- Northern Ireland Elections: Westminster by-elections 1986
