= James Molyneaux, Baron Molyneaux of Killead =

British politician (1920–2015)

The Right Honourable The Lord Molyneaux of Killead KBE PC

11th Leader of the Ulster Unionist Party
- In office 7 September 1979 – 8 September 1995
- Preceded by: Harry West
- Succeeded by: David Trimble

Member of the House of Lords
- Lord Temporal
- Life peerage 10 June 1997 – 9 March 2015

Member of Parliament for Lagan Valley
- In office 9 June 1983 – 8 April 1997
- Preceded by: Constituency created
- Succeeded by: Jeffrey Donaldson

Member of Parliament for South Antrim
- In office 18 June 1970 – 13 May 1983
- Preceded by: Knox Cunningham
- Succeeded by: Clifford Forsythe

Personal details
- Born: James Henry Molyneaux; 27 August 1920 Killead, County Antrim, Ireland
- Died: 9 March 2015 (aged 94) Antrim, Northern Ireland
- Party: Ulster Unionist Party

Military service
- Allegiance: United Kingdom
- Branch/service: Royal Air Force
- Years of service: 1941–c.1947
- Rank: Flying officer
- Battles/wars: World War II

James Henry Molyneaux, Baron Molyneaux of Killead, KBE, PC (27 August 1920 – 9 March 2015), often known as Jim Molyneaux, was a unionist politician from Northern Ireland who served as leader of the Ulster Unionist Party (UUP) from 1979 to 1995, and as the Member of Parliament (MP) for South Antrim from 1970 to 1983, and later Lagan Valley from 1983 to 1997. An Orangeman, he was also Sovereign Grand Master of the Royal Black Institution from 1971 to 1995, and a leading member of the Conservative Monday Club.

== Early life ==
Born in Killead, a small village in County Antrim, to Sarah (née Gilmore) and William Molyneaux, James Molyneaux was educated at a nearby school in Aldergrove. Although he was a member of the Church of Ireland, he briefly attended a local Roman Catholic primary school.

== Military service ==
Molyneaux served in the Royal Air Force between 1941 and 1946, including most of the Second World War. He took part in the liberation of the Bergen-Belsen concentration camp and occasionally gave interviews about what he saw there. On 1 April 1947, he was promoted to flying officer.

== Political career ==
From 1964 until the 1970s, Molyneaux served on Antrim County Council. At the 1970 general election he was elected to the House of Commons as UUP Member of Parliament (MP) for South Antrim, succeeding Sir Knox Cunningham, with whom he had worked closely as honorary secretary of the South Antrim Unionist Association.

South Antrim had one of the largest electorates of any parliamentary constituency, and it consistently returned Unionist MPs with large majorities. Cunningham's 1959 majority of 50,041 was the largest in the United Kingdom, achieved with 95.1% of the votes. Molyneaux won over 60% of the votes in each of the four elections he contested in South Antrim, and at the 1979 general election his 69.0% share of the votes gave him a majority of 38,868 votes, the largest in the United Kingdom.

Molyneaux's maiden speech, made on 15 February 1971, focused on the security situation in Northern Ireland at that time, and concluded: "The vast majority of people in Northern Ireland are keen to make their contribution to the greater unit of the United Kingdom, just as we, their representatives in this House, try to play our part. Collectively, Ulstermen and women will do what is asked of them, as they have done in the past, both in peace and in war."

In October 1974, Molyneaux became leader of the Ulster Unionists in the House of Commons. From 1982 to 1986, he sat as a UUP member for South Antrim in the Northern Ireland Assembly which was unable to deliver devolution at that time. Molyneaux was admitted to the Privy Council in 1982, and in October that year he survived two Irish National Liberation Army (INLA) assassination attempts.

With then UUP leader Harry West, Molyneaux had played a significant role in negotiations with James Callaghan's minority Labour government which led to Northern Ireland's representation in the Commons being increased from 12 to 17 seats, under the House of Commons (Redistribution of Seats) Act 1979. The extra seats were added for the 1983 general election, when the resulting boundary changes divided South Antrim, and Molyneaux was elected for the new seat of Lagan Valley.

=== UUP leadership ===
Harry West had lost his Westminster seat in the October 1974 general election, and did not stand in the subsequent general election in May 1979. Then in the European Parliament election held in June of that year, West stood in the new three-seat Northern Ireland constituency. He was not only out-polled by almost three-to-one by the Democratic Unionist Party (DUP) leader Ian Paisley but was beaten to the third seat by his own party colleague John Taylor. West resigned the leadership shortly after his defeat, and was succeeded by Molyneaux.

Following a decade of turmoil in which the UUP had four leaders and many splits, Molyneaux was seen as a steadying influence. He was a traditional right-wing Orangeman with a quiet style which contrasted with the flamboyance of Ian Paisley's leadership of the DUP. His reticence was both innate and tactical; as his party was united around a constitutional stance rather than a socio-economic programme, he regarded his task as more like that of a manager than a leader, and his successor David Trimble said that Molyneaux "did things quietly and consensually". He was so deeply loyal to the Conservative-turned-Ulster Unionist MP Enoch Powell that Northern Ireland Secretary Jim Prior said that Powell worked James Molyneaux with his foot. In his memoirs, Prior wrote that "at Westminster he was Enoch's puppet" while Molyneaux had called Prior "pig-headed and stupid" in 1983, unsuccessfully demanding Prior's replacement.

Molyneaux was generally regarded as a member of the integrationist wing within the UUP (favouring direct rule from Westminster with some extension of local government powers, as opposed to the devolutionist preference for a revived Northern Ireland Parliament or a new regional Assembly). This preference was widely attributed to the influence of Enoch Powell. Critics within Molyneaux's party saw Molyneaux as a do-nothing leader, with undue deference to the Conservative Party. Molyneaux's defenders argue that his primary concern was party unity, and that the UUP was so divided that only a minimalist policy could hold it together. His ability to accommodate the various factions of unionism was enhanced by his leadership of the Royal Black Institution and his senior role in the Orange Order. Under his leadership, there was no repetition of the splits of 1970s, and the slide in the party's vote share was halted. He was, however, the last UUP leader to avoid those perils.

During the 1980s, Molyneaux was an active member of the Conservative Monday Club. Molyneaux was co-opted onto the club's Executive Council on 23 June 1983. and later became a vice-president of the club. In the October 1985 Conservative Party Conference issue of the club's tabloid newspaper, Right Ahead, just before the signing of the Anglo-Irish Agreement, he contributed a lengthy article entitled 'Northern Ireland – Ulster belongs to Britain NOT to the Irish Republic'. Molyneaux was present at an Executive Council meeting in December 1990 which accepted a decision to stop employing salaried staff at the Club because of its financial deficit. He subsequently left the Monday Club in February 1991.

In March 2016, gay Conservative Party activist Christopher Luke claimed that he had had a long-term platonic David and Jonathan relationship with Molyneaux until the latter's death. Luke had claimed to have met Molyneaux at a Monday Club event in 1984. However, Molyneaux's relatives and former colleagues questioned the truthfulness of Luke's claims, which were not verified by others. Luke died at the age of 50 in December 2017.

Former member of Belfast City Council Jeff Dudgeon, who is openly gay, stated that Molyneaux had "some sort of homosexual sensibilities".

According to the book Angels with Blue Faces, by the journalist Lyra McKee, Molyneaux was interviewed by a senior RUC detective in relation to the Kincora Boys' Home abuse scandal but not arrested or charged, although McKee alleged that he and others were involved in a conspiracy relating to the case:

“Various names were bandied about or alluded to by the tabloid press [after the Kincora scandal erupted], so many that a senior detective investigating the home collected press clippings and followed them up. This led him to interview [the] then UUP party leader James Molyneaux. Molyneaux had protested his innocence and said he’d never been near the home. A closeted gay, his sexuality was an open secret among political circles, but homosexuality would remain illegal in Northern Ireland until 1987. The detective believed his protest and that press stories linking him to the home were inaccurate. Yet Molyneaux had not disclosed his links to [William] McGrath [the Housefather of Kincora], that he’d known the political preacher and of TARA [the paramilitary organisation commanded by McGrath] and had actually visited McGrath’s home. The police investigation was concerned primarily with the abuse allegations and so the political web linking the likes of McGrath and Molyneaux and other figures within unionism were never examined. Except by journalists”.

Politically, under Molyneaux's leadership, the UUP gained the newly created seats of East Antrim, Lagan Valley, Londonderry East, Newry and Armagh, Strangford, and Upper Bann in the 1983 general election, as well as gaining North Belfast (from the DUP) and Fermanagh and South Tyrone (from Sinn Féin). It also held South Belfast and his former constituency of South Antrim throughout his time as party leader; the more conservative DUP did not increase its number of (three) MPs over that time and by 1992, several unionist majorities were secured by electoral pacts between the two parties.

The party lost Newry and Armagh in 1986 and South Down in 1987 but maintained its nine MPs in the 1992 general election, including future leader David Trimble following his success in the 1990 Upper Bann by-election. Two life peers representing the party were also appointed in the early 1990s - Lord Cooke and Lord McConnell. The UUP was the largest party in the 1982-1986 Northern Ireland Assembly and increased its number of councillors in each local government election between 1981 and 1993.

Former Sunday Times journalist Chris Ryder reflected that Molyneaux was "at heart a shire Conservative" and an "intensely private and discreet man". Molyneaux had led an UUP delegation to hold talks with the Irish Government in Dublin in 1992, a significant development at that time, and his support for the Downing Street Declaration by John Major and Albert Reynolds in 1993 was "crucial, for it helped calm deep unionist fears".

=== Anglo-Irish Agreement ===
Molyneaux's loyalty to the Conservatives led to him being taken by surprise by the November 1985 Anglo-Irish Agreement, and overshadowed by Ian Paisley.

On 17 December 1985, Molyneaux resigned his seat, along with his fourteen unionist colleagues in the House of Commons, in protest at the Anglo-Irish Agreement. The fifteen Unionist MPs hoped that the by-elections could be portrayed as referendum on the agreement. He was re-elected in the resulting January 1986 by-election, along with all but one of the fourteen other unionists: the UUP's Jim Nicholson, who was defeated in Newry and Armagh by Seamus Mallon of the SDLP.

He felt most at home in Westminster, and believed that behind-the-scenes influence in London was the most effective path for unionist influence. He opposed formal power-sharing between unionists and nationalists, and routinely dismissed political initiatives, criticising SDLP leader John Hume for “grubbing around the back-streets of Belfast" to open dialogue with Sinn Féin while the IRA's violent campaign continued.

=== Peace process ===
In August 1994, the Provisional IRA called a ceasefire, which Molyneaux described as "the most destabilising event since partition" and "the worst thing that has ever happened to us".

In March 1995, Molyneaux was challenged for the leadership of the UUP by a 21-year-old student and, although he won easily, the election saw a strong protest vote against Molyneaux's leadership registered. Following the UUP's poor showing in the 1995 North Down by-election, Molyneaux yielded to renewed pressure to retire as leader in September of that year; he had also just turned 75 years of age. After retiring as UUP leader, Molyneaux was knighted as a Knight Commander of the Order of the British Empire (KBE) in 1996. After standing down as an MP at the 1997 general election, Molyneaux was created a life peer on 10 June 1997 as Baron Molyneaux of Killead, of Killead in the County of Antrim.

When a Roman Catholic church near his home was burnt down by loyalist arsonists in the late 1990s, Molyneaux helped raise funds to rebuild it.

His last speech as a Member of Parliament, on 19 March 1997, recognised the Callaghan Government's role in "granting Northern Ireland free and equal representation in the Parliament of the United Kingdom."

=== Retirement ===
Molyneaux's maiden speech in the House of Lords, on 3 July 1997, was critical of the peace process and noted "the necessity calmly to consider the impact of current events on the long-term interests of Ulster and to give absolute priority to draining the lake of bitterness in which the terrorists have been permitted to swim for far too long."

On several occasions in his retirement, Molyneaux was publicly critical of his successor, David Trimble. He fiercely opposed the Good Friday Agreement, and in 2003 supported three Ulster Unionist MPs (David Burnside, Jeffrey Donaldson and Martin Smyth) when they resigned the party whip in protest against Trimble's leadership and the party's support for the Agreement.

In the 2005 general election, Molyneaux caused controversy within unionism when he and Smyth endorsed the Democratic Unionist Party candidate Jimmy Spratt over the UUP candidate Michael McGimpsey in Smyth's former constituency of South Belfast. Molyneaux also endorsed Donaldson, his own successor as MP for Lagan Valley, even after Donaldson had defected to the DUP, as well as anti-Trimble UUP candidates such as Burnside. In the election, Donaldson held Lagan Valley by a large majority, while Spratt outpolled McGimpsey (although losing to the SDLP candidate Alasdair McDonnell on a split vote); many claimed that Molyneaux and Smyth's endorsements had contributed to the UUP's disastrous showing. However, Burnside lost his seat.

Molyneaux made his last speech to the House of Lords in February 2006, expressing concern for families affected by poor service from the Child Support Agency. He continued to regularly vote in the House of Lords until his last vote on the Counter-Terrorism Act 2008 in October 2008.

== Death ==
Molyneaux died at the age of 94 in Antrim, Northern Ireland, on 9 March 2015, Commonwealth Day.

Tributes were formally paid in the Northern Ireland Assembly and led by then UUP party leader, Mike Nesbitt, who remarked: "The sight of Lord Molyneaux as Ulster Unionist leader wearing his medals as he laid the wreath on behalf of the party at the Cenotaph every Remembrance Sunday in London was a powerful image that epitomised the ideals of dignity and service, which he embodied."

== Arms ==
Coat of arms of James Molyneaux, Baron Molyneaux of Killead

Crest
A wolf statant Or holding in the dexter forepaw a flax flower Azure slipped and leaved Or.
Escutcheon
Gyronny of eight Or and Azure a cross moline between four alder leaves slipped inwards all counterchanged.
Supporters
On either side a heraldic tyger reguardant Argent gorged with a plain collar attached thereto a chain reflexed over the back Or.
Motto
In Hoc Signo Vinces

== See also ==
- List of Northern Ireland members of the House of Lords
- List of Northern Ireland members of the Privy Council of the United Kingdom

== Sources ==
- Walker, Brian M., ed. (1992). Parliamentary election results in Ireland, 1918–92. Dublin: Royal Irish Academy. ISBN 0-901714-96-8. ISSN 0332-0286.

Parliament of the United Kingdom
Preceded by Sir Knox Cunningham	MP for South Antrim; 1970–1983	Succeeded by Clifford Forsythe
New constituency	MP for Lagan Valley; 1983–1997	Succeeded by Jeffrey Donaldson
Northern Ireland Assembly (1982)
New assembly	MPA for South Antrim; 1982–1986	Assembly abolished
Political offices
Preceded by Harry West	Leader of the Ulster Unionist Party; 1979–1995	Succeeded by David Trimble
Non-profit organization positions
Preceded by Sir Norman Stronge	Sovereign Grand Master of the Royal Black Preceptory; 1971–1998	Succeeded by William Logan
