= 1986 Belfast South by-election =

UK Parliamentary by-election

← 1983	23 January 1986	1987 →

Constituency of Belfast South
- Turnout: 56.9% (▼12.7%)
	First party	Second party
Candidate	Martin Smyth	David Cook
Party	UUP	Alliance
Popular vote	21,771	7,635
Percentage	71.3%	25.0%
Swing	▲21.3%	▲1.1%
MP before election
Martin Smyth
UUP
Subsequent MP
Martin Smyth
UUP

The 1986 Belfast South by-election was one of the fifteen 1986 Northern Ireland by-elections held on 23 January 1986, to fill vacancies in the Parliament of the United Kingdom caused by the resignation in December 1985 of all sitting Unionist Members of Parliament (MPs). The MPs, from the Ulster Unionist Party, Democratic Unionist Party and Ulster Popular Unionist Party, did this to highlight their opposition to the Anglo-Irish Agreement. Each of their parties agreed not to contest seats previously held by the others, and each outgoing MP stood for re-election.

1986 Belfast South by-election
Party	Candidate	Votes	%	±%
UUP	Martin Smyth	21,771	71.3	+21.3
Alliance	David Cook	7,635	25.0	+1.1
Workers' Party	Gerry Carr	1,109	3.6	+1.3
Majority		14,136	46.3	+20.3
Turnout		30,515	56.9	−12.7
Registered electors		53,944		
UUP hold		Swing		

== Other References ==
- A Vision Of Britain Through Time
- British Parliamentary By Elections: Campaign literature from the by-elections
- CAIN: Westminster By-Elections (NI) - Thursday 23 January 1986
- Northern Ireland Elections: Westminster by-elections 1986
