= 1986 Strangford by-election =

UK Parliamentary by-election

← 1983	23 Jan 1986	1987 →

Constituency of Strangford
- Turnout: 55.0% (▼9.9%)
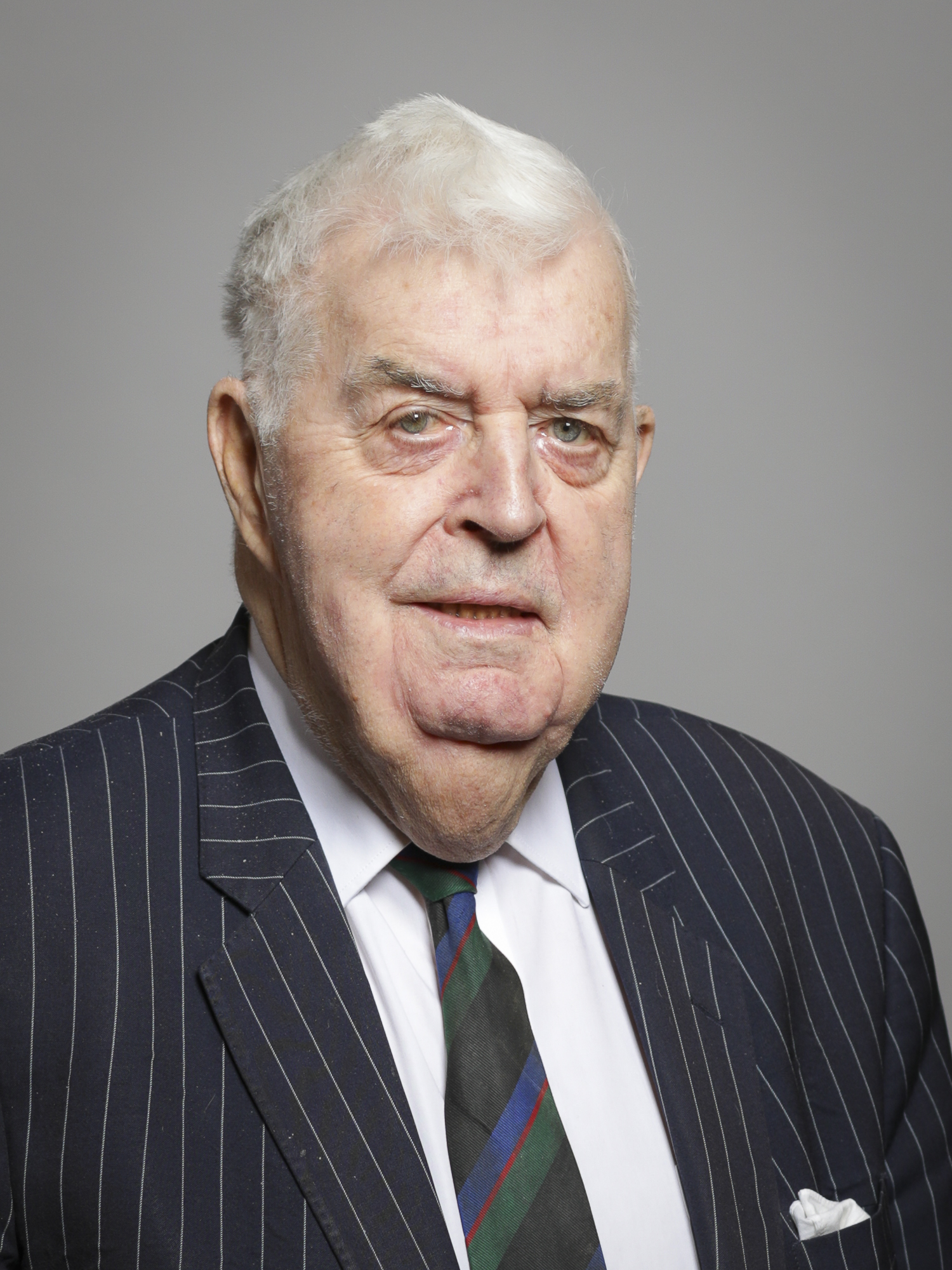
	First party	Second party
		FTAIA
Candidate	John David Taylor	"Peter Barry"
Party	UUP	"For the Anglo-Irish Agreement"
Popular vote	32,627	1,993
Percentage	94.2%	5.8%
Swing	▲45.4%	New
MP before election
John David Taylor
UUP
Subsequent MP
John David Taylor
UUP

The 1986 Strangford by-election was one of the fifteen 1986 Northern Ireland by-elections held on 23 January 1986, to fill vacancies in the Parliament of the United Kingdom caused by the resignation in December 1985 of all sitting Unionist Members of Parliament (MPs). The MPs, from the Ulster Unionist Party, Democratic Unionist Party and Ulster Popular Unionist Party, did this to highlight their opposition to the Anglo-Irish Agreement. Each of their parties agreed not to contest seats previously held by the others, and each outgoing MP stood for re-election.

1986 Strangford by-election
Party	Candidate	Votes	%	±%
UUP	John David Taylor	32,627	94.2	+45.4
"For the Anglo-Irish Agreement"	"Peter Barry" (Wesley Robert Williamson)	1,993	5.8	N/A
Majority		30,634	88.4	+69.6
Turnout		34,620	55.0	−9.9
Registered electors		62,854		
UUP hold		Swing		
