= 1986 North Antrim by-election =

UK Parliamentary by-election

← 1983	23 Jan 1986	1987 →

Constituency of North Antrim
- Turnout: 53.5% (▼16.3%)
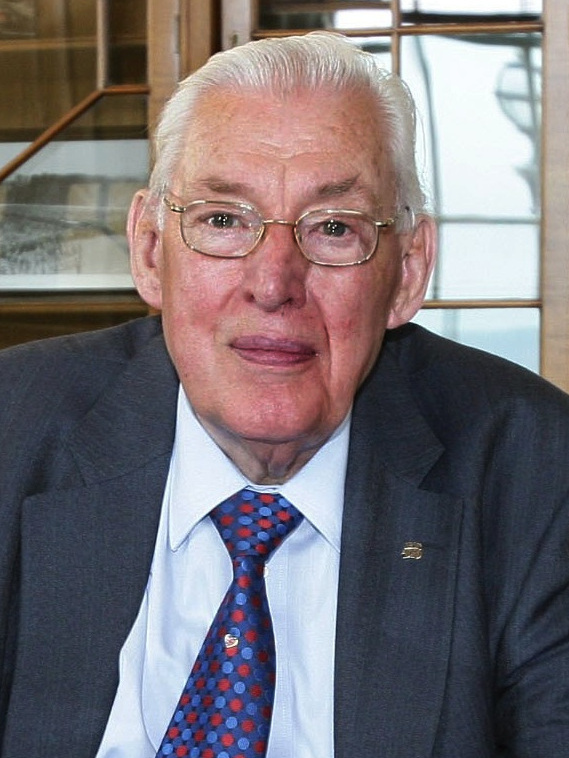
	First party
Candidate	Ian Paisley
Party	DUP
Popular vote	33,937
Percentage	97.4%
Swing	▲43.2%
MP before election
Ian Paisley
DUP
Subsequent MP
Ian Paisley
DUP

The 1986 North Antrim by-election was one of the fifteen 1986 Northern Ireland by-elections held on 23 January 1986, to fill vacancies in the Parliament of the United Kingdom caused by the resignation in December 1985 of all sitting Unionist Members of Parliament (MPs). The MPs, from the Ulster Unionist Party, Democratic Unionist Party and Ulster Popular Unionist Party, did this to highlight their opposition to the Anglo-Irish Agreement. Each of their parties agreed not to contest seats previously held by the others, and each outgoing MP stood for re-election.

All but one of the Unionists were re-elected, many with extremely large majorities. The largest of all went to Ian Paisley in North Antrim. He won 97.4% of the vote, the highest percentage polled by any candidate in a UK by-election since the 1940 Middleton and Prestwich by-election.

1986 North Antrim by-election
Party	Candidate	Votes	%	±%
DUP	Ian Paisley	33,937	97.4	+43.2
"For the Anglo-Irish Agreement"	"Peter Barry" (Wesley Williamson)	515	2.6	N/A
Majority		33,024	94.8	+65.0
Turnout		34,452	53.5	−16.3
Registered electors		65,157		
DUP hold		Swing		

== Other References ==
- British Parliamentary By Elections: Campaign literature from the by-elections
- CAIN: Westminster By-Elections (NI) - Thursday 23 January 1986
- Northern Ireland Elections: Westminster by-elections 1986
