= 1986 Mid Ulster by-election =

UK Parliamentary by-election

← 1983	23 January 1986	1987 →

Constituency of Mid Ulster
- Turnout: 77.6% (▼6.7%)
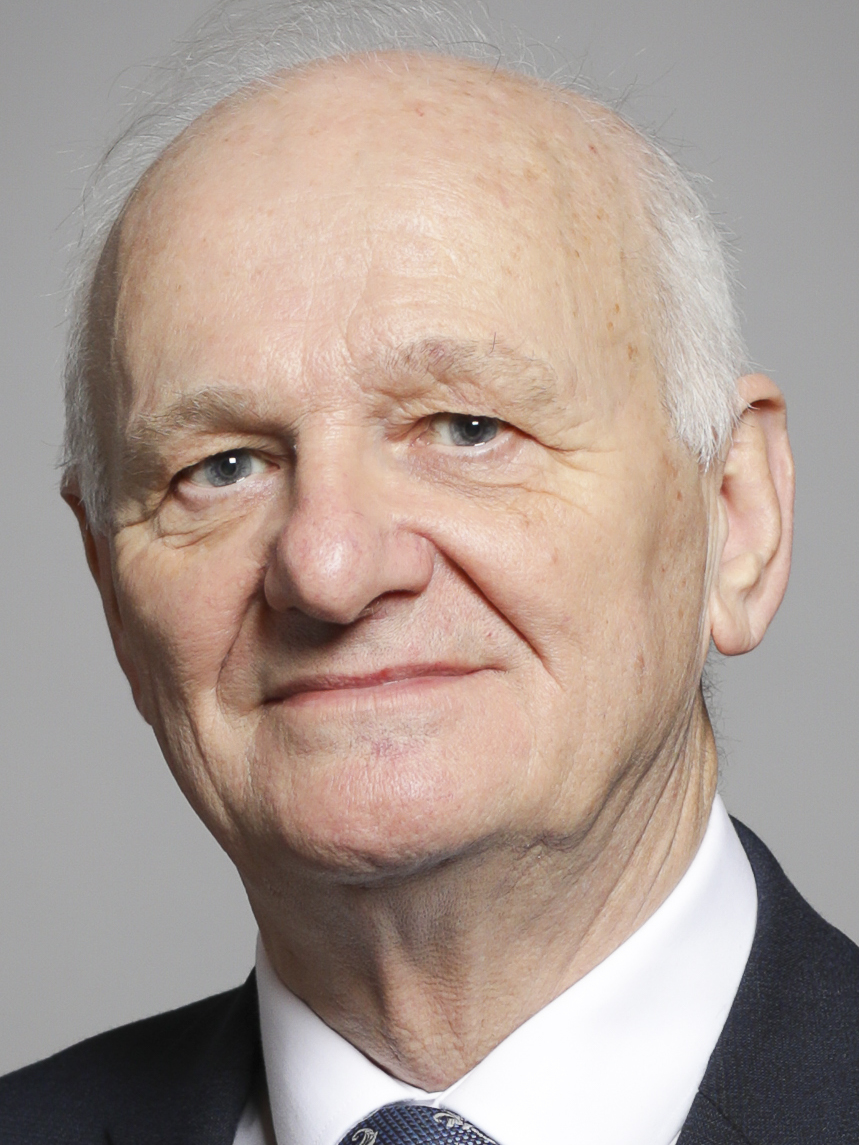

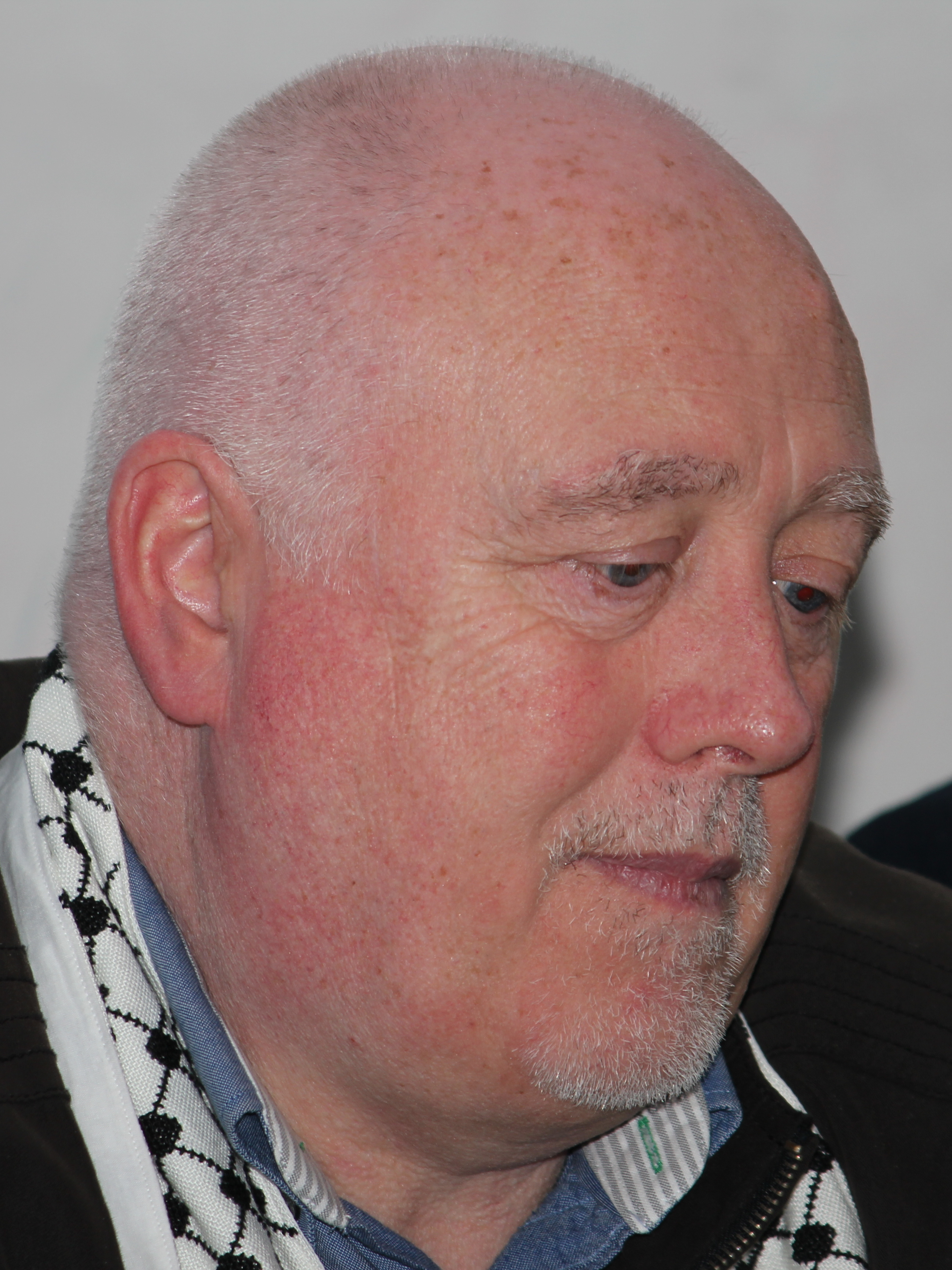
	First party	Second party	Third party
			SDLP
Candidate	William McCrea	Danny Morrison	Adrian Colton
Party	DUP	Sinn Féin	SDLP
Popular vote	23,695	13,998	13,021
Percentage	46.4%	27.1%	25.2%
Swing	▲16.4%	▼2.8%	▲2.8%
MP before election
William McCrea
DUP
Elected MP
William McCrea
DUP

The 1986 Mid Ulster by-election was one of the fifteen 1986 Northern Ireland by-elections held on 23 January 1986, to fill vacancies in the Parliament of the United Kingdom caused by the resignation in December 1985 of all sitting Unionist Members of Parliament (MPs). The MPs, from the Ulster Unionist Party, Democratic Unionist Party and Ulster Popular Unionist Party, did this to highlight their opposition to the Anglo-Irish Agreement. Each of their parties agreed not to contest seats previously held by the others, and each outgoing MP stood for re-election.

The Unionist candidate was able to survive with less than 50% of the vote due to a split Nationalist vote and the seat was gained by Sinn Féin in later elections once Unionist pacts had broken down.

1986 Mid Ulster by-election
Party	Candidate	Votes	%	±%
DUP	William McCrea	23,695	46.4	+16.4
Sinn Féin	Danny Morrison	13,998	27.1	−2.8
SDLP	Adrian Colton	13,021	25.2	+2.8
Workers' Party	Tommy Owens	691	1.4	0.0
Majority		9,697	19.3	+19.2
Turnout		51,405	77.6	−6.7
Registered electors		66,757		
DUP hold		Swing		

== Other References ==
- British Parliamentary By Elections: Campaign literature from the by-elections
- CAIN: Westminster By-Elections (NI) - Thursday 23 January 1986
- Northern Ireland Elections: Westminster by-elections 1986
- A Vision Of Britain Through Time (Constituency elector numbers)
