= 1986 Belfast East by-election =

UK Parliamentary by-election

← 1983	23 January 1986	1987 →

Constituency of Belfast East
- Turnout: 61.7% (▼8.3%)
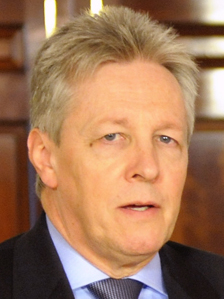
	First party	Second party
		APNI
Candidate	Peter Robinson	Oliver Napier
Party	DUP	Alliance
Popular vote	27,607	5,917
Percentage	81.0%	17.4%
Swing	▲35.7%	▼6.7%
MP before election
Peter Robinson
DUP
Subsequent MP
Peter Robinson
DUP

The 1986 Belfast East by-election was one of the fifteen 1986 Northern Ireland by-elections held on 23 January 1986, to fill vacancies in the Parliament of the United Kingdom caused by the resignation in December 1985 of all sitting Unionist Members of Parliament (MPs). The MPs, from the Ulster Unionist Party, Democratic Unionist Party and Ulster Popular Unionist Party, did this to highlight their opposition to the Anglo-Irish Agreement. Each of their parties agreed not to contest seats previously held by the others, and each outgoing MP stood for re-election.

1986 Belfast East by-election
Party	Candidate	Votes	%	±%
DUP	Peter Robinson	27,607	81.0	+35.7
Alliance	Oliver Napier	5,917	17.4	−6.7
Workers' Party	Frances Joseph Cullen	578	1.7	+0.6
Majority		21,690	63.6	+43.1
Turnout		34,102	61.7	−8.3
Registered electors		55,256		
DUP hold		Swing		

== Other References ==
- British Parliamentary By Elections: Campaign literature from the by-elections
- CAIN: Westminster By-Elections (NI) - Thursday 23 January 1986
- Northern Ireland Elections: Westminster by-elections 1986
