= Strangford (UK Parliament constituency) =

UK Parliament constituency (since 1983)

Coordinates: 54.484°N 5.618°W

- County constituency for the House of Commons
- Strangford as of 2024
- District: Ards and North Down; Newry, Mourne and Down
- Major settlements: Newtownards; Comber

Current constituency
- Created: 1983
- Member of Parliament: Jim Shannon (DUP)
- Created from: North Down; Belfast South; Belfast East

Strangford is a parliamentary constituency in the House of Commons of the United Kingdom.

The constituency's current MP is Jim Shannon of the Democratic Unionist Party (DUP), who has served since the 2010 election.

== Constituency profile ==
Strangford covers the settlements either side of Strangford Lough.

The constituency has been represented by Unionist candidates since it was formed. There have not been significant votes for parties outside the traditional unionist block, although the Alliance has saved its deposit in every election.

The main interest in elections has been the contest between the Ulster Unionist Party (UUP) and the Democratic Unionist Party (DUP). Until the 2001 general election, the UUP were clearly ahead of the DUP in Westminster elections, but elections to regional assemblies and local government were much closer. In 2001 the sitting MP John Taylor retired and the contest to succeed him was fierce. The seat was won by Iris Robinson for the Democratic Unionist Party (DUP) and the subsequent 2003 assembly election saw the DUP increase their vote further.

The seat is strongly unionist, and one of 7 areas of Northern Ireland which voted to leave the European Union.

== Boundaries ==
The seat was created after boundary changes in 1983, as part of an expansion of Northern Ireland's constituencies from 12 to 17, and was predominantly made up from parts of North Down.

In 1995, the Commission recommended abolishing the constituency and dividing it between North Down and new constituencies of Mid Down, and Castlereagh and Newtownards. This was successfully opposed in local enquiries.

From 2024, for the first time, the town of Strangford is included in the constituency having previously being in South Down.

1983–1997	The district of Ards; and in the district of Castlereagh, the wards of Beechill, Fourwinds, Hillfoot, Lower Braniel, Minnowburn, Moneyreagh, Newtownbreda, and Upper Braniel.
1997–2010	In the district of Ards, the wards of Ballygowan, Ballyrainey, Ballywalter, Bradshaw's Brae, Carrowdore, Central, Comber East, Comber North, Comber West, Glen, Gregstown, Killinchy, Kircubbin, Lisbane, Loughries, Movilla, Portaferry, Portavogie, Scrabo, and Whitespots; in the district of Castlereagh, the wards of Ballyhanwood, Carrowreagh, Carryduff East, Carryduff West, Dundonald, Enler, Graham's Bridge and Moneyreagh; and in the district of Down, the wards of Derryboy, Killyleagh, and Saintfield.
2010–2024	In the district of Ards, the wards of Ballygowan, Ballyrainey, Ballywalter, Bradshaw's Brae, Carrowdore, Central, Comber East, Comber North, Comber West, Glen, Gregstown, Killinchy, Kircubbin, Lisbane, Loughries, Movilla, Portaferry, Portavogie, Scrabo, and Whitespots; in the district of Castlereagh, the ward of Moneyreagh; and in the district of Down, the wards of Ballymaglave, Ballynahinch East, Derryboy, Killyleagh, Kilmore, and Saintfield.
2024–	In Ards and North Down, the wards of Ballygowan, Ballywalter, the part of the Carrowdore ward to the south of the southern boundary of the 2010–2024 North Down constituency, Comber North, Comber South, Comber West, Conway Square, Cronstown, Glen, Gregstown, Killinchy, Kircubbin, the part of the Loughries ward to the west of the southern boundary of the 2010–2024 North Down constituency, Movilla, Portaferry, Portavogie, Scrabo, and West Winds; and in Newry, Mourne and Down, the wards of Ballynahinch, the part of the Ballyward ward to the north of the Ballyward split line, Crossgar and Killyleagh, Derryboy, Drumaness, Kilmore, the part of the Quoile ward to the north of the Quoile split line, the Strangford ward, except for the relevant area.

== Members of Parliament ==
Election	Member	Party
1983	John Taylor	UUP
1986 b	John Taylor	UUP
1987	John Taylor	UUP
1992	John Taylor	UUP
1997	John Taylor	UUP
2001	Iris Robinson^{*}	DUP
2005	Iris Robinson^{*}	DUP
2010	Vacant	
2010	Jim Shannon	DUP
2015	Jim Shannon	DUP
2017	Jim Shannon	DUP
2019	Jim Shannon	DUP
2024	Jim Shannon	DUP

^{*} Iris Robinson left the DUP shortly before taking the Chiltern Hundreds to leave the Commons. The seat was vacant from 13 January 2010 until the general election on 6 May 2010. Robinson resigned in January 2010 after a scandal involving financial dealings. However, no by-election was held, as the next general election was held in May 2010.

== Election results ==
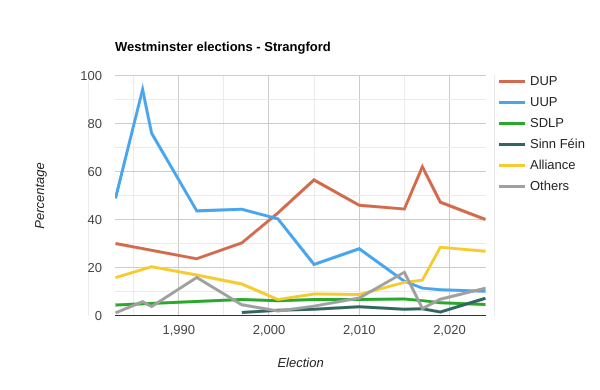
Strangford Westminster election results 1983–2024

=== Elections in the 2020s ===
2024 general election: Strangford
Party	Candidate	Votes	%	±%
DUP	Jim Shannon	15,559	40.0	−0.5
Alliance	Michelle Guy	10,428	26.8	+0.6
UUP	Richard Smart	3,941	10.1	+0.9
TUV	Ron McDowell	3,143	8.1	New
Sinn Féin	Noel Sands	2,793	7.2	−0.4
SDLP	Will Polland	1,783	4.6	−5.5
Green (NI)	Alexandra Braidner	703	1.8	0.0
Independent	Garreth Falls	256	0.7	New
Independent	Gareth Burns	157	0.4	New
NI Conservatives	Barry Hetherington	146	0.4	−3.0
Majority		5,131	13.2	−1.1
Turnout		38,909	52.2	−4.6
Registered electors		74,525		
DUP hold		Swing	−0.55	

=== Elections in the 2010s ===
2019 general election: Strangford
Party	Candidate	Votes	%	±%
DUP	Jim Shannon	17,705	47.2	−14.8
Alliance	Kellie Armstrong	10,634	28.4	+13.7
UUP	Phillip Smith	4,023	10.7	−0.7
SDLP	Joe Boyle	1,994	5.3	−0.9
NI Conservatives	Grant Abraham	1,476	3.9	+2.6
Green (NI)	Maurice Macartney	790	2.1	+0.5
Sinn Féin	Ryan Carlin	555	1.5	−1.3
UKIP	Robert Stephenson	308	0.8	New
Majority		7,071	18.8	−28.5
Turnout		37,485	56.0	−4.4
Registered electors		66,938		
DUP hold		Swing	−14.3	

2017 general election: Strangford
Party	Candidate	Votes	%	±%
DUP	Jim Shannon	24,036	62.0	+17.6
Alliance	Kellie Armstrong	5,693	14.7	+0.9
UUP	Mike Nesbitt	4,419	11.4	−2.9
SDLP	Joe Boyle	2,404	6.2	−0.7
Sinn Féin	Carole Murphy	1,083	2.8	+0.2
Green (NI)	Ricky Bamford	607	1.6	New
NI Conservatives	Claire Hiscott	507	1.3	−5.1
Majority		18,343	47.3	+17.2
Turnout		38,749	60.4	+7.6
Registered electors		64,327		
DUP hold		Swing	+8.4	

2015 general election: Strangford
Party	Candidate	Votes	%	±%
DUP	Jim Shannon	15,053	44.4	−1.5
UUP	Robert Burgess	4,868	14.3	−13.5
Alliance	Kellie Armstrong	4,687	13.8	+5.1
SDLP	Joe Boyle	2,335	6.9	+0.2
UKIP	Joe Jordan	2,237	6.6	New
NI Conservatives	Johnny Andrews	2,167	6.4	New
TUV	Stephen Cooper	1,701	5.0	−0.6
Sinn Féin	Sheila Bailie	876	2.6	−1.0
Majority		10,185	30.1	+12.0
Turnout		33,924	52.8	−0.9
Registered electors		64,289		
DUP hold		Swing	+6.0	

2010 general election: Strangford
Party	Candidate	Votes	%	±%
DUP	Jim Shannon	14,926	45.9	−8.8
UCU-NF	Mike Nesbitt	9,050	27.8	+2.6
Alliance	Deborah Girvan	2,828	8.7	+0.5
SDLP	Claire Hanna	2,164	6.7	±0.0
TUV	Terry Williams	1,814	5.6	New
Sinn Féin	Michael Coogan	1,161	3.6	−0.1
Green (NI)	Barbara Haig	562	1.7	New
Majority		5,876	18.1	−17.4
Turnout		32.505	53.7	−3.4
Registered electors		60,539		
DUP hold		Swing	−7.6	

=== Elections in the 2000s ===
2005 general election: Strangford
Party	Candidate	Votes	%	±%
DUP	Iris Robinson	20,921	56.5	+13.7
UUP	Gareth McGimpsey	7,872	21.3	−19.0
Alliance	Kieran McCarthy	3,332	9.0	+2.3
SDLP	Joe Boyle	2,496	6.7	+0.6
NI Conservatives	Terry Dick	1,462	3.9	New
Sinn Féin	Dermot Kennedy	949	2.6	+0.4
Majority		13,049	35.2	+32.7
Turnout		37,032	53.6	−6.3
Registered electors		68,570		
DUP hold		Swing	+16.4	

2001 general election: Strangford
Party	Candidate	Votes	%	±%
DUP	Iris Robinson	18,532	42.8	+12.6
UUP	David McNarry	17,422	40.3	−4.0
Alliance	Kieran McCarthy	2,902	6.7	−6.4
SDLP	Danny McCarthy	2,646	6.1	−0.6
Sinn Féin	Liam Johnston	930	2.2	+1.0
NI Unionist	Cedric Wilson	822	1.9	New
Majority		1,110	2.5	
Turnout		43,254	59.9	+0.4
Registered electors		72,192		
DUP gain from UUP		Swing	−8.3	

=== Elections in the 1990s ===
1997 general election: Strangford
Party	Candidate	Votes	%	±%
UUP	John Taylor	18,431	44.3	−4.7
DUP	Iris Robinson	12,579	30.2	+10.3
Alliance	Kieran McCarthy	5,467	13.1	−3.0
SDLP	Peter O'Reilly	2,775	6.7	New
NI Conservatives	Gilbert Chalk	1,743	4.2	−10.0
Sinn Féin	Garret O'Fachtna	503	1.2	New
Natural Law	Sarah Mullins	121	0.3	−0.4
Majority		5,852	14.1	−15.0
Turnout		41,619	59.5	−5.5
Registered electors		70,073		
UUP hold		Swing	−7.6	

Notional 1992 Election Result: Strangford
Party	Candidate	Votes	%	±%
UUP	N/A	20,473	49.0	N/A
DUP	N/A	8,295	19.9	N/A
Alliance	N/A	6,736	16.1	N/A
NI Conservatives	N/A	5,945	14.2	N/A
Others	N/A	295	0.7	N/A
Majority		12,178	29.1	N/A

1992 general election: Strangford
Party	Candidate	Votes	%	±%
UUP	John Taylor	19,517	43.6	−32.3
DUP	Sammy Wilson	10,606	23.7	New
Alliance	Kieran McCarthy	7,585	16.9	−3.4
NI Conservatives	Stephen Eyre	6,782	15.1	New
Natural Law	David Shaw	295	0.7	New
Majority		8,911	19.9	−35.7
Turnout		44,785	65.0	+7.4
Registered electors		68,901		
UUP hold		Swing		

=== Elections in the 1980s ===
1987 general election: Strangford
Party	Candidate	Votes	%	±%
UUP	John Taylor	28,199	75.9	+27.1
Alliance	Addie Morrow	7,553	20.3	+4.5
Workers' Party	Imelda Elizabeth Hynds	1,385	3.7	New
Majority		20,646	55.6	+36.8
Turnout		37,137	57.6	−7.3
Registered electors		64,429		
UUP hold		Swing		

1986 Strangford by-election
Party	Candidate	Votes	%	±%
UUP	John Taylor	32,627	94.2	+45.4
"For the Anglo-Irish Agreement"	"Peter Barry" (Wesley Robert Williamson)	1,993	5.8	New
Majority		30,634	88.4	+69.6
Turnout		34,620	55.0	−9.9
Registered electors		62,854		
UUP hold		Swing		

1983 general election: Strangford
Party	Candidate	Votes	%	±%
UUP	John Taylor	19,086	48.8	
DUP	Simpson Gibson	11,716	30.0	
Alliance	Addie Morrow	6,171	15.8	
SDLP	James Curry	1,713	4.4	
Independent Labour	Samuel Raymond Heath	430	1.1	
Majority		7,370	18.8	
Turnout		39,116	64.9	
Registered electors		60,179		
UUP win (new seat)				

== See also ==
- List of parliamentary constituencies in Northern Ireland
- Strangford (Assembly constituency)
