= Opinion polling for the 1983 United Kingdom general election =

In the run-up to the 1983 general election, various organisations carried out opinion polling to gauge voting intention. Results of such polls are displayed in this article. The date ranges for these opinion polls are from the 1979 general election until 6 June 1983.

Graph of opinion polls conducted Conservative Labour SDP–Liberal Alliance

== Polling results ==
All data is from UK Polling Report.

=== 1983 ===
Survey end date	Pollster	Client	Con	Lab	All	Lead
9 June	1983 general election		42.4%	27.6%	25.4%	14.8%
8 Jun	Harris	The Observer	47%	26%	25%	21%
8 Jun	Gallup	The Daily Telegraph	47%	25%	26%	21%
8 Jun	Marplan	The Guardian	45.5%	26.5%	26%	19%
8 Jun	NOP	Northcliffe	46%	26%	26%	20%
8 Jun	MORI	Evening Standard	47%	25%	26%	21%
8 Jun	NOP	Daily Mail	44%	28%	26%	16%
7 Jun	Audience Selection	The Sun	46%	28%	24%	18%
7 Jun	Marplan	The Guardian	46%	23%	29%	17%
6 Jun	Audience Selection	The Sun	47%	26%	25%	21%
5 Jun	Harris	The Observer	45%	24%	28%	17%
3 Jun	Marplan	Sunday Mirror	47%	28%	23%	19%
3 Jun	NOP	The Mail on Sunday	44%	27%	27.5%	16.5%
3 Jun	Gallup	The Sunday Telegraph	47%	29%	23%	18%
2 Jun	MORI	The Sunday Times	45.5%	31.5%	22%	14%
2 Jun	MORI	Daily Express	45%	28%	25%	17%
2 Jun	Marplan	The Guardian	43%	32%	23%	11%
1 Jun	Harris	TV-Eye	47%	30%	22%	17%
1 Jun	MORI	Daily Star	46%	28%	24%	18%
31 May	Audience Selection	The Sun	44%	32%	21%	12%
31 May	Gallup	The Daily Telegraph	44%	29%	25%	15%
30 May	Audience Selection	TV-AM	47.5%	28%	23%	19.5%
30 May	Harris	The Observer	41%	30%	24%	11%
27 May	Marplan	Sunday Mirror	47%	30%	21%	17%
27 May	Gallup	The Daily Telegraph	49.5%	31%	19%	18.5%
26 May	MORI	Daily Express	49%	31.5%	18%	17.5%
26 May	Marplan	The Guardian	51%	29%	19%	22%
25 May	Harris	Thames	47.5%	32.5%	19%	15%
25 May	MORI	The Sunday Times	48%	33%	18%	15%
25 May	Audience Selection	The Sun	46%	30%	23%	16%
24 May	Gallup	The Daily Telegraph	45%	32%	21%	13%
23 May	Audience Selection	TV-AM	48%	33%	18%	15%
23 May	MORI	Daily Star	45%	32%	20%	13%
23 May	NOP	Daily Mail	51%	33%	15%	18%
23 May	Harris	The Observer	52%	33%	14%	19%
20 May	Marplan	Sunday Mirror	45%	36%	18%	9%
20 May	MORI	Daily Express	47%	34%	18%	13%
19 May	MORI	The Sunday Times	46%	37%	16%	9%
18 May	Harris	Thames	47%	30%	21%	17%
18 May	NOP	Daily Mail	45%	35%	17%	10%
17 May	Audience Selection	The Sun	49%	31%	19%	18%
17 May	Gallup	The Daily Telegraph	44%	33%	21%	11%
16 May	MORI	Daily Star	46%	33%	19%	13%
16 May	Audience Selection	TV-AM	44%	37%	17%	7%
16 May	MORI	Daily Express	46%	31%	21%	15%
13 May	The Dissolution of the 48th Parliament and campaigning officially begins					
12 May	MORI	N/A	49%	34%	15%	15%
11 May	Harris	Thames	46%	32%	22%	14%
11 May	MORI	Daily Star	52%	31%	17%	21%
10 May	Gallup	The Daily Telegraph	46%	31%	21%	15%
9 May	MORI	N/A	49%	31.5%	17.5%	17.5%
5 May	1983 local elections					
25 Apr	MORI	N/A	45%	30%	23%	15%
23 Apr	MORI	N/A	46%	33%	21%	13%
12 Apr	Gallup	The Daily Telegraph	43%	34%	22%	9%
11 Apr	MORI	N/A	40.5%	35%	22.5%	5.5%
24 Mar	Darlington by-election					
23 Mar	Gallup	The Daily Telegraph	43%	28%	28%	15%
21 Mar	MORI	N/A	39.5%	28.5%	29%	10.5%
16 Mar	MORI	N/A	42%	28%	27%	14%
9 Mar	MORI	N/A	41%	27%	30%	11%
26 Feb	MORI	N/A	39%	26%	34%	5%
24 Feb	Bermondsey by-election					
23 Feb	Gallup	The Daily Telegraph	46%	32%	21%	14%
14 Feb	MORI	N/A	43.5%	32.5%	22%	11%
9 Feb	MORI	N/A	45%	32%	21%	13%
26 Jan	Gallup	The Daily Telegraph	44%	36%	19%	8%
17 Jan	MORI	N/A	44%	31.5%	22.5%	12.5%
12 Jan	MORI	N/A	44%	35%	20%	9%

=== 1982 ===
Survey end date	Pollster	Client	Con	Lab	All	Lead
15 Dec	Gallup	The Daily Telegraph	42%	35%	21%	7%
13 Dec	MORI	N/A	41%	34.5%	22%	6.5%
2 Dec	Glasgow Queen's Park by-election					
24 Nov	Gallup	The Daily Telegraph	43%	35%	21%	8%
15 Nov	MORI	N/A	42%	34.5%	21.5%	7.5%
10 Nov	MORI	N/A	42%	33%	23%	9%
28 Oct	Birmingham Northfield and Peckham by-elections					
26 Oct	Gallup	The Daily Telegraph	43%	32%	23%	11%
25 Oct	MORI	N/A	40.5%	29%	27%	11.5%
20 Oct	1982 Northern Ireland Assembly election					
12 Oct	Gallup	The Daily Telegraph	42%	33%	23%	9%
16 Sep	Gower by-election					
13 Sep	MORI	N/A	44%	30.5%	23%	13.5%
31 Aug	Gallup	The Daily Telegraph	42%	30%	27%	12%
16 Aug	MORI	N/A	44.5%	26.5%	27.5%	17%
31 Jul	Gallup	The Daily Telegraph	44%	30%	23%	14%
12 Jul	MORI	N/A	46.5%	27.5%	24%	19%
2 Jul	Roy Jenkins is elected leader of the Social Democratic Party					
30 Jun	MORI	N/A	45%	31%	22%	14%
24 Jun	Coatbridge and Airdrie by-election					
23 Jun	Gallup	The Daily Telegraph	51%	24%	23%	27%
14 Jun	MORI	N/A	45%	25%	28.5%	16.5%
14 Jun	The Falklands War ends					
3 Jun	Mitcham and Morden by-election					
31 May	MORI	N/A	48%	28%	24%	20%
27 May	Beaconsfield by-election					
26 May	MORI	N/A	51%	25%	23%	26%
23 May	Gallup	The Daily Telegraph	48%	31%	20%	17%
16 May	MORI	N/A	41.5%	28%	29%	12.5%
16 May	MORI	N/A	48%	33%	17%	15%
6 May	1982 United Kingdom local elections					
5 May	MORI	N/A	38%	32%	28%	6%
30 Apr	MORI	N/A	44%	30%	24%	14%
30 Apr	MORI	N/A	43%	30%	25%	13%
24 Apr	MORI	N/A	39%	32%	27%	7%
21 Apr	MORI	N/A	36%	30%	31%	5%
14 Apr	Gallup	The Daily Telegraph	33%	34%	30%	1%
12 Apr	MORI	N/A	31.5%	29%	37%	5.5%
2 Apr	The Falklands War begins					
31 Mar	Gallup	The Daily Telegraph	35%	30%	33%	2%
25 Mar	Glasgow Hillhead by-election					
15 Mar	MORI	N/A	31.5%	33%	33%	Tie
4 Mar	Belfast South by-election					
28 Feb	Gallup	The Daily Telegraph	34%	34%	30%	Tie
15 Feb	NOP	Daily Mail	27.5%	34%	36%	2%
5 Feb	MORI	N/A	41%	36%	21%	5%
31 Jan	MORI	N/A	30%	33%	34%	1%
25 Jan	Gallup	The Daily Telegraph	29%	30%	40%	10%
18 Jan	Gallup	The Daily Telegraph	27.5%	29.5%	39.5%	10%

=== 1981 ===
Survey end date	Pollster	Client	Con	Lab	All	Lead
14 Dec	MORI	N/A	23%	23.5%	50.5%	27%
14 Dec	NOP	N/A	27%	29%	43%	14%
3 Dec	MORI	N/A	30.5%	34.3%	33.1%	1.2%
1 Dec	NOP	N/A	27%	27%	44%	17%
1 Dec	Gallup	The Daily Telegraph	28.6%	32.1%	37.1%	5%
26 Nov	Crosby by-election					
16 Nov	NOP	N/A	26.5%	29%	42%	13%
6 Nov	MORI	N/A	29.2%	38.2%	30.6%	7.6%
27 Oct	Gallup	The Daily Telegraph	27%	31%	40%	9%
26 Oct	NOP	N/A	29.5%	28%	40%	12%
22 Oct	Croydon North West by-election					
8 Oct	MORI	N/A	32.1%	40.4%	24.7%	8.3%
28 Sep	MORI	N/A	28%	42%	28%	14%
18 Sep	Gallup	The Daily Telegraph	27%	38%	33%	5%
14 Sep	NOP	N/A	32%	36.5%	29%	7.5%
11 Sep	Gallup	The Daily Telegraph	33.5%	37.4%	27.7%	3.9%
20 Aug	Fermanagh & South Tyrone second by-election					
17 Aug	NOP	N/A	28%	38.5%	32.5%	6%
7 Aug	MORI	N/A	31.6%	42.1%	24.3%	10.5%
31 Jul	Gallup	The Daily Telegraph	30%	39%	29%	9%
16 Jul	Warrington by-election					
13 Jul	NOP	N/A	30%	40.5%	26.5%	10.5%
9 Jul	MORI	N/A	31.5%	41.2%	24.2%	9.7%
30 Jun	MORI	N/A	30%	36%	31%	6%
22 Jun	MORI	N/A	31%	39%	28%	8%
16 Jun	Gallup	The Daily Telegraph	37%	39%	22%	2%
15 Jun	NOP	N/A	29.5%	37.5%	30.5%	8%
5 Jun	MORI	N/A	37.7%	39.3%	20.8%	1.6%
30 May	Gallup	The Daily Telegraph	35%	39%	24%	4%
11 May	MORI	N/A	32%	35.5%	29%	3.5%
11 May	NOP	N/A	38%	41%	19%	3%
7–20 May	1981 United Kingdom local elections					
7 May	MORI	N/A	30.9%	39.3%	26.6%	8.4%
27 Apr	Gallup	The Daily Telegraph	30%	38%	29%	8%
13 Apr	NOP	N/A	30%	34.5%	33%	4.5%
9 Apr	Fermanagh & South Tyrone by-election					
3 Apr	MORI	N/A	35.9%	42.1%	19.5%	6.2%
26 Mar	The Social Democratic Party is formed					
23 Mar	MORI	N/A	33%	41%	25%	8%
23 Mar	Gallup	The Daily Telegraph	28%	38%	32%	10%
16 Mar	NOP	N/A	30%	34%	32%	4%
2 Mar	NOP	N/A	37%	41.1%	16.5%	4.1%
13 Feb	Gallup	The Daily Telegraph	34.5%	50.9%	12.2%	16.4%
11 Feb	MORI	N/A	36%	35.5%	26.5%	0.5%
24 Jan	Gallup	The Daily Telegraph	35%	45%	17%	10%
19 Jan	NOP	N/A	33%	46.5%	18.5%	13.5%
9 Jan	MORI	N/A	35.4%	51.2%	11.9%	15.8%

=== 1980 ===
Survey end date	Pollster	Client	Con	Lab	Lib	Lead
19 Dec	Gallup	The Daily Telegraph	32%	56%	11%	24%
15 Dec	NOP	N/A	35%	47.5%	14.5%	12.5%
4 Dec	Gallup	The Daily Telegraph	37.2%	47.7%	12.6%	10.5%
17 Nov	MORI	N/A	36.5%	47%	15%	10.5%
11 Nov	NOP	N/A	38%	47%	13%	9%
10 Nov	Michael Foot becomes leader of the Labour Party					
7 Nov	MORI	N/A	39.4%	46.5%	12.4%	7.1%
31 Oct	Gallup	The Daily Telegraph	36%	50%	13%	14%
20 Oct	Gallup	The Daily Telegraph	40%	43%	13.5%	3%
6 Oct	NOP	N/A	40%	43%	13.5%	3%
2 Oct	MORI	N/A	39.8%	47.6%	11%	7.8%
30 Sep	MORI	N/A	34%	50%	15%	16%
29 Sep	Gallup	The Daily Telegraph	37%	46%	15%	9%
15 Sep	NOP	N/A	35.5%	45%	16.5%	9.5%
5 Sep	Gallup	The Daily Telegraph	40%	46.3%	11.3%	6.3%
18 Aug	NOP	N/A	38.5%	44%	14.5%	5.5%
1 Aug	MORI	N/A	38.1%	47.3%	11.7%	9.2%
31 Jul	MORI	N/A	37%	48%	13%	11%
27 Jul	Gallup	The Daily Telegraph	37%	47%	13%	10%
14 Jul	NOP	N/A	40%	43.5%	14%	3.5%
3 Jul	MORI	N/A	41%	46.9%	10.4%	5.9%
26 Jun	Glasgow Central by-election					
23 Jun	Gallup	The Daily Telegraph	41%	43%	13%	2%
16 Jun	NOP	N/A	40.5%	45%	11.5%	4.5%
6 Jun	Gallup	The Daily Telegraph	43%	43.3%	11.7%	0.3%
19 May	NOP	N/A	39%	43.5%	15.5%	4.5%
1 May	MORI	N/A	41.4%	46.5%	10.7%	5.1%
1 May	1980 United Kingdom local elections					
28 Apr	Gallup	The Daily Telegraph	39%	44%	14%	5%
14 Apr	NOP	N/A	36.5%	45%	15%	8.5%
11 Apr	MORI	N/A	35.5%	49.6%	10.9%	14.1%
28 Mar	Gallup	The Daily Telegraph	42%	46%	9%	4%
17 Mar	NOP	N/A	37%	49.5%	11.5%	12.5%
13 Mar	Southend East by-election					
5 Mar	MORI	N/A	35.7%	51.9%	11.2%	16.2%
29 Feb	MORI	N/A	38%	46%	13%	8%
25 Feb	Gallup	The Daily Telegraph	38%	46%	14%	8%
11 Feb	NOP	N/A	37.5%	42%	18%	4.5%
8 Feb	MORI	N/A	37.2%	50.3%	10.7%	13.1%
19 Jan	Gallup	The Daily Telegraph	39%	47%	12%	8%
14 Jan	NOP	N/A	36%	45%	16%	9%
4 Jan	MORI	N/A	40.1%	48.5%	9.5%	8.4%

=== 1979 ===
Survey end date	Pollster	Client	Con	Lab	Lib	Lead
31 Dec	Gallup	The Daily Telegraph	40%	43%	14%	3%
13 Dec	South West Hertfordshire by-election					
10 Dec	NOP	N/A	38%	42%	18%	4%
6 Dec	MORI	N/A	42.1%	46.3%	10.1%	4.2%
2 Dec	Gallup	The Daily Telegraph	40%	45%	13%	5%
12 Nov	NOP	N/A	39%	43.5%	15.5%	4.5%
9 Nov	Gallup	The Daily Telegraph	40.9%	47.2%	10%	6.3%
15 Oct	NOP	N/A	40.5%	45%	12.5%	4.5%
6 Oct	MORI	N/A	44.9%	46%	7.4%	1.1%
30 Sep	Gallup	The Daily Telegraph	41%	46%	11%	5%
27 Sep	Manchester Central by-election					
17 Sep	NOP	N/A	40.5%	45%	12%	4.5%
2 Sep	MORI	N/A	42.8%	47.3%	8.6%	4.5%
31 Aug	Gallup	The Daily Telegraph	42%	43%	12%	1%
13 Aug	NOP	N/A	41.5%	44%	12.5%	2.5%
5 Aug	MORI	N/A	43.1%	45.4%	9.5%	2.3%
31 Jul	Gallup	The Daily Telegraph	44%	45%	9%	1%
16 Jul	NOP	N/A	41%	46%	11.5%	5%
7 Jul	Gallup	The Daily Telegraph	44.2%	45.5%	8.2%	1.3%
18 Jun	Gallup	The Daily Telegraph	42%	43.5%	12%	1.5%
7 Jun	1979 European Parliament election					
3 May	1979 United Kingdom local elections					
3 May	1979 general election		43.9%	36.9%	13.8%	7%
