= 1983 United Kingdom general election in Scotland =

- 9 June 1983

All 72 Scottish seats to the House of Commons
- Turnout: 72.7% (▼4.1%)
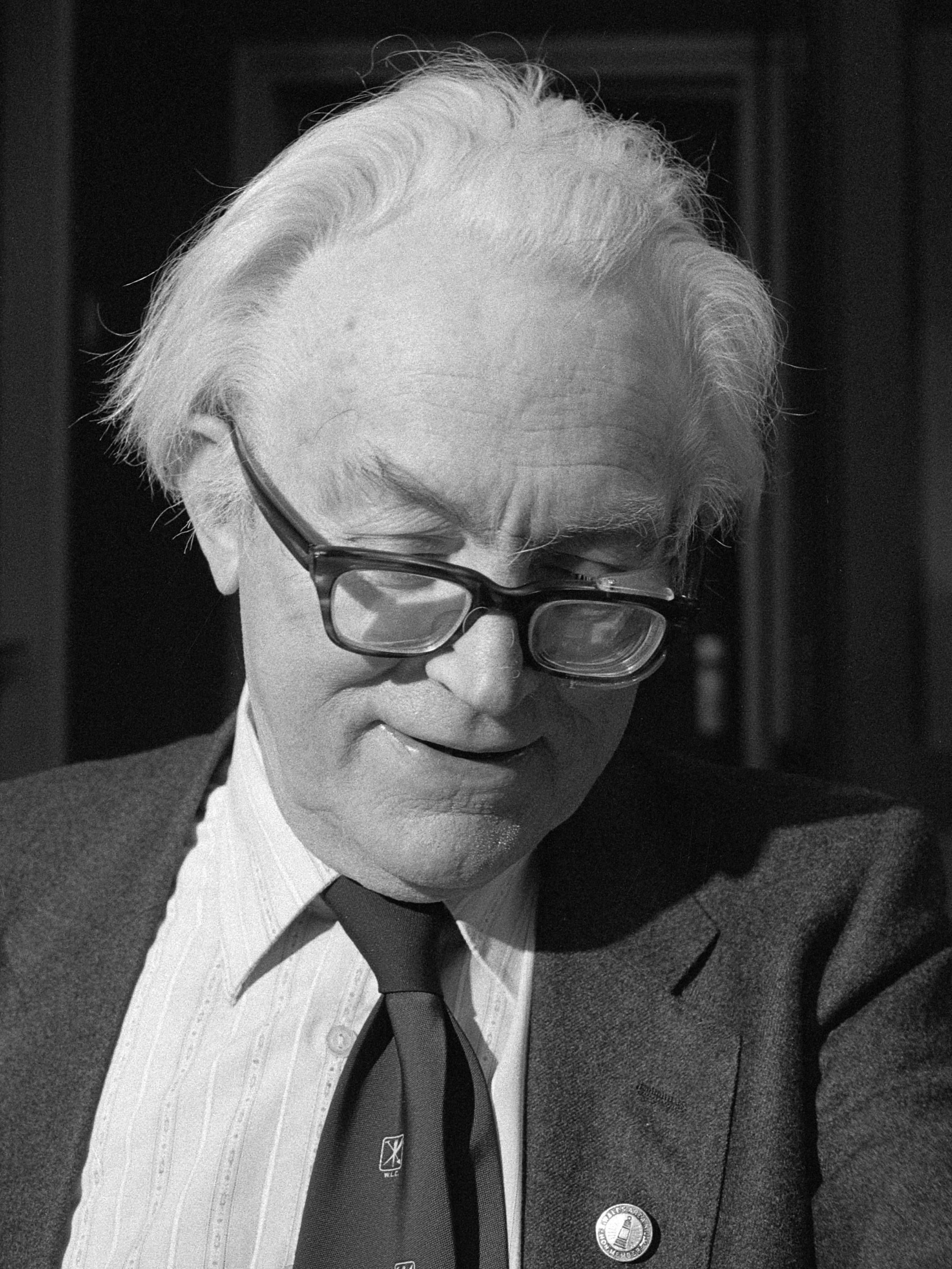

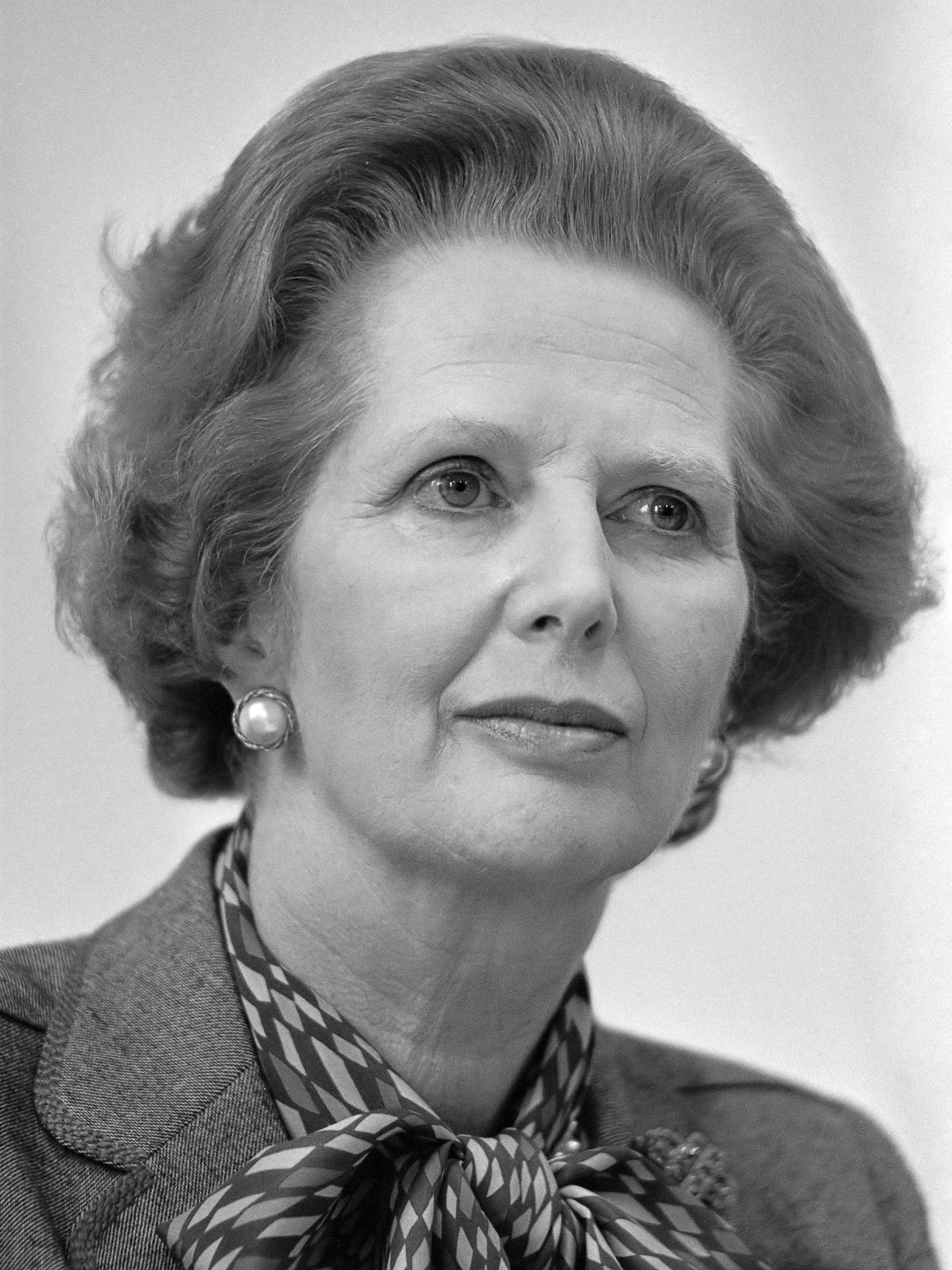

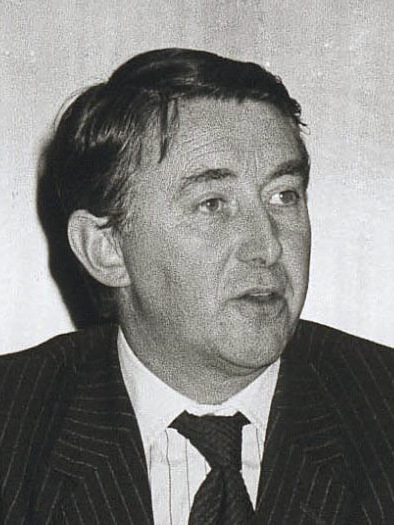

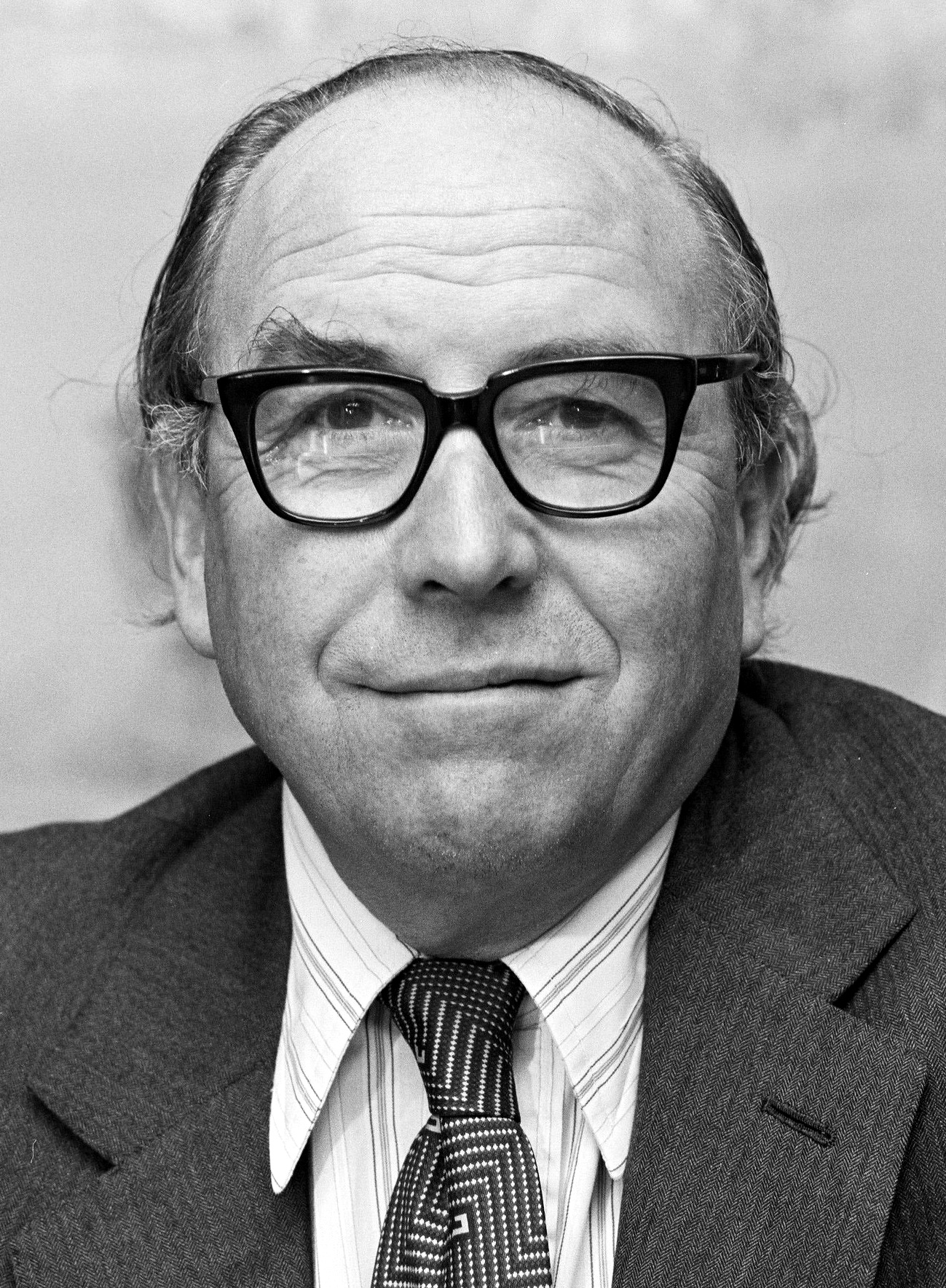

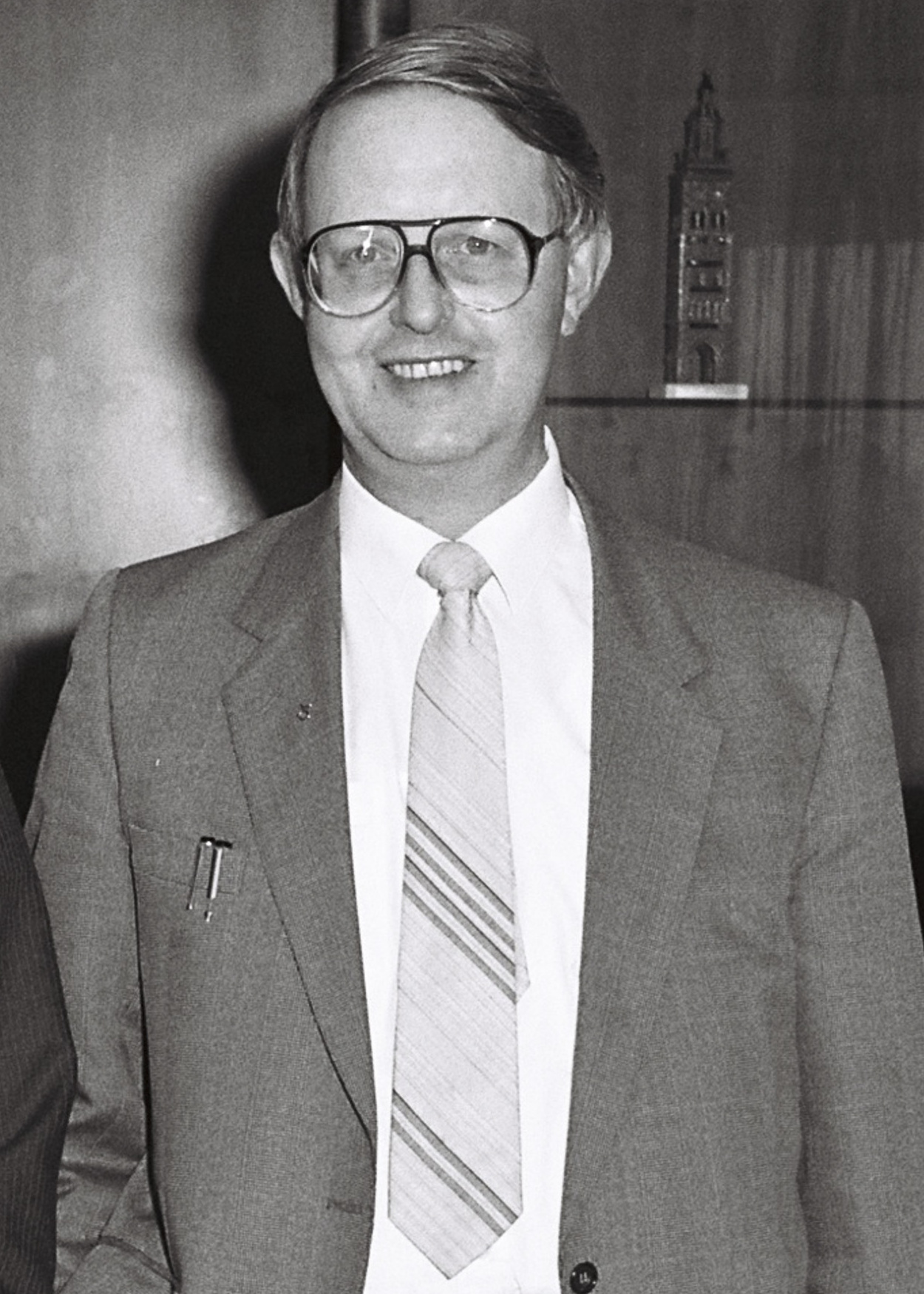
	First party	Second party	Third party
Leader	Michael Foot	Margaret Thatcher	David Steel
Party	Labour	Conservative	Liberal
Alliance			SDP–Liberal Alliance
Leader since	10 November 1980	11 February 1975	7 July 1976
Leader's seat	Blaenau Gwent	Finchley	Tweeddale, Ettrick and Lauderdale
Last election	44 seats, 41.5%	22 seats, 31.4%	3 seats, 9.0%
Seats before	45†	22†	3†
Seats won	41	21	5
Seat change	▼4*	▼1*	▲2*
Popular vote	990,654	801,487	356,224
Percentage	35.1%	28.4%	12.6%
Swing	▼6.5 pp	▼3.0 pp	▲3.6 pp
	Fourth party	Fifth party
Leader	Roy Jenkins	Gordon Wilson
Party	SDP	SNP
Alliance	SDP–Liberal Alliance
Leader since	2 July 1982	15 September 1979
Leader's seat	Glasgow Hillhead	Dundee East
Last election	Did not stand	2 seats, 17.3%
Seats before	0†	2†
Seats won	3	2
Seat change	▲3*	*
Popular vote	336,410	331,975
Percentage	11.9%	11.8%
Swing	New party	▼5.5 pp
- ^{†}Notional 1979 results if held on the 1983 boundaries *Indicates boundary change—so this is a notional figure.

On Thursday 9 June 1983, the 1983 United Kingdom general election was held in Scotland, to elect all 650 members of the House of Commons, with 72 constituencies being in Scotland.

As a result of the third periodic review of Westminster constituencies undertaken by the Boundary Commission for Scotland the number of seats representing Scotland had increased by one to 72 constituencies from the 71 contested between the general elections in 1955 and 1979.

When combined with results from across the United Kingdom, the election saw the Conservatives winning a landslide victory, improving on their 1979 result and achieving their best results since 1935. Although there was a slight drop in their share of the vote, they made significant gains at the expense of Labour. This was at odds with the Scottish result, as Labour remained by far the largest party in Scotland.

== Candidates ==
Below is a table summarising the candidates of the 1983 general election in Scotland.

Affiliation	Candidates
Labour Party	72
Conservative and Unionist Party	72
Scottish National Party	72
Liberal Party	36
Social Democratic Party	36
Ecology Party	11
Communist Party of Great Britain	10
Workers Revolutionary Party	2
British National Party	1
Animal Rights Anti-Vivisection	1 (Note: Candidate John Frederick Robins in Glasgow Hillhead.)
Independent Conservative	1 (Note: Candidate John P. Davidson stood in Glasgow Hillhead.)
Total	314

== Analysis ==
The Labour, Conservative and Scottish National parties all sustained modest losses in vote share to the SDP–Liberal Alliance. The Labour Party won 41 seats, with the Conservative Party winning 21, the Alliance winning eight and the Scottish National Party winning two. The Scottish Conservatives have been unable to match their 1983 Westminster seat total since, although they did record a slightly larger share of the Scottish vote in 2017.

== Results ==
Party	Seats					Aggregate votes		
Party	Total	Gains	Losses	Net	Of total (%)	Total	Of total (%)	Change (%)
Labour	41	0	4	▼4	56.9	990,654	35.1	▼6.5
Conservative	21	0	1	▼1	29.2	801,487	28.4	▼3.0
SDP–Liberal Alliance (Total)	8	5	0	▲5	11.1	692,634	24.5	▲15.5
Liberal	5	2	0	▲2	6.9	356,224	12.6	▲3.6
SDP	3	3	0	▲3	4.2	336,410	11.9	▲11.9
SNP	2	0	0	Steady	2.8	331,975	11.8	▼5.5
Ecology	0	0	0	Steady	—	3,854	0.1	▲0.1
Communist	0	0	0	Steady	—	3,223	0.1	▼0.1
Workers Revolutionary	0	0	0	Steady	—	262	0.0	Steady
BNP	0	New			—	103	0.0	New
Ind. Conservative	0	Did not stand in 1979			—	249	0.0	—N/a
Animal Rights Anti-Vivisection	0	New			—	139	0.0	New
Blank and invalid votes						2,877	—	—
Total	72			0	100.0	2,824,580 (Note: All valid votes excluding spoiled votes.)	100.0	0.0
Registered voters, and turnout						3,886,899	72.7	▼4.1

Popular vote
Labour	35.1%
Conservative	28.4%
Alliance	24.5%
SNP	11.8%
Other	0.28%

Parliamentary seats
Labour	56.9%
Conservative	29.2%
Alliance	11.1%
SNP	2.8%

== See also ==
- 1983 United Kingdom general election in England
- 1983 United Kingdom general election in Northern Ireland
- 1983 United Kingdom general election in Wales
- List of MPs for constituencies in Scotland (1983–1987)
- List of United Kingdom Parliament constituencies (1983–1997) by region
