= 1983 United Kingdom general election in England =

- 9 June 1983

All 523 English seats in the House of Commons
- Turnout: 72.5% (▼3.4 pp)
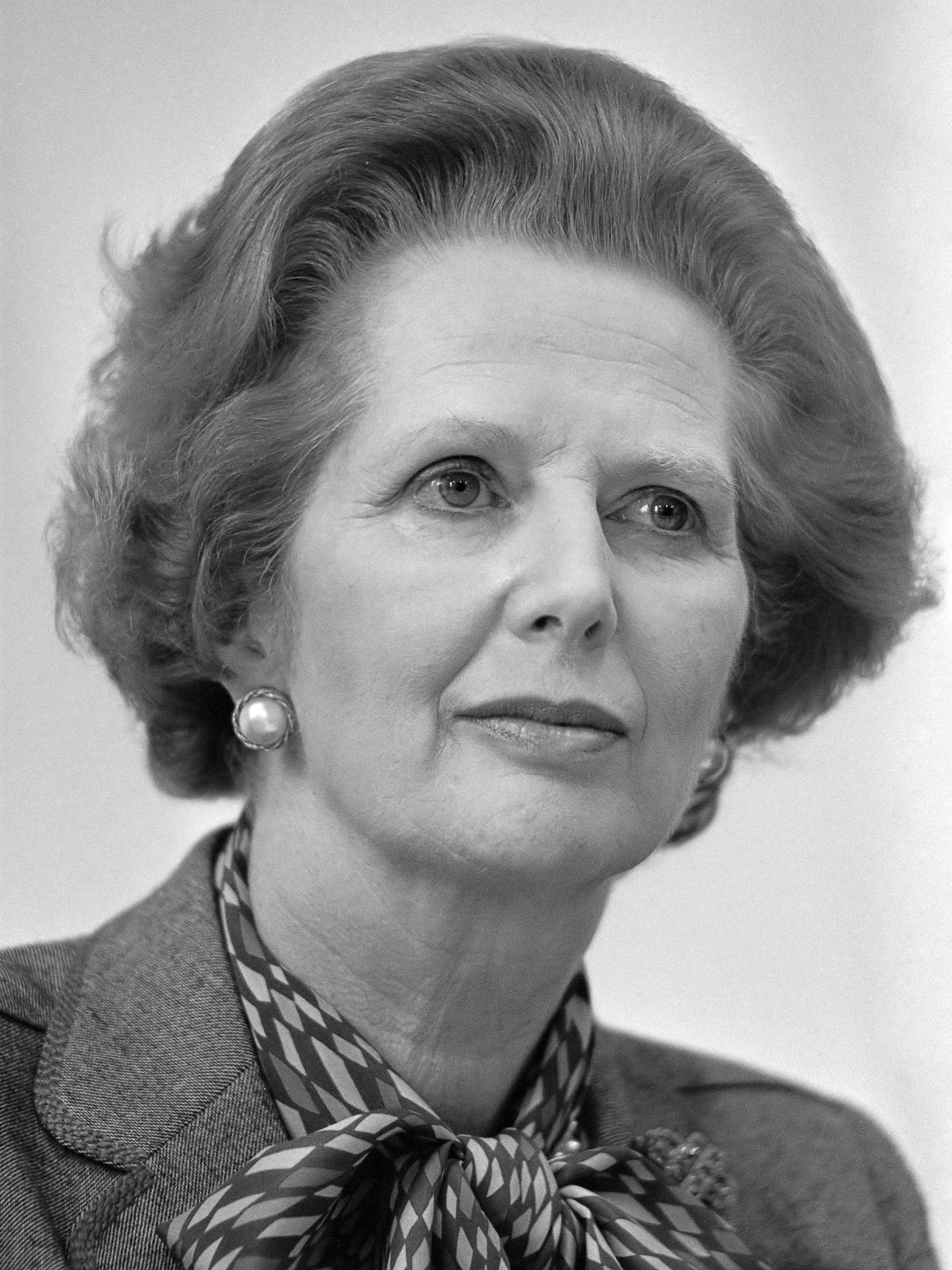

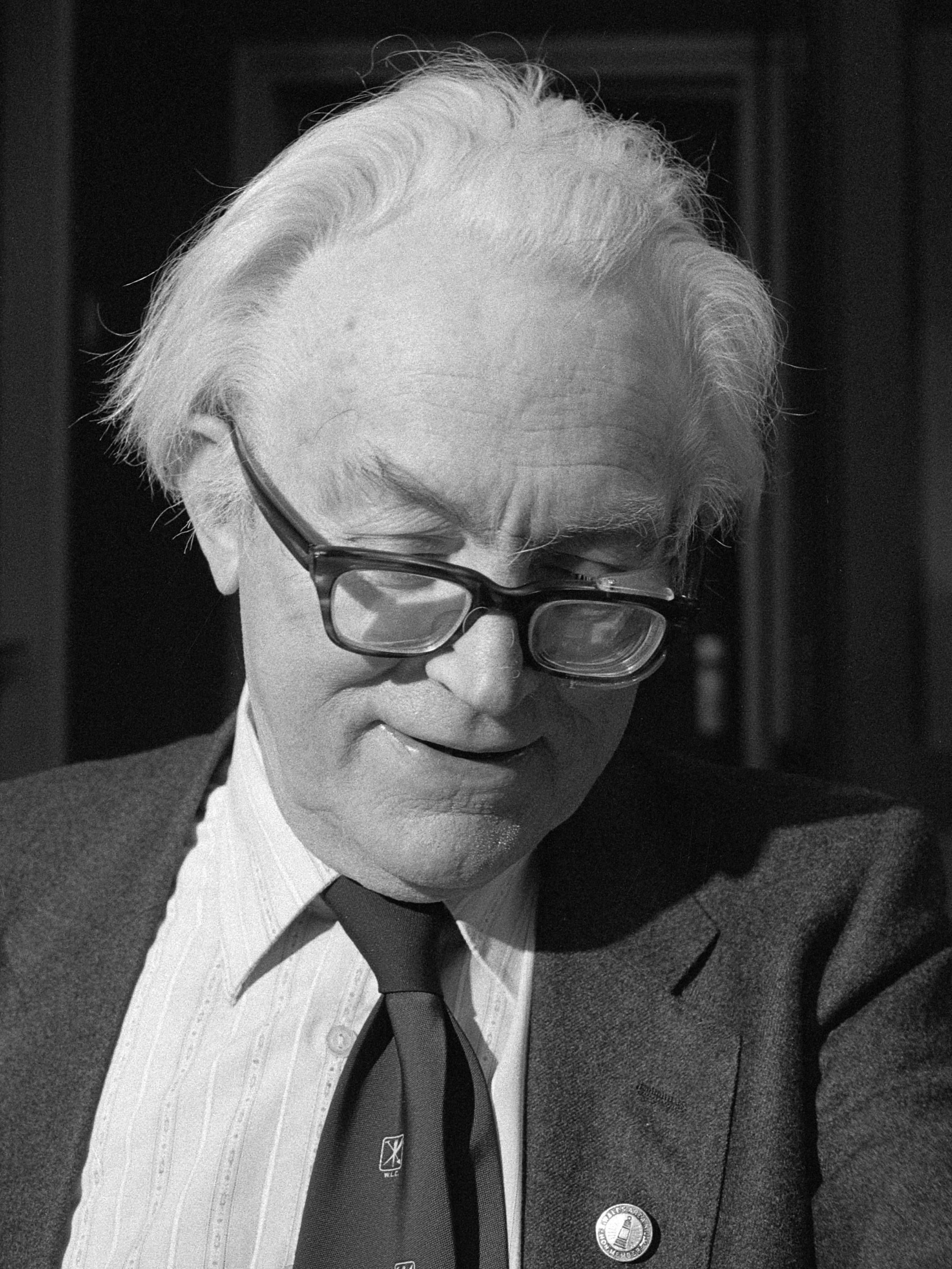

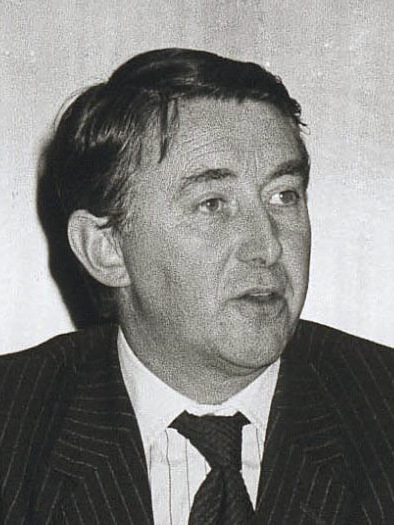

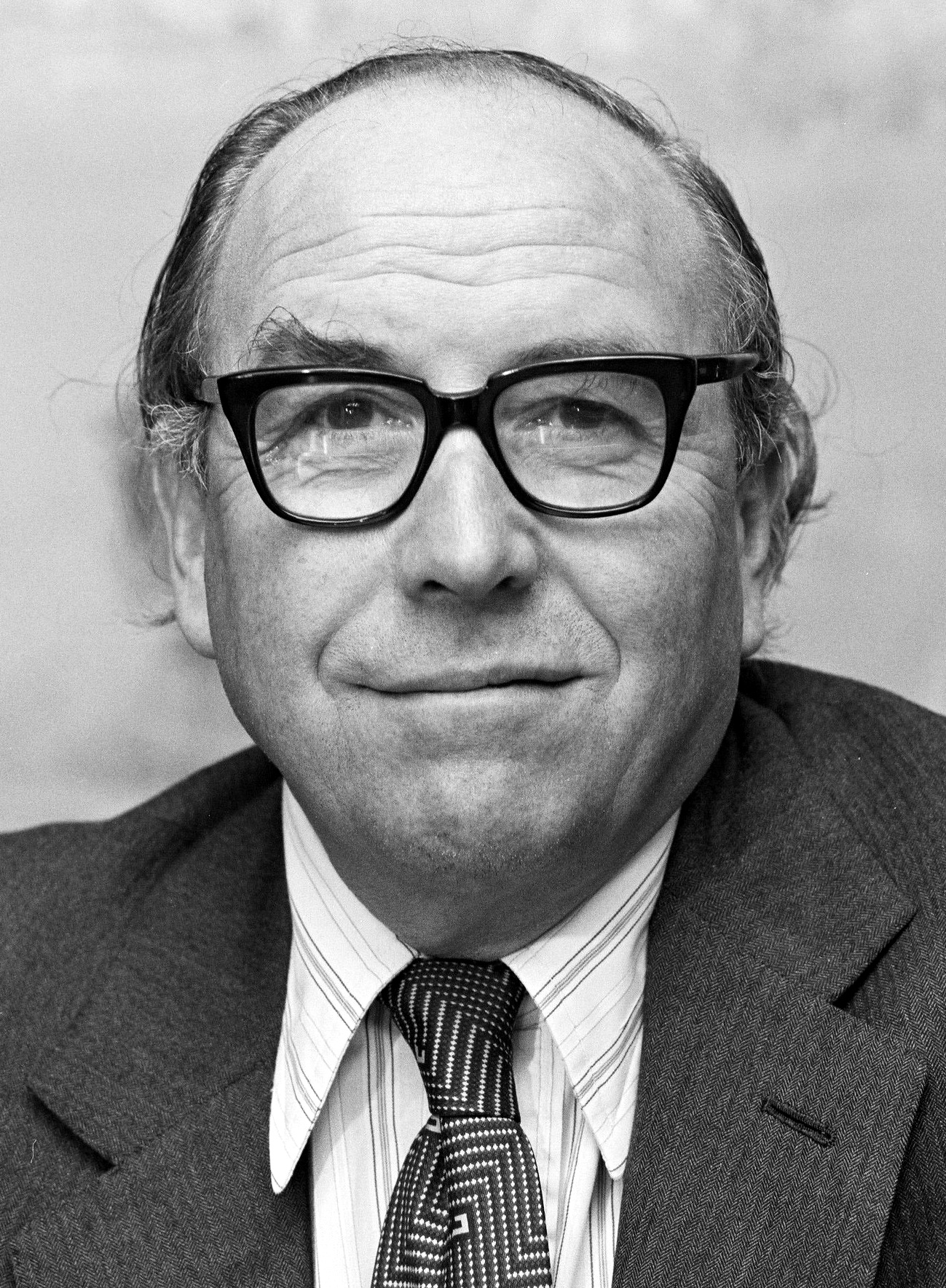
	First party	Second party
Leader	Margaret Thatcher	Michael Foot
Party	Conservative	Labour
Leader since	11 February 1975	10 November 1980
Leader's seat	Finchley	Blaenau Gwent
Last election	306 seats, 47.2%	203 seats, 36.7%
Seats before	325†	193†
Seats won	362	148
Seat change	▲37*	▼45*
Popular vote	11,711,519	6,862,422
Percentage	46.0%	26.8%
Swing	▼1.2 pp	▼9.8 pp
	Third party	Fourth party
Leader	David Steel	Roy Jenkins
Party	Liberal	SDP
Alliance	SDP–Liberal Alliance	SDP–Liberal Alliance
Leader since	7 July 1976	2 July 1982
Leader's seat	Tweeddale, Ettrick and Lauderdale	Glasgow Hillhead
Last election	7 seats, 14.9%	Did not stand
Seats before	5†	0†
Seats won	10	3
Seat change	▲5*	▲3*
Popular vote	3,658,903	3,056,054
Percentage	14.4%	12.0%
Swing	▼0.5 pp	New party
- ^{†}Notional 1979 results if held on the 1983 boundaries *Indicates boundary change—so this is a notional figure.

On Thursday 9 June 1983, the 1983 United Kingdom general election was held in England, to elect all 650 members of the House of Commons, with 523 constituencies being in England.

The number of seats for each region that were changed under the third periodic review of Westminster constituencies are indicated respectively. This was the first election following this review, with the number of English constituencies increasing from the 516 used between 1955 to 1979 to 523 constituencies, and over 90 per cent of boundaries of existing constituencies being changed.

== Candidates ==
Below is a table summarising the candidates of the 1983 general election in England, showing parties that stood 10 or more candidates each.

Affiliation	Candidates
Conservative and Unionist Party	523
Labour Party	523
Liberal Party	267
Social Democratic Party	256
Ecology Party	90
Independent	81
National Front	60
British National Party	52
Communist Party of Great Britain	22
Workers Revolutionary Party	18
Official Monster Raving Loony Party	12 (Note: Figure includes two candidates who simply stood as 'Loony Society' candidates in Dulwich and Kingston-upon-Thames.)
Wessex Regionalists	10
Independent Conservative	10
Other	76
Total	2,000

== Analysis ==
The Conservative Party won a landslide majority of English seats, gaining 37 seats for a total of 362 under the new boundaries. The Labour Party came second, winning 148 MPs, a decline of 45. Labour's share of the vote in England was its lowest since 1918, and its number of English MPs was its smallest since 1931. The SDP–Liberal Alliance won 26.4% of the popular vote, just 0.4% behind Labour, but won only 13 seats compared to 148 for Labour, due to the first-past-the-post electoral system.

Two future leaders of the Labour Party were first elected to Parliament at this election in England: Tony Blair (1994–2007) in Sedgefield and Jeremy Corbyn (2015–2020) in Islington North. In addition, future Leader of the Liberal Democrats Paddy Ashdown was elected in Yeovil for the first time. Michael Howard, who later served as Home Secretary in government and as party leader from 2003 to 2005, was also first elected to Parliament in Folkestone and Hythe. Other prominent members in including Edwina Currie and Neil Hamilton for the Conservative Party and Clare Short for Labour also entered the House of Commons in English constituencies.

A number of prominent Members of Parliament stepped aside or lost their seats. Former Labour Prime Minister Harold Wilson stood down from Parliament after 38 years, while the Alliance's Shirley Williams and Bill Pitt lost their seats only a short time after having won them. Joan Lestor and Tony Benn and Speaker of the House of Commons and former Labour Cabinet Minister George Thomas also departed from Parliament at this election, although Benn would return after winning a by-election in Chesterfield the following year, and Lestor returned to Parliament after winning a seat at the next general election in 1987.

== Results ==
Party	Seats					Aggregate votes		
Party	Total	Gains	Losses	Net	Of all (%)	Total	Of all (%)	Change (%)
Conservative	362	40	3	▲37	69.2	11,711,519	46.0	▼1.2
Labour	148	4	49	▼45	28.3	6,862,422	26.8	▼9.8
SDP–Liberal Alliance (Total)	13	New		▲8	2.5	6,714,957	26.4	New
Liberal	10	0	5	▲5	1.9	3,658,903	14.4	▼0.5
SDP	3	New		▲3	0.6	3,056,054	12.0	New
Ecology	0	0	0	Steady	—	46,484	0.2	▲0.1
Independent	0	0	0	Steady	—	33,840	0.1	Steady
National Front	0	0	0	Steady	—	27,065	0.1	▼0.6
BNP	0	New			—	14,364	0.0	New
Communist	0	0	0	Steady	—	6,368	0.0	Steady
Workers Revolutionary	0	0	0	Steady	—	3,280	0.0	Steady
Independent Labour	0	0	0	Steady	—	16,647	0.1	Steady
Ind. Conservative	0	0	0	Steady	—	12,837	0.1	▲0.1
Monster Raving Loony	0	New			—	3,623	0.0	New
Pro-Corporal Punishment (Note: Three such candidate stood in Arundel, Harrogate and Littleborough and Saddleworth.)	0	New			—	2,113	0.0	New
Mebyon Kernow	0	0	0	Steady	—	1,151	0.0	Steady
Wessex Regionalists	0	0	0	Steady	—	1,750	0.0	Steady
Anti-Common Market	0	0	0	Steady	—	1,177	0.0	Steady
Independent Communist	0	New			—	1,116	0.0	New
Associates with Licensees	0	New			—	934	0.0	New
Nationalist	0	New			—	874	0.0	New
Independent Liberal	0	0	0	Steady	—	656	0.0	Steady
Revolutionary Communist	0	New			—	581	0.0	New
Spare the Earth	0	New			—	524	0.0	New
Women for Life on Earth	0	New			—	517	0.0	New
National Labour	0	Did not stand in 1979			—	456	0.0	New
Nobody Party	0	New			—	386	0.0	New
Fancy Dress	0	0	0	Steady	—	374	0.0	Steady
Cornish Nationalist	0	0	0	Steady	—	364	0.0	Steady
Anti-Deportation	0	New			—	355	0.0	New
Multi-Racial Party	0	New			—	327	0.0	New
FTACMP	0	New			—	325	0.0	New
Freedom	0	New			—	324	0.0	New
Progressive Liberal	0	New			—	319	0.0	New
Freddie's Alternative Medicine	0	New			—	318	0.0	New
Fellowship	0	0	0	Steady	—	242	0.0	Steady
Nationalist (Cantebury)	0	New			—	226	0.0	New
One-nation Conservative	0	New			—	213	0.0	New
Gizza Job	0	New			—	212	0.0	New
Prosperity for All	0	New			—	221	0.0	New
Isle of Wight Residents	0	New			—	208	0.0	New
Unemployment Party	0	New			—	204	0.0	New
Modern Democratic	0	New			—	189	0.0	New
Servicemen and Citizen	0	New			—	177	0.0	New
Socialist (GB)	0	0	0	Steady	—	173	0.0	Steady
Assassin's Bullet	0	New			—	173	0.0	New
Traditional English Food	0	New			—	172	0.0	New
Socialist Workers	0	New			—	161	0.0	New
Christian Democrat	0	New			—	159	0.0	New
New Britain	0	0	0	Steady	—	154	0.0	Steady
Pro-Nuclear War Gay Rights	0	New			—	147	0.0	New
Ethnic Minority	0	New			—	146	0.0	New
Independent For Referendum	0	New			—	135	0.0	New
Anti-Courription	0	New			—	128	0.0	New
Against Cuts to Education	0	New			—	123	0.0	New
Common Market Party	0	New			—	113	0.0	New
Justice for Divorced Fathers	0	New			—	113	0.0	New
Islington and Finsbury Party	0	New			—	102	0.0	New
Black and White Unity	0	New			—	86	0.0	New
Ban Licensing Law Society	0	New			—	75	0.0	New
World Government	0	New			—	67	0.0	New
Rail not Motorway	0	New			—	42	0.0	New
Independent Workers Revolutionary	0	New			—	38	0.0	New
Law and Order for Gotham	0	New			—	37	0.0	New
Anti-Censorship	0	New			—	28	0.0	New
Community Party	0	0	0	Steady	—	22	0.0	Steady
Belgrano Blood-Hunger	0	New			—	13	0.0	New
Blank and invalid votes						39,790	—	—
Total	523			0	100.0	25,472,646 (Note: All valid votes excluding spoiled votes.)	100.0	0.0
Registered voters, and turnout						35,143,479	72.5	▼3.4

Popular vote
Conservative	46.0%
Labour	26.8%
Alliance	26.4%
Other	0.7%

Parliament seats
Conservative	69.2%
Labour	28.3%
Alliance	2.5%

== By region ==
Note: these results are based on the previously-used standard statistical regions, not the current regions of England established in 1994.

The number of seats for each region that were changed under the third periodic review of Westminster constituencies are indicated respectively.

=== North ===
This region included Northumberland, County Durham, Tyne and Wear and constituencies in the defunct county of Cleveland in the current English region of North East England, as well as Cumbria.

Party	Seats					Aggregate Votes		
Party	Total	Gains	Losses	Net	Of all (%)	Total	Of all (%)	Change (%)
Labour	26	1	4	▼3	72.2	684,120	40.2	▼1.9
Conservative	8	3	1	▲2	22.2	589,128	34.6	▼9.2
Alliance	2	1	0	▲1	5.6	424,987	25.0	▲12.4
Others	0	0	0	Steady	0.0	2,507	0.1	▼1.4
Total	36			Steady		1,700,742		

=== Yorkshire and the Humber ===
Like the current statistical region, this region included North Yorkshire, West Yorkshire, South Yorkshire and the East Riding of Yorkshire, North Lincolnshire and North East Lincolnshire constituencies in Humberside.

Party	Seats					Aggregate Votes		
Party	Total	Gains	Losses	Net	Of all (%)	Total	Of all (%)	Change (%)
Labour	28	0	6	▼6	51.9	925,084	35.3	▼9.5
Conservative	24	4	0	▲4	44.4	1,013,311	38.7	▼0.8
Alliance	2	1	0	▲1	3.7	669,377	25.5	▲10.7
Others	0	0	0	Steady	0.0	13,516	0.5	▼0.4
Total	54			▼1		2,621,288		

Labour won the most seats in the region; however, the Conservatives won more votes. A similar result in which Labour won more seats despite the Conservatives winning more votes would next occur in 2019.

=== East Midlands ===
Like the current statistical region, this region included Derbyshire, Lincolnshire (excluding North Lincolnshire and North East Lincolnshire), Northamptonshire, Nottinghamshire, Leicestershire and Rutland.

Party	Seats					Aggregate Votes		
Party	Total	Gains	Losses	Net	Of all (%)	Total	Of all (%)	Change (%)
Conservative	34	11	0	▲11	81.0	1,013,384	47.2	▲0.5
Labour	8	0	8	▼8	19.0	600,624	28.0	▼10.2
Alliance	0	0	0	Steady	0.0	517,098	24.1	▲9.9
Others	0	0	0	Steady	0.0	17,266	0.8	▼0.1
Total	42			▲3		2,148,372		

=== East Anglia ===
This region included Cambridgeshire, Norfolk and Suffolk.

Party	Seats					Aggregate Votes		
Party	Total	Gains	Losses	Net	Of all (%)	Total	Of all (%)	Change (%)
Conservative	18	5	0	▲5	90.0	539,418	51.0	▲0.2
Alliance	1	0	0	Steady	5.0	298,624	28.2	▲12.2
Labour	1	0	2	▼2	5.0	216,906	20.5	▼12.1
Others	0	0	0	Steady	0.0	2,934	0.3	▼0.3
Total	20			▲3		1,057,882		

=== Greater London ===
This consisted of the constituencies within the county and region of Greater London. These results are separate from those recorded in South East England.

Party	Seats					Aggregate Votes		
Party	Total	Gains	Losses	Net	Of all (%)	Total	Of all (%)	Change (%)
Conservative	56	6	0	▲6	67.7	1,517,105	43.9	▼2.1
Labour	26	0	16	▼16	31.0	1,031,539	29.8	▼9.8
Alliance	2	2	0	▲2	2.4	853,360	24.7	▲12.8
Others	0	0	0	Steady	0.0	55,774	1.6	▼0.8
Total	84			▼8		3,457,778		

Greater London

=== South East England ===
This region included Hampshire, Isle of Wight, Oxfordshire, Berkshire, Buckinghamshire, Kent, Surrey, East Sussex and West Sussex within the current South East England. However, it also included Bedfordshire, Hertfordshire, Essex within the current East of England region.

In addition, the standard statical region included the results of the constituencies within the county and region of Greater London, though the results for Greater London were also recorded separately.

Party	Seats					Aggregate Votes		
Party	Total	Gains	Losses	Net	Of all (%)	Total	Of all (%)	Change (%)
Conservative	162 (Note: Figure includes 56 Conservative MPs elected in Greater London.)	19	0	▲19	84.4	4,593,712	50.5	▼0.9
Labour	27 (Note: Figure includes 26 Labour MPs elected in Greater London.)	0	19	▼19	14.1	1,924,854	21.1	▼10.7
Alliance	3 (Note: Figure includes 2 Liberal MPs elected in Greater London.)	2	0	▲2	1.6	2,940,105	27.4	▲12.1
Others	0	0	0	Steady	0.0	92,773	1.0	▼0.5
Total	192 (Note: 84 Seats were in Greater London; 108 seats were in the standard statistical region of South East England.)			▲2		9,101,444		

=== South West England ===
Like the current statistical region, this region included Cornwall, Dorset, Devon, Gloucestershire, Somerset, Wiltshire, and the defunct county of Avon.

Party	Seats					Aggregate Votes		
Party	Total	Gains	Losses	Net	Of all (%)	Total	Of all (%)	Change (%)
Conservative	44	5	1	▲4	91.7	1,295,737	51.4	▼0.2
Alliance	3	2	0	▲2	6.2	836,547	14.7	▲10.7
Labour	1	0	4	▼4	2.1	370,541	33.2	▼9.9
Others	0	0	0	Steady	0.0	19,129	0.8	▼0.5
Total	48			▲2		2,521,954		

=== West Midlands ===
Like the current statistical region, this region included Shropshire, Staffordshire, Warwickshire, the county of West Midlands, Herefordshire and Worcestershire.

Party	Seats					Aggregate Votes		
Party	Total	Gains	Losses	Net	Of all (%)	Total	Of all (%)	Change (%)
Conservative	36	5	0	▲5	62.1	1,261,378	45.0	▼2.1
Labour	22	0	3	▼3	37.9	874,190	31.2	▼8.9
Alliance	0	0	0	Steady	0.0	655,982	23.4	▲11.9
Others	0	0	0	Steady	0.0	12,444	0.4	▼0.9
Total	58			▲2		2,803,994		

=== North West ===
This region included Lancashire, Greater Manchester, Merseyside and Cheshire.

Party	Seats					Aggregate Votes		
Party	Total	Gains	Losses	Net	Of all (%)	Total	Of all (%)	Change (%)
Conservative	36	8	2	▲6	49.3	1,405,451	40.0	▼3.6
Labour	35	2	12	▼10	47.9	1,266,103	36.0	▼6.8
Alliance	2	0	0	Steady	2.7	822,237	23.4	▲10.5
Others	0	0	0	Steady	0.0	23,179	0.7	Steady
Total	73			▼4		3,516,970		

== See also ==
- 1983 United Kingdom general election in Scotland
- 1983 United Kingdom general election in Wales
- 1983 United Kingdom general election in Northern Ireland
- List of United Kingdom Parliament constituencies (1983–1997) by region
