= 1983 United Kingdom general election in Wales =

- 9 June 1983

All 38 Welsh seats to the House of Commons
- Turnout: 76.1% (▼3.3 pp)
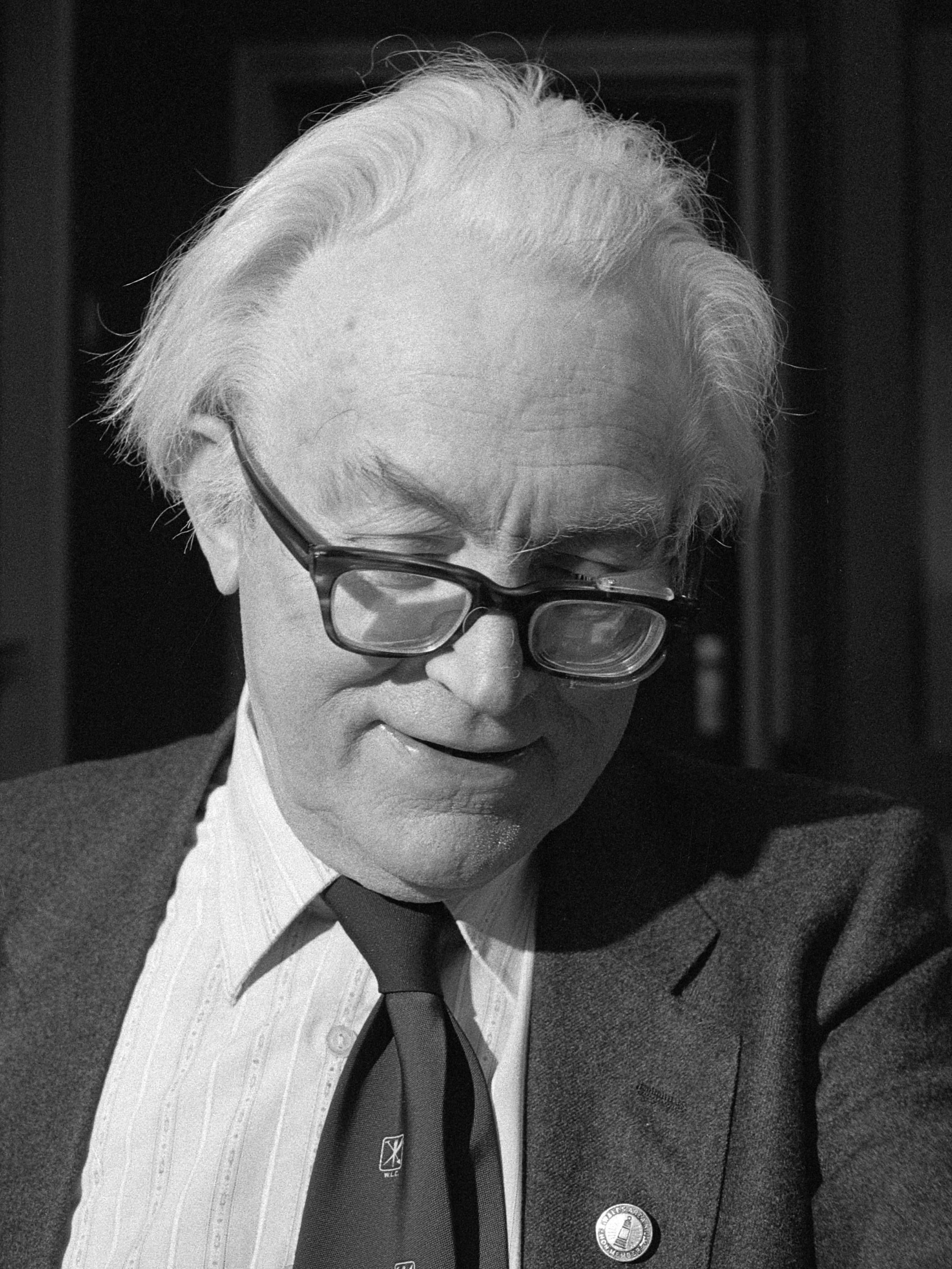

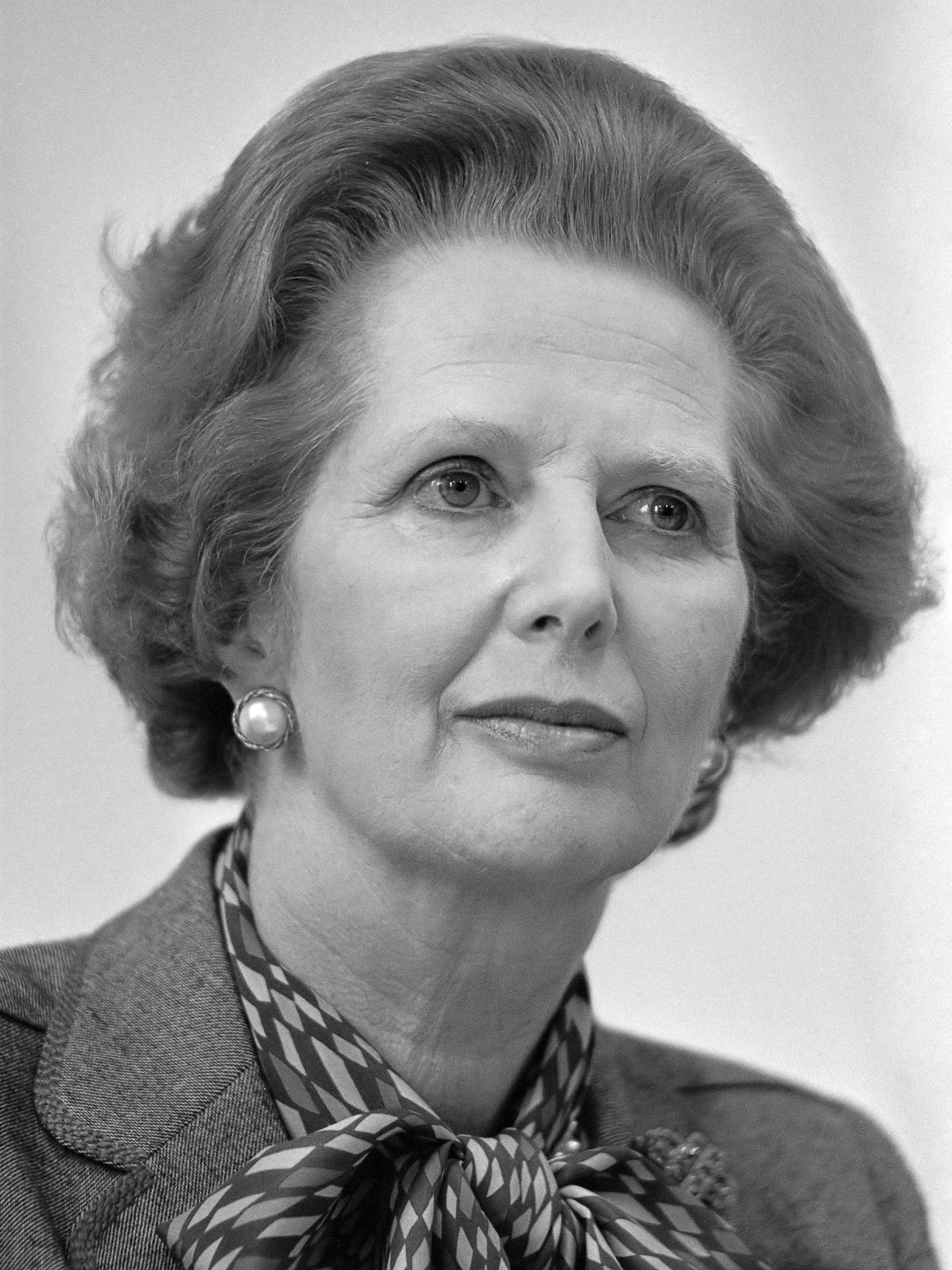

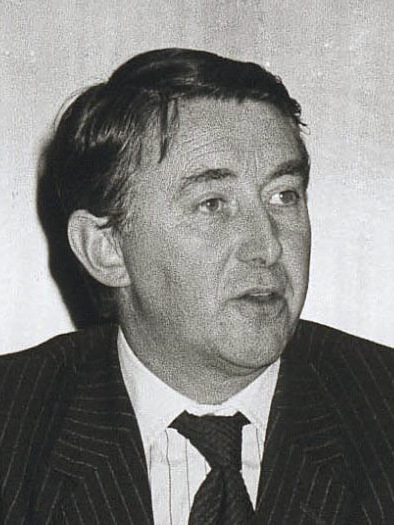

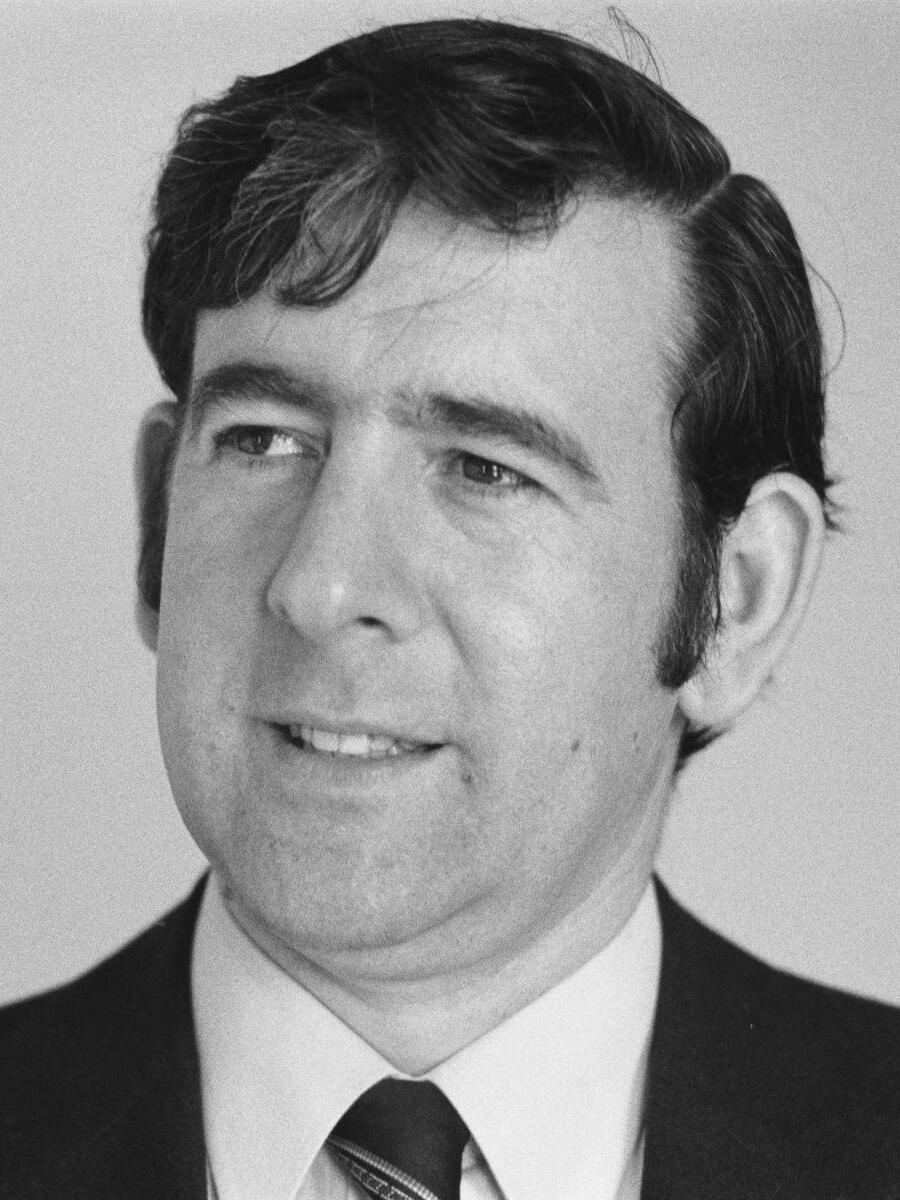

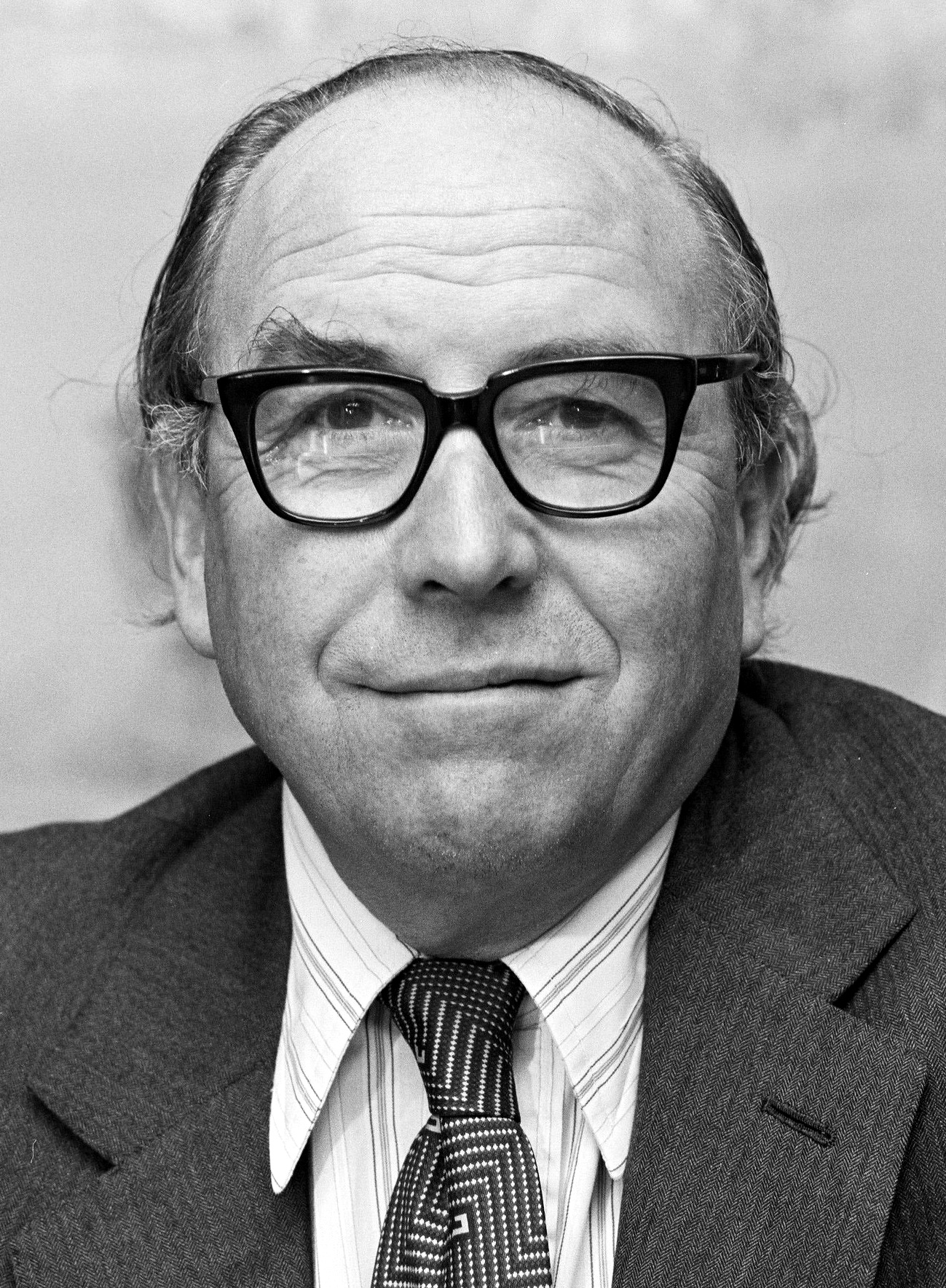
| | First party | Second party | Third party |
|---|---|---|---|
| Leader | Michael Foot | Margaret Thatcher | David Steel |
| Party | Labour | Conservative | Liberal |
| Alliance | | | SDP–Liberal Alliance |
| Leader since | 10 November 1980 | 11 February 1975 | 7 July 1976 |
| Leader's seat | Blaenau Gwent | Finchley | Tweeddale, Ettrick and Lauderdale |
| Last election | 21 seats, 46.9% | 11 seats, 32.2% | 2 seats, 10.6% |
| Seats before | 23† | 12† | 1† |
| Seats won | 20 (Note: Figure includes Speaker of the House of Commons George Thomas in Cardiff West.) | 14 | 2 |
| Seat change | ▼3* | ▲2* | ▲1* |
| Popular vote | 603,858 | 499,310 | 194,988 |
| Percentage | 37.5% | 31.0% | 12.1% |
| Swing | ▼9.4 pp | ▼1.2 pp | ▲1.5 pp |
| | Fourth party | Fifth party |
| Leader | Dafydd Wigley | Roy Jenkins |
| Party | Plaid Cymru | SDP |
| Alliance | | SDP–Liberal Alliance |
| Leader since | 1981 | 2 July 1982 |
| Leader's seat | Caernarfon | Glasgow Hillhead |
| Last election | 2 seats, 8.0% | Did not stand |
| Seats before | 2† | 0† |
| Seats won | 2 | 0 |
| Seat change | * | * |
| Popular vote | 125,309 | 178,370 |
| Percentage | 7.8% | 11.1% |
| Swing | ▼0.2 pp | New party |
- ^{†}Notional 1979 results if held on the 1983 boundaries *Indicates boundary change—so this is a notional figure.

On Thursday 9 June 1983, the 1983 United Kingdom general election was held in Wales, to elect all 650 members of the House of Commons, with 38 constituencies being in Wales.

As party of the third periodic review of Westminster constituencies, the boundaries were changed in Wales, with the number of constituencies increased from 36 to 38 contested between the general elections in 1955 and 1979.

Thatcher's decisive leadership in the Falklands War had led to a British victory and a recovery of her personal and the government's popularity in 1982, and economic growth had simultaneously resumed. The Conservative Party won a landslide victory across the United Kingdom. Nationally, when combined with results from across the United Kingdom, the election saw the Conservatives winning a landslide victory, improving on their 1979 result and achieving their best results since 1935.

== Background ==
Thatcher was a controversial figure in Wales. In 1983 Thatcher launched the election campaign at a rally in Cardiff attempting to appeal to Labour voters. She led the Conservative Party to its best general election result in Wales with 14 seats.

In 1985 Thatcher began her coal mine closing programme. She closed multiple mines in South Wales including; Aberpergwm, Abertillery, Bedwas, Garw, Margam, Penrhiwceiber, St Johns and Treforgan. In 1986 Thatcher also closed Bersham, Cwm and Nantgarw coal mines.

In response to the closures, one Welsh union worker said: "Thatcher killed, killed this town... we were always tainted with that brush of, of what Thatcher did to us to be quite honest." The closures led to decades of unemployment, under-employment, ill health, increased crime, increased drug use and a lack of hope in the Welsh valleys. Many parts of the valleys are still yet to fully recover from these effects.

== Candidates ==
Below is a table summarising the candidates of the 1983 general election in Wales.

| Affiliation | Candidates |
|---|---|
| Labour Party | 38 |
| Conservative and Unionist Party | 38 |
| Plaid Cymru | 38 |
| Liberal Party | 19 |
| Social Democratic Party | 19 |
| Ecology Party | 7 |
| Communist Party of Great Britain | 3 |
| Independent | 3 (Note: The candidates that stood were Richard Booth in Brecon and Radnorshire, David Rowlands in Montgomeryshire and G. S. Phillips in Pembrokeshire.) |
| British National Party | 1 |
| Workers Revolutionary Party | 1 |
| Computer Democrat | 1 (Note: Candidate J. Donovan stood in Neath.) |
| Freedom from World Domination | 1 (Note: Candidate Benjamin Lewis stood in Cardiff South and Penarth.) |
| Total | 169 |

== Analysis ==
Although he Conservatives won the general election, the Labour Party won the most votes in Wales. The Labour Party again won a majority of Welsh MPs, but the party's vote share declined by 9.4% and they lost three seats. In this election popular vote and percentage gap produced between Labour and Conservative parties would be the smallest one up until 2019 UK general election. The Conservative Party also won its greatest number on top of his high in the previous election, and which would also only be matched in the 2019 result in Wales.

In terms of changes in seats between the Labour Party and Conservatives, The Conservatives gained two seats. It won the newly created seat of Cardiff Central. Conservative candidate Stefan Terlezki won Cardiff West from Labour, with the seat being held by retiring Speaker of the House of Commons George Thomas.

Several boundaries changes had occurred between this election and the last, with the Conservative Party holding Anglesey, Brecon and Radnorshire, Pembrokeshire, Cardiff North, Conwy and Monmouth, as well as nominally Clwyd North West and Clwyd South West. It won the new seats of Bridgend, Delyn, Newport West and Vale of Glamorgan.

However, the Conservatives lost one seat, with the Liberal Party, which was in the SDP–Liberal Alliance with the newly-formed Social Democratic Party, regained the seat of Montgomeryshire, which it had lost at the previous election. Across the UK the Conservatives won a landslide majority and continued in office for a second term. Accordingly, Liberal candidate Alex Carlile entered Parliament. The Liberal Party retained Ceredigion, which had primarily replaced it previously-held Liberal seat of Cardiganshire. Its allies, the Social Democratic Party fielded as many candidates as the Liberal Party, obtaining an almost even vote share with the Liberal, although it did not achieve any representation in terms of the seats in Wales.

Plaid Cymru retained two seats, holding the new seats which replaced its old seats. These were Meirionnydd Nant Conwy and Caernarfon.

== Results ==
Below is a table summarising the results of the 1983 general election in Wales, the changes are compared with the notional results following the redistribution of seats before the election.

| Party | Seats | | | | | Aggregate votes | | |
| Party | Total | Gains | Losses | Net | Of total (%) | Total | Of total (%) | Change (%) |
|---|---|---|---|---|---|---|---|---|
| Labour | 20 | 0 | 3 | ▼3 | 52.6 | 603,858 | 37.5 | ▼9.4 |
| Conservative | 14 | 3 | 1 | ▲2 | 36.8 | 499,310 | 31.0 | ▼1.2 |
| SDP–Liberal Alliance (Total) | 2 | New | | ▲1 | 5.3 | 373,358 | 23.2 | New |
| Liberal | 2 | 1 | 0 | ▲1 | 5.3 | 194,988 | 12.1 | ▲1.5 |
| SDP | 0 | New | | | — | 178,370 | 11.1 | New |
| Plaid Cymru | 2 | 0 | 0 | Steady | 5.3 | 125,309 | 7.8 | ▼0.2 |
| Ecology | 0 | 0 | 0 | Steady | — | 3,510 | 0.2 | ▲0.1 |
| Communist | 0 | 0 | 0 | Steady | — | 2,015 | 0.1 | ▼0.2 |
| Independent | 0 | Did not stand in 1979 | | | — | 901 | 0.1 | —N/a |
| Workers Revolutionary | 0 | 0 | 0 | Steady | — | 256 | 0.0 | Steady |
| Freedom | 0 | New | | | — | 165 | 0.0 | New |
| BNP | 0 | New | | | — | 154 | 0.0 | New |
| Computer Democrat | 0 | New | | | — | 150 | 0.0 | New |
| Blank and invalid votes | | | | | | 4,084 | — | — |
| Total | 38 | | | 0 | 100.0 | 1,608,986 (Note: All valid votes excluding spoiled votes.) | 100.0 | 0.0 |
| Registered voters, and turnout | | | | | | 2,113,855 | 76.1 | ▼3.3 |

Popular vote
| Labour | 37.5% |
| Conservative | 31.0% |
| Alliance | 23.2% |
| Plaid Cymru | 7.8% |
| Other | 0.4% |

Parliament seats
| Labour | 52.6% |
| Conservative | 36.8% |
| Alliance | 5.3% |
| Plaid Cymru | 5.3% |

== See also ==
- 1983 United Kingdom general election in England
- 1983 United Kingdom general election in Scotland
- 1983 United Kingdom general election in Northern Ireland
- List of MPs for constituencies in Wales (1983–1987)
- List of United Kingdom Parliament constituencies (1983–1997) by region
