= 1983 United Kingdom general election =

- 9 June 1983

All 650 seats in the House of Commons 326 (Note: The sole Sinn Féin MP to be elected, Gerry Adams, did not take his seat, so the effective number of seats in the House of Commons was 649, making a majority 325 seats.) seats needed for a majority
- Opinion polls
- Registered: 42,192,999
- Turnout: 30,671,137; 72.7% (▼3.3 pp)
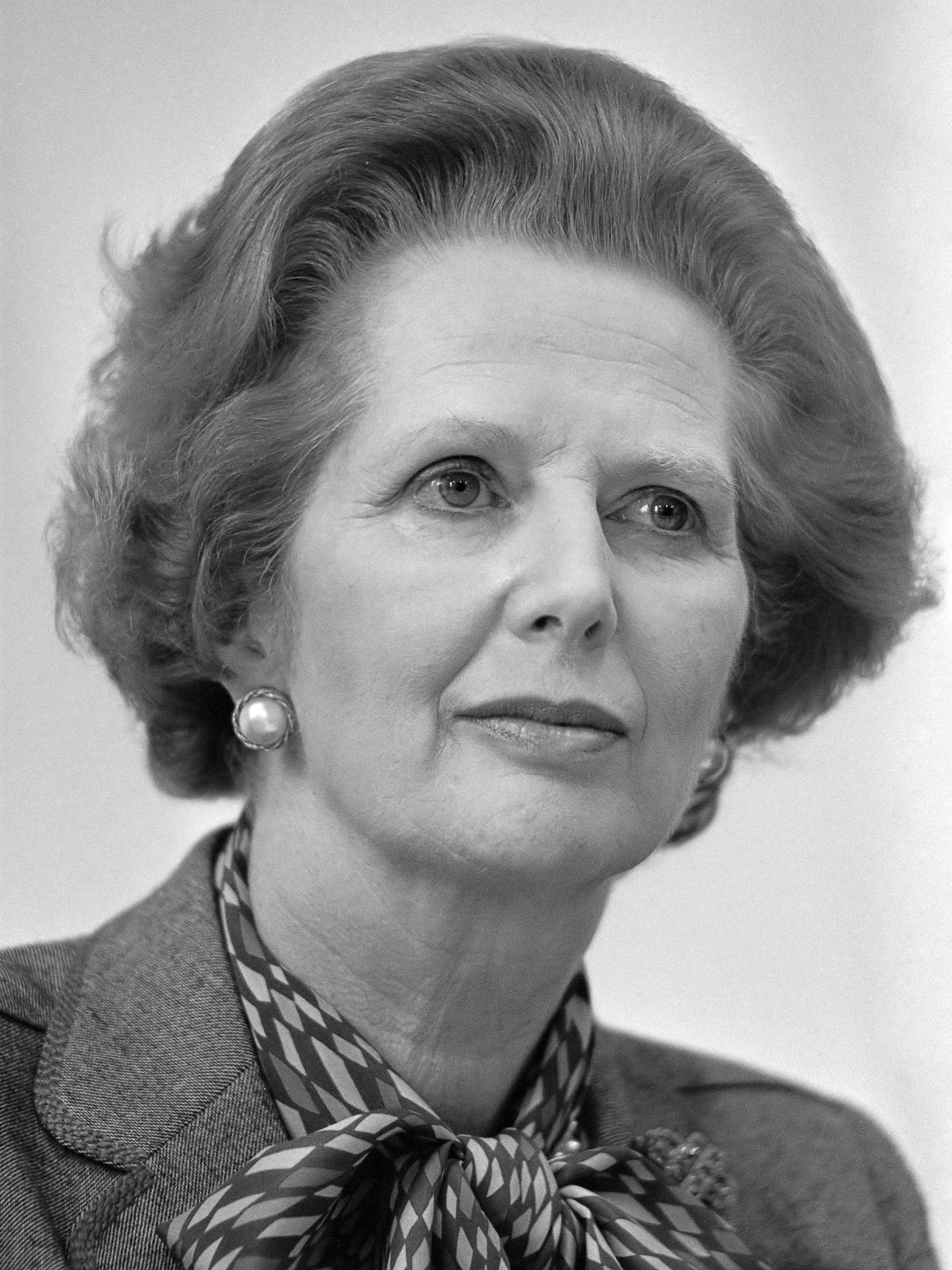

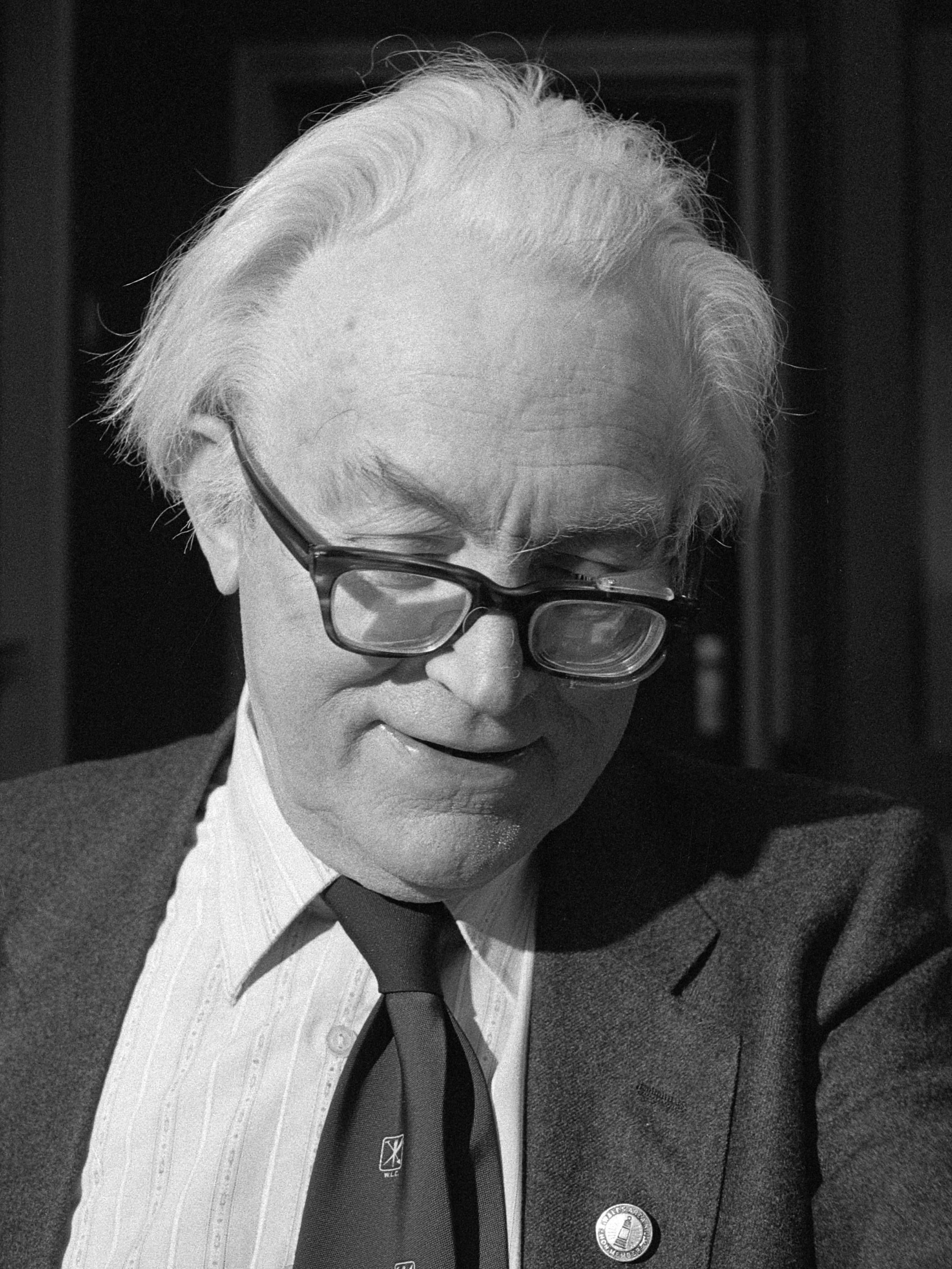

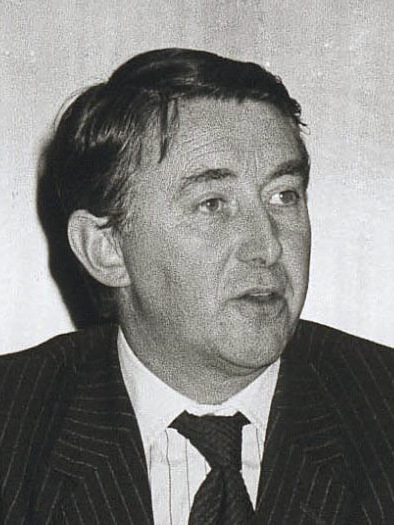

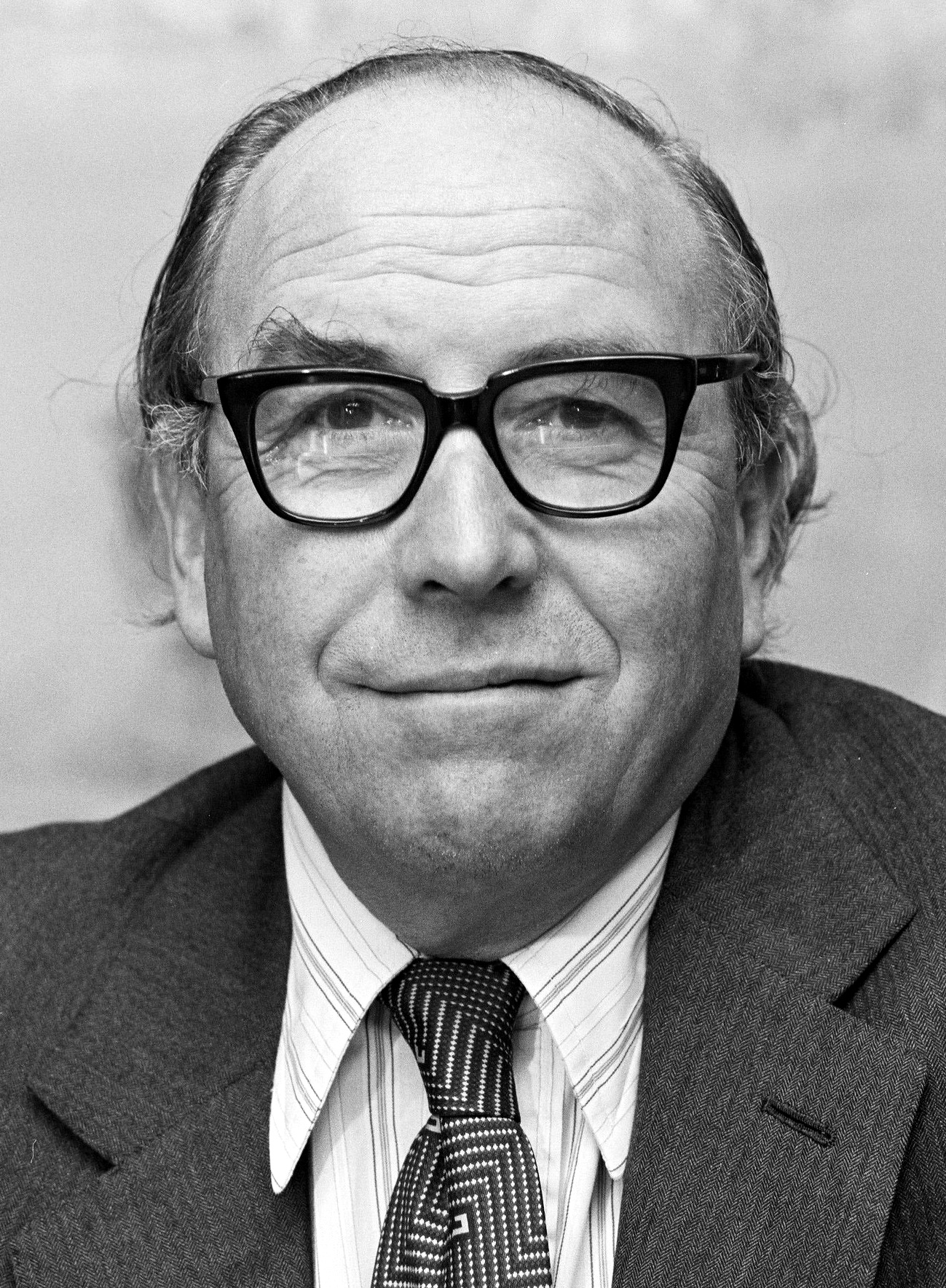
	First party	Second party	Third party
Leader	Margaret Thatcher	Michael Foot	David Steel (Lib.); Roy Jenkins (SDP)
Party	Conservative	Labour	Alliance
Leader since	11 February 1975	10 November 1980	7 July 1976 / 7 July 1982
Leader's seat	Finchley	Blaenau Gwent (Note: Represented Ebbw Vale prior to dissolution. Blaenau Gwent was one of the two successor seats.)	Tweeddale, Ettrick and Lauderdale (Note: Represented Roxburgh, Selkirk and Peebles prior to dissolution. Tweeddale, Ettrick and Lauderdale was one of the two successor seats.) / Glasgow Hillhead
Last election	339 seats, 43.9%	269 seats, 36.9%	11 seats, 13.8% (Note: Results for the Liberals only. The SDP did not contest)
Seats before	359†	261†	9
Seats won	397	209 (Note: Figure includes Speaker of the House of Commons George Thomas in Cardiff West.)	23†
Seat change	▲38*	▼52*	▲14*
Popular vote	13,012,316	8,456,934	7,780,949
Percentage	42.4%	27.6%	25.4%
Swing	▼1.5 pp	▼9.3 pp	▲11.6 pp
- Colours denote the winning party—as shown in § Results * Indicates boundary change, so this is a nominal figure.^{†} Notional 1979 results on new boundaries.

- Composition of the House of Commons after the election
Prime Minister before election
Margaret Thatcher
Conservative
Prime Minister after election
Margaret Thatcher
Conservative

A general election was held in the United Kingdom on Thursday 9 June 1983. The governing Conservative Party, under the leadership of Margaret Thatcher, won a landslide victory with a majority of 144 seats. It was the most decisive election result since the Labour Party won a 146-seat majority in 1945 and was the first of two consecutive landslides for the Conservatives.

Thatcher's first term as Prime Minister had not been an easy time. Unemployment increased during the first three years of her premiership and the economy went through a recession, resulting in the Conservatives trailing in virtually every poll from 1979 to 1981. However, Thatcher's decisive leadership in the Falklands War had led to a British victory and a recovery of her personal and the government's popularity in 1982, and economic growth had simultaneously resumed.

By the time Thatcher called the election in May 1983, opinion polls pointed to a Conservative victory, with most national newspapers backing the re-election of the Conservative government. The resulting win earned the Conservatives their biggest parliamentary majority of the post-war era, and their second-biggest majority as a majority government, behind only the 1924 general election (they earned even more seats in the 1931 general election, but were part of the National Government).

The Labour Party had been led by Michael Foot since the resignation of former Prime Minister James Callaghan as Leader of the Labour Party in 1980. Foot's leadership had resulted in Labour moving significantly more to the left, prompting several moderates from the right-wing of the party to defect from Labour to form the Social Democratic Party (SDP), which then formed the SDP–Liberal Alliance with the existing Liberal Party. Labour was further harmed by its promise to withdraw from the European Economic Community, which alienated Pro-European groups.

The opposition vote split almost evenly between the Alliance and Labour. With its worst electoral performance since 1931, the Labour vote fell by over 3,000,000 votes from 1979, accounting for both a national swing of almost 4% towards the Conservatives and their larger parliamentary majority of 144 seats, even though the Conservatives' total vote fell by almost 700,000. This was the last general election until 2015 in which a governing party increased its number of seats.

The Alliance finished in third place but came within 700,000 votes of out-polling Labour; by gaining 25.4% of the vote it won the largest percentage for any third party since 1923. Despite this, it won only 23 seats, whereas Labour won 209. The Liberals argued that a proportional electoral system would have given them a more representative number of MPs. Changing the electoral system from First-Past-The-Post had been a long-running campaign plank of the Liberal Party and would later be adopted by its successor, the Liberal Democrats.

The election night was broadcast live on the BBC and was presented by David Dimbleby, Sir Robin Day and Peter Snow. It was also broadcast on ITV and presented by Alastair Burnet, Peter Sissons and Martyn Lewis.

Three future leaders of the Labour Party were first elected to Parliament at this election: Tony Blair (1994–2007), Gordon Brown (2007–2010) and Jeremy Corbyn (2015–2020). In addition, two future Leaders of the Liberal Democrats, Paddy Ashdown and Charles Kennedy, were first elected. Michael Howard, who later served the Conservatives as Home Secretary in government and as party leader from 2003 to 2005, was also first elected to Parliament in 1983.

At the same time, a number of prominent Members of Parliament stepped aside or lost their seats. Former Labour Prime Minister Harold Wilson stood down from Parliament after 38 years, while the Alliance's Shirley Williams and Bill Pitt lost their seats only a short time after having won them. Joan Lestor and Tony Benn as well as former Liberal leader Jo Grimond and Speaker of the House of Commons and former Labour Cabinet Minister George Thomas also departed from Parliament at this election, although Benn would return after winning a by-election in Chesterfield the following year, and Lestor returned to Parliament after winning a seat at the next general election in 1987.

== Background and campaign ==
Michael Foot was elected leader of the Labour Party at the end of 1980, replacing James Callaghan. The election of Foot signalled that the core of the party was swinging to the left and the move exacerbated divisions within the party. During 1981, a group of senior figures including Roy Jenkins, David Owen, Bill Rodgers and Shirley Williams left Labour to found the Social Democratic Party (SDP). The SDP agreed to a pact with the Liberals for the 1983 election and stood as "The Alliance". For a while the Alliance topped the opinion polls and looked capable of achieving their goal of forming a coalition government at the next general election, but the success of the Falklands campaign in 1982 saw the political tide turn in favour of the Conservative government.

The election did not have to be held until 1984. Although political circumstances were clearly favourable for the government and opposition parties anticipated that Mrs Thatcher would go to the country in June, earlier in 1983 the Conservatives were split on the timing of the election. One faction favoured a June election, but another group wanted to wait until October before going to the country, while some within the Party even advocated delaying the contest until 1984. Supporters of waiting to a later time to hold an election included Thatcher's deputy and Home Secretary William Whitelaw and John Biffen who was then serving as Leader of the House of Commons. On 27 April it was reported that all the Conservative party's regional agents had unanimously expressed a preference to Thatcher for a June election, although some members of her cabinet were advising her to wait until October. On 8 May senior Conservatives met at Chequers and agreed to go to the country on 9 June. The election was formally called the next day and Parliament was dissolved on 13 May for a four-week official election campaign.

The campaign displayed the huge divisions between the two major parties. Thatcher had been highly unpopular during her first two years in office until the swift and decisive victory in the Falklands War, coupled with an improving economy, considerably raised her standings in the polls. The Conservatives' key issues included reducing unemployment (which had increased from 1.5 million in 1979 to more than 3 million by 1982), continuing economic growth following the recent recession, and defence. Labour's campaign manifesto involved leaving the European Economic Community, abolishing the House of Lords, abandoning the United Kingdom's nuclear deterrent by cancelling Trident and removing cruise missiles — a programme dubbed by Labour MP Gerald Kaufman "the longest suicide note in history"; "Although, at barely 37 pages, it only seemed interminable", noted Roy Hattersley. Pro-Labour political journalist Michael White, writing in The Guardian, commented: "There was something magnificently brave about Michael Foot's campaign but it was like the Battle of the Somme."

The Alliance had had a setback ahead of the campaign at the Darlington by-election in March. The contest was one that had looked promising ground for the SDP, but despite heavily campaigning in the Labour-held seat, the SDP candidate, who struggled when interviewed for television by Vincent Hanna finished a poor third, which stalled the momentum of the Alliance. During the campaign, on Sunday 29 May, David Steel held a meeting with Jenkins and other Alliance leaders at his Ettrickbridge home. Steel, who polls showed was more popular proposed that Jenkins take a lower profile and that Steel take over as leader of the campaign. Jenkins rejected Steel's view and remained "Prime Minister designate", but Steel did have a heightened role on television for the last 10 days of the election campaign. According to Steve Richards the meeting meant Jenkins' "confidence was undermined and he staggered to the finishing line with less verve than he had displayed in the early days of the SDP" and showed little sign of his earlier "exuberance".

== Notional election, 1979 ==
Following boundary changes in 1983, the BBC and ITN (Independent Television News) co-produced a calculation of how the 1979 general election would have gone if fought on the new 1983 boundaries. The following table shows the effects of the boundary changes on the House of Commons:

UK General Election 1979
Party	Seats	Gains	Losses	Net gain/loss	Seats %	Votes %	Votes	+/−
Conservative	359			+20	55	44.9	13,703,429	
Labour	261			−8	40	37.7	11,512,877	
Liberal	9			−2	1	14.2	4,324,936	
SNP	2			0	0	1.6	497,128	
Plaid Cymru	2			0	0	0.4	135,241	
Other parties	17			+5	3	3.4	1,063,263	

In effect, the Conservative Party had won 20 more seats under the new boundaries than it had in the previous election, with Labour and the Liberal Party suffering starting from fewer seats notionally. The Scottish National Party and Plaid Cymru saw no change in terms of seats.

However, amongst the largest changes came from Northern Ireland increasing having it number of seats increased from 12 to 17. In effect, this placed the Ulster Unionist Party at 9 notional seats compared to the 5 it had won in the previous election, with the Social Democratic and Labour Party on 2 seats where it had only held 1, with the Independent Unionist technically holding 2 seats. The Democratic Unionist Party, however, would have held 2 sets instead of its three. Finally, the United Ulster Unionist Party would have notionally held its 1 seat, as would have Independent Republican Frank Maguire. These were the changes of the 12 to 17 seats which represented Northern Ireland, although not explicitly shown in the BBC/ITN release.

The Electoral Calculus notional calculation placed each parties' seats as follows:

Notional 1979 results on 1983 boundaries
Party	1979 MPs		
Party	Actual	Notional	Difference
Conservative	339	359	▲20
Labour	269	261	▼8
Liberal	11	9	▼2
UUP	5	9	▲4
DUP	3	2	▼1
SNP	2	2	Steady
Plaid Cymru	2	2	Steady
SDLP	1	2	▲1
Ind. Unionist	1	2	▲1
UUUP	1	1	Steady
Ind. Republican	1	1	Steady

== Timeline ==
The Prime Minister Margaret Thatcher visited Buckingham Palace on the afternoon of 9 May and asked the Queen to dissolve Parliament on 13 May, announcing that the election would be held on 9 June. The key dates were as follows:

Friday 13 May	Dissolution of the 48th Parliament and campaigning officially begins
Monday 23 May	Last day to file nomination papers; 2,579 candidates enter
Wednesday 8 June	Campaigning officially ends
Thursday 9 June	Polling day
Friday 10 June	The Conservative Party wins with a majority of 144 to retain power
Wednesday 15 June	49th Parliament assembles
Wednesday 22 June	State Opening of Parliament

== Results ==
The election saw the Conservatives win a landslide victory, improving on their 1979 result and achieving their best results since 1935. Although there was a slight drop in their share of the vote, they made significant gains at the expense of Labour. The Tories have yet to match their 1983 seat total in any subsequent general election, although they recorded a higher share of the popular vote in 2019.

The night was a disaster for the Labour Party; their share of the vote fell by over 9%, which meant they were only 700,000 votes ahead of the newly formed third party, the SDP–Liberal Alliance. The massive increase of support for the Alliance at the expense of Labour meant that, in many seats, the collapse in the Labour vote allowed the Conservatives to gain. Despite winning over 25% of the national vote, the Alliance got fewer than 4% of seats, 186 fewer than Labour. The most significant Labour loss of the night was Tony Benn, who was defeated in the revived Bristol East seat. SDP President Shirley Williams, then a prominent leader in the Social Democratic Party, lost her Crosby seat which she had won in a by-election in 1981. Bill Rodgers, another leading figure in the Alliance (like Williams, one of the "Gang of Four") also failed to win his old seat that he previously held as a Labour MP.

In Scotland, both Labour and the Conservatives sustained modest losses to the Alliance. Labour remained by far the largest party, with 41 seats to 21 for the Scottish Conservatives. The Scottish Conservatives have been unable to match their 1983 Westminster seat total since, although they did record a slightly larger share of the Scottish vote in 2017, by which time the Scottish National Party had become the dominant party in Scotland with the Conservatives being the largest unionist party, with 13 seats won in 2017; their strongest performance in Scotland in 34 years.

On a nationwide basis, the 1983 UK general election was the worst result in Labour's modern history until the 2019 general election, in terms of seats won. The result in 1983 remains the worst-ever modern performance for Labour in England.

=== Summary of seats returned ===
Party	Leader	MPs		Aggregate votes	
Party	Leader		Of total		Of total
Conservative and Unionist Party	Margaret Thatcher	397	61.1%	13,012,316	42.4%
Labour Party	Michael Foot	209 (Note: Includes 7 Co-operative Party MP, as part of the Labour-Co-op alliance.)	32.2%	8,456,934	27.6%
SDP–Liberal Alliance	—N/a	23	3.5%	7,780,949	25.4%
Liberal Party	David Steel	17	2.6%	4,210,115	13.7%
Social Democratic Party	Roy Jenkins	6	0.9%	3,570,834	11.6%
Ulster Unionist Party	James Molyneaux	11	1.7%	259,952	0.8%
Democratic Unionist Party	Ian Paisley	3	0.5%	152,749	0.5%
Scottish National Party	Gordon Wilson	2	0.3%	331,975	1.1%
Plaid Cymru	Dafydd Wigley	2	0.3%	125,309	0.4%
Social Democratic and Labour Party	John Hume	1	0.2%	137,012	0.4%
Sinn Féin	Ruairí Ó Brádaigh	1	0.2%	102,701	0.3%
Ulster Popular Unionist Party	James Kilfedder	1	0.2%	22,861	0.1%

=== Full results ===

Results of the June 1983 general election to the House of Commons of the United Kingdom
Party	Leader	Candidates	MPs					Aggregate votes		
Party	Leader	Candidates	Total	Gains	Losses	Net	Of total (%)	Total	Of total (%)	Change (%)
Conservative	Margaret; Thatcher	633	397	48	10	▲38	61.1	13,012,316	42.4	▼1.5
Labour	Michael; Foot	633 (Note: Includes 17 Co-operative Party candidates, as part of the Labour-Co-op alliance.)	209 (Note: Includes 7 Co-operative Party MPs, as part of the Labour-Co-op alliance.)	4	56	▼52 (Note: Includes ▼10 Co-operative Party MPs, as part of the Labour-Co-op alliance.)	32.2 (Note: Includes 1.1% for the Co-operative Party, as part of the Labour-Co-op alliance.)	8,456,934 (Note: Includes 299,080 for the Co-operative Party, as part of the Labour-Co-op alliance.)	27.6 (Note: Includes 1.0% for the Co-operative Party, as part of the Labour-Co-op alliance.)	▼9.3 (Note: Includes ▼0.6% for the Co-operative Party, as part of the Labour-Co-op alliance.)
SDP–Liberal; Alliance	—N/a	633	23	New		▲14	3.5	7,780,949	25.4	New
Liberal	David; Steel	322	17	8	0	▲8	2.6	4,210,115	13.7	▼0.1
SDP	Roy; Jenkins	311	6	New		▲6	0.9	3,570,834	11.6	New
SNP	Gordon; Wilson	72	2	0	0	Steady	0.3	331,975	1.1	▼0.5
UUP	James; Molyneaux	16	11	3	1	▲2	1.7	259,952	0.8	Steady
DUP	Ian; Paisley	14	3	2	1	▲1	0.5	152,749	0.5	▲0.3
SDLP	John; Hume	17	1 (Note: Leader John Hume in the new seat of Foyle was a notional 'hold' on the new boundaries compared with 1979.)	0	1 (Note: Gerry Fitt in Belfast West.)	▼1	0.2	137,012	0.4	Steady
Plaid Cymru	Dafydd; Wigley	38	2	0	0	Steady	0.3	125,309	0.4	Steady
Sinn Féin	Ruairí Ó Brádaigh	14	1 (Note: Gerry Adams in Belfast West.)	Did not stand in 1979		▲1	0.2	102,701	0.3	—N/a
Alliance	Oliver; Napier	12	0	0	0	Steady	—	61,275	0.2	▼0.1
Ecology	Multiple; Leaders	109	0	0	0	Steady	—	54,299	0.2	▲0.1
Independent	—N/a	85 (Note: Includes official Liberal candidates who were not given national Alliance endorsement against SDP candidates in three constituencies: Liverpool Broadgreen, Hackney South and Shoreditch, and Hammersmith.)	0	0	0	Steady	—	35,482	0.1	▲0.1
National; Front	Andrew; Brons	60	0	0	0	Steady	—	27,065	0.1	▼0.5
UPUP	James; Kilfedder	1	1 (Note: James Kilfedder in North Down.)	New		▲1	0.2	22,861	0.1	New
Independent; Labour	—N/a	8	0	0	0	Steady	—	17,077	0.1	Steady
Workers' Party	Tomás; Mac Giolla	14	0	0	0	Steady	—	14,650	0.0	Steady
BNP	John; Tyndall	54	0	New			—	14,621	0.0	New
Independent; Conservative	—N/a	11	0	0	0	Steady	—	13,086	0.1	Steady
Communist	Gordon; McLennan	35	0	0	0	Steady	—	11,606	0.0	▼0.1
Independent; Socialist	—N/a	1 (Note: Candidate Gerry Fitt in Belfast West.)	0	New			—	10,326	0.0	New
Workers; Revolutionary	Michael; Banda	21	0	0	0	Steady	—	3,798	0.0	Steady
Monster Raving Loony	David; Sutch	12 (Note: Figure includes two candidates who simply stood as 'Loony Society' candidates in Dulwich and Kingston-upon-Thames.)	0	New			—	3,623	0.0	New
Pro-Corporal; Punishment	—N/a	3	0	New			—	2,113	0.0	New
Wessex Regionalists	Alexander; Thynn	10	0	0	0	Steady	—	1,750	0.0	Steady
Anti-Common; Market	—N/a	3	0	0	0	Steady	—	1,177	0.0	Steady
Mebyon; Kernow	Richard; Jenkin	2	0	0	0	Steady	—	1,151	0.0	Steady
Independent; DUP	—N/a	1 (Note: Candidate William Campbell Gault stood in Belfast North.)	0	New			—	1,134	0.0	New
Independent; Communist	—N/a	1 (Note: Candidate Ronald Parkinson stood in Hertsmere.)	0	Did not stand in 1979			—	1,116	0.0	—N/a
Associates with Licences	—N/a	4	0	New			—	934	0.0	New
Nationalist Party	Andrew; Fountaine	5	0	New			—	874	0.0	New
Independent; Liberal	—N/a	2	0	New			—	656	0.0	New
Labour and Trade Union	Peter; Hadden	1 (Note: Candidate Frances Cullen stood in Belfast East.)	0	New			—	584	0.0	New
Revolutionary Communist	Frank; Furedi	3	0	New			—	581	0.0	New
Spare the Earth	—N/a	1 (Note: Candidate Thomas Layton stood in Hove.)	0	New			—	524	0.0	New
Women for Life on Earth	—N/a	1 (Note: Candidate R. Johnson stood in Henley.)	0	New			—	517	0.0	New
National; Labour	—N/a	1	0	Did not stand in 1979			—	456	0.0	New
Nobody; Party	—N/a	1	0	New			—	386	0.0	New
Fancy Dress	John; Crockford	1	0	0	0	Steady	—	374	0.0	Steady
Cornish Nationalist	James; Whetter	1	0	0	0	Steady	—	364	0.0	Steady
Anti- Deportation	—N/a	1	0	New			—	355	0.0	New
Multi-Racial; Party	—N/a	1	0	New			—	327	0.0	New
FTACMP; Candidate	—N/a	1	0	New			—	325	0.0	New
Freedom; Party	—N/a	1	0	New			—	324	0.0	New
Progressive; Liberal	—N/a	1	0	New			—	319	0.0	New
Freddie's Alternative; Medicine	—N/a	1	0	New			—	318	0.0	New
Fellowship	Ronald; Mallone	1	0	0	0	Steady	—	242	0.0	Steady
Nationalist (Cantebury)	—N/a	1	0	New			—	226	0.0	New
Prosperity for All	—N/a	1	0	New			—	221	0.0	New
One-nation; Conservative	—N/a	1	0	New			—	213	0.0	New
Gizza; Job	—N/a	1	0	New			—	212	0.0	New
Isle of Wight; Residents	—N/a	1	0	New			—	208	0.0	New
Unemployment; Party	—N/a	1	0	New			—	204	0.0	New
Modern; Democratic	—N/a	1	0	New			—	189	0.0	New
Servicemen and Citizen	—N/a	1	0	New			—	177	0.0	New
Socialist (GB)	Collective; Leadership	2	0	0	0	Steady	—	173	0.0	Steady
Assassin's; Bullet	—N/a	1	0	New			—	173	0.0	New
Traditional; English Food	—N/a	1	0	New			—	172	0.0	New
Freedom from World Domination	—N/a	1	0	New			—	165	0.0	New
Socialist; Workers	—N/a	1 (Note: Candidate Dave Roberts stood in Leicester South under the label of 'Workers Party for a Workers State', and was supported by the Socialist Workers Party and Indian Workers' Association.)	0	New			—	161	0.0	New
Christian; Democrat	—N/a	1	0	New			—	159	0.0	New
New Britain	Dennis; Delderfield	1	0	0	0	Steady	—	154	0.0	Steady
Computer; Democrat	—N/a	1	0	New			—	150	0.0	New
Pro-Nuclear; War Gay Rights	—N/a	1	0	New			—	147	0.0	New
Ethnic; Minority	—N/a	1	0	New			—	146	0.0	New
Animal Rights Anti-Vivisection	—N/a	1	0	New			—	139	0.0	New
Independent; For Referendum	—N/a	1	0	New			—	135	0.0	New
Anti- Courription	—N/a	1	0	New			—	128	0.0	New
Against Cuts to Education	—N/a	1	0	New			—	123	0.0	New
Common Market; Party	—N/a	1	0	New			—	113	0.0	New
Justice for Divorced Fathers	—N/a	1	0	New			—	113	0.0	New
Islington and Finsbury Party	—N/a	1	0	New			—	102	0.0	New
Black and White Unity	—N/a	1	0	New			—	86	0.0	New
Ban Licensing; Law Society	—N/a	1	0	New			—	75	0.0	New
World; Government	—N/a	1	0	New			—	67	0.0	New
New Agenda	Proinsias; De Rossa	1	0	New			—	59	0.0	New
Rail not Motorway	—N/a	1	0	New			—	42	0.0	New
Ind. Workers; Revolutionary	—N/a	1 (Note: The candidate in Vauxhall is not regarded in the list of 21 candidates or total party votes for the Workers Revolutionary Party.)	0	New			—	38	0.0	New
Law and Order for Gotham	—N/a	1	0	New			—	37	0.0	New
Anti- Censorship	—N/a	1	0	New			—	28	0.0	New
Community; Party	—N/a	1	0	0	0	Steady	—	22	0.0	Steady
Belgrano; Blood-Hunger	—N/a	1	0	New			—	13	0.0	New
Other non-contested		0	0	—N/a		▼4 (Note: 2 Independent Unionist seats: James Kilfedder retained North Down but with his own party; the new seat of Strangford was a notional seat for Independent Unionist.; 1 Independent Republican seat of Fermanagh and South Tyrone.; 1 United Ulster Unionist Party seat of Mid Ulster.)	—	0	0.0	—N/a
Blank and invalid votes								51,104	—	—
Total		2,578	650			0	100.0	30,671,137 (Note: All valid votes excluding spoiled votes.)	100.0	0.0
Registered voters, and turnout								42,192,999	72.7	▼3.3

=== Votes summary ===
Seats won in the election (outer ring) against number of votes (inner ring)

Popular vote
Conservative	42.43%
Labour	27.57%
SDP–Liberal	25.37%
Others	4.63%

=== Seats summary ===
Parliamentary seats
Conservative	61.08%
Labour	32.15%
SDP–Liberal	3.54%
Others	3.23%

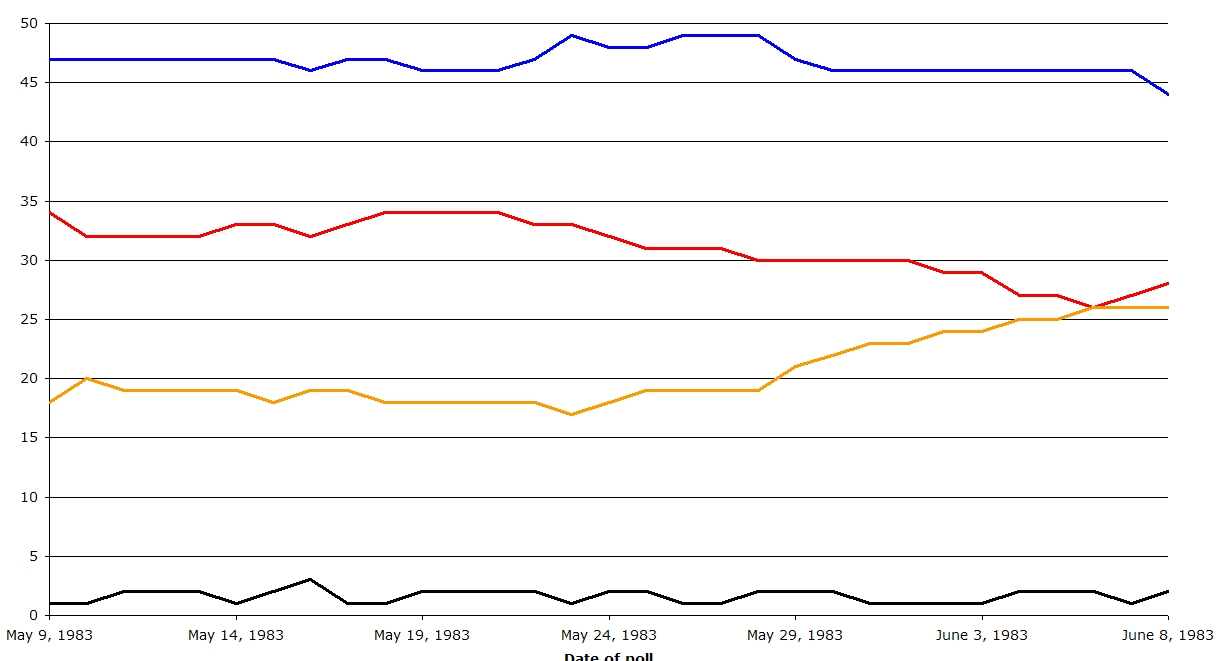
Data from Guardian daily polls published in The Guardian between May and June 1983. Colour key:
- Conservative
- Labour
- Alliance
- Others
The disproportionality of the House of Commons in the 1983 election was "20.62" according to the Gallagher Index, mainly between the Conservatives and the Alliance.

=== Results by voter characteristics ===
Ethnic group voting intention
Ethnic group	Party			
Ethnic group	Labour	Conservative	SDP/Lib	Other
Ethnic minority (non-White)	83%	7%	n/a	10%
Asian	81%	9%	9%	n/a
Afro-Caribbean	88%	7%	5%	n/a

== Incumbents defeated ==
Party	Name	Constituency	Office held whilst in Parliament	Year elected	Defeated by	Party
Labour	Tony Benn	Bristol South East (contested Bristol East)	Secretary of State for Energy (1975–1979)	1950 (Note: Benn did not serve during his Viscountcy between 1960 and 1963.)	Jonathan Sayeed	Conservative
Labour	Albert Booth	Barrow and Furness	Secretary of State for Employment (1976–1979)	1966	Cecil Franks	Conservative
Labour	Arthur Davidson	Accrington (contested Hyndburn)	Shadow Attorney General (1982–1983)	1966	Ken Hargreaves	Conservative
Labour	Neil Carmichael	Glasgow Kelvingrove (contested Glasgow Hillhead)	Parliamentary Under-Secretary at the Department of Industry (1975–1976)	1962	Roy Jenkins MP	SDP
Labour	Bob Cryer	Keighley		1974	Gary Waller	Conservative
Labour	Joseph Dean	Leeds West	Lord Commissioner of the Treasury (1978–1979)	1974	Michael Meadowcroft	Liberal
Labour	David Ennals	Norwich North	Secretary of State for Social Services (1976–1979)	1974	Patrick Thompson	Conservative
Labour	John Garrett	Norwich South		1974	John Powley	Conservative
Labour	Ted Graham	Edmonton	Lord Commissioner of the Treasury (1976–1979)	1974	Ian Twinn	Conservative
Labour	William Homewood	Kettering (contested Corby)		1979	William Powell	Conservative
Labour	Frank Hooley	Sheffield Heeley (contested Stratford-on-Avon)		1966	Alan Howarth	Conservative
Labour	Russell Kerr	Feltham and Heston		1966	Patrick Ground	Conservative
Labour	Joan Lestor	Eton and Slough (contested Slough)	Chair of the Labour Party (1977–78)	1966	John Watts	Conservative
Labour	Alex Lyon	York		1966	Conal Gregory	Conservative
Labour	Jim Marshall	Leicester South		1974	Derek Spencer	Conservative
Labour	Roland Moyle	Lewisham East	Minister of State for Health (1976–1979)	1966	Colin Moynihan	Conservative
Labour	Stan Newens	Harlow		1974	Jerry Hayes	Conservative
Labour	Oswald O'Brien	Darlington		1983	Michael Fallon	Conservative
Labour	Christopher Price	Lewisham West		1974	John Maples	Conservative
Labour	Gwilym Roberts	Cannock (contested Cannock and Burntwood)		1974	Gerald Howarth	Conservative
Labour	John Sever	Birmingham Ladywood, contested (Meriden)		1977	Iain Mills	Conservative
Labour	John Spellar	Birmingham Northfield		1982	Roger Douglas King	Conservative
Labour	David Stoddart	Swindon	Lord Commissioner of the Treasury (1975–1978)	1970	Simon Coombs	Conservative
Labour	Shirley Summerskill	Halifax	Under-Secretary of State for the Home Department (1976–1979)	1964	Roy Galley	Conservative
Labour	Ann Taylor	Bolton West (contested Bolton North East)		1974	Peter Thurnham	Conservative
Labour	John Tilley	Lambeth Central (contested Southwark and Bermondsey)		1978	Simon Hughes MP	Liberal
Labour	Frank White	Bury and Radcliffe (contested Bury North)		1974	Alistair Burt	Conservative
Labour	Phillip Whitehead	Derby North		1970	Greg Knight	Conservative
Labour	William Whitlock	Nottingham North	Under-Secretary of State for Foreign Affairs (1968–1969)	1959	Richard Ottaway	Conservative
Labour	Kenneth Woolmer	Batley and Morley (contested Batley and Spen)		1979	Elizabeth Peacock	Conservative
SDP	Tom Bradley	Leicester East		1962	Peter Bruinvels	Conservative
SDP	Christopher Brocklebank-Fowler	North West Norfolk		1970	Henry Bellingham	Conservative
SDP	Ronald Brown	Hackney South and Shoreditch		1964	Brian Sedgemore	Labour
SDP	Richard Crawshaw	Liverpool Toxteth (contested Liverpool Broadgreen)	Second Deputy Chairman of Ways and Means (1979–1981)	1964	Terry Fields	Labour
SDP	George Cunningham	Islington South and Finsbury		1970	Chris Smith	Labour
SDP	Tom Ellis	Wrexham (contested Clwyd South West)		1970	Robert Harvey	Conservative
SDP	David Ginsburg	Dewsbury		1959	John Whitfield	Conservative
SDP	John Grant	Islington Central (contested Islington North)	Under-Secretary of State for Employment (1976–1979)	1970	Jeremy Corbyn	Labour
SDP	John Horam	Gateshead West (contested Newcastle upon Tyne Central)	Parliamentary Under-Secretary of State for Transport (1976–1979)	1970	Piers Merchant	Conservative
SDP	Ednyfed Hudson Davies	Caerphilly (contested Basingstoke)		1979	Andrew Hunter	Conservative
SDP	Edward Lyons	Bradford West		1966	Max Madden	Labour
SDP	Dickson Mabon	Greenock and Port Glasgow (contested Inverclyde)	Minister for Energy (1976–1979)	1955	Anna McCurley	Conservative
SDP	Tom McNally	Stockport South (contested Stockport)		1979	Anthony Favell	Conservative
SDP	Bryan Magee	Leyton		1974	Harry Cohen	Labour
SDP	Bob Mitchell	Southampton Itchen		1971	Christopher Chope	Conservative
SDP	Eric Ogden	Liverpool West Derby		1964	Bob Wareing	Labour
SDP	William Rodgers	Stockton-on-Tees (contested Stockton North)	Secretary of State for Transport (1976–1979)	1962	Frank Cook	Labour
SDP	John Roper	Farnworth (contested Worsley)	SDP Chief Whip (1981–83)	1970	Terry Lewis	Labour
SDP	Neville Sandelson	Hayes and Harlington		1971	Terry Dicks	Conservative
SDP	Jeffrey Thomas	Abertillery (contested Cardiff West)		1970	Stefan Terlezki	Conservative
SDP	Michael Thomas	Newcastle upon Tyne East		1974	Nick Brown	Labour
SDP	James Wellbeloved	Erith and Crayford		1965	David Evennett	Conservative
SDP	Shirley Williams	Crosby (elected as SDP)	Secretary of State for Education and Science (1976–1979)	1981	Malcolm Thornton	Conservative
Conservative	David Myles	Banffshire (contested Orkney and Shetland)		1979	Jim Wallace	Liberal
Conservative	Iain Sproat	Aberdeen South (contested Roxburgh and Berwickshire)		1970	Archy Kirkwood	Liberal
Conservative	Delwyn Williams	Montgomeryshire		1979	Alex Carlile	Liberal
Conservative	Hamish Gray	Ross and Cromarty (contested Ross, Cromarty and Skye)	Minister of State for Energy (1979–1983)	1970	Charles Kennedy	SDP
Independent	Ben Ford	Bradford North		1964	Geoffrey Lawler	Conservative
Independent	Arthur Lewis	Newham North West		1945	Tony Banks	Labour
Independent	Michael O'Halloran	Islington North		1969	Jeremy Corbyn	Labour
Independent	Gerry Fitt	Belfast West		1966	Gerry Adams	Sinn Féin
Sinn Féin	Owen Carron	Fermanagh and South Tyrone		1981	Ken Maginnis	UUP
Liberal	Bill Pitt	Croydon North West		1981	Humfrey Malins	Conservative

== Opinion polls ==
Conservative Labour SDP–Liberal Alliance

== See also ==
- List of MPs elected in the 1983 United Kingdom general election
- 1983 United Kingdom general election in England
- 1983 United Kingdom general election in Scotland
- 1983 United Kingdom general election in Wales
- 1983 United Kingdom general election in Northern Ireland
- 1983 United Kingdom local elections

== Manifestos ==
- The Challenge of Our Times, 1983 Conservative Party manifesto
- The New Hope for Britain, 1983 Labour Party manifesto
- Working Together for Britain, 1983 SDP–Liberal Alliance manifesto
