= 1982 Social Democratic Party leadership election =

1982 SDP leadership election
| 2 July 1982 | 1988 (SLD) → |
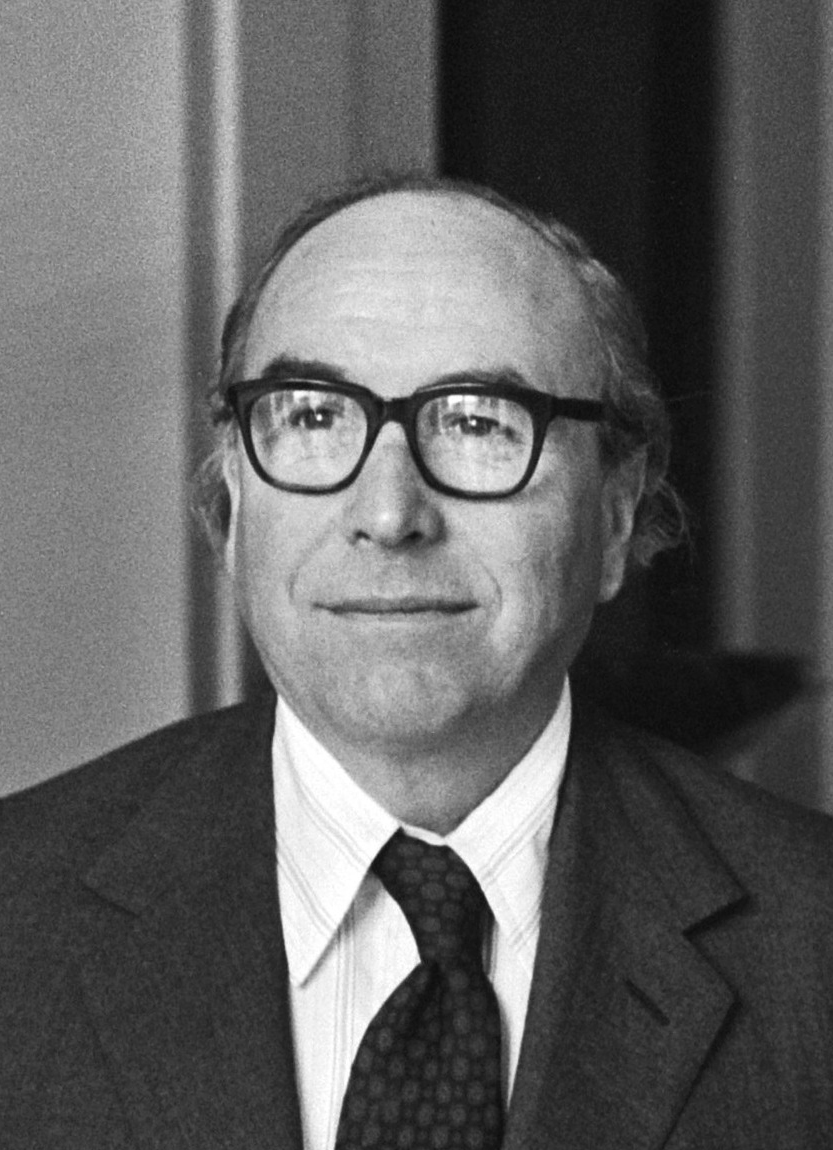

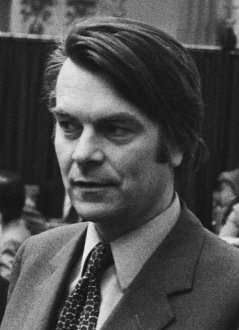
| Candidate | Roy Jenkins | David Owen |
| Popular vote | 26,256 | 20,864 |
| Percentage | 55.7 | 44.3 |
Elected Leader
Roy Jenkins

The 1982 Social Democratic Party leadership election was called following the formation of the Social Democratic Party (SDP). The party had been founded by the Gang of Four the previous year and had rapidly built up its membership, but lacked a formal leadership structure. Each of the Gang of Four was regarded as coequal leader.

== Method of election ==
One of the first disputes within the party was over the method of election for the leadership. Shirley Williams and David Owen strongly believed that the party should be committed to 'One Member, One Vote' and therefore the Leader should be elected by the whole membership. Roy Jenkins, however, believed that the Leader should be elected in a ballot of SDP Members of Parliament only. Ivor Crewe and Anthony King's book on the party points out that such a system would make his election as Leader much more likely. Bill Rodgers went along with Jenkins.

In autumn 1981, the SDP Steering Committee agreed (as suggested by Jenkins and Rodgers) to recommend to a constitutional conference that the Leader be elected by MPs, but that the ultimate decision on the mode of election would have to be endorsed by the membership. The conference, held in February 1982, decided to offer three options: election by the party membership, election by the MPs only, and a system in which the first leader would be elected by the membership but subsequent leaders by the MPs (on the assumption that there would be many more of them after the next general election). In the event, the membership decided to preserve their power over the election of the leader.

== Candidates ==
Roy Jenkins was unofficially regarded as the Leader of the SDP from the time of its foundation, as the most senior of the founding members. However, he was out of Parliament at the time, and despite his support, it was generally accepted in the party that the leader must be an MP. Fortunately for Jenkins, the Glasgow Hillhead constituency (which had already been assessed as a potential SDP seat) fell vacant in January 1982 and Jenkins won the by-election in March.

David Owen had been infuriated by the party even considering election by MPs only and therefore decided that either he or Williams were to challenge Jenkins for the leadership as early as November 1981. Williams privately informed Jenkins before polling day in Hillhead that she had decided not to stand and, on the day after the election, gave a press interview in which she described him as "the Alliance's natural leader". Owen continued to press Williams to run, as a result of which she issued a press statement on 18 May 1982 which read "I will not be standing for the leadership."

Jenkins' supporters tried to persuade Owen not to run in order to prevent the party from being divided, although at the back of their minds was the thought that Owen might be able to capitalise on his prominence during the Falklands War when he had frequently appeared in the media commentating as a former Foreign Secretary how he deterred a 1977 invasion plan by despatching some Royal Navy ships. Owen was undeterred and when Williams announced that she would not run, he immediately declared that he would. When nominations closed on 11 June, there were therefore two candidates.

== Campaign ==
Backstage negotiation at the time of the constitutional conference had agreed that, in the event of a contest, the candidates should not overtly campaign for the job, as it would increase divisions in the party. The candidates were practically united on issues of policy and therefore the differences between the two candidates were largely those of image and personality. The only significant policy issue which divided them was on relations with the Liberal Party. Jenkins wanted a very close alliance between the SDP and Liberals, and viewed the SDP as a means of levering more ex-Labour supporters into the political centre. Owen, by contrast, viewed the Alliance as a simple electoral pact in order to get the SDP established as a serious electoral force, and he absolutely ruled out the idea of unifying the two into an 'Alliance Party'.

Despite the agreement prohibiting campaigning, the candidates both took the opportunity to brief Lobby journalists against the other. Both candidates' supporters felt some degree of bitterness against the other.

== Endorsements ==
Jenkins and Owen were roughly evenly split among the parliamentary party for support, with Jenkins maintaining a slight edge. Of the SDP's twenty nine Members of Parliament, fifteen supported Jenkins (including Bill Rodgers) while thirteen supported Owen (including Shirley Williams). One (Michael O'Halloran) was uncommitted. Following below is a partial list of endorsers for each candidate:

=== Jenkins ===
- Bill Rodgers
- Dickson Mabon
- Ian Wrigglesworth
- Bruce Douglas-Mann
- Edward Lyons
- Jeffrey Thomas
- Robert Maclennan
- Tom Ellis
- Neville Sandelson
- John Horam
- Dick Taverne
- Colin Phipps
- Tom Bradley
- David Ginsburg
- Ednyfed Hudson Davies
- John Harris

=== Owen ===
- Shirley Williams
- John Cartwright
- Mike Thomas
- Bob Mitchell
- Bryan Magee
- Richard Crawshaw
- Eric Ogden
- Christopher Brocklebank-Fowler
- John Grant
- James Wellbeloved
- David Sainsbury
- Evan Luard
- George Brown

== Results ==
In the end, 75.6% of the membership returned their ballots, and the election proved a relatively close contest: Jenkins won with 55.7% of the vote. Owen accepted his defeat, and was appointed by Jenkins as Deputy Leader of the Parliamentary Party.

Jenkins remained in the post for only a year. In the 1983 General Election, the SDP–Liberal Alliance won 25.4% of the vote, but the Alliance were left holding only twenty three seats of which only six were held by the Social Democrats, and Owen announced that he would force another leadership election. Jenkins chose to step aside rather than contest the challenge.

| Candidate | Votes | % |
|---|---|---|
| Roy Jenkins ✓ | 26,256 | 55.7 |
| David Owen | 20,864 | 44.3 |

== Presidential election ==
Alongside the leadership election, there was a separate contest to become President of the Council of Social Democracy, an institution with representatives of every area party of the SDP, with responsibility for deliberating on, and adopting, policies. The President was also to sit on the party's National Committee. Three candidates stood. Two, Shirley Williams and Bill Rodgers, were members of the "Gang of Four" Labour Party politicians which had led the party's formation. The other candidate was Stephen Haseler, former joint secretary of the Social Democratic Alliance.

| Candidate | Votes | % |
|---|---|---|
| Shirley Williams ✓ | 19,006 | 65.9 |
| Bill Rodgers | 5,584 | 19.4 |
| Stephen Haseler | 4,255 | 14.8 |
