= List of United Kingdom by-elections (1979–2010) =

There were 131 parliamentary by-elections in the United Kingdom between the 1979 and 2010 general elections. In the list below, the names of the incumbent and victor and their respective parties are given. Where seats changed political party at the election, the result is highlighted: blue for a Conservative gain, red for a Labour gain, yellow for an SNP gain, orange for a Liberal, Social Democratic Party or Liberal Democrat gain and other colours for other gains.

== Resignations ==
Where the cause of by-election is given as "resignation" or "seeks re-election", this indicates that the incumbent was appointed on his or her own request to an "office of profit under the Crown", either the Steward of the Chiltern Hundreds or the Steward of the Manor of Northstead. Accepting an office of profit under the Crown vacates the member's seat. This process is used because members of the House of Commons are not technically permitted to resign. A member who resigns in this manner may stand for re-election.

== By-elections ==
=== 2005–2010 Parliament ===
There were 14 by-elections in the 2005–2010 Parliament. Eight were in seats held by the governing Labour Party, three by the Conservatives, one by the Liberal Democrats, one by an independent and one by the speaker. Eight by-elections were won by the incumbent party, including in Haltemprice and Howden where Conservative David Davis resigned to recontest his seat. Meanwhile, Blaenau Gwent was won by a second independent candidate. Labour lost four seats; two to the Conservatives, one to the Liberal Democrats and one to the SNP. The speaker's seat was regained by Labour, the party speaker Michael Martin represented before he took up the position in a previous constituency. Eight by-elections were a result of the death of the incumbent MP – five Labour MPs died, along with one Liberal Democrat, one Conservative and independent MP Peter Law.

At the dissolution of Parliament in 2010 there were three vacancies: North West Leicestershire and Middlesbrough South and East Cleveland, caused by the death of their respective Labour members David Taylor and Ashok Kumar; and Strangford caused by the resignation of the DUP's Iris Robinson. With the close proximity of the 2010 general election, by-elections were not held in these seats. Middlesbrough South and East Cleveland and Strangford were held by Tom Blenkinsop and Jim Shannon respectively, but North West Leicestershire was won by Conservative Andrew Bridgen.

By-election	Date	Incumbent	Party	Winner	Party	Cause
Glasgow North East (Note: Gain retained at the 2010 general election.)	12 November 2009	Michael Martin	Speaker	Willie Bain	Labour	Resignation
Norwich North	23 July 2009	Ian Gibson	Labour	Chloe Smith	Conservative	Resignation
Glenrothes (Note: Hold retained at the 2010 general election.)	6 November 2008	John MacDougall	Labour	Lindsay Roy	Labour	Death (mesothelioma)
Glasgow East (Note: Gain not retained at the 2010 general election.)	24 July 2008	David Marshall	Labour	John Mason	SNP	Resignation due to ill health
Haltemprice and Howden	10 July 2008	David Davis	Conservative	David Davis	Conservative	Resigned to recontest
Henley	26 June 2008	Boris Johnson	Conservative	John Howell	Conservative	Resignation on election as Mayor of London
Crewe and Nantwich	22 May 2008	Gwyneth Dunwoody	Labour	Edward Timpson	Conservative	Death (heart attack)
Sedgefield	19 July 2007	Tony Blair	Labour	Phil Wilson	Labour	Resignation on appointment as Middle East Envoy
Ealing Southall	19 July 2007	Piara Khabra	Labour	Virendra Sharma	Labour	Death (liver problems)
Bromley and Chislehurst	29 June 2006	Eric Forth	Conservative	Bob Neill	Conservative	Death (cancer)
Blaenau Gwent (Note: Hold not retained at the 2010 general election.)	29 June 2006	Peter Law	Independent	Dai Davies	Independent	Death (cancer)
Dunfermline and West Fife	9 February 2006	Rachel Squire	Labour	Willie Rennie	Liberal Democrats	Death (cancer/stroke)
Livingston	29 September 2005	Robin Cook	Labour	Jim Devine (Note: Jim Devine was not allowed to stand at the 2010 general election due to an expenses scandal. Graeme Morrice was elected instead.)	Labour	Death (heart disease)
Cheadle	14 July 2005	Patsy Calton	Liberal Democrats	Mark Hunter	Liberal Democrats	Death (cancer)

=== 2001–2005 Parliament ===
There were six by-elections in the 2001–2005 Parliament. Each were in seats held by the governing Labour Party, four of which were held and two won by the Liberal Democrats. Four by-elections were a result of the death of the incumbent MP.

By-election	Date	Incumbent	Party	Winner	Party	Cause
Hartlepool (Note: Hold retained at the 2005 general election.)	30 September 2004	Peter Mandelson	Labour	Iain Wright	Labour	Resignation on appointment as European Commissioner
Birmingham Hodge Hill	15 July 2004	Terry Davis	Labour	Liam Byrne	Labour	Resignation on appointment as Secretary-General of the Council of Europe
Leicester South (Note: Gain not retained at the 2005 general election.)	15 July 2004	Jim Marshall	Labour	Parmjit Singh Gill	Liberal Democrats	Death (heart attack)
Brent East (Note: Gain retained at the 2005 general election.)	18 September 2003	Paul Daisley	Labour	Sarah Teather	Liberal Democrats	Death (cancer)
Ogmore	14 February 2002	Sir Raymond Powell	Labour	Huw Irranca-Davies	Labour	Death (unknown; probable asthma attack)
Ipswich	22 November 2001	Jamie Cann	Labour	Chris Mole	Labour	Death (liver disease)

=== 1997–2001 Parliament ===
There were 17 by-elections in the 1997–2001 Parliament. Eight were in seats held by the governing Labour party, five by the Conservatives, one by the Liberal Democrats, one by Plaid Cymru, one by the Ulster Unionist Party and one by the speaker. 14 by-elections were won by the incumbent party. The Conservatives lost one seat to the Liberal Democrats, and the Democratic Unionist Party gained South Antrim from the Ulster Unionists. The speaker's seat was regained by Labour, the party speaker Betty Boothroyd represented before she took up the position. Ten by-elections were a result of the death of the incumbent MP; six were Labour, three Conservative and one was the Ulster Unionist MP Clifford Forsythe.

By-election	Date	Incumbent	Party	Winner	Party	Cause
Falkirk West (Note: Hold retained at the 2001 general election.)	21 December 2000	Dennis Canavan	Labour/ Independent (Note: Dennis Canavan was elected as a Labour MP from Feb 1974 onwards but in 1999 left the party when he was not selected as a Labour candidate for the Scottish Parliament and instead successfully stood as an independent.)	Eric Joyce	Labour	Resignation in order to concentrate on his role as a Member of the Scottish Parliament
West Bromwich West	23 November 2000	Betty Boothroyd	Speaker (Note: Betty Boothroyd had originally been elected as a Labour MP.)	Adrian Bailey	Labour	Resignation on retirement as Speaker of the House of Commons
Preston	23 November 2000	Audrey Wise	Labour	Mark Hendrick	Labour	Death (cancer)
Glasgow Anniesland	23 November 2000	Donald Dewar	Labour	John Robertson	Labour	Death (Brain haemorrhage after heart surgery)
South Antrim (Note: Gain not retained at the 2001 general election.)	21 September 2000	Clifford Forsythe	UUP	William McCrea	DUP	Death (sudden illness)
Tottenham	22 June 2000	Bernie Grant	Labour	David Lammy	Labour	Death (heart attack)
Romsey (Note: Gain retained at the 2001 general election.)	4 May 2000	Michael Colvin	Conservative	Sandra Gidley	Liberal Democrats	Death (accidental fire)
Ceredigion	3 February 2000	Cynog Dafis	Plaid Cymru	Simon Thomas	Plaid Cymru	Resignation following election to the Welsh Assembly
Kensington and Chelsea	25 November 1999	Alan Clark	Conservative	Michael Portillo	Conservative	Death (cancer)
Wigan	23 September 1999	Roger Stott	Labour	Neil Turner	Labour	Death (long illness)
Hamilton South	23 September 1999	George Robertson	Labour	Bill Tynan	Labour	Life peerage upon appointment as Secretary-General of NATO
Eddisbury	22 July 1999	Alastair Goodlad	Conservative	Stephen O'Brien	Conservative	Resignation on appointment as High Commissioner to Australia
Leeds Central	10 June 1999	Derek Fatchett	Labour	Hilary Benn	Labour	Death (heart attack)
Winchester	20 November 1997	Mark Oaten	Liberal Democrats	Mark Oaten	Liberal Democrats	Void election
Beckenham	20 November 1997	Piers Merchant	Conservative	Jacqui Lait	Conservative	Resignation (scandal)
Paisley South	6 November 1997	Gordon McMaster	Labour	Douglas Alexander	Labour	Death (suicide)
Uxbridge	31 July 1997	Sir Michael Shersby	Conservative	John Randall	Conservative	Death (heart attack)

=== 1992–1997 Parliament ===
There were 18 by-elections in the 1992–1997 Parliament. Eight were in seats held by the governing Conservative party, nine by Labour and one by the Ulster Popular Unionist Party. Nine by-elections were won by the incumbent party, all of which happened to be Labour. The Conservatives lost all eight seats in the by-elections – four to the Liberal Democrats, three to Labour and one to the SNP. The UK Unionist Party gained North Down from the Ulster Popular Unionists. 16 by-elections were a result of the death of the incumbent MP – eight Conservatives died, along with seven Labour MPs and the Ulster Popular Unionist MP Sir James Kilfedder.

At the dissolution of Parliament in 1997 there were two vacancies: Meriden, caused by the death of its Conservative member Iain Mills, and Don Valley, caused by the death of its Labour member Martin Redmond. With the close proximity of the 1997 general election, by-elections were not held in these seats. They were held by Caroline Spelman and Caroline Flint respectively.

By-election	Date	Incumbent	Party	Winner	Party	Cause
Wirral South	27 February 1997 (Note: Gain retained at the 1997 general election.)	Barry Porter	Conservative	Ben Chapman	Labour	Death (cancer)
Barnsley East	12 December 1996	Terry Patchett	Labour	Jeff Ennis	Labour	Death (cancer)
South East Staffordshire	11 April 1996	Sir David Lightbown	Conservative	Brian Jenkins	Labour	Death (heart attack)
Hemsworth	1 February 1996	Derek Enright	Labour	Jon Trickett	Labour	Death (cancer)
Littleborough and Saddleworth	27 July 1995 (Note: Littleborough and Saddleworth was abolished in boundary changes taking effect from 1997. Davies contested the successor seat of Oldham East and Saddleworth for the Liberal Democrats but lost to Labour.)	Geoffrey Dickens	Conservative	Chris Davies	Liberal Democrats	Death (long illness)
North Down	15 June 1995	Sir James Kilfedder	UPUP	Robert McCartney	UK Unionist	Death (heart attack)
Perth and Kinross	25 May 1995	Sir Nicholas Fairbairn	Conservative	Roseanna Cunningham	SNP	Death (liver cirrhosis)
Islwyn	16 February 1995	Neil Kinnock	Labour	Don Touhig	Labour	Appointment as European Commissioner
Dudley West	15 December 1994	John Blackburn	Conservative	Ian Pearson	Labour	Death (heart attack)
Monklands East	30 June 1994	John Smith	Labour	Helen Liddell	Labour	Death (heart attack)
Newham North East	9 June 1994	Ron Leighton	Labour	Stephen Timms	Labour	Death
Eastleigh	9 June 1994	Stephen Milligan	Conservative	David Chidgey	Liberal Democrats	Death (auto-erotic asphyxiation)
Dagenham	9 June 1994	Bryan Gould	Labour	Judith Church	Labour	Appointment as Vice-Chancellor of the University of Waikato, New Zealand
Bradford South	9 June 1994	Bob Cryer	Labour	Gerry Sutcliffe	Labour	Death (road accident)
Barking	9 June 1994	Jo Richardson	Labour	Margaret Hodge	Labour	Death (long illness)
Rotherham	5 May 1994	Jimmy Boyce	Labour	Denis MacShane	Labour	Death (heart attack)
Christchurch	29 July 1993 (Note: Gain not retained at the 1997 general election.)	Robert Adley	Conservative	Diana Maddock	Liberal Democrats	Death (heart attack)
Newbury	6 May 1993	Judith Chaplin	Conservative	David Rendel	Liberal Democrats	Death (complications following surgery)

=== 1987–1992 Parliament ===
There were 24 by-elections in the 1987–1992 Parliament. Ten were in seats held by the governing Conservative party, 13 by Labour and one by the Ulster Unionist Party. 16 by-elections were won by the incumbent party. Labour lost one seat to the SNP, and the Conservatives lost seven seats; four to Labour and three to the Liberal Democrats. 20 by-elections were a result of the death of the incumbent MP – 11 Labour MPs died, along with eight Conservatives and Ulster Unionist Harold McCusker.

By-election	Date	Incumbent	Party	Winner	Party	Cause
Langbaurgh	7 November 1991 (Note: Gain not retained at the 1992 general election.)	Richard Holt	Conservative	Ashok Kumar	Labour	Death
Kincardine and Deeside	7 November 1991	Alick Buchanan-Smith	Conservative	Nicol Stephen	Liberal Democrats	Death
Hemsworth	7 November 1991	George Buckley	Labour	Derek Enright	Labour	Death
Liverpool Walton	4 July 1991	Eric Heffer	Labour	Peter Kilfoyle	Labour	Death (cancer)
Monmouth	16 May 1991	Sir John Stradling Thomas	Conservative	Huw Edwards	Labour	Death
Neath	4 April 1991	Donald Coleman	Labour	Peter Hain	Labour	Death
Ribble Valley	7 March 1991	David Waddington	Conservative	Michael Carr	Liberal Democrats	Life peerage on appointment as Leader of the House of Lords
Paisley South	29 November 1990	Norman Buchan	Labour	Gordon McMaster	Labour	Death
Paisley North	29 November 1990	Allen Adams	Labour	Irene Adams	Labour	Death (brain haemorrhage)
Bradford North	8 November 1990	Pat Wall	Labour	Terry Rooney	Labour	Death (long illness)
Bootle	8 November 1990	Michael Carr	Labour	Joseph Benton	Labour	Death (heart attack)
Eastbourne	18 October 1990	Ian Gow	Conservative	David Bellotti	Liberal Democrats	Death (terrorism)
Knowsley South	27 September 1990	Sean Hughes	Labour	Edward O'Hara	Labour	Death (cancer)
Bootle	24 May 1990	Allan Roberts	Labour	Michael Carr	Labour	Death (cancer)
Upper Bann	17 May 1990	Harold McCusker	UUP	David Trimble	UUP	Death (cancer)
Mid Staffordshire	22 March 1990	John Heddle	Conservative	Sylvia Heal	Labour	Death (suicide)
Vauxhall	15 June 1989	Stuart Holland	Labour	Kate Hoey	Labour	Appointment to the European University Institute, Florence
Glasgow Central	15 June 1989	Bob McTaggart	Labour	Mike Watson	Labour	Death (heart attack)
Vale of Glamorgan	4 May 1989	Sir Raymond Gower	Conservative	John Smith	Labour	Death
Richmond	23 February 1989	Leon Brittan	Conservative	William Hague	Conservative	Appointment as European Commissioner
Pontypridd	23 February 1989	Brynmor John	Labour	Kim Howells	Labour	Death (chronic fatigue syndrome)
Epping Forest	15 December 1988	Sir John Biggs-Davison	Conservative	Steven Norris	Conservative	Death
Glasgow Govan	10 November 1988	Bruce Millan	Labour	Jim Sillars	SNP	Appointment as European Commissioner
Kensington	14 July 1988	Sir Brandon Rhys-Williams, Bt.	Conservative	Dudley Fishburn	Conservative	Death (leukaemia)

=== 1983–1987 Parliament ===
There were 31 by-elections in the 1983–1987 Parliament. Nine were in seats held by the governing Conservative party, six by Labour and one by the Liberals. The remaining 15 were in Northern Ireland, involving the province's own political parties. 25 by-elections were won by the incumbent party, including all in Northern Ireland except one. The Conservatives lost five seats; one to Labour, two to the Liberals, and two to the Social Democrats. The Ulster Unionists lost one seat to the Social Democratic and Labour Party. 11 by-elections were the result of the death of the incumbent MP; seven were Conservatives, three Labour and one Liberal.

By-election	Date	Incumbent	Party	Winner	Party	Cause
Truro	12 March 1987	David Penhaligon	Liberal	Matthew Taylor	Liberal	Death (road accident)
Greenwich	26 February 1987 (Note: Gain retained at the 1987 general election.)	Guy Barnett	Labour	Rosie Barnes	SDP	Death
Knowsley North	13 November 1986	Robert Kilroy-Silk	Labour	George Howarth	Labour	New BBC TV presenter career
Newcastle-under-Lyme	17 July 1986	John Golding	Labour	Llin Golding	Labour	Appointment as General Secretary of the National Communications Union
Ryedale	8 May 1986 (Note: Gain not retained at the 1987 general election.)	John Spence	Conservative	Elizabeth Shields	Liberal	Death
West Derbyshire	8 May 1986	Matthew Parris	Conservative	Patrick McLoughlin	Conservative	Appointment as presenter of LWT programme Weekend World
Fulham	10 April 1986	Martin Stevens	Conservative	Nick Raynsford	Labour	Death
Upper Bann	23 January 1986	Harold McCusker	UUP	Harold McCusker	UUP	Sought re-election in opposition to the Anglo-Irish Agreement
Strangford	23 January 1986	John Taylor	UUP	John Taylor	UUP	Sought re-election in opposition to the Anglo-Irish Agreement
Newry & Armagh	23 January 1986	James Nicholson	UUP	Seamus Mallon	SDLP	Sought re-election in opposition to the Anglo-Irish Agreement
North Antrim	23 January 1986	Ian Paisley	DUP	Ian Paisley	DUP	Sought re-election in opposition to the Anglo-Irish Agreement
East Antrim	23 January 1986	Roy Beggs	UUP	Roy Beggs	UUP	Sought re-election in opposition to the Anglo-Irish Agreement
South Antrim	23 January 1986	Clifford Forsythe	UUP	Clifford Forsythe	UUP	Sought re-election in opposition to the Anglo-Irish Agreement
Belfast North	23 January 1986	Cecil Walker	UUP	Cecil Walker	UUP	Sought re-election in opposition to the Anglo-Irish Agreement
Belfast East	23 January 1986	Peter Robinson	DUP	Peter Robinson	DUP	Sought re-election in opposition to the Anglo-Irish Agreement
Belfast South	23 January 1986	Martin Smyth	UUP	Martin Smyth	UUP	Sought re-election in opposition to the Anglo-Irish Agreement
North Down	23 January 1986	James Kilfedder	UPUP	James Kilfedder	UPUP	Sought re-election in opposition to the Anglo-Irish Agreement
South Down	23 January 1986 (Note: Enoch Powell retained the seat for the Ulster Unionists in the by-election but lost it to the Social Democratic and Labour Party at the 1987 general election.)	Enoch Powell	UUP	Enoch Powell	UUP	Sought re-election in opposition to the Anglo-Irish Agreement
Fermanagh & South Tyrone	23 January 1986	Ken Maginnis	UUP	Ken Maginnis	UUP	Sought re-election in opposition to the Anglo-Irish Agreement
Lagan Valley	23 January 1986	James Molyneaux	UUP	James Molyneaux	UUP	Sought re-election in opposition to the Anglo-Irish Agreement
East Londonderry	23 January 1986	William Ross	UUP	William Ross	UUP	Sought re-election in opposition to the Anglo-Irish Agreement
Mid Ulster	23 January 1986	William McCrea	DUP	William McCrea	DUP	Sought re-election in opposition to the Anglo-Irish Agreement
Tyne Bridge	5 December 1985	Harry Cowans	Labour	David Clelland	Labour	Death
Brecon and Radnor	4 July 1985	Tom Hooson	Conservative	Richard Livsey	Liberal	Death (heart attack)
Enfield Southgate	13 December 1984	Sir Anthony Berry	Conservative	Michael Portillo	Conservative	Death (terrorism)
Portsmouth South	14 June 1984	Bonner Pink	Conservative	Mike Hancock	SDP	Death
South West Surrey	3 May 1984	Viscount Macmillan of Ovenden	Conservative	Virginia Bottomley	Conservative	Death (heart failure)
Stafford	3 May 1984	Sir Hugh Fraser	Conservative	Bill Cash	Conservative	Death (lung cancer)
Cynon Valley	3 May 1984	Ioan Evans	Labour	Ann Clwyd	Labour	Death
Chesterfield	1 March 1984	Eric Varley	Labour	Tony Benn	Labour	Appointment as Chairman of Coalite PLC
Penrith and the Border	28 July 1983	William Whitelaw	Conservative	David Maclean	Conservative	Hereditary peerage on appointment as Leader of the House of Lords

=== 1979–1983 Parliament ===
There were 20 by-elections in the 1979–1983 Parliament. Seven were in seats held by the governing Conservative party, ten by Labour, one by the Ulster Unionists and two (in the same seat) by Irish republican parties, who do not take up their seats in the House of Commons. 13 by-elections were won by the incumbent party. The Conservatives lost four seats: one to Labour, one to the Liberals and two to the Social Democrats, and Labour lost two seats: one to the Liberals and one to the Conservatives. Meanwhile, the seat of Fermanagh and South Tyrone was won from the Independent Republican Party by Anti H-Block, a branch of Sinn Féin. 15 by-elections were a result of the death of the incumbent MP; six were Conservatives, six Labour, and the others were the Ulster Unionist Robert Bradford, the Independent Republican Frank Maguire and the Anti H-Block member Bobby Sands (who was in prison).

By-election	Date	Incumbent	Party	Winner	Party	Cause
Darlington	24 March 1983 (Note: Oswald O'Brien retained the seat for Labour in the by-election but lost it to the Conservatives in the 1983 general election 11 weeks later.)	Edward Fletcher	Labour	Oswald O'Brien	Labour	Death
Bermondsey	24 February 1983 (Note: Gain retained at the 1983 general election.)	Robert Mellish	Labour/Ind Labour	Simon Hughes	Liberal	Resignation (dispute with party)
Glasgow Queen's Park	2 December 1982	Frank McElhone	Labour	Helen McElhone	Labour	Death
Peckham	28 October 1982	Harry Lamborn	Labour	Harriet Harman	Labour	Death
Birmingham Northfield	28 October 1982 (Note: Gain not retained at the 1983 general election.)	Jocelyn Cadbury	Conservative	John Spellar	Labour	Death (suicide)
Gower	16 September 1982	Ifor Davies	Labour	Gareth Wardell	Labour	Death
Coatbridge and Airdrie	24 June 1982	James Dempsey	Labour	Thomas Clarke	Labour	Death
Mitcham and Morden	3 June 1982 (Note: Mitcham and Morden was the last time an incumbent government gained a seat from the opposition in a by-election until the Copeland by-election on 23 February 2017.)	Bruce Douglas-Mann	Labour/Ind SDP	Angela Rumbold	Conservative	Sought re-election upon change of party allegiance
Beaconsfield	27 May 1982	Sir Ronald Bell	Conservative	Tim Smith	Conservative	Death
Glasgow Hillhead	25 March 1982	Sir Thomas Galbraith	Conservative	Roy Jenkins	SDP	Death
Belfast South	4 March 1982	Robert Bradford	UUP	Martin Smyth	UUP	Death (killed by IRA)
Crosby	26 November 1981	Sir Graham Page	Conservative	Shirley Williams	SDP	Death
Croydon North West	22 October 1981	Robert Taylor	Conservative	Bill Pitt	Liberal	Death
Fermanagh & South Tyrone	20 August 1981 (Note: Following Sands's death, Owen Carron retained the seat for Anti H-Block in the second by-election and defended it as Sinn Féin in the 1983 general election but lost to the Ulster Unionists.)	Bobby Sands	Anti H-Block	Owen Carron	Anti H-Block	Death (hunger strike)
Warrington	16 July 1981	Sir Thomas Williams	Labour	Doug Hoyle	Labour	Appointment as High Court judge
Fermanagh & South Tyrone	9 April 1981	Frank Maguire	Ind. Republican	Bobby Sands	Anti H-Block	Death
Glasgow Central	26 June 1980	Thomas McMillan	Labour	Bob McTaggart	Labour	Death (fall)
Southend East	13 March 1980	Sir Stephen McAdden	Conservative	Teddy Taylor	Conservative	Death (fall)
South West Hertfordshire	13 December 1979	Geoffrey Dodsworth	Conservative	Richard Page	Conservative	Resignation on medical advice
Manchester Central	27 September 1979	Harold Lever	Labour	Bob Litherland	Labour	Life peerage

== See also ==
- List of United Kingdom by-elections (2010–present)
- List of United Kingdom by-elections (1950–1979)
- United Kingdom by-election records

== Sources ==
- United Kingdom Election Results (David Boothroyd)
- United Kingdom Elections (Keele University)
- British Parliamentary By-Elections since 1945
- List of MPs since 1660
- F. W. S. Craig (1984). British parliamentary election results, 1974–1983. Chichester: Parliamentary Research Services. ISBN 0-900178-23-X.
- F. W. S. Craig, British Parliamentary Election Statistics 1832–1987
- F. W. S. Craig (1987). Chronology of British by-elections, 1832–1987. Chichester: Parliamentary Research Services. ISBN 0-900178-31-0.
