= 1979 United Kingdom general election in Northern Ireland =

- 3 May 1979

All 12 Northern Ireland seats in the House of Commons
- Turnout: 67.7% ( pp)
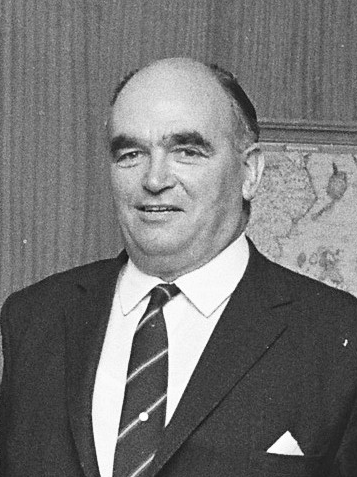

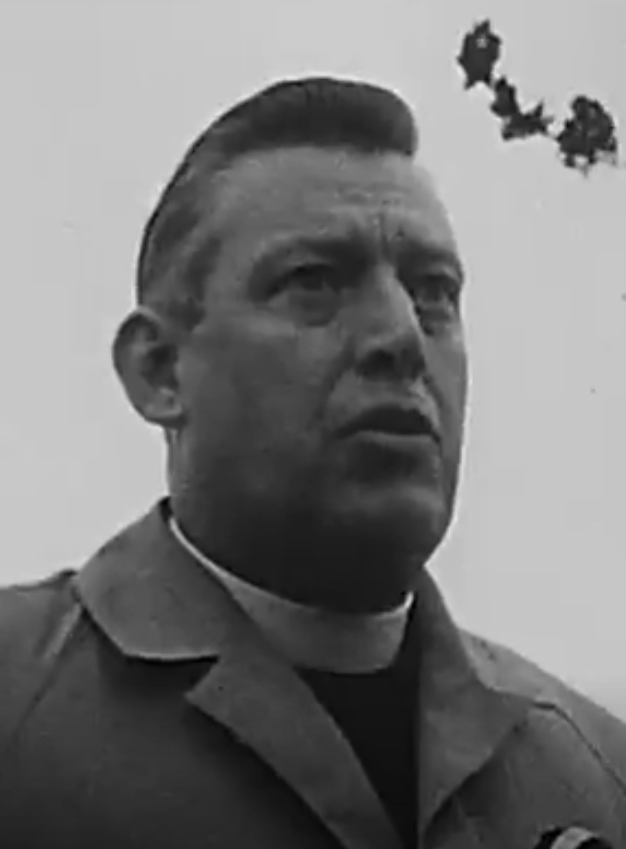
	First party	Second party
Leader	Harry West	Ian Paisley
Party	UUP	DUP
Leader since	Jan. 1974	1971
Leader's seat	Ran in Fermanagh and South Tyrone (defeated)	Antrim North
Last election	6 seats, 36.5%	1 seat, 8.5%
Seats won	5	3
Seat change	▼1	▲2
Popular vote	254,578	70,795
Percentage	36.6%	10.2%
Swing	▲0.1 pp	▲1.7 pp
	Third party	Fourth party
	SDLP	UUUP
Leader	Gerry Fitt	Ernest Baird
Party	SDLP	UUUP
Leader since	1970	1975
Leader's seat	Belfast West	Ran in Fermanagh and South Tyrone (defeated)
Last election	1 seat, 22.0%	Did not stand
Seats won	1	1
Seat change	Steady	▲1
Popular vote	126,235	39,856
Percentage	18.2%	5.7%
Swing	▼3.8 pp	New Party

On 3 May 1979, the 1979 United Kingdom general election was held in Northern Ireland, to elect all 635 members of the House of Commons, with 12 constituencies being in Northern Ireland.

The election was after Labour Party prime minister James Callaghan lost a vote of confidence by 311 votes to 310. The election was won by the Conservative Party led by Margaret Thatcher, and began a period of 18-year government by the party, with the election being the first of four consecutive election victories for the Conservative Party.

== Candidates ==
Below is a table summarising the candidates of the February 1974 general election in Northern Ireland.

Affiliation	Candidates
Alliance Party of Northern Ireland	12
Ulster Unionist Party	11
Social Democratic and Labour Party	9
Republican Clubs	7
Democratic Unionist Party	5
Irish Independence Party	4
Unionist Party of Northern Ireland	3
Northern Ireland Labour Party	3
United Ulster Unionist Party	2
Independent Unionist	1 (Note: James Kilfedder stood in North Down.)
United Labour Party	1 (Note: Candidate Bob Kidd stood in South Antrim.)
Reform	1 (Note: Candidate Peter Courtney stood in South Down.)
Inter-Dependence Party	1 (Note: Candidate Francis Rice stood in South Down.)
Independent Republican	1 (Note: Candidate Frank Maguire stood in Fermanagh and South Tyrone.)
Independent Labour	1 (Note: Candidate William Webster stood in Londonderry.)
Independent Social Democratic and Labour	1 (Note: Candidate Austin Currie stood in Fermanagh and South Tyrone.)
Labour Integrationist	1 (Note: Candidate Jeff Dudgeon stood in Belfast South.)
Total	64

== Analysis ==
Ulster Unionist leader Harry West failed to win a seat for the second time, and would resign later that year after failing to win a seat at the first European Parliament election. The Vanguard Unionist Progressive Party had disbanded with its members and MPs primarily joining the Ulster Unionist Party. Of the Vanguard's three Members of Parliament, two joined the UUP. Robert Bradford was re-elected in Belfast South; however, the former party's leader William Craig lost Belfast East.

Conversely, the newly formed United Ulster Unionist Party, which had split from the Vanguard, won the seat of Mid Ulster This was by way of John Dunlop, former member and MP in the seat for the Vanguard, retaining the seat and therefor winning the seat for the UUUP from his former party.

The Democratic Unionist Party increased its representation from the one seat of Leader Ian Paisley in North Antrim. The party also won Belfast East from William Craig, with future Leader of the CUP and First Minister and Deputy First Minister of Northern Ireland Peter Robinson entering Parliament. the Democratic Unionist also won Belfast North from the UUP.

Frank Maguire was re-elected as an Independent Nationalist, defeating the leaders of both the UUP and the new United Ulster Unionist Party, as well as Austin Currie, a member of the SDLP standing without the support of the party. Maguire's death on 5 March 1981 led to a by-election won by Bobby Sands, an IRA prisoner who died later that year as a result of a hunger strike. The Representation of the People Act 1981 disqualified prisoners detained for more than a year from membership of the House of Commons, so the resulting by-election was contested by Sands's election agent Owen Carron, rather than by another prisoner on hunger strike.

== Results ==
Party	Seats					Aggregate Votes		
Party	Total	Gains	Losses	Net	Of total (%)	Total	Of total (%)	Change (%)
UUP	5	0	1	▼1	41.7	254,578	36.6	▲0.1
SDLP	1	0	0	Steady	8.3	126,235	18.2	▼3.8
Alliance	0	0	0	Steady	—	82,892	11.9	▲5.5
DUP	3	2	0	▲2	25.0	70,795	10.2	▲1.7
UUUP	1	New		▲1	8.3	39,856	5.7	New
Ind. Unionist	1	1	0	▲1	8.3	36,989	5.3	▲4.6
Irish Independence	0	New			—	23,086	3.3	New
Ind. Republican	1	0	0	Steady	8.3	22,398	3.2	▼1.5
Republican Clubs	0	0	0	Steady	—	12,098	1.7	▼1.4
Independent SDLP	0	New			—	10,795	1.6	New
Unionist Party NI	0	0	0	Steady	—	8,021	1.2	▼1.7
NI Labour	0	0	0	Steady	—	4,411	0.6	▼1.0
United Labour	0	New			—	1,895	0.3	New
Labour Integrationist	0	New			—	692	0.1	New
Independent Labour	0	Did not stand in Oct. 1974			—	639	0.1	—N/a
Inter-Dependence	0	New			—	216	0.0	New
Reform	0	New			—	31	0.0	New
Other	0	—N/a		▼3 (Note: 3 Vanguard Unionist Progressive Party MPs when the party disbanded.)	—	31	0.0	—N/a
Blank and invalid votes						7,512	—	—
Total	12			0	100.0	695,887 (Note: All valid votes excluding spoiled votes.)	100.0	0.0
Registered voters, and turnout						1,027,204	67.7	Steady

Popular vote
UUP	36.6%
SDLP	18.2%
APNI	11.9%
DUP	10.2%
UUUP	5.7%
Ind. Unionist	5.3%
IIP	3.3%
Ind. Republican	3.2%
Republican Clubs	1.7%
NI Labour	0.6%
Other	2.1%

Parliamentary seats
UUP	41.7%
DUP	25.0%
SDLP	8.3%
Ind. Unionist	8.3%
Ind. Republican	8.3%

== MPs elected ==
Constituency	Party	MP
Antrim North	DUP	Ian Paisley
Antrim South	UUP	James Molyneaux
Armagh	UUP	Harold McCusker
Belfast East	DUP	Peter Robinson
Belfast North	DUP	John McQuade
Belfast South	UUP	Robert Bradford
Belfast West	SDLP	Gerry Fitt
Down North	Ind. Unionist	Jim Kilfedder
Down South	UUP	Enoch Powell
Fermanagh and South Tyrone	Ind. Nationalist	Frank Maguire
Londonderry	UUP	William Ross
Mid Ulster	UUUP	John Dunlop

=== By-elections ===
Constituency	Date	Incumbent	Party	Winner	Party	Cause
Fermanagh and South Tyrone	9 April 1981	Frank Maguire	Ind. Nationalist	Bobby Sands	Anti H-Block	Death
Fermanagh and South Tyrone	20 August 1981	Bobby Sands	Anti H-Block	Owen Carron	Anti H-Block	Death from hunger strike
Belfast South	4 March 1982	Robert Bradford	UUP	Martin Smyth	UUP	Killed by the IRA

== See also ==
- 1979 United Kingdom general election in England
- 1979 United Kingdom general election in Scotland
- 1979 United Kingdom general election in Wales
