= South Fermanagh =

South Fermanagh may refer to:

- The southern part of County Fermanagh
- South Fermanagh (Northern Ireland Parliament constituency)
- South Fermanagh (UK Parliament constituency)
