= Balmoral Furniture Company bombing =

Balmoral Furniture Company bombing may refer to the following events in Belfast, Northern Ireland:

- 1971 Balmoral Furniture Company bombing, on Shankill Road
- 1976 Balmoral Furniture Company bombing, in Dunmurry
