= John Carron =

Politician in Northern Ireland

Member of Parliament for South Fermanagh
- In office 1965–1972

Personal details
- Born: 1909 Kinawley, County Fermanagh, Ireland
- Died: 1998 (aged 88–89)
- Party: Nationalist Party
- Relatives: Frank Maguire (nephew); Owen Carron (nephew)

John Carron (1909–1998) was a nationalist politician in Northern Ireland.

== Biography ==
Carron was born in Kinawley, County Fermanagh in 1909. He became a farmer and a publican before becoming a founder member and vice-chairman of the Irish Anti-Partition League in Lisnaskea in May 1946. He was elected to Lisnaskea Rural District Council and also became the Chairman of the Enniskillen Fisheries Board.

At the 1949 Northern Ireland general election, Carron unsuccessfully stood for the Nationalist Party in Lisnaskea. He next stood for Cahir Healys old seat South Fermanagh in 1965, this time successfully, holding the seat until the abolition of the Parliament of Northern Ireland at Stormont in 1972. In 1969, he was appointed Opposition Spokesman on Community Relations. He was invited to join the Social Democratic and Labour Party on its formation, but chose to remain a Nationalist Party member.

Frank Maguire, Member of Parliament for Fermanagh and South Tyrone, was a nephew of John Carron and, as a young man, worked in his uncle's pub. Sinn Féin activist Owen Carron, who was also an MP for Fermanagh and South Tyrone, was another of Carron's nephews.

Parliament of Northern Ireland
Preceded by Cahir Healy	Member of Parliament for South Fermanagh; 1965–1973	Parliament abolished
