= Wasp III (watercraft) =

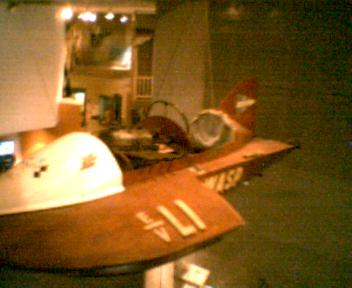
Wasp III currently resides in the Queensland Museum

Australian speedboat Wasp III is a racing hydroplane speedboat designed and built by Harry West, which held speed records in Australia in the 1950s and 60s. It is built from plywood and powered by a heavily modified Peugeot car engine. It is designed to skim the surface so that only the propeller and the tips of the hydroplanes are immersed when it is moving. The boat currently resides in the Queensland Museum in Brisbane, Australia.

== See also ==
- http://www.mms.qld.edu.au/getting-about/wasp.htm
