= 1976 Balmoral Furniture Company bombing =

Provisional Irish Republican Army (IRA) attack in Dunmurry, Northern Ireland

1976 Balmoral Furniture Company bombing, Dunmurry
- Part of the Troubles
- Date: 1976
- Attack type: Petrol Bombing
- Deaths: 0
- Injuries: 2

In 1976, nine Provisional Irish Republican Army (IRA) members bombed the Balmoral Furniture Company in Dunmurry, south- west of Belfast, Northern Ireland. The men included Bobby Sands and Joe McDonnell, both of whom later died from a hunger strike while imprisoned.

== Bombing ==
Kenny Donaldson, of Innocent Victims United, said about Bobby Sands, “Bobby Sands joined the Provisional IRA in 1972 after he moved to Twinbrook in [west] Belfast. In October 1972 he was arrested for possessing four handguns, convicted in April 1973 and released in 1976.”

Bobby Sands and Seamus Finucane planned for petrol bomb incendiaries to destroy the Balmoral Furniture Company on the outskirts of Belfast near the largely Catholic Twinbrook estate. Nine IRA men drove to the showroom, held up the security guard at gunpoint, and walked him into the shop. All staff and customers of the shop were escorted into the basement and four bombs were planted upstairs in the showroom. A staff member of an adjoining building noticed and used his car to block the entrance to the furniture shop. Police were called to the scene and the IRA men were surrounded. During the ensuing gunfight, two IRA men were shot and wounded and another four, including Sands, Joe McDonnell and Seamus, sat in a parked car pretending to be visiting the area in search of work. The four were sentenced to 14 years' imprisonment for possession of a revolver found in the car.

Kenny Donaldson adds that the incident happened 6 months after Sands was released in 1976, and that he and three other IRA men were arrested after the bombing of the Balmoral Furniture Company in Dunmurry, “There was a gun battle with the Royal Ulster Constabulary. Leaving behind the two wounded, the remaining four tried to escape by car, but were arrested.

“One of the revolvers used in the attack was found in the car. In 1977 the four [including Sands] were sentenced to 14 years for possession of the revolver. They were not charged with explosive offences.”

Following Sands and Joe McDonnell's arrests in October 1976, Sands was sentenced in 1977, arriving in HM Prison Maze late September; he refused to wear prison uniform. Both Sands and McDonnell went on to hunger strike.
