= Rodney Connor =

Public servant and politician from Northern Ireland

Chief Executive of Fermanagh District Council
- In office 2000–2010

Personal details
- Born: 25 March 1951 (age 74)
- Political party: Unionist "Unity"

Rodney Connor (born 25 March 1951) is a retired Chief Executive of Fermanagh District Council in Northern Ireland and was a candidate for political office.

== 2000s ==
In 2000, Connor was appointed as Chief Executive of Fermanagh District Council. In 2005 Connor was allegedly inappropriately appointed by unionist councillors voting along party lines, leading to concerns about unlawful discrimination. The unsuccessful candidates were compensated and the council was fined. The Ulster Unionist Party denied any wrongdoing and stated that Connor was simply the best candidate for the job. He continued to be employed by FDC until he retired in 2010.

== 2010 general election ==
Connor stood as the Unionist "Unity" candidate for the House of Commons of the United Kingdom in Fermanagh and South Tyrone in the 2010 Westminster election. He had the backing of the Democratic Unionist Party (DUP), and the Ulster Conservatives and Unionists – New Force electoral alliance between the Ulster Unionist Party (UUP) and the Conservative Party. Ulster Unionist MLA for Fermanagh and South Tyrone, Tom Elliott, said he was withdrawing his candidacy because he believed Connor was the ideal choice. He lost to the incumbent, Sinn Féin's Michelle Gildernew by four votes, having unsuccessfully challenged the result in the Election Court.
