= Frank Maguire (politician) =

Irish politician

Member of Parliament for Fermanagh and South Tyrone
- In office 10 October 1974 – 5 March 1981
- Preceded by: Harry West
- Succeeded by: Bobby Sands

Personal details
- Born: 2 September 1929 Gort, County Galway, Ireland
- Died: 5 March 1981 (aged 51) Enniskillen, County Fermanagh, Northern Ireland
- Party: Independent

Meredith Francis Maguire (2 September 1929 – 5 March 1981) was an Irish Republican who became an independent Member of the House of Commons of the United Kingdom. Born into an Irish republican family, he was interned during his youth for Irish Republican Army activities; while he later opposed violence, he remained close to the republican movement. He was running Frank's Bar, a public house in Lisnaskea, County Fermanagh, when he was elected as a unity candidate to represent Fermanagh and South Tyrone at the October 1974 general election. While not an abstentionist, Maguire's attendances at Westminster were infrequent and he never made a full speech, but he did cast some crucial votes to support the Labour government of the 1970s. He attended the no confidence vote against the Callaghan government, which brought it down by a single vote, to "abstain in person".

== Early life ==
Born in Gort, County Galway, and educated in Athlone, Maguire worked in his youth in a pub owned by his uncle, future Nationalist Party politician John Carron. He was attracted to the cause of Irish republicanism and was interned without trial in Crumlin Road Jail in Belfast for two years, within which he was the commanding officer of the Irish Republican Army. After his release, he opposed violence and became a pub landlord. He did remain associated with Sinn Féin.

== Political career ==
In the Fermanagh and South Tyrone constituency there was a close balance between Irish nationalist and Unionist voters. In the February 1974 general election, the Nationalist/Republican vote was split between a Unity and a Social Democratic and Labour Party (SDLP) candidate, leading to victory for the Ulster Unionist Party (UUP) candidate. With the aim of fielding a single candidate, discussions among nationalist and republicans in the constituencies agreed Maguire as a joint candidate - in what has been termed the spirit of the Unity movement.

Maguire was elected in the October 1974 general election with more than half the vote. On 31 October 1974 he swore the Oath of Allegiance to Elizabeth II. Although not an abstentionist, he rarely attended the House of Commons. On the 1979 vote of no confidence in the government of James Callaghan, he declared, "I have come over here to abstain in person".

At the resulting 1979 general election, Maguire was re-elected against candidates from the SDLP, the UUP, and the United Ulster Unionist Party.

== Death ==
Maguire died in March 1981 due to a heart attack. This led to an April 1981 by-election which was won by Bobby Sands, an IRA hunger striker who died in May 1981. Sands's election agent and successor as MP for Fermanagh and South Tyrone, Owen Carron, was the nephew of Frank Maguire's uncle John.

Parliament of the United Kingdom
Preceded by Harry West	Member of Parliament for Fermanagh and South Tyrone; Oct 1974–1981	Succeeded by Bobby Sands
