= One Day in My Life =

1983 novel by Bobby Sands

One Day In My Life
- First edition cover
- Author: Bobby Sands
- Language: English
- Genre: Autobiographical novel
- Publisher: Mercier Press
- Publication date: 1983
- Publication place: Ireland
- Media type: Print (Paperback)
- Pages: 118 pp (first new edition, paperback)
- ISBN: 978-1-85635-349-6 (first new edition, paperback)
- OCLC: 56341882

One Day in My Life is an autobiographical novel written by Bobby Sands while serving a fourteen-year sentence at Long Kesh, for possession of a gun as a member of the Irish Republican Army.

The novel was originally written on "toilet paper with a biro refill... hidden inside Sands' own body" during the winter of 1979. and first published in 1983. It recounts Sands' mental, physical, and political struggles over a single day while he was taking part in the blanket protest against the removal of prisoners' political status by the British Government. In the book, Sands uses the phrase "concentration camp" to describe the conditions. He also recounts being severely beaten, abused, and sexually harassed by the prison warders.
