= April 1981 Fermanagh and South Tyrone by-election =

UK parliamentary by-election

Fermanagh and South Tyrone by-election
- 9 April 1981

Fermanagh and South Tyrone parliamentary seat
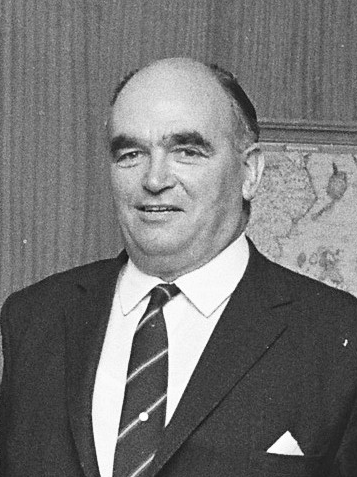
	First party	Second party
	AHB
Candidate	Bobby Sands	Harry West
Party	Anti H-Block	UUP
Popular vote	30,492	29,046
Percentage	51.2%	48.8%
MP before election
Frank Maguire
Ind. Republican
Subsequent MP
Bobby Sands
Anti H-Block

The 1981 by-election held in Fermanagh and South Tyrone on 9 April 1981 is considered by many to be the most significant by-election held in Northern Ireland during the Troubles. It saw the first electoral victory for militant Irish republicanism, which the following year entered electoral politics in full force as Sinn Féin. The successful candidate was the IRA hunger striker Bobby Sands, who died twenty-six days later.

The by-election was caused by the death of the sitting MP, Frank Maguire.

== Background of the constituency ==
The constituency, based on the districts of Fermanagh and Dungannon, was created in 1950 and had seen a series of closely fought elections between unionist and Irish nationalist candidates, with several elections being won due to the absence of competing candidates on one side or the other. Nationalists of various hues had won the constituency in the 1950, 1951 and 1955 general elections, while the Ulster Unionist Party had won in 1959, 1964 and 1966. As the Troubles gathered pace, nationalists agreed the Unity pact to run agreed candidates in border seats, with Frank McManus capturing Fermanagh and South Tyrone in the 1970 general election.

The February 1974 general election was the first to take place after several major political realignments in Northern Ireland. Opposition to the Sunningdale Agreement led to an alliance of unionist parties under the label of the United Ulster Unionist Coalition running agreed candidates in all constituencies, here putting forward the new leader of the Ulster Unionists, Harry West. Although unionist supporters of Sunningdale ran Hubert Brown, West garnered 26,858 votes (43.8%) to Brown's 3,157 (5.1%). The nationalist vote was evenly split with McManus gaining 16,229 votes (26.3%) and Denis Haughey, standing for the new Social Democratic and Labour Party (SDLP), winning 15,410 votes (25.0%). Many believed that an agreed single nationalist candidate could have won the seat. When a second general election was held in October Frank Maguire stood as an Independent Republican with backing from all nationalists, while West was the sole unionist. Maguire gained 32,795 votes (51.8%) to West's 30,285 (47.9%) and 185 (0.3%) for Alan Evans, standing for the Communist Party of Ireland (Marxist–Leninist).

The fine balance of the seat continued in the 1975 elections to the Northern Ireland Constitutional Convention when UUC gained 52% of the vote (with the small Unionist Party of Northern Ireland gaining an additional 2.3%). In the 1979 general election neither side fielded sole candidates. Maguire was challenged by Austin Currie, a local SDLP activist (and later official candidate) who disagreed with the party's decision to give Maguire a clear run, while the new Ulster Unionist candidate, Raymond Ferguson, was challenged by Ernest Baird, leader of the United Ulster Unionist Party, who sought to cement his new party's electoral position. Additionally the Alliance Party of Northern Ireland ran Peter Acheson. The results were: Maguire 22,398 (36.0%), Ferguson 17,411 (28.0%), Currie 10,785 (17.3%), Baird 10,607 (17.0%) and Acheson 1,070 (1.7%).

== Candidates in the 1981 by-election ==
Maguire's death led to a by-election in early 1981, when the 1981 Irish hunger strike was underway. The by-election was seized on by supporters of the hunger strike as a way to register a protest and the leader of the hunger strikers, Bobby Sands, was nominated on the label "Anti-H-Block/Armagh Political Prisoner". Owen Carron served as his agent and Danny Morrison organised the campaign.

The Ulster Unionist Party nominated Harry West, who had by now stood down as leader.

The Social Democratic and Labour Party had already selected Austin Currie as prospective candidate for the seat before a by-election was in prospect. When Sands' candidacy was announced the party came under pressure to withdraw in his favour, as putative candidates Bernadette Devlin-McAliskey and Noel Maguire had done, although initially it was said that the mainstream of the party was resistant. On the last day for nominations the party executive decided not to stand, explaining that they wished to concentrate on local government elections which would take place in May; there was speculation that the executive did not share the local party's confidence and feared a poor result. The SDLP decision not to stand in the by-election caused a great deal of dissent within the party.

No other candidates contested the seat, making it one of the last occasions when a Westminster constituency by-election had only two candidates. Currie railed against the SDLP's decision not to stand, but the result was a highly polarised contest between unionism and Irish republicanism.

== Result ==
April 1981 Fermanagh and South Tyrone by-election
Party	Candidate	Votes	%	±%
Anti H-Block	Bobby Sands	30,493	51.2	New
UUP	Harry West	29,046	48.8	+20.8
Majority		1,447	2.4	N/A
Turnout		59,538	82,3	−0.2
Registered electors		72,349		
Anti H-Block gain from Ind. Republican		Swing		

There were 3,280 spoilt ballot papers.

== Consequences ==
Sands died only twenty-six days later, precipitating a second by-election. New legislation was passed by Parliament to bar "convicted felons" from standing for election; as a result another hunger striker could not be nominated, so Owen Carron stood as "Anti-H-Block Proxy Political Prisoner". The following year saw Sinn Féin begin to contest elections in both Northern Ireland and the Republic of Ireland.
