= Joe McDonnell (hunger striker) =

Irish hunger striker and IRA volunteer

- Born: Joseph McDonnell; 14 September 1951; Belfast, Northern Ireland
- Died: 8 July 1981 (aged 29); HMP Maze, Northern Ireland
- Burial place: Milltown Cemetery
- Organization: Provisional IRA
- Known for: Hunger strike of 61 days, from 9 May 1981
- Spouse: Goretti (1970–1981; his death)
- Children: 2

Joseph McDonnell (14 September 1951 – 8 July 1981) was a volunteer in the Provisional Irish Republican Army (IRA) who died during the 1981 Irish hunger strike.

== Early life ==
Joseph McDonnell was born on Slate Street in the lower Falls Road of Belfast as fifth of eight children. He attended a nearby Roman Catholic school. He married Goretti in 1970, and moved into her sister's house at Horn Drive in the Lenadoon area. Their house, being one of only two Catholic households on an otherwise loyalist street, was attacked on numerous occasions before they were forced to move into Goretti's mother's house.

== IRA activity ==
McDonnell was arrested in Operation Demetrius, and along with Gerry Adams and others was interned on the prison ship HMS Maidstone. He was later moved to Long Kesh for several months. Upon release, he joined the Provisional IRA Belfast Brigade. He met Bobby Sands during the preparation for a firebomb attack on the Balmoral Furnishing Company's premises in Dunmurry. During the ensuing shoot-out between the IRA and the Royal Ulster Constabulary and army, both men, along with Séamus Finucane and Seán Lavery, were arrested. McDonnell and the others were sentenced to 14 years in prison for possession of a firearm. None of the men recognized nor accepted the jurisdiction of the court. Following sentencing, he was imprisoned in the H5 Block at HMP Maze.

== Hunger strike ==
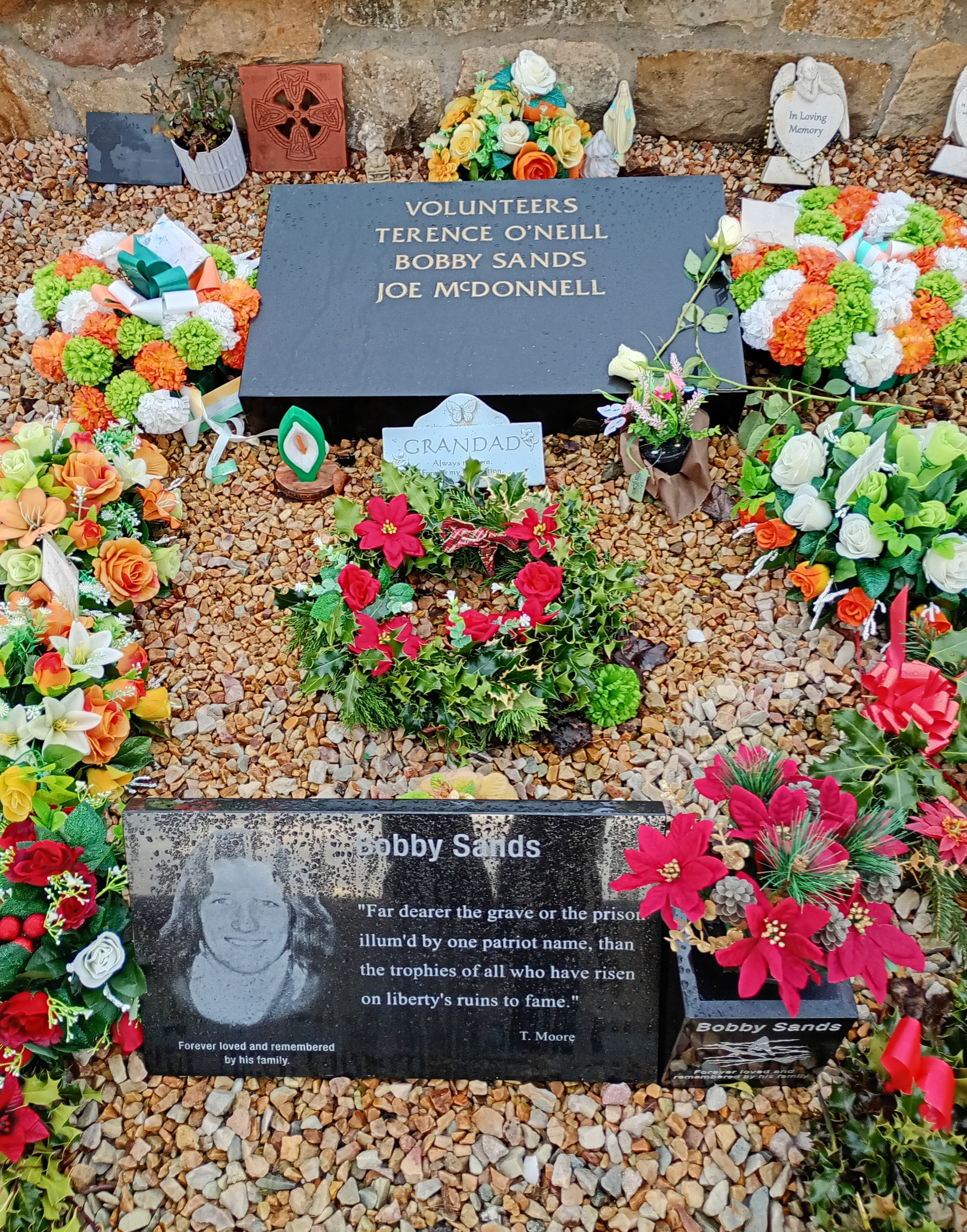
Grave of McDonnell and Bobby Sands in Milltown Cemetery

McDonnell agreed with the goals of the Irish hunger strike, namely: the right not to wear a prison uniform; the right not to do prison work; the right of free association with other prisoners; the right to organise their own educational and recreational facilities and the right to one visit, one letter and one parcel per week.

Although McDonnell was not involved in the first (1980) hunger strike, he joined Bobby Sands and the others in the second (1981) hunger strike. During the strike he stood as an Anti H-Block candidate in the 1981 general election in the Republic of Ireland for the Sligo–Leitrim constituency, receiving 5,639 votes and only being eliminated on the second last count. His hunger strike lasted for 61 days before dying on 8 July 1981. He had two children. His wife Goretti, and daughter Bernadette, took an active part in the campaign in support of the hunger strikers.

McDonnell was buried in the same grave as Bobby Sands at Milltown Cemetery. John Joe McGirl, McDonnell's election agent in Sligo–Leitrim, gave the oration at his funeral. Quoting Patrick Pearse, he stated: "He may seem the fool who has given his all, by the wise men of the world; but it was the apparent fools who changed the course of Irish history".

== Allegations ==
In March 2006, former prisoner Richard O'Rawe alleged that three days before McDonnell's death the British government made a firm offer to the prison leadership substantive enough to end the protest. O'Rawe alleges that while the leadership inside the prison were prepared to go for the deal and end the protest to save the lives of McDonnell and the others who died after him, the leadership outside told them to continue.

The IRA commander inside Long Kesh at the time, Brendan McFarlane, has publicly disputed this version of events. Only one other prisoner on the prison wing O'Rawe and McFarlane were on, Anthony McIntyre, has backed up O'Rawe's version of events in relation to the 1981 hunger strike.

== Commemoration ==
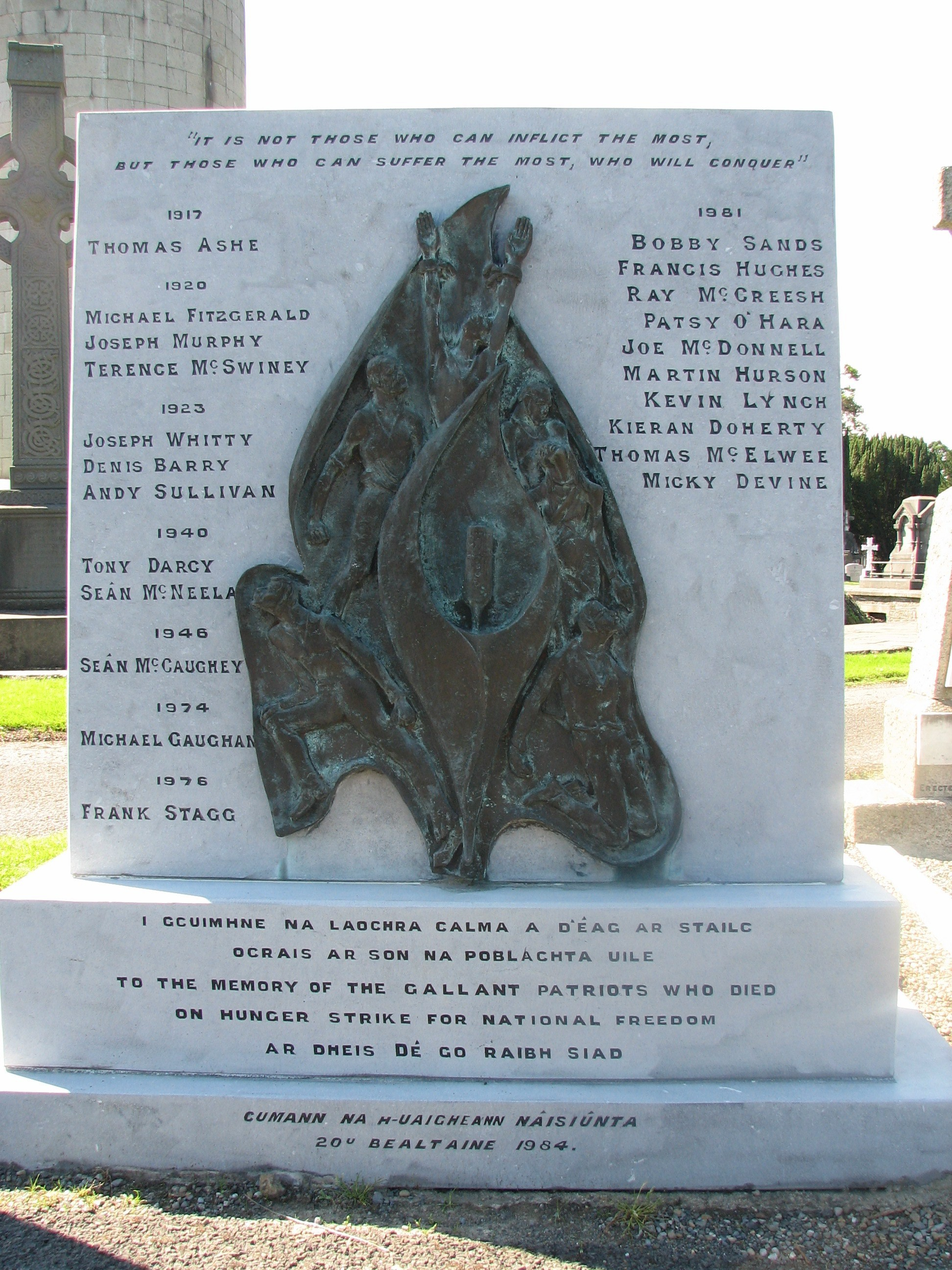
Memorial to 22 Irish Hunger Strikers Deaths. Glasnevin Cemetery

McDonnell was one of 22 Irish republicans (in the 20th century) who died on hunger-strike.

Joe McDonnell is also commemorated in the Wolfe Tones song, "Joe McDonnell". His family is also recognized in the Irish Brigade's "A Father's Blessing", and is one of the 10 hunger strikers mentioned in "Roll of Honour".
