= Fermanagh and South Tyrone (UK Parliament constituency) =

Parliamentary constituency in the United Kingdom, 1950 onwards

Coordinates: 54.542°N 7.309°W

- County constituency for the House of Commons
- Interactive map of boundaries from 2024
- Location within Northern Ireland
- District: Armagh City, Banbridge and Craigavon; Fermanagh and Omagh; Mid Ulster
- Electorate: 77,828 (July 2024)
- Major settlements: Enniskillen; Dungannon

Current constituency
- Created: 1950
- Member of Parliament: Pat Cullen (Sinn Féin)
- Seats: 1
- Created from: Fermanagh and Tyrone

Fermanagh and South Tyrone is a Northern Ireland parliamentary constituency in the House of Commons of the United Kingdom. It has been represented by Pat Cullen of Sinn Féin since the 2024 general election. The same area is also the Northern Ireland Assembly constituency of Fermanagh and South Tyrone.

== History ==
Fermanagh and South Tyrone was created in 1950 when the two-member Fermanagh and Tyrone was divided.

Throughout its existence, there has been a rough balance between unionist and nationalist voters, though in recent years the nationalists have had a slight majority. Many elections have seen a candidate from one community triumph due to multiple candidates from the other community splitting the vote. Perhaps because of this balance between the communities, Fermanagh and South Tyrone has on multiple occasions had the highest turnout and the smallest winning margin of any constituency in Northern Ireland.

The seat was won by the Nationalist Party in 1950 and 1951, the closely contested 1951 election seeing a 93.4% turnout – a UK record for any election.

In 1955 the constituency was won by Philip Clarke of Sinn Féin, but he was unseated on petition on the basis that his criminal conviction (for Irish Republican Army activity) made him ineligible. Instead, the seat was awarded to the Ulster Unionist Party (UUP) candidate.

In 1970 the seat was won by Frank McManus, standing on the Unity ticket that sought to unite nationalist voters behind a single candidate. In the February 1974 general election, however, the Social Democratic and Labour Party (SDLP) contested the seat, dividing the nationalist vote and allowing Harry West of the UUP to win with the support of the Vanguard Progressive Unionist Party and the Democratic Unionist Party.

In the October 1974 general election, a nationalist pact was agreed and Frank Maguire won, standing as an Independent Republican. He retained his seat in the 1979 general election, when both the unionist and nationalist votes were split, the former by the intervention of Ernest Baird, leader of the short-lived United Ulster Unionist Party, and the latter by Austin Currie, who defied the official SDLP decision to not contest the seat. Maguire died in early 1981.

The ensuing by-election took place amidst the 1981 Irish Hunger Strike. As part of the campaign for the five demands of the prisoners, the Provisional Irish Republican Army Officer Commanding in the Maze prison, Bobby Sands, was nominated as an Anti-H-Block/Armagh Political Prisoner candidate. Harry West stood for the UUP, but no other candidates contested the by-election. On 9 April 1981, Sands won with 30,492 votes against 29,046 for West. 26 days later Sands died on hunger strike. Speedy legislation barred prisoners serving a sentence of 12 months or longer from standing for Parliament, and so in the second by-election Sands's agent Owen Carron stood as a "Proxy Political Prisoner". The UUP nominated Ken Maginnis. The second by-election in August was also contested by the Alliance Party of Northern Ireland, the Workers' Party Republican Clubs, a candidate standing on a label of General Amnesty and another as The Peace Lover. The turnout was even higher, with most of the additional votes going to the additional parties standing, and Carron was elected. In the 1982 election for the Northern Ireland Assembly, Carron headed the Sinn Féin slate for the constituency and was elected.

Republicans suffered a reversal in the 1983 general election, when the SDLP contested the seat. Maginnis won and held the seat for the UUP for the next eighteen years until he retired. By this point boundary changes had resulted in a broad 50:50 balance between unionists and nationalists and it was expected that a single unionist candidate would hold the seat in the 2001 general election. James Cooper was nominated by the UUP. On this occasion, however, both the nationalist and unionist votes were to be split. Initially, Maurice Morrow of the DUP was nominated to stand, with the DUP fiercely opposing the UUP's support for the Good Friday Agreement. Morrow then withdrew in favour of Jim Dixon, a survivor of the Enniskillen bombing who stood as an Independent Unionist opposed to the Agreement. Tommy Gallagher of the SDLP ran, but his intervention did not do enough damage to Sinn Féin. Sinn Féin's Michelle Gildernew won by 53 votes over Cooper. Subsequently, the result was challenged amid allegations that a polling station had been kept open by force for longer than the deadline, allowing more people to vote, but the courts—while conceding that this happened—did not uphold the challenge, because it held that the votes cast after the legal closing time would not have affected the outcome.

Ahead of the 2005 general election, there was speculation that a single unionist candidate could retake the seat. The UUP and DUP, however, ran opposing candidates and in the event Gildernew held her seat. She kept the seat at the 2010 general election by four votes over the Unionist candidate, Rodney Connor. Following the election, Connor lodged an election petition challenging the result, based on a dispute about differences in the number of ballot papers recorded at polling stations and those subsequently recorded at the count centre. The petition was rejected after it was found that only three extra votes remained unaccounted for. The judge ruled that "even if those votes were introduced in breach of the rules and if they had all been counted in favour of the first respondent their exclusion would still have given the first respondent (Ms Gildernew) a majority of one vote and the result would not have been affected."

In the 2015 general election Sinn Féin's Michelle Gildernew lost the seat to the UUP's candidate Tom Elliott. Although Elliott was running for the UUP, he was also being actively supported by the DUP, the Traditional Unionist Voice and the UK Independence Party. The Conservative Party also refused to run a candidate in Fermanagh and South Tyrone, despite running in 16 out of the other 17 constituencies. Just as in the February 1974 and 1983 elections, faced with a single Unionist candidate, the SDLP refused to discuss a nationalist pact with Sinn Féin.

Gildernew re-captured her seat in the 2017 general election. In the 2019 general election she was re-elected with a majority of just 57 votes (the narrowest result in the UK), despite the DUP withdrawing and the SDLP standing a candidate. This made the 2019 election the second time in under ten years that Fermanagh and South Tyrone has been the seat with the smallest winning majority in the UK.

In the 2024 general election, Royal College of Nursing chief Pat Cullen announced that she would contest the seat representing Sinn Féin. Cullen won the seat, with a majority of 4,486 votes despite being against single unionist candidate, Diana Armstrong of the UUP. Cullen increased Sinn Féin's vote share in Fermanagh South Tyrone by 6.7%, securing the largest Nationalist majority since the 2005 general election.

== Boundaries ==
Under the Representation of the People Act 1948, all two-member constituencies were divided. The old two-member Fermanagh and Tyrone was replaced by Fermanagh and South Tyrone and Mid Ulster (which also took territory from the old Londonderry constituency. These changes took effect at the 1950 general election. On its establishment, it included all of County Fermanagh and the southern part of County Tyrone. Of the post-1973 districts, it contained all of Fermanagh and Dungannon. In boundary changes resulting from a review in 1995, a section of the Dungannon district, around the town of Coalisland, was transferred to Mid Ulster.

1950–1983: County Fermanagh; the urban district of Dungannon; the rural districts of Clogher and Dungannon, and that part of the rural district of Omagh consisting of the district electoral divisions of Aghafad, Dervaghroy, Dromore, Drumharvey, Ecclesville, Fallaghearn, Fintona, Greenan, Killskerry, Lifford, Moorfield, Rahoney, Seskinore, Tattymoyle and Trillick.

1983–1997: The district of Fermanagh; and the district of Dungannon.

1997–2024: The district of Fermanagh; and in the district of Dungannon (Dungannon and South Tyrone Borough from 1999), the wards of Augher, Aughnacloy, Ballygawley, Ballysaggart, Benburb, Caledon, Castlecaulfield, Clogher, Coolhill, Drumglass, Fivemiletown, Killyman, Killymeal, Moy, Moygashel, and Mullaghmore.

2024–present: In Armagh City, Banbridge and Craigavon, the ward of Blackwatertown; in Fermanagh and Omagh, the wards of Ballinamallard, Belcoo and Garrison, Belleek and Boa, Boho, Cleenish and Letterbreen, Brookeborough, Castlecoole, Derrygonnelly, Derrylin, Donagh, Ederney and Kesh, Erne, Florence Court and Kinawley, Irvinestown, Lisbellaw, Lisnarrick, Lisnaskea, Maguiresbridge, Newtownbutler, Portora, Rosslea, Rossorry, and Tempo; and in Mid Ulster, the wards of Augher and Clogher, Aughnacloy, Ballygawley, Ballysaggart, Caledon, the part of the Castlecaulfield ward lies to the south of the northern boundary of the 1997–2024 Fermanagh and South Tyrone constituency, Fivemiletown, Killymeal, Moy, Moygashel, and Mullaghmore.

== Members of Parliament ==
Election	MP	Party
1950	Cahir Healy	Nationalist
1951	Cahir Healy	Nationalist
1955	Philip Clarke	Sinn Féin
1955 petition	Lord Robert Grosvenor	UUP
1959	Lord Robert Grosvenor	UUP
1964	The Marquess of Hamilton	UUP
1966	The Marquess of Hamilton	UUP
1970	Frank McManus	Unity
February 1974	Harry West	UUP
October 1974	Frank Maguire	Ind. Republican
1979	Frank Maguire	Ind. Republican
April 1981 by-election	Bobby Sands	Anti H-Block
August 1981 by-election	Owen Carron	Anti H-Block
1982	Owen Carron	Sinn Féin
1983	Ken Maginnis	UUP
1986 by-election	Ken Maginnis	UUP
1987	Ken Maginnis	UUP
1992	Ken Maginnis	UUP
1997	Ken Maginnis	UUP
2001	Michelle Gildernew	Sinn Féin
2005	Michelle Gildernew	Sinn Féin
2010	Michelle Gildernew	Sinn Féin
2015	Tom Elliott	UUP
2017	Michelle Gildernew	Sinn Féin
2019	Michelle Gildernew	Sinn Féin
2024	Pat Cullen	Sinn Féin

== Elections ==
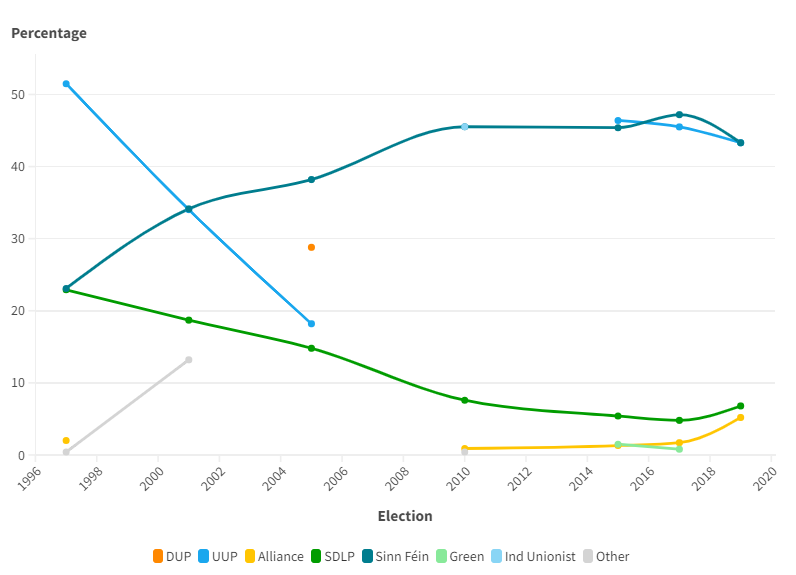

=== Elections in the 2020s ===
2024 general election: Fermanagh and South Tyrone
Party	Candidate	Votes	%	±%
Sinn Féin	Pat Cullen	24,844	48.6	+6.1
UUP	Diana Armstrong	20,273	39.7	−1.9
Alliance	Eddie Roofe	2,420	4.7	−0.7
SDLP	Paul Blake	2,386	4.7	−2.5
Labour Alternative	Gerry Cullen	624	1.2	New
Aontú	Carl Duffy	529	1.0	New
Majority		4,571	8.9	+8.8
Turnout		51,076	65.6	−4.1
Registered electors		77,828		
Sinn Féin hold		Swing	+4.0	

=== Elections in the 2010s ===
2019 general election: Fermanagh and South Tyrone
Party	Candidate	Votes	%	±%
Sinn Féin	Michelle Gildernew	21,986	43.3	−3.9
UUP	Tom Elliott	21,929	43.2	−2.3
SDLP	Adam Gannon	3,446	6.8	+2.0
Alliance	Matthew Beaumont	2,650	5.2	+3.5
Independent	Caroline Wheeler	751	1.5	New
Majority		57	0.1	−1.6
Turnout		50,762	69.7	−6.1
Registered electors		72,829		
Sinn Féin hold		Swing	−0.8	

Caroline Wheeler is a member of the United Kingdom Labour Party who ran as an independent in the seat as the Labour Party do not run in Northern Ireland.

This was the smallest majority at the 2019 general election.

2017 general election: Fermanagh and South Tyrone
Party	Candidate	Votes	%	±%
Sinn Féin	Michelle Gildernew	25,230	47.2	+1.8
UUP	Tom Elliott	24,355	45.5	−0.9
SDLP	Mary Garrity	2,587	4.8	−0.6
Alliance	Noreen Campbell	886	1.7	+0.4
Green (NI)	Tanya Jones	423	0.8	−0.7
Majority		875	1.7	N/A
Turnout		53,481	75.8	+3.2
Registered electors		70,601		
Sinn Féin gain from UUP		Swing	−1.3	

2015 general election: Fermanagh and South Tyrone
Party	Candidate	Votes	%	±%
UUP	Tom Elliott	23,608	46.4	+0.9
Sinn Féin	Michelle Gildernew	23,078	45.4	−0.1
SDLP	John Coyle	2,732	5.4	−1.8
Green (NI)	Tanya Jones	788	1.5	New
Alliance	Hannah Su	658	1.3	+0.4
Majority		530	1.0	N/A
Turnout		50,864	72.6	+3.7
Registered electors		70,108		
UUP gain from Sinn Féin		Swing	+23.3	

2010 general election: Fermanagh and South Tyrone
Party	Candidate	Votes	%	±%
Sinn Féin	Michelle Gildernew	21,304	45.52	+7.3
Ind. Unionist	Rodney Connor	21,300	45.51	New
SDLP	Fearghal McKinney	3,574	7.6	−7.2
Alliance	Vasundhara Kamble	437	0.9	New
Independent	John Stevenson	188	0.4	New
Majority		4	0.01	−9.4
Turnout		46,803	68.9	−3.7
Registered electors		67,908		
Sinn Féin hold		Swing	−19.1	

Rodney Connor had the support of the Democratic Unionist Party and the Ulster Conservatives and Unionists. Following the close result, Connor lodged an election petition against Gildernew alleging irregularities in the counting of the votes had affected the result. However the High Court found that there were only three ballot papers which could not be accounted for, and even if they were all votes for Connor, Gildernew would have had a plurality of one. The election was therefore upheld.

=== Elections in the 2000s ===
2005 general election: Fermanagh and South Tyrone
Party	Candidate	Votes	%	±%
Sinn Féin	Michelle Gildernew	18,638	38.2	+4.1
DUP	Arlene Foster	14,056	28.8	New
UUP	Tom Elliott	8,869	18.2	−15.8
SDLP	Tommy Gallagher	7,230	14.8	−3.9
Majority		4,582	9.4	+9.3
Turnout		48,793	72.6	−5.4
Registered electors		66,415		
Sinn Féin hold		Swing	−12.4	

2001 general election: Fermanagh and South Tyrone
Party	Candidate	Votes	%	±%
Sinn Féin	Michelle Gildernew	17,739	34.13	+11.0
UUP	James Leslie Cooper	17,686	34.03	−17.5
SDLP	Tommy Gallagher	9,706	18.7	−4.2
Independent	William James Dixon	6,843	13.2	New
Majority		53	0.10	N/A
Turnout		51,974	78.0	+3.2
Registered electors		61,390		
Sinn Féin gain from UUP		Swing	+14.2	

=== Elections in the 1990s ===
1997 general election: Fermanagh and South Tyrone
Party	Candidate	Votes	%	±%
UUP	Ken Maginnis	24,862	51.5	−1.0
Sinn Féin	Gerry McHugh	11,174	23.1	+4.0
SDLP	Tommy Gallagher	11,060	22.9	±0.0
Alliance	Stephen Farry	977	2.0	±0.0
Natural Law	Simeon Gillan	217	0.4	New
Majority		13,688	28.4	−1.0
Turnout		48,290	74.8	−3.7
Registered electors		59,086		
UUP hold		Swing	−8.1	

Boundary changes took effect from the 1997 general election. The projections of what the 1992 result would have been if fought on 1997 boundaries are shown below

Notional 1992 UK general election result : Fermanagh and South Tyrone
Party	Candidate	Votes	%	±%
UUP	N/A	25,740	52.5	N/A
SDLP	N/A	10,982	22.9	N/A
Sinn Féin	N/A	9,143	19.1	N/A
Others	N/A	1,841	3.8	N/A
Alliance	N/A	950	2.0	N/A
Majority		14,089	29.4	N/A

1992 general election: Fermanagh and South Tyrone
Party	Candidate	Votes	%	±%
UUP	Ken Maginnis	26,923	48.8	−0.8
SDLP	Tommy Gallagher	12,810	23.2	+4.1
Sinn Féin	Francie Molloy	12,604	22.9	−3.5
Independent Progressive Socialist	David Kettyles	1,094	2.0	New
Alliance	Eric Bullick	950	1.7	±0.0
New Agenda (Ireland)	Gerry Cullen	747	1.4	New
Majority		14,113	25.6	+2.4
Turnout		55,128	78.5	−1.8
Registered electors		70,253		
UUP hold		Swing		

=== Elections in the 1980s ===
1987 general election: Fermanagh and South Tyrone
Party	Candidate	Votes	%	±%
UUP	Ken Maginnis	27,446	49.6	+2.0
Sinn Féin	Paul Corrigan	14,623	26.4	−8.4
SDLP	Rosemary Flanagan	10,581	19.1	+2.6
Workers' Party	David Kettyles	1,784	3.2	+2.1
Alliance	John Haslett	950	1.7	New
Majority		12,823	23.2	+10.4
Turnout		55,834	80.3	−8.3
Registered electors		68,979		
UUP hold		Swing		

By-election 1986: Fermanagh and South Tyrone
Party	Candidate	Votes	%	±%
UUP	Ken Maginnis	27,857	49.7	+2.1
Sinn Féin	Owen Carron	15,278	27.2	−7.6
SDLP	Austin Currie	12,081	21.5	+5.0
Workers' Party	David Kettyles	864	1.5	−0.4
Majority		12,579	22.5	+9.7
Turnout		56,080	80.4	−8.2
Registered electors		69,767		
UUP hold		Swing		

1983 general election: Fermanagh and South Tyrone
Party	Candidate	Votes	%	±%
UUP	Ken Maginnis	28,630	47.6	+19.6
Sinn Féin	Owen Carron	20,954	34.8	N/A
SDLP	Rosemary Flanagan	9,923	16.5	New
Workers' Party	David Kettyles	649	1.1	New
Majority		7,676	12.8	N/A
Turnout		60,156	88.6	+1.5
Registered electors		67,842		
UUP gain from Anti H-Block		Swing		

Minor boundary changes took effect from the 1983 general election.

By-election August 1981: Fermanagh and South Tyrone
Party	Candidate	Votes	%	±%
Anti H-Block	Owen Carron	31,278	49.1	−2.1
UUP	Ken Maginnis	29,048	45.6	−3.2
Alliance	Seamus Close	1,930	3.0	New
Republican Clubs	Tom Moore	1,132	1.8	New
General Amnesty	Martin Green	249	0.4	New
The Peace Lover	Simon Hall-Raleigh	90	0.1	New
Majority		2,230	3.5	+1.1
Turnout		63,727	88.6	+1.7
Registered electors		73,161		
Anti H-Block hold		Swing		

By-election April 1981: Fermanagh and South Tyrone
Party	Candidate	Votes	%	±%
Anti H-Block	Bobby Sands	30,492	51.2	New
UUP	Harry West	29,046	48.8	+20.8
Majority		1,447	2.4	N/A
Turnout		59,538	86.9	−0.2
Registered electors		72,349		
Anti H-Block gain from Ind. Republican		Swing		

=== Elections in the 1970s ===
1979 general election: Fermanagh and South Tyrone
Party	Candidate	Votes	%	±%
Ind. Republican	Frank Maguire	22,398	36.0	−15.8
UUP	Raymond Ferguson	17,411	28.0	−19.9
Independent SDLP	Austin Currie	10,785	17.3	New
UUUP	Ernest Baird	10,607	17.0	New
Alliance	Peter Newton Acheson	1,070	1.7	New
Majority		4,987	8.0	+4.1
Turnout		62,271	87.1	−1.6
Registered electors		71,481		
Ind. Republican hold		Swing		

October 1974 general election: Fermanagh and South Tyrone
Party	Candidate	Votes	%	±%
Ind. Republican	Frank Maguire	32,795	51.8	New
UUP	Harry West	30,285	47.9	+4.3
Marxist–Leninist	Alan John Evans	185	0.3	New
Majority		2,510	3.9	N/A
Turnout		63,265	88.7	+0.3
Registered electors		71,343		
Ind. Republican gain from UUP		Swing	N/A	

February 1974 general election: Fermanagh and South Tyrone
Party	Candidate	Votes	%	±%
UUP	Harry West	26,858	43.6	−5.3
Unity	Frank McManus	16,229	26.3	−24.8
SDLP	Denis Haughey	15,410	25.0	New
Pro-Assembly Unionist	Hubert Irvin Brown	3,157	5.1	New
Majority		10,629	17.3	N/A
Turnout		61,654	88.4	−3.7
Registered electors		69,775		
UUP gain from Unity		Swing		

1970 general election: Fermanagh and South Tyrone
Party	Candidate	Votes	%	±%
Unity	Frank McManus	32,837	51.1	+24.2
UUP	James Hamilton	31,390	48.9	−5.1
Majority		1,447	2.2	N/A
Turnout		64,227	92.1	+6.1
Registered electors		70,381		
Unity gain from UUP		Swing		

=== Elections in the 1960s ===
1966 general election: Fermanagh and South Tyrone
Party	Candidate	Votes	%	±%
UUP	James Hamilton	29,352	54.0	−1.1
Unity	James J. Donnelly	14,645	26.9	New
Ind. Republican	Ruairí Ó Brádaigh	10,370	19.1	−10.5
Majority		14,707	27.1	+1.6
Turnout		54,367	86.0	+0.1
Registered electors		63,188		
UUP hold		Swing		

1964 general election: Fermanagh and South Tyrone
Party	Candidate	Votes	%	±%
UUP	James Hamilton	30,010	55.1	−26.3
Ind. Republican	Aloysius Mulloy	16,138	29.6	New
Ulster Liberal	Giles FitzHerbert	6,006	11.0	New
NI Labour	Baptist W. Gamble	2,339	4.3	New
Majority		13,872	25.5	−37.3
Turnout		54,493	85.9	+24.3
Registered electors		63,642		
UUP hold		Swing	N/A	

=== Elections in the 1950s ===
1959 general election: Fermanagh and South Tyrone
Party	Candidate	Votes	%	±%
UUP	Robert Grosvenor	32,080	81.4	+31.6
Sinn Féin	James Martin	7,348	18.6	−31.6
Majority		24,732	62.8	+62.4
Turnout		39,428	61.6	−31.0
Registered electors		64,022		
UUP gain from Sinn Féin		Swing		

1955 general election: Fermanagh and South Tyrone
Party	Candidate	Votes	%	±%
Sinn Féin	Philip Clarke	30,529	50.2	New
UUP	Robert Grosvenor	30,268	49.8	+0.9
Majority		261	0.4	N/A
Turnout		60,797	92.6	−0.8
Registered electors		65,770		
Sinn Féin gain from Irish Nationalist		Swing		

After the election, Philip Clarke was found ineligible by an election court, and Lord Robert Grosvenor was declared elected in his place.

1951 general election: Fermanagh and South Tyrone
Party	Candidate	Votes	%	±%
Nationalist	Cahir Healy	32,717	52.1	+0.2
UUP	Frederick Patterson	30,268	47.9	−0.2
Majority		2,635	4.2	+0.4
Turnout		62,985	93.4	+1.3
Registered electors		67,219		
Nationalist hold		Swing		

1950 general election: Fermanagh and South Tyrone
Party	Candidate	Votes	%	±%
Nationalist	Cahir Healy	32,188	51.9	
UUP	Henry Richardson	29,877	48.1	
Majority		2,311	3.8	
Turnout		62,065	92.1	
Registered electors		67,424		
Nationalist win (new seat)				

== Demographics ==
On census day 2021 there were 111,790 people living in the Fermanagh and South Tyrone constituency. Of these:

- 60.4% (67,560) belong to or were brought up in the Catholic Christian faith and 33.7% (37,711) belong to or were brought up in various 'Protestant and Other Christian (including Christian related)' denominations. 1.0% (1,107) belong to other religions and 4.8% (5,412) had no religious background.
- 24.4% (27,263) indicated that they had a British-only identity, 37.1% (41,447) had an Irish-only identity and 19.2% (21,439) had a Northern Irish–only identity (respondents could indicate more than one national identity).

== Sources ==
- F. W. S. Craig, British Parliamentary Election Results 1918–1949
- F. W. S. Craig, British Parliamentary Election Results 1950–1970
