= Frank McManus (Irish politician) =

Irish nationalist politician (born 1942)

Member of Parliament for Fermanagh and South Tyrone
- In office 18 June 1970 – 8 February 1974
- Preceded by: Marquess of Hamilton
- Succeeded by: Harry West

Personal details
- Born: 16 August 1942 (age 83) Kinawley, County Fermanagh, Northern Ireland
- Party: Unity (1970–1977)
- Other political affiliations: Irish Independence Party (1977–1985)

Francis McManus (born 16 August 1942) is an Irish nationalist former Member of Parliament in the British House of Commons.

== Background ==
Born in Kinawley, County Fermanagh, he is a brother of Father Seán McManus, the Irish-American lobbyist and Catholic priest, and Pat McManus, a member of the IRA killed in an explosion in 1958.

He received his secondary education at St. Michael's College, Enniskillen; he later attended Queen's University, Belfast before becoming a solicitor. In the late 1960s, he became the chair of the Fermanagh Civil Rights Association.

McManus was elected at the 1970 general election, as the Unity candidate for Fermanagh and South Tyrone. On 3 July 1970, in order to be able to enter parliament, he swore the Oath of Allegiance to Queen Elizabeth II. Following the introduction of internment, he chaired the meeting on 17 October 1971 where the Northern Resistance Movement was founded. On 19 April 1972, during a debate on the report of the Widgery Tribunal, he called Bloody Sunday "the greatest single outrage that has been perpetrated in our country for a long time" and the Widgery inquiry "a spurious and desperate attempt to whitewash the activities of the Army on that Sunday". He asked prime minister Edward Heath if he agreed it was crucial to ensure that the world would not gain the impression of the British government sharing Widgery's view that had there been no civil rights march in Derry, 13 people would not have lost their life that day.

McManus lost his seat at the February 1974 general election to Ulster Unionist Party (UUP) candidate Harry West, when the Social Democratic and Labour Party also stood a candidate, which resulted in a split nationalist vote. In 1977, he was a founder member of the short-lived Irish Independence Party.

He is a retired solicitor in Lisnaskea and a trustee of the Fermanagh Trust.

Parliament of the United Kingdom
Preceded by Marquess of Hamilton	Member of Parliament for Fermanagh and South Tyrone; 1970–1974	Succeeded by Harry West
