= 1986 Fermanagh and South Tyrone by-election =

UK Parliamentary by-election

← 1983	23 January 1986	1987 →

Constituency of Fermanagh and South Tyrone
- Turnout: 80.4% (▼8.2%)
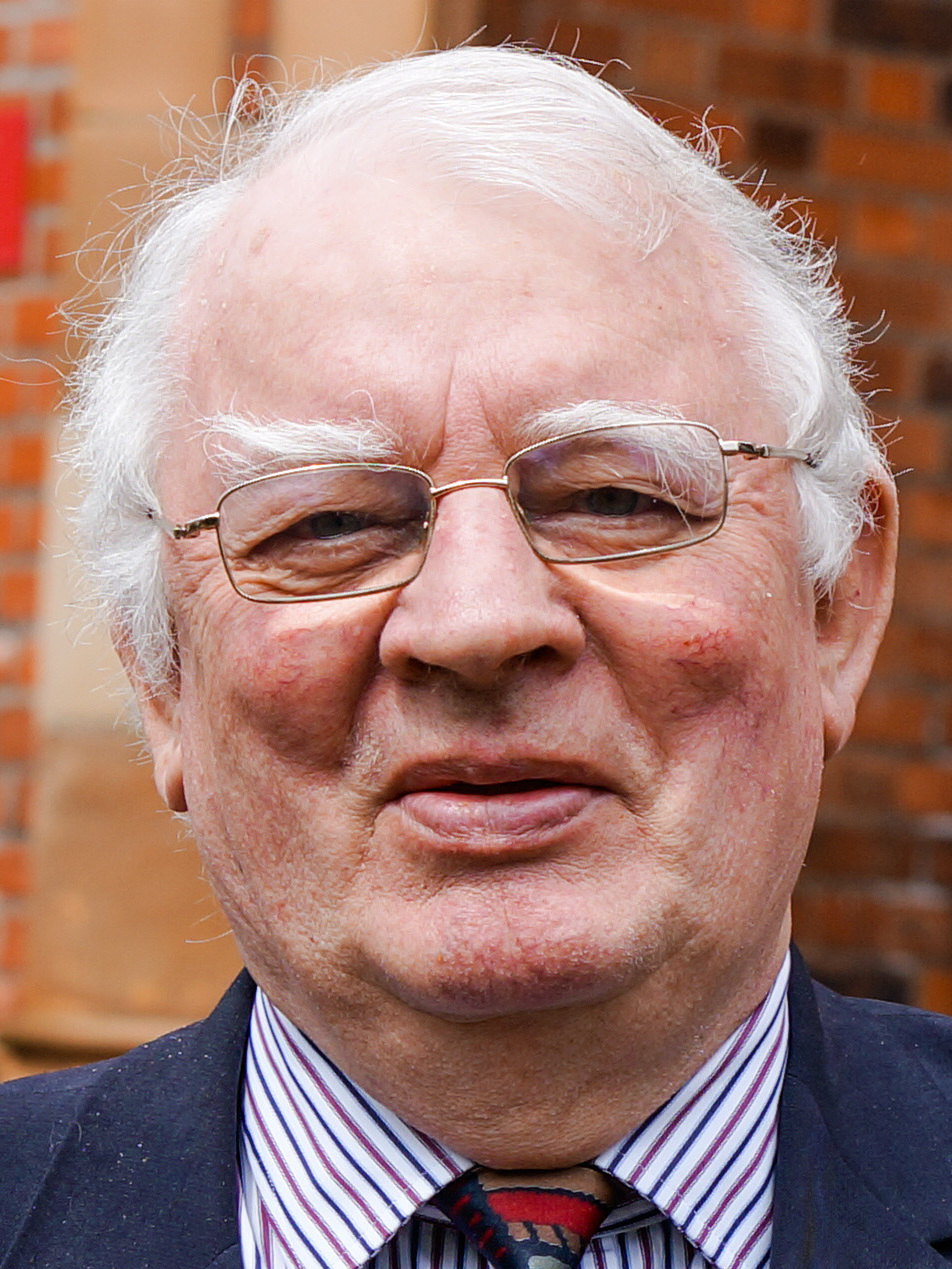
	First party	Second party	Third party
	UUP	SF
Candidate	Ken Maginnis	Owen Carron	Austin Currie
Party	UUP	Sinn Féin	SDLP
Popular vote	27,857	15,278	12,081
Percentage	49.7%	27.2%	21.5%
Swing	▲2.1%	▼7.6%	▲5.0%
MP before election
Ken Maginnis
UUP
Elected MP
Ken Maginnis
UUP

The 1986 Fermanagh and South Tyrone by-election was one of the fifteen 1986 Northern Ireland by-elections held on 23 January 1986, to fill vacancies in the Parliament of the United Kingdom caused by the resignation in December 1985 of all sitting Unionist Members of Parliament (MPs). The MPs, from the Ulster Unionist Party, Democratic Unionist Party and Ulster Popular Unionist Party, did this to highlight their opposition to the Anglo-Irish Agreement. Each of their parties agreed not to contest seats previously held by the others, and each outgoing MP stood for re-election.

The Ulster Unionist candidate Ken Maginnis was able to survive with less than 50% of the vote due to a split Nationalist vote.

1986 Fermanagh and South Tyrone by-election
Party	Candidate	Votes	%	±%
UUP	Ken Maginnis	27,857	49.7	+2.1
Sinn Féin	Owen Carron	15,278	27.2	−7.6
SDLP	Austin Currie	12,081	21.5	+5.0
Workers' Party	David Kettyles	864	1.5	−0.4
Majority		12,579	22.5	+9.7
Turnout		56,080	80.4	−8.2
Registered electors		69,767		
UUP hold		Swing		

== Other References ==
- British Parliamentary By Elections: Campaign literature from the by-elections
- CAIN: Westminster By-Elections (NI) - Thursday 23 January 1986
- Northern Ireland Elections: Westminster by-elections 1986
