= South Fermanagh (Northern Ireland Parliament constituency) =

Coordinates: 54.339°N 7.850°W

- Former County constituency for the Parliament of Northern Ireland
- South Fermanagh shown within Northern Ireland

Former constituency
- Created: 1929
- Abolished: 1973
- Election method: First past the post

South Fermanagh was a constituency of the Parliament of Northern Ireland.

== Boundaries ==
Fermanagh South was a county constituency comprising the southern part of County Fermanagh. It was created in 1929 when the House of Commons (Method of Voting and Redistribution of Seats) Act (Northern Ireland) 1929 introduced first-past-the-post elections throughout Northern Ireland. Fermanagh South was created by the division of Fermanagh and Tyrone into eight new constituencies, of which three were in County Fermanagh. The constituency survived unchanged, returning one member of Parliament until the Parliament of Northern Ireland was temporarily suspended in 1972, and then formally abolished in 1973.

== Politics ==
Unlike the other seats in County Fermanagh, South Fermanagh was a strongly nationalist area. The seat was consistently won by the Nationalist Party candidate, who, for most of its existence, was the party leader, Cahir Healy. It was only contested on two occasions: in 1949 by an Ulster Unionist Party candidate, and in 1969 by a People's Democracy candidate.

== Members of Parliament ==
Elected	Party	Name
1929	Nationalist	Cahir Healy
1965	Nationalist	John Carron

== Election results ==
At the 1929, 1933, 1938 and 1945 general elections, Cahir Healy was elected unopposed.

General Election 10 February 1949: Fermanagh South
Party	Candidate	Votes	%	±%
Nationalist	Cahir Healy	6,680	72.0	N/A
UUP	F. G. Patterson	2,596	28.0	New
Majority		9,276	44.0	N/A
Turnout		6,208	86.6	N/A
Nationalist hold		Swing	N/A	

At the 1953, 1958 and 1962 general elections, Cahir Healy was elected unopposed.

At the 1965 Northern Ireland general election, John Carron was elected unopposed.

General Election 24 February 1969: Fermanagh South
Party	Candidate	Votes	%	±%
Nationalist	John Carron	4,108	66.2	N/A
People's Democracy	P. J. Cosgrove	2,100	33.8	New
Majority		2,008	32.4	N/A
Turnout		6,208	74.6	N/A
Nationalist hold		Swing	N/A	

- Parliament prorogued 30 March 1972 and abolished 18 July 1973
