= Bobby Sands =

Irish Provisional IRA member (1954–1981)

- Roibeárd Ó Seachnasaigh
- Sands in Long Kesh, 1973 (aged 18–19)

Member of Parliament for Fermanagh and South Tyrone
- In office 9 April 1981 – 5 May 1981
- Preceded by: Frank Maguire
- Succeeded by: Owen Carron

Personal details
- Born: Robert Gerard Sands; 9 March 1954 Dunmurry, County Antrim, Northern Ireland
- Died: 5 May 1981 (aged 27) HM Prison Maze, County Down, Northern Ireland
- Cause of death: Hunger strike
- Party: Anti H-Block
- Spouse: Geraldine Noade (m. 1973)
- Children: 1
- Relatives: Bernadette Sands McKevitt (sister)

Military service
- Allegiance: Provisional Irish Republican Army
- Years of service: 1972–1981
- Unit: First Battalion South West Belfast, Belfast Brigade
- Battles/wars: The Troubles

Robert Gerard Sands (Irish: Roibeárd Gearóid Ó Seachnasaigh; 9 March 1954 – 5 May 1981) was a member of the Provisional Irish Republican Army (IRA) who died on hunger strike while imprisoned at HM Prison Maze in Northern Ireland. Sands helped to plan the 1976 Balmoral Furniture Company bombing in Dunmurry, which was followed by a gun battle with the Royal Ulster Constabulary. Sands was arrested while trying to escape and sentenced to 14 years for firearms possession.

He was the leader of the 1981 hunger strike in which Irish republican prisoners protested against the removal of Special Category Status. During Sands's strike, he was elected to the UK Parliament as an Anti H-Block candidate. His death and those of nine hunger strikers were followed by a surge of IRA recruitment and activity. International media coverage brought attention to the hunger strikers, and the republican movement in general, attracting both praise and criticism.

== Early life ==
Robert Gerard Sands was born on 9 March 1954 in Dunmurry, County Antrim, to John and Rosaleen Sands. After marrying, they relocated to the new development of Abbots Cross, Newtownabbey, County Antrim, outside North Belfast. Sands was the eldest of four children. His younger sisters, Marcella and Bernadette, were born in 1955 and 1958 respectively. He also had a younger brother, John, born in 1962.

In 1961, after experiencing harassment and intimidation from their neighbours, the family abandoned the development and moved in with friends for six months before being granted housing in the nearby Rathcoole development. Rathcoole was 30% Catholic and featured Catholic schools as well as a nominally Catholic, but religiously mixed, youth football club, an unusual circumstance in Northern Ireland, known as Stella Maris, the same as the school Sands attended and where the training was held. Sands was a member of this club and played left-back. There was another youth club in nearby Greencastle, called Star of the Sea, and many boys went there when the Stella Maris club closed.

By 1966, sectarian violence in Rathcoole, along with the rest of the Belfast metropolitan area, had considerably worsened, and the minority Catholic population there found itself under siege. Despite always having had Protestant friends, Sands suddenly found that none of them would even speak to him and he quickly learned to associate only with Catholics.

He left school in 1969 at age 15 and enrolled in Newtownabbey Technical College, beginning an apprenticeship as a coach builder at Alexander's Coach Works in 1970. He worked there for less than a year, enduring constant harassment from his Protestant co-workers, which according to several co-workers he ignored completely since he wished to learn a meaningful trade. He was eventually confronted after leaving his shift in January 1971 by a number of his co-workers wearing the armbands of the local Ulster loyalist tartan gang. He was held at gunpoint and told that Alexander's was off-limits to "Fenian scum" and never to come back if he valued his life. He later said that this event was the point at which he decided that militancy was the only solution. In late 1971 while working as a barman at the Glen Inn (a pub in Glengormley), Sands approached a man whom he knew to be connected to the IRA and told him he would like to join; the man told Sands to think it over as things in Rathcoole were bad and Catholics in the area were very isolated. Later that year the man from the pub spotted Sands playing football on a pitch near the Sands house. As an initiation he asked Sands to transport a gun from Rathcoole to Glengormley because the local IRA volunteer who was supposed to do the job had failed to show up. Sands left the game on the spot, changed clothes and took the gun. This is when Sands's involvement with the IRA began in earnest, according to O'Hearn:

Sands soon recruited some of his mates into a small auxiliary unit of six or seven volunteers. Bobby was their section leader. They were isolated so they worked with other volunteers from surrounding areas.

In June 1972, Sands's parents' home was attacked and damaged by a loyalist mob and they were again forced to move, this time to the West Belfast Catholic area of Twinbrook, where Sands, now thoroughly embittered, rejoined them. By 1973 almost every Catholic family had been driven out of Rathcoole by violence and intimidation, although there were some who remained.

== Provisional IRA activity ==
Sands was arrested and charged in October 1972 with possession of four handguns found in the house where he was staying. He was convicted in April 1973, sentenced to five years imprisonment, and released in April 1976.

Upon his release, he returned to his family home in West Belfast, and resumed his active role in the Provisional IRA. Sands and Joe McDonnell planned the bombing of the Balmoral Furniture Company in Dunmurry on 14 October 1976. The showroom was destroyed but as the IRA men left the scene there was a gun battle with the Royal Ulster Constabulary. Leaving behind two wounded, Seamus Martin and Gabriel Corbett, the remaining four (Sands, McDonnell, Seamus Finucane, and Sean Lavery) tried to escape by car, but were arrested. One of the revolvers used in the attack was found in the car. On 7 September 1977, the four men were sentenced to 14 years for possession of the revolver. They were not charged with explosive offences.

Immediately after his sentencing, Sands was implicated in a fight and sent to the punishment block in Crumlin Road Prison. The cells contained a bed, a mattress, a chamber pot and a water container. Books, radios and other personal items were not permitted, although a Bible and some Catholic pamphlets were provided. Sands refused to wear a prison uniform, so was kept naked in his cell for twenty-two days without access to bedding from 7.30 am to 8.30 pm each day.

== Maze Prison years ==
In late 1980, Sands was chosen Officer Commanding of the Provisional IRA prisoners in the Maze Prison, succeeding Brendan Hughes, who was participating in the first hunger strike. Republican prisoners organised a series of protests seeking to regain their previous Special Category Status, which would free them from some ordinary prison regulations. This began with the "blanket protest" in 1976, in which the prisoners refused to wear prison uniforms and wore blankets instead. In 1978, after a number of attacks on prisoners leaving their cells to "slop out" (i.e., empty their chamber pots), this escalated into the "dirty protest", wherein prisoners refused to wash and smeared the walls of their cells with excrement. Sands wrote about the brutality of Maze prison guards: "The screws [prison guards] removed me from my cell naked and I was conveyed to the punishment block in a blacked out van. As I stepped out of the van on arrival there they grabbed me from all sides and began punching and kicking me to the ground ... they dragged me by the hair across a stretch of hard core rubble to the gate of the punishment block. The full weight of my body recoiled forward again, smashing my head against the corrugated iron covering around the gate."

== Published works ==
While in prison, Sands had several letters and articles published in the Republican paper An Phoblacht under the pseudonym "Marcella" (his sister's name). Other writings attributed to him are: Skylark Sing Your Lonely Song (1989) and One Day in My Life (1983). Sands also wrote the lyrics of "Back Home in Derry" and "McIlhatton", which were both later recorded by Christy Moore, and "Sad Song for Susan", which was also later recorded. The melody of "Back Home in Derry" was borrowed from Gordon Lightfoot's 1976 song "The Wreck of the Edmund Fitzgerald". The song itself is about the penal transportation of Irishmen in the 19th century to Van Diemen's Land (modern day Tasmania, Australia).

== Hunger strike ==
The 1981 Irish hunger strike started with Sands refusing food on 1 March 1981. Sands decided that prisoners should join the strike at staggered intervals to maximise publicity, with prisoners steadily deteriorating successively over several months. The hunger strike centred on five demands:

1. the right not to wear a prison uniform;
2. the right not to do prison work;
3. the right of free association with other prisoners, and to organise educational and recreational pursuits;
4. the right to one visit, one letter, and one parcel per week;
5. full restoration of remission lost through the protest.

The significance of the hunger strike was the prisoners' aim of being considered political prisoners as opposed to criminals. Shortly before Sands's death, The Washington Post reported that the primary aim of the hunger strike was to generate international publicity.

=== Member of Parliament ===
Shortly after the beginning of the strike, Frank Maguire, the Independent Republican Member of Parliament (MP) for Fermanagh and South Tyrone, died suddenly of a heart attack, precipitating the April 1981 by-election. The sudden vacancy in a seat with a nationalist majority of about 5,000 was a valuable opportunity for Sands's supporters "to raise public consciousness". Pressure not to split the vote led other nationalist parties, notably the Social Democratic and Labour Party, to withdraw, and Sands was nominated on the label "Anti H-Block/Armagh Political Prisoner". After a highly polarised campaign, Sands narrowly won the seat on 9 April 1981, with 30,493 votes to 29,046 for the Ulster Unionist Party candidate Harry West. Sands became the youngest MP at the time. Sands died in prison less than a month later, without ever having taken his seat in the Commons.

Following Sands's election win the British government introduced the Representation of the People Act 1981, which prevents prisoners serving jail terms of more than one year in either the UK or the Republic of Ireland from being nominated as candidates in UK elections. The enactment of the law, as a response to the election of Sands, consequently prevented other hunger strikers from being elected to the House of Commons.

== Death ==
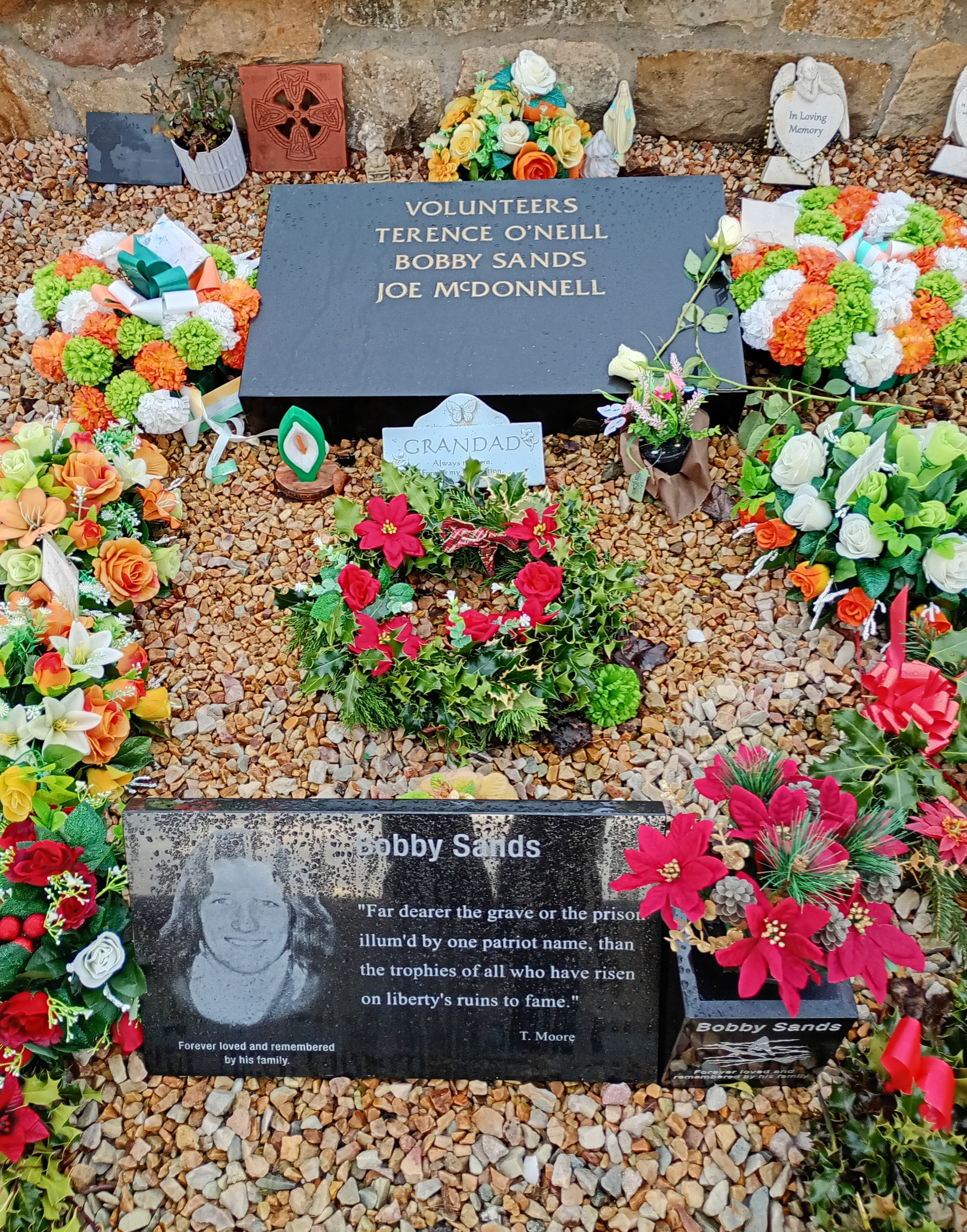
Bobby Sands's grave in Milltown Cemetery

Sands died on 5 May 1981 in the Maze's prison hospital after 66 days on hunger strike, aged 27. The original pathologist's report recorded the hunger strikers' causes of death as "self-imposed starvation", amended to simply "starvation" following protests by the dead strikers' families. The coroner recorded verdicts of "starvation, self-imposed". Sands was one of 22 Irish republicans (in the 20th century) who died on hunger strike.

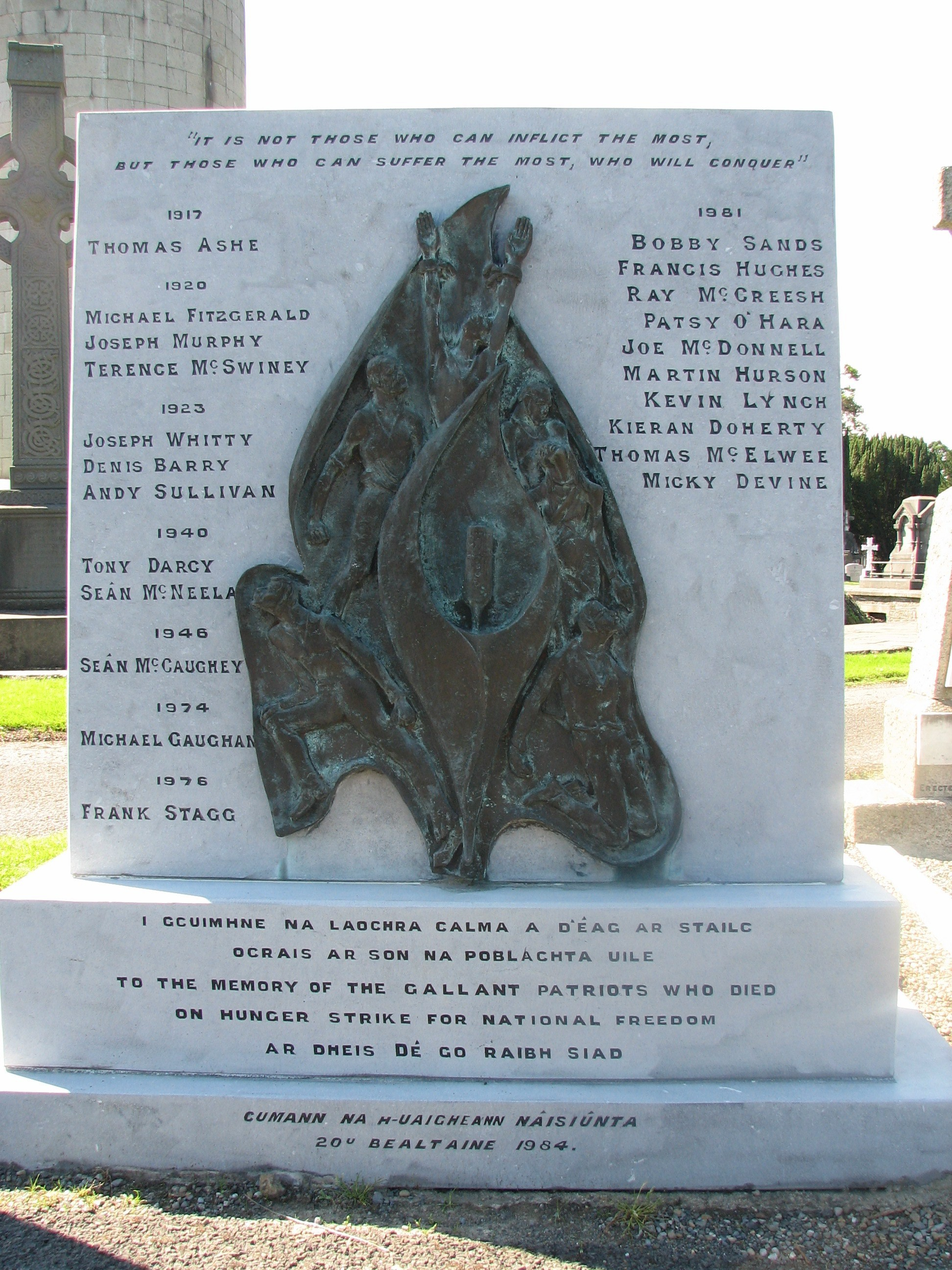
Memorial to 22 Irish Hunger Strikers Deaths Glasnevin Cemetery

Sands became a martyr to Irish republicans, and the announcement of his death prompted several days of rioting in nationalist areas of Northern Ireland. More than 100,000 people lined the route of Sands's funeral from St. Luke's Catholic Church in Twinbrook, and he was buried in the 'New Republican Plot' alongside 76 others. Their graves are maintained by the National Graves Association, Belfast.

=== Reactions ===
==== Britain ====
In response to a question in the House of Commons on 5 May 1981 the UK Prime Minister, Margaret Thatcher, said, "Mr Sands was a convicted criminal. He chose to take his own life. It was a choice that his organisation did not allow to many of its victims."

Cardinal Basil Hume, head of the Catholic Church in England and Wales, condemned Sands, describing the hunger strike as a form of violence. However he noted that this was his personal view. The Catholic Church's official stance was that ministrations should be provided to the hunger strikers who, believing their sacrifice to be for a higher good, were acting in good conscience.

At Old Firm football matches in Glasgow, Scotland, some Rangers fans have been known to sing songs mocking Sands to taunt fans of Celtic. Celtic fans are traditionally more likely to support nationalists. Celtic fans regularly sing the republican song "The Roll of Honour", which commemorates the 10 men who died in the 1981 hunger strike, amongst other songs in support of the IRA. Sands is mentioned in the line "They stood beside their leader – the gallant Bobby Sands." Rangers' taunts have since been adopted by the travelling support of other UK clubs, particularly those with strong British nationalist ties, as a form of anti-Irish sentiment. The 1981 British Home Championship football tournament was cancelled following the refusal of teams from England and Wales to travel to Northern Ireland in the aftermath of his death, due to security concerns.

==== Europe ====
In Europe, there were widespread protests after Sands's death. 5,000 Milanese students burned the Union Flag and chanted "Freedom for Ulster" during a march. The British Consulate at Ghent was raided. In Paris, thousands marched "behind a huge portrait of Sands, to chants of 'the IRA will conquer'".

In the Portuguese Parliament, the opposition stood in a minute's silence for Sands. In Oslo, one demonstrator threw a tomato at Queen Elizabeth II of the United Kingdom, but missed. In the Soviet Union, Pravda described it as "another tragic page in the grim chronicle of oppression, discrimination, terror, and violence" in Ireland. Many French towns and cities have streets named after Sands, including Nantes, Saint-Étienne, Le Mans, Vierzon, and Saint-Denis. According to Beresford, the conservative-aligned West German newspaper Die Welt took a negative view towards Sands saying "the British Government was right and [Sands] was simply trying to blackmail the state with his life".

==== Americas ====
A number of political, religious, union and fund-raising institutions chose to honour Sands in the United States. The International Longshoremen's Association in New York announced a 24-hour boycott of British ships. Over 1,000 people gathered in New York's St. Patrick's Cathedral to hear Cardinal Terence Cooke offer a reconciliation Mass for Northern Ireland. Irish pubs in the city were closed for two hours in mourning.

The New Jersey General Assembly, the lower house of the New Jersey Legislature, voted 34–29 for a resolution honouring his "courage and commitment".

The American media expressed a range of opinions on Sands's death. The Boston Globe commented, a few days before Sands's death, that "[t]he slow suicide attempt of Bobby Sands has cast his land and his cause into another downward spiral of death and despair. There are no heroes in the saga of Bobby Sands." The Chicago Tribune wrote that "Mahatma Gandhi used the hunger strike to move his countrymen to abstain from fratricide. Bobby Sands's deliberate slow suicide is intended to precipitate civil war. The former deserved veneration and influence. The latter would be viewed, in a reasonable world, not as a charismatic martyr but as a fanatical suicide, whose regrettable death provides no sufficient occasion for killing others."

In an editorial, The New York Times wrote that "Britain's prime minister Thatcher is right in refusing to yield political status to Bobby Sands, the Irish Republican Army hunger striker", but added that by appearing "unfeeling and unresponsive" the British Government was giving Sands "the crown of martyrdom". The San Francisco Chronicle argued that political belief should not exempt activists from criminal law:

Terrorism goes far beyond the expression of political belief. And dealing with it does not allow for compromise as many countries of Western Europe and United States have learned. The bombing of bars, hotels, restaurants, robbing of banks, abductions, and killings of prominent figures are all criminal acts and must be dealt with by criminal law.

Some American critics and journalists suggested that American press coverage was a "melodrama". Edward Langley of The Pittsburgh Press criticised the large pro-IRA Irish-American contingent which "swallow IRA propaganda as if it were taffy", and concluded that IRA "terrorist propaganda triumphs".

Archbishop John R. Roach, president of the National Conference of Catholic Bishops, called Sands's death "a useless sacrifice". The Ledger of 5 May 1981 claimed that the hunger strike made Sands "a hero among Irish Republicans, or nationalists, seeking the reunion of Protestant-dominated and British-ruled Northern Ireland with the independent and predominantly Catholic Irish Republic to the south". The Ledger quoted Sands as saying "If I die, God will understand" and "Tell everyone I'll see them somewhere, sometime".

==== Asia ====
In Tehran, Iran, President Abolhassan Banisadr sent a message of condolence to the Sands family.

The Iranian government renamed Winston Churchill Boulevard, the location of the Embassy of the United Kingdom in Tehran, to Bobby Sands Street, prompting the embassy to move its entrance door to Ferdowsi Street to avoid using Bobby Sands Street on its letterhead. A street in the Elahieh district is also named after Sands. An official blue and white street sign was affixed to the rear wall of the British embassy compound saying (in Persian) "Bobby Sands Street" with three words of explanation "militant Irish guerrilla". The official Pars News Agency called Bobby Sands's death "heroic". There have been claims that the British pressured Iranian authorities to change the name of Bobby Sands Street but this was denied. A burger bar in Tehran is named in honour of Sands.

Palestinian prisoners incarcerated in the Israeli desert prison of Nafha sent a letter, which was smuggled out and reached Belfast in July 1981, which read: "To the families of Bobby Sands and his martyred comrades. We, revolutionaries of the Palestinian people...extend our salutes and solidarity with you in the confrontation against the oppressive terrorist rule enforced upon the Irish people by the British ruling elite. We salute the heroic struggle of Bobby Sands and his comrades, for they have sacrificed the most valuable possession of any human being. They gave their lives for freedom."

The Hindustan Times said Margaret Thatcher had allowed a fellow Member of Parliament to die of starvation, an incident which had never before occurred "in a civilised country".

In the Indian Parliament, opposition members in the upper house Rajya Sabha stood for a minute's silence in tribute. The ruling Congress Party did not participate. Protest marches were organised against the British government and in tribute to Sands and his fellow hunger strikers.

In Hong Kong, The Standard said it was "sad that successive British governments have failed to end the last of Europe's religious wars".

=== Memorials ===
In Hartford, Connecticut, a memorial to Sands and the other hunger strikers was dedicated in 1997, the only one of its kind in the United States. Established by the Irish Northern Aid Committee and local Irish-Americans, it stands on a traffic island known as Bobby Sands Circle at the bottom of Maple Avenue near Goodwin Park. In 2001, a memorial to Sands and the other hunger strikers was unveiled in Havana, Cuba. In Providence, Rhode Island, a monument to Sands and the other hunger strikers was unveiled in May 2023. In May 2025, a statue of Sands was unveiled at the Republican Memorial Garden in Twinbrook, Belfast, to coincide with the 44th anniversary of his death.

== Political impact ==
Nine IRA and Irish National Liberation Army members who were involved in the 1981 Irish Hunger Strike died after Sands. On the day of Sands's funeral the Unionist leader, Ian Paisley, held a memorial service outside Belfast City Hall to commemorate the victims of the IRA. In the Irish general election held the same year, two anti H-block candidates won seats on an abstentionist basis.

The death of Sands resulted in a new surge of IRA activity and an immediate escalation in the Troubles, with the group obtaining many more members and increasing its fund-raising capability. Both nationalists and unionists began to harden their attitudes and move towards political extremes. Sands's Westminster seat was taken by his election agent, Owen Carron, standing as 'Anti H-Block Proxy Political Prisoner' with an increased majority. Shortly after Sands's death the Representation of the People Act 1981 was passed through parliament. As a result of the Act prisoners on hunger strike were unable to stand in the second 1981 by-election in Fermanagh and South Tyrone.

== In popular culture ==
The Éire Nua flute band, "inspired by Bobby Sands' ideals," commemorates the 1916 Easter Rising on its 91st anniversary (2017)

The Grateful Dead played at the Nassau Coliseum the night after Sands died and guitarist Bob Weir dedicated the song "He's Gone" to Sands. The concert was later released as Dick's Picks Volume 13, part of the Grateful Dead's programme of live-concert releases.

Songs written in response to the hunger strikes and Sands's death include songs by Easterhouse, Black 47, Nicky Wire, Meic Stevens, the Undertones, Eric Bogle, Soldat Louis and Christy Moore. Moore's song, "The People's Own MP", has been described as an example of a rebel song of the hero-martyr genre in which Sands's "intellectual, artistic and moral qualities" are eulogised. The US rock band Rage Against the Machine listed Sands as an inspiration in the sleeve notes of their self-titled debut album and as a "political hero" in media interviews.

Celtic F.C. received a €50,000 fine from UEFA over banners depicting Sands with a political message displayed during a game on 26 November 2013 by Green Brigade fans.

Sands has been portrayed in the following films:

- Sands was played by John Lynch in the 1996 film Some Mother's Son. It was directed by Terry George and written by George and Jim Sheridan.
- Sands was played by Mark O'Halloran in the 2001 film H3.
- Michael Fassbender played Sands in Hunger, a 2008 film by Steve McQueen about the last six weeks of Sands's life in the context of the 1981 Irish hunger strike. It premiered at the 2008 Cannes Film Festival and won McQueen the prestigious Caméra d'Or award for first-time filmmakers. It was broadcast on Channel 4 in the UK for the first time on 15 December 2009.
- The 2016 documentary film Bobby Sands: 66 Days.

== Family ==
Sands married Geraldine Noade while in prison on robbery charges on 3 March 1973. His son, Gerard, was born 8 May 1973. Noade soon left with Gerard to live in England.

Sands's sister, Bernadette Sands McKevitt, is also a prominent Irish republican. She was a founding member of the 32 County Sovereignty Movement in 1997. She opposed the Good Friday Agreement, stating that "Bobby did not die for cross-border bodies with executive powers. He did not die for nationalists to be equal British citizens within the Northern Ireland state."

His granddaughter, Erin, played for the County Down team which won the All-Ireland Junior Ladies' Football Championship in 2023.

== See also ==
- List of United Kingdom MPs with the shortest service
- Terence MacSwiney – Lord Mayor of Cork in 1920 who died in Brixton Prison after a hunger strike lasting 74 days.
- Khader Adnan – Palestinian who died in Ayalon Prison after an 87 day hunger strike in 2023.

== Works cited ==
- Beresford, David (1987). Ten men dead : the story of the 1981 Irish hunger strike. London: Grafton Books. ISBN 0586065334.
- English, Richard (2003). Armed struggle: the history of the IRA. New York: Oxford University Press. ISBN 0195166051.
- Feehan, John (1985). Bobby Sands and the tragedy of Northern Ireland. Sag Harbor, NY: Permanent Press. ISBN 0932966632.
- O'Hearn, Denis (2006). Nothing but an unfinished song : Bobby Sands, the Irish hunger striker who ignited a generation. New York: Nation Books. ISBN 978-1560258421.

Parliament of the United Kingdom
| Preceded by Frank Maguire | MP for Fermanagh and South Tyrone; 9 April – 5 May 1981 | Succeeded by Owen Carron |
| Preceded by Stephen Dorrell | Baby of the House; 9 April – 5 May 1981 | Succeeded by Owen Carron |
