= August 1981 Fermanagh and South Tyrone by-election =

UK parliamentary by-election

← Apr 1981	20 August 1981	1983 →

Fermanagh and South Tyrone constituency
- Turnout: 88.6% ▲1.7pp
	First party	Second party
	AHB	UUP
Candidate	Owen Carron	Ken Maginnis
Party	Anti H-Block	UUP
Popular vote	31,278	29,048
Percentage	49.1%	45.6%
Swing	▼2.1 pp	▼3.2 pp
MP before election
Bobby Sands
Anti H-Block
Subsequent MP
Owen Carron
Anti H-Block

The August 1981 Fermanagh and South Tyrone by-election was the second by-election in the same year, held in Fermanagh and South Tyrone on 20 August 1981. It was seen by many as a rerun of the earlier contest in April. The by-election was caused by the death of the IRA hunger striker and MP Bobby Sands.

== Background of the constituency ==
The constituency, based on the districts of Fermanagh and Dungannon, was created in 1950 and had seen a series of closely fought elections between unionist and Irish nationalist candidates, with several elections being won due to the absence of competing candidates on one side or the other.

The April by-election was a straight contest between Sands, standing as "Anti-H-Block/Armagh Political Prisoner" and the former Ulster Unionist Party MP and leader Harry West, with no other candidates standing. Sands won with a majority of 1,446 (with 3,280 spoilt ballot papers).

== Candidates in the 1981 by-election ==
Following Sands' victory and death shortly afterwards, the British government passed the Representation of the People Act barring prisoners from standing for Parliament. As a result, another prisoner on hunger strike could not be nominated. Instead Owen Carron, who had served as Sands' agent in the earlier election, was nominated as an "Anti-H-Block Proxy Political Prisoner".

The Ulster Unionists nominated a new candidate, Ken Maginnis, who had recently retired from the Ulster Defence Regiment with the rank of Major. Maginnis was on the liberal wing of the party, and was unusual amongst Ulster Unionist candidates in that he had never been a member of the Orange Order.

The new by-election also saw four additional candidates stand. Seamus Close stood for the Alliance Party of Northern Ireland even though this was traditionally one of their weakest areas. Tom Moore stood for the Workers Party Republican Clubs who were associated with the Official IRA. Two fringe candidates also stood: Martin Green on a "General Amnesty" ticket and Simon Hall-Raleigh as "The Peace Lover."

== Result ==
August 1981 Fermanagh and South Tyrone by-election
Party	Candidate	Votes	%	±%
Anti H-Block	Owen Carron	31,278	49.1	−2.1
UUP	Ken Maginnis	29,048	45.6	−3.2
Alliance	Seamus Close	1,930	3.0	N/A
Republican Clubs	Tom Moore	1,132	1.8	N/A
General Amnesty	Martin Green	249	0.4	N/A
The Peace Lover	Simon Hall-Raleigh	90	0.1	N/A
Majority		2,230	3.5	−4.5
Turnout		63,727	88.6	+1.7
Registered electors		73,161		
Anti H-Block hold		Swing		

There were 804 spoilt votes.

Compared to the April election, turnout rose by 1.7%, whilst there were over two and a half thousand fewer spoilt papers. Most of these additional votes went to the additional parties standing.
