= Owen Carron =

Irish republican activist (born 1953)

Member of Parliament for Fermanagh and South Tyrone
- In office 20 August 1981 – 13 May 1983
- Preceded by: Bobby Sands
- Succeeded by: Ken Maginnis

Personal details
- Born: 9 February 1953 (age 73) Erne Hospital, Enniskillen, County Fermanagh, Northern Ireland
- Party: Sinn Féin
- Other political affiliations: Anti H-Block (1981)
- Occupation: Teacher
- Website: Bobby Sands Trust

Owen Gerard Carron (born 9 February 1953) is an Irish republican activist who was Member of Parliament (MP) for Fermanagh and South Tyrone from 1981 to 1983.

== Early life ==
Carron was born in Enniskillen, County Fermanagh. He qualified as a teacher in the 1970s. He is a nephew of Nationalist Party politician John Carron.

== Political career ==
He became involved in Irish republican politics in the late 1970s through the Fermanagh Anti H-Block committee.

=== Election agent for Bobby Sands ===
Carron was Bobby Sands' election agent for the April 1981 Fermanagh and South Tyrone by-election. Sands, a Republican prisoner on hunger strike, won the election, but died soon afterward. Changes in election law with the passing of the Representation of the People Act 1981 made it impossible to nominate another prisoner, so Carron stood as the "Anti H-Block/Proxy Political Prisoner".

=== Election as MP ===
Carron was elected in the August by-election with an increased majority but with fewer votes, becoming the youngest MP at the time. Like most other Irish republicans elected to the British Parliament, he was an abstentionist. He never made a secret of his support for Sinn Féin; confirmation of this came when he was elected to the Northern Ireland Assembly in October 1982 as a Sinn Féin candidate. At the 1983 general election he stood again, this time officially for Sinn Féin, but owing to the nomination of a candidate by the Social Democratic and Labour Party, the nationalist vote in the constituency was seriously split, and Carron lost the seat to Ken Maginnis of the Ulster Unionist Party.

== Arrests in the United States and later life ==
Carron, along with Danny Morrison, was arrested on 21 January 1982 whilst attempting to enter the United States illegally from Canada by car. Two Canadian supporters also faced charges for trying to smuggle the men in. After spending a week in a federal jail, he was deported, and later both men were convicted on a charge of making false and fictitious statements to American immigration officials.

In 1986, an AK47 rifle was found in a car in which Carron was travelling. He was charged, but granted bail to contest the 1986 Fermanagh and South Tyrone by-election. He lost the election, skipped bail and moved to County Leitrim in the Republic of Ireland. He was arrested in 1988 in the Republic, and held in custody for two-and-a-half years while extradition procedures initiated by the British government took place. These procedures were unsuccessful when it was found by the Irish Supreme Court that possession of an automatic rifle constituted a 'political offence', thus prohibiting his extradition under Irish law. Following Carron's release he worked as a builder before returning to teaching in 1995, and later became the principal of the national school in Carrigallen.

In 2002, his name was reported as having been submitted to the British government by Sinn Féin on a list of IRA members to be granted amnesties.

He was director of elections for Councillor Martin Kenny, the Sinn Féin candidate in the Roscommon–South Leitrim constituency during the 2007 Irish general election.

Parliament of the United Kingdom
Preceded by Bobby Sands	Member of Parliament for Fermanagh and South Tyrone; 1981–1983	Succeeded by Ken Maginnis
Preceded by Bobby Sands	Baby of the House; 1981–1983	Succeeded by Charles Kennedy
Northern Ireland Assembly (1982)
New assembly	MPA for Fermanagh and South Tyrone; 1982–1986	Assembly abolished
