= Harry West =

Northern Ireland politician (1917–2004)

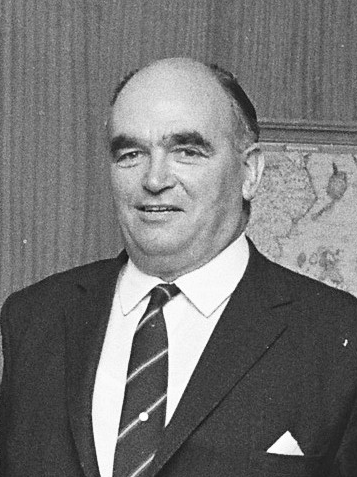
- West in 1971

10th Leader of the Ulster Unionist Party
- In office 22 January 1974 – 7 September 1979
- Preceded by: Brian Faulkner
- Succeeded by: James Molyneaux

Member of Parliament for Fermanagh and South Tyrone
- In office 28 February 1974 – 20 September 1974
- Preceded by: Frank McManus
- Succeeded by: Frank Maguire

Member of the Northern Ireland Parliament for Enniskillen
- In office 8 May 1954 – 18 July 1973
- Preceded by: Thomas Nelson
- Succeeded by: Office abolished

Personal details
- Born: 27 March 1917 Enniskillen, Ireland
- Died: 5 February 2004 (aged 86) Enniskillen, Northern Ireland
- Party: Ulster Unionist Party
- Spouse: Maureen Hall
- Children: 7, including Diana
- Profession: Farmer

Henry William West (27 March 1917 – 5 February 2004) was a Northern Irish unionist politician who served as leader of the Ulster Unionist Party (UUP) from 1974 until 1979.

== Career to Stormont ==
West was born in County Fermanagh and educated at Portora Royal School in Enniskillen. He worked as a farmer, taking an interest in local government, but it was not until 1954 that he entered Stormont as member for the Enniskillen seat, succeeding Thomas Nelson. In 1960 he was appointed Minister of Agriculture in the government of Lord Brookeborough, which he was to retain under the leadership of Terence O'Neill.

He became one of a number of Stormont MPs critical of O'Neill's conciliatory approach towards Nationalists and in 1969 he had the whip withdrawn, along with William Craig. In 1971 the whip was restored under the new Ulster Unionist leader and Prime Minister of Northern Ireland Brian Faulkner. West became Minister of Agriculture once more and retained that position until the Stormont government was dissolved in 1972.

== Sunningdale ==
West emerged as a fierce critic of the negotiations that would lead to the Sunningdale Agreement, and led the "anti-White Paper" Unionists in the Northern Ireland Assembly, 1973. When in January 1974 the Ulster Unionist Council voted against Faulkner's course of action the latter was forced into resignation. West succeeded him as leader of the party and sought to regain much of the support that the party had lost to breakaway and other Unionist groupings. In the February 1974 general election West negotiated the United Ulster Unionist Coalition with the Vanguard Progressive Unionist Party, led by Craig, and the Democratic Unionist Party, led by Ian Paisley, which would put up a single anti-Sunningdale Unionist candidate in all twelve constituencies on a platform of abolishing the power-sharing executive. West himself stood in Fermanagh and South Tyrone and won, albeit due to a split nationalist vote.

The UUUC campaigned fiercely for the abolition of the executive, which came about in May 1974 following a general strike. West continued to seek ways to expand unionism and recruited the ex-Conservative Member of Parliament Enoch Powell to the party. Powell stood for and won the South Down constituency in the October 1974 general election, but his opposition to the restoration of Stormont and preference for greater integration with the United Kingdom was to cause ruptures within the party. West himself lost his seat in Parliament due to a pact between Nationalists, so having the dubious distinction of being the only MP who served between the two general elections in 1974 who never served in any other Parliament, but he remained leader of the party. The UUUC lasted another few years and won the overwhelming majority of the seats in the 1975 Northern Ireland Constitutional Convention which sought to gain consensus on the future of the province. When the Vanguard Party fell apart over proposals for a voluntary coalition with the Social Democratic and Labour Party, West negotiated with Craig for the majority faction to merge into the Ulster Unionists.

The 1979 general election was relatively disappointing for the Ulster Unionists, as they won only five of the province's twelve constituencies. In June 1979 West stood as one of two candidates in the first elections to the European Parliament. However he was unsuccessful in the Single Transferable Vote constituency for the entire province and had the personal humiliations of seeing rival DUP leader Ian Paisley top the poll, fellow Ulster Unionist John Taylor win one of the seats and former Ulster Unionist member James Kilfedder performing better than West to become runner up. West resigned shortly afterwards.

== April 1981 by-election in Fermanagh and South Tyrone ==
He remained active in the Ulster Unionists for some years and was the party's unsuccessful candidate in the bitter April 1981 by-election in Fermanagh and South Tyrone caused by the death of the sitting MP Frank Maguire, West received 29,046 votes and was defeated by Bobby Sands standing on an Anti-H-Block/Armagh Political Prisoner ticket with 30,493 votes; Sands died twenty-six days after his election. West was considered to have fought a lacklustre campaign, and the UUP chose Ken Maginnis instead to fight the second by-election; although he did not win he was considered to have fought a more dynamic campaign. Afterwards West remained a member of the Ulster Unionist Council and was highly critical of his successor, James Molyneaux, for his opposition to proposals for power sharing devolution.

== Family ==
He was married to Maureen Hall and they had four sons and three daughters. He was a Presbyterian.

His daughter Diana Armstrong was co-opted to the Northern Ireland Assembly in 2024. His nephew, James Cooper, contested the 2001 general election in Fermanagh and South Tyrone for the UUP and was chairman of the Ulster Unionist Party from 2003 to 2005.

== See also ==
- List of United Kingdom MPs with the shortest service

Parliament of Northern Ireland
Preceded by Thomas Nelson	Member of Parliament for Enniskillen; 1954–1973	Parliament abolished
Northern Ireland Assembly (1973)
New assembly	Assembly Member for Fermanagh & South Tyrone; 1973–1974	Assembly abolished
Northern Ireland Constitutional Convention
New convention	Member for Fermanagh & South Tyrone; 1975–1976	Convention dissolved
Parliament of the United Kingdom
Preceded by Frank McManus	Member of Parliament for Fermanagh and South Tyrone; 1974	Succeeded by Frank Maguire
Party political offices
Preceded by John Edgar Bailey	Unionist Assistant Whip; 1958	Succeeded by William James Morgan
Preceded by Brian Faulkner	Leader of the Ulster Unionist Party; 1974–1979	Succeeded by James Molyneaux
Political offices
Preceded by John Edgar Bailey	Assistant Parliamentary Secretary at the Ministry of Finance; 1958	Succeeded by William James Morgan
Preceded by John Bailey	Parliamentary Secretary at the Ministry of Agriculture; 1958–1960	Vacant
Preceded by Robert Moore	Minister of Agriculture; 1960–1967	Succeeded by James Chichester-Clark
Preceded by Phelim O'Neill	Minister of Agriculture; 1971–1972	Office abolished
