= Representation of the People Act 1981 =

Act of the Parliament of the United Kingdom

Representation of the People Act 1981 (Note: Section 4.)
- Act of Parliament
- Parliament of the United Kingdom
- Long title: An Act to disqualify certain persons for election to the House of Commons; to make changes in the timetable for parliamentary elections; and for connected purposes.
- Citation: 1981 c. 34
- Territorial extent: United Kingdom

Dates
- Royal assent: 2 July 1981
- Commencement: 2 July 1981 (Note: Section 4(b) of the Interpretation Act 1978.)
Other legislation
| Amends | Representation of the People Act 1949 |
| Amended by | Representation of the People Act 1983 |

Status: Amended

Text of statute as originally enacted

Revised text of statute as amended

Text of the Representation of the People Act 1981 as in force today (including any amendments) within the United Kingdom, from legislation.gov.uk.

The Representation of the People Act 1981 (c. 34) is an act of the Parliament of the United Kingdom. It creates the provision for the automatic disqualification of an MP if they are imprisoned for over a year, leading to a by-election being held in their constituency.

The text of the act states that it provides:

1. for the disqualification from membership of the House of Commons of any person who is detained anywhere in the British Islands or the Republic of Ireland (or who is unlawfully at large at any time when he would otherwise be detained) for more than a year for any offence,
2. that the election or nomination of such persons shall be void, and
3. that the seat of a Member who becomes so disqualified shall be vacated.

Following the passage of the Recall of MPs Act 2015, sitting MPs imprisoned on shorter sentences can be removed from their seats via recall petitions.

== Background ==
The act was passed following the election to the Westminster Parliament of an Irish Republican Army hunger-striker, Bobby Sands, in the April 1981 Fermanagh and South Tyrone by-election, while he was serving a long term of imprisonment.

Due to the act, following the death of Sands other prisoners on hunger strike could not stand in the second 1981 by-election in Fermanagh and South Tyrone.

== See also ==
- Reform Acts
- Representation of the People Act
