= Anti H-Block =

- Leader: Collective leadership
- Founded: 1981; 45 years ago
- Dissolved: 1981; 45 years ago
- Merged into: Sinn Féin
- Ideology: Irish republicanism The Five Demands

Anti H-Block was the political label used in 1981 by supporters of the Irish republican hunger strike who were standing for election in both Northern Ireland and the Republic of Ireland. "H-Block" was a metonym for the Maze Prison and its H-shaped cell blocks, within which the hunger strike was taking place.

Bobby Sands, the first of these hunger strikers, was nominated in the Westminster April 1981 by-election in Fermanagh and South Tyrone. After his electoral victory and death, the Representation of the People Act was passed to prevent convicted prisoners serving sentences of more than one year from serving in the UK parliament. In response, Owen Carron, Sands's agent, stood as an "Anti-H-Block Proxy Political Prisoner", winning a seat in the subsequent August by-election.

In the Republic of Ireland's general election in June 1981 twelve candidates ran under the Anti H-Block banner, nine of whom were prisoners. Kieran Doherty and Paddy Agnew won seats in Cavan–Monaghan and Louth respectively, while both Joe McDonnell and Martin Hurson narrowly missed election in Sligo–Leitrim and Longford–Westmeath. Eamonn Sweeney noted that:

Altogether, H-Block candidates averaged 15% of the first-preference vote in constituencies they contested. This was a remarkable performance, given that they had been without money, television exposure (because of censorship laws), or any sympathetic media. It was probably beyond the wildest dreams of even their director of elections, Daithi O Conaill, who said the day before the election that "if the H-Block prisoner candidates get between 2,500 and 3,000 votes they will have put up a credible performance"

The successes of the Anti H-Block movement galvanised the Irish republican movement, and led to the entry the following year into mainstream electoral politics of Sinn Féin.

== Candidates in the 1981 Irish general election ==
Nine candidates were officially endorsed by the Anti H-Block committee, eight of which were imprisoned at the time.

Candidates:

Denotes candidates elected to Dáil Éireann

Constituency	Candidate	Paramilitary and political affiliation	1st Pref. votes	%	Notes
Cavan–Monaghan	Kieran Doherty	Provisional IRA – Sinn Féin	9,121	15.10	Elected on the fourth count
Clare	Tom McAllister	INLA – Irish Republican Socialist Party	2,120	4.68	
Cork North-Central	Mairéad Farrell	Provisional IRA – Sinn Féin	2,751	6.05	
Dublin West	Anthony O'Hara	INLA – Irish Republican Socialist Party	3,034	6.49	Candidate was the brother of Patsy O'Hara
Kerry North	Seán McKenna	Provisional IRA – Sinn Féin	3,860	11.26	
Longford–Westmeath	Martin Hurson	Provisional IRA – Sinn Féin	4,573	10.08	Eliminated on the sixth count
Louth	Paddy Agnew	Provisional IRA – Sinn Féin	8,368	18.29	Topped the Poll
Sligo–Leitrim	Joe McDonnell	Provisional IRA – Sinn Féin	5,639	11.82	Eliminated on fourth count
Waterford	Kevin Lynch	INLA – Irish Republican Socialist Party	3,337	7.63	
