= Opinion polling for the 1979 United Kingdom general election =

In the run-up to the 1979 general election, various organisations carried out opinion polling to gauge voting intention. Results of such polls are displayed in this article. The date range for these opinion polls are from the October general election until 3 May 1979.

== Graphical summaries ==
The chart below depicts opinion polls conducted for the 1979 United Kingdom general election.

Conservatives Labour Liberals

== National Poll Results ==
All data is from UK Polling Report.

=== 1979 ===
Survey end date	Pollster	Client	Lab	Con	Lib	Lead
3 May	1979 general election		36.9%	43.9%	13.8%	7%
2 May	Gallup	The Daily Telegraph	38.5%	49%	9%	10.5%
2 May	NOP	Daily Mail	39%	46%	12.5%	7%
2 May	Gallup	The Daily Telegraph	41%	43%	13.5%	2%
2 May	MORI	Evening Standard	37%	45%	15%	8%
1 May	MORI	Daily Express	38.8%	44.4%	13.5%	5.6%
1 May	Marplan	The Sun	38.5%	45%	9%	6.5%
30 Apr	NOP	Daily Mail	43.1%	42.4%	12.2%	0.7%
26 Apr	MORI	Daily Express	41%	44%	12%	3%
25 Apr	Gallup	The Sunday Telegraph	40%	48%	10.5%	8%
25 Apr	Research Srv	The Observer	38%	49.5%	10%	11.5%
25 Apr	Marplan	The Sun	40%	48%	10%	8%
23 Apr	MORI	Daily Express	40%	46%	11%	6%
21 Apr	Gallup	The Daily Telegraph	41.5%	46.5%	10%	5%
19 Apr	Marplan	The Sun	40%	50%	9%	10%
18 Apr	Gallup	The Sunday Telegraph	42%	47.5%	9%	5.5%
18 Apr	Marplan	The Sun	41%	51%	6%	10%
18 Apr	Research Srv	The Observer	34%	54%	9.5%	20%
17 Apr	MORI	Daily Express	38%	50%	10%	12%
14 Apr	NOP	Daily Mail	42%	48%	8%	6%
11 Apr	Research Srv	The Observer	37%	53%	8%	16%
9 Apr	Gallup	The Daily Telegraph	40%	50%	8%	10%
9 Apr	MORI	Daily Express	39%	49%	10%	10%
7 Apr	The Dissolution of the 47th Parliament and campaigning officially begins					
4 Apr	Research Srv	The Observer	33.5%	54.5%	9%	21%
3 Apr	NOP	Daily Mail	42%	48%	8%	6%
2 Apr	MORI	Daily Express	38%	51%	10%	13%
29 Mar	MORI	Thames	42%	51%	5%	9%
29 Mar	Liverpool Edge Hill by-election					
28 Mar	The vote of no confidence in the Callaghan ministry passes					
28 Mar	Gallup	The Daily Telegraph	40.5%	47.5%	9%	7%
12 Mar	Gallup	The Daily Telegraph	37%	51.5%	8.5%	14.5%
5 Mar	MORI	N/A	39%	52%	7%	13%
1 Mar	Knutsford and Clitheroe by-elections					
14 Feb	The Winter of Discontent ends following negotiations with the TUC					
12 Feb	Gallup	The Daily Telegraph	33%	53%	11%	20%
8 Feb	NOP	N/A	40.7%	49%	7.4%	8.3%
1 Feb	MORI	N/A	36%	55%	6%	19%
15 Jan	Gallup	The Daily Telegraph	41.5%	49%	6%	7.5%
4 Jan	NOP	N/A	49.1%	42.5%	5.7%	6.6%

=== 1978 ===
Survey end date	Pollster	Client	Lab	Con	Lib	Lead
14 Dec	The Callaghan ministry survives a vote of no confidence					
11 Dec	Gallup	The Daily Telegraph	42.5%	48%	6%	5.5%
7 Dec	NOP	N/A	47.9%	44.7%	4.6%	3.2%
13 Nov	Gallup	The Daily Telegraph	48%	43%	6.5%	5%
9 Nov	NOP	N/A	46.8%	44.8%	6.2%	2%
8 Nov	MORI	N/A	46%	47%	5%	1%
26 Oct	Pontefract and Castleford & Berwick and East Lothian by-elections					
23 Oct	Gallup	The Daily Telegraph	47.5%	42%	7.5%	5.5%
12 Oct	NOP	N/A	48.5%	44.2%	4.7%	4.3%
11 Sep	Gallup	The Daily Telegraph	42.5%	49.5%	6%	7%
11 Sep	MORI	N/A	42%	48%	8%	6%
7 Sep	The Lib-Lab pact ends					
5 Sep	NOP	N/A	45.8%	48%	4.8%	2.2%
4 Sep	MORI	N/A	45%	47%	5%	2%
14 Aug	Gallup	The Daily Telegraph	47.5%	43.5%	6%	4%
14 Aug	MORI	N/A	44%	47%	6%	3%
9 Aug	NOP	N/A	48.5%	42.4%	6.3%	6.1%
17 Jul	Gallup	The Daily Telegraph	43%	45%	8.5%	2%
13 Jul	Penistone & Manchester Moss Side by-elections					
11 Jul	MORI	N/A	41%	49%	6%	8%
5 Jul	NOP	N/A	44.4%	46.5%	6.3%	2.1%
30 Jun	MORI	N/A	42%	48%	6%	6%
14 Jun	NOP	N/A	42.3%	49.1%	6.3%	6.8%
13 Jun	MORI	N/A	45%	46%	6%	1%
12 Jun	Gallup	The Daily Telegraph	45.5%	45.5%	6%	Tie
31 May	Hamilton by-election					
24 May	MORI	N/A	46%	45%	6%	1%
15 May	Gallup	The Daily Telegraph	43.5%	43.5%	8.5%	Tie
9 May	NOP	N/A	48%	43.1%	7%	4.9%
2–4 May	1978 local elections					
27 Apr	Wycombe & Epsom and Ewell by-elections					
20 Apr	Lambeth Central by-election					
17 Apr	Gallup	The Daily Telegraph	43.5%	45.5%	7.5%	2%
13 Apr	MORI	N/A	44%	46%	7%	2%
13 Apr	Glasgow Garscadden by-election					
12 Apr	NOP	N/A	44.5%	46.2%	6.6%	1.7%
20 Mar	Gallup	The Daily Telegraph	41%	48%	8%	7%
8 Mar	NOP	N/A	45.6%	44.6%	7.3%	1%
2 Mar	Ilford North by election					
15 Feb	NOP	N/A	44.6%	45.3%	7.1%	0.7%
13 Feb	Gallup	The Daily Telegraph	39%	48%	9%	9%
18 Jan	NOP		45.5%	44%	7.5%	1.5%
16 Jan	Gallup	The Daily Telegraph	43.5%	43.5%	8.5%	Tie

=== 1977 ===
Survey end date	Pollster	Client	Lab	Con	Lib	Lead
14 Dec	NOP	N/A	48.8%	40.8%	7%	8%
12 Dec	Gallup	The Daily Telegraph	44.5%	44%	8%	0.5%
7 Dec	NOP	N/A	44.1%	44.6%	7.5%	0.5%
30 Nov	NOP	N/A	47.5%	43.2%	6.3%	4.3%
24 Nov	Bournemouth East by election					
23 Nov	NOP	N/A	44.3%	46.7%	6.2%	2.4%
16 Nov	NOP	N/A	48.5%	42.5%	6.2%	6%
14 Nov	Gallup	The Daily Telegraph	42%	45.5%	8.5%	3.5%
9 Nov	NOP	N/A	44.1%	45.5%	7%	1.4%
26 Oct	NOP	N/A	43%	46.7%	6.9%	3.7%
26 Oct	MORI	N/A	44%	45%	7%	1%
24 Oct	Gallup	The Daily Telegraph	45%	45%	8%	Tie
19 Oct	NOP	N/A	45.8%	44.1%	7.3%	1.7%
22 Sep	MORI	N/A	42%	49%	5%	7%
14 Sep	NOP	N/A	41.8%	48%	7.3%	6.2%
12 Sep	Gallup	The Daily Telegraph	41%	45.5%	8.5%	4.5%
18 Aug	Birmingham Ladywood by election					
15 Aug	Gallup	The Daily Telegraph	37.5%	48.5%	9%	11%
10 Aug	NOP	N/A	38.2%	51.3%	7.1%	13.1%
18 Jul	Gallup	The Daily Telegraph	34.5%	49%	10.5%	14.5%
13 Jul	NOP	N/A	35.1%	53.1%	8.4%	18%
7 Jul	Saffron Walden by election					
22 Jun	NOP	N/A	37.1%	49.1%	10.8%	12%
13 Jun	Gallup	The Daily Telegraph	37%	47.5%	10.5%	10.5%
16 May	Gallup	The Daily Telegraph	33%	53.5%	8.5%	20.5%
11 May	NOP	N/A	36.9%	52.9%	7.2%	16%
3–18 May	1977 local elections					
2 May	NOP	N/A	41%	48.3%	6.6%	7.3%
28 Apr	Grimsby & Ashfield by-elections					
20 Apr	NOP	N/A	38.3%	49.4%	9.1%	11.1%
18 Apr	Gallup	The Daily Telegraph	33.5%	49%	11.5%	15.5%
31 Mar	Birmingham Stechford by-election					
23 Mar	NOP	N/A	35.7%	50.9%	9.7%	15.2%
23 Mar	The Lib–Lab pact is formed					
14 Mar	Gallup	The Daily Telegraph	33%	49.5%	13%	16.5%
28 Feb	MORI	N/A	38%	47%	12%	9%
24 Feb	City of London and Westminster South by-election					
23 Feb	NOP	N/A	37.4%	47.3%	10.9%	9.9%
16 Feb	NOP	N/A	36.1%	50.2%	10%	14.1%
14 Feb	Gallup	The Daily Telegraph	33.5%	46%	14%	12.5%
26 Jan	NOP	N/A	36.8%	48.4%	10.2%	11.6%
17 Jan	Gallup	The Daily Telegraph	34%	47%	14.5%	13%
2 Jan	NOP	N/A	35.1%	50%	11.2%	14.9%

=== 1976 ===
Survey end date	Pollster	Client	Lab	Con	Lib	Lead
14 Dec	NOP	N/A	38.4%	47.9%	10.6%	9.5%
2 Dec	Cambridge by-election					
13 Dec	Gallup	The Daily Telegraph	34%	49.5%	11.5%	15.5%
28 Nov	NOP	N/A	31.3%	55.2%	9.4%	23.9%
15 Nov	Gallup	The Daily Telegraph	30%	55%	11.5%	25%
7 Nov	NOP	N/A	38.2%	49.3%	9.3%	11.1%
4 Nov	Workington, Walsall North and Newcastle-upon-Tyne Central by-elections					
18 Oct	Gallup	The Daily Telegraph	36.5%	48%	11.5%	11.5%
17 Oct	NOP	N/A	34.9%	53.4%	8.3%	18.5%
10 Oct	NOP	N/A	35.9%	50.7%	9.5%	14.8%
26 Sep	NOP	N/A	39.6%	45.6%	9.9%	6%
20 Sep	Gallup	The Daily Telegraph	42%	42.5%	11%	0.5%
12 Sep	NOP	N/A	40.5%	46.5%	9.1%	6%
22 Aug	NOP	N/A	43.3%	43.9%	9.3%	0.6%
16 Aug	Gallup	The Daily Telegraph	41%	44%	10%	3%
18 Jul	NOP	N/A	43.5%	43.6%	8.7%	0.1%
15 Jul	Thurrock by-election					
12 Jul	Gallup	The Daily Telegraph	41%	41%	13%	Tie
11 Jul	NOP	N/A	44.1%	42.1%	9.5%	2%
7 Jul	David Steel is elected leader of the Liberal Party					
24 Jun	Rotherham by-election					
14 Jun	Gallup	The Daily Telegraph	40.5%	44%	11%	3.5%
10 Jun	NOP	N/A	41.2%	45.8%	8.8%	4.6%
23 May	NOP	N/A	43%	44.7%	8.3%	1.7%
17 May	Gallup	The Daily Telegraph	41%	44%	10.5%	3%
16 May	NOP	N/A	41.5%	46.5%	8.3%	5%
6 May	1976 local elections					
28 Apr	NOP	N/A	46.1%	41.7%	8.4%	4.4%
12 Apr	Gallup	The Daily Telegraph	46.5%	41%	9%	5.5%
11 Apr	NOP	N/A	44.7%	43.6%	9%	1.1%
9 Apr	MORI	N/A	46%	40%	10%	6%
5 Apr	James Callaghan is elected leader of the Labour Party and becomes Prime Minister					
19 Mar	MORI	N/A	47%	40%	9%	7%
15 Mar	Gallup	The Daily Telegraph	41.5%	44%	9.5%	2.5%
14 Mar	NOP	N/A	41.7%	46%	8.8%	4.3%
11 Mar	Wirral & Carshalton by-elections					
4 Mar	Coventry North West by-election					
16 Feb	Gallup	The Daily Telegraph	40.5%	45.5%	10.5%	5%
25 Jan	NOP	N/A	42.8%	42%	11.3%	0.8%
22 Jan	NOP	N/A	40.5%	43.9%	11.4%	3.4%
19 Jan	Gallup	The Daily Telegraph	42%	40.5%	14%	1.5%

=== 1975 ===
Survey end date	Pollster	Client	Lab	Con	Lib	Lead
16 Dec	NOP	N/A	38.3%	45.4%	11.7%	7.1%
16 Dec	Gallup	The Daily Telegraph	41%	40.5%	14%	0.5%
30 Nov	NOP	N/A	37.4%	44.5%	14.9%	7.1%
17 Nov	Gallup	The Daily Telegraph	44.5%	39%	12.5%	5.5%
16 Nov	NOP	N/A	41.2%	43.6%	12.7%	2.4%
30 Oct	NOP	N/A	41.5%	43.4%	11.8%	1.9%
20 Oct	Gallup	The Daily Telegraph	40.5%	42.5%	13.5%	2%
22 Sep	Gallup	The Daily Telegraph	41.5%	38.5%	16.5%	3%
7 Sep	NOP	N/A	40.8%	45.7%	10.3%	4.9%
18 Aug	Gallup	The Daily Telegraph	42%	40.5%	14%	1.5%
17 Aug	NOP	N/A	40.3%	44.4%	11.6%	4.1%
14 Jul	Gallup	The Daily Telegraph	40.5%	43%	12.5%	2.5%
29 Jun	NOP	N/A	37.2%	48.8%	10.4%	11.6%
26 Jun	Woolwich West by-election					
16 Jun	Gallup	The Daily Telegraph	40.5%	44%	13%	3.5%
5 Jun	The United Kingdom votes "Yes" to staying in the European Community					
1 Jun	NOP	N/A	43.6%	42%	10.7%	1.6%
19 May	Gallup	The Daily Telegraph	39.5%	45.5%	11%	6%
11 May	NOP	N/A	40.2%	42.9%	13%	2.7%
1 May	1975 local elections					
27 Apr	NOP	N/A	43.5%	42.4%	10.9%	1.1%
14 Apr	Gallup	The Daily Telegraph	45%	43%	10%	2%
6 Apr	NOP	N/A	43.3%	44.8%	9.1%	1.5%
17 Mar	Gallup	The Daily Telegraph	44%	42%	11%	2%
2 Mar	NOP	N/A	46.4%	40.8%	10.3%	5.6%
17 Feb	Gallup	The Daily Telegraph	41%	45%	11%	4%
11 Feb	Margaret Thatcher is elected leader of the Conservative Party					
9 Feb	NOP	N/A	46%	38.6%	11.1%	7.4%
2 Feb	NOP	N/A	43.8%	38.1%	14.6%	5.7%
19 Jan	NOP	N/A	47.8%	32.4%	15.9%	15.4%
13 Jan	Gallup	The Daily Telegraph	48.5%	34%	13%	14.5%

=== 1974 ===
Survey end date	Pollster	Client	Lab	Con	Lib	Lead
16 Dec	Gallup	The Daily Telegraph	47%	33%	16.5%	14%
1 Dec	NOP	N/A	47.7%	38.4%	11.1%	9.3%
18 Nov	Gallup	The Daily Telegraph	46.5%	35%	14.5%	11.5%
27 Oct	NOP	N/A	43.7%	36.6%	15.1%	7.1%
10 Oct	Oct 1974 general election		39.2%	35.8%	18.3%	3.4%

== Polling in the nations and regions ==
=== Scotland ===
Date(s) conducted	Pollster	Client	Sample size	Lab	SNP	Con	Lib	SLP	Lead
3 May 1979	1979 election		–	41.5%	17.3%	31.4%	9.0%	0.5%	10.1%
3 May 1979 (Note: Date the poll was published.)		Scottish Daily Express		44%	18%	30%	6%		14%
30 Apr 1979	Opinion Research Centre	The Scotsman		42%	15%	34%	8%		8%
25 Apr 1979	Opinion Research Centre	The Scotsman		42%	16%	33%	9%		9%
10–12 Apr 1979	System Three	Glasgow Herald	1,079	49%	17%	27%	6%	1%	22%
26 Mar – 2 Apr 1979	System Three	Glasgow Herald	1,003	45%	19%	29%	6%	2%	16%
7 Apr 1979	Dissolution of the 47th Parliament and campaigning officially begins								
1 Mar 1979	1979 Scottish devolution referendum								
24–25 Feb 1979	System Three	Glasgow Herald	1,080	40%	18%	37%	4%	1%	3%
20–22 Feb 1979	MORI	Scottish Daily Express	1,037	44%	21%	32%	2%		12%
12–14 Feb 1979	MORI	LWT Weekend World	1,015	45%	23%	30%	2%		15%
29 Jan – 6 Feb 1979	System Three	Glasgow Herald	1,003	40%	23%	31%	4%	1%	9%
8–20 Jan 1979	System Three	Glasgow Herald	926	45%	20%	31%	2%	2%	14%
Dec 1978	System Three	Glasgow Herald		48%	21%	25%	4%	2%	23%
Nov 1978	System Three	Glasgow Herald		51%	21%	23%	3%	2%	28%
26 Oct 1978	1978 Berwick and East Lothian by-election								
26 Sep – 3 Oct 1978	System Three	Glasgow Herald	972	48%	19%	27%	4%	1%	21%
30 Aug – 8 Sep 1978	System Three	Glasgow Herald	1,000	52%	18%	24%	3%	3%	28%
31 Jul – 9 Aug 1978	System Three	Glasgow Herald	962	48%	18%	30%	4%	0.5%	18%
26 Jun – 5 Jul 1978	System Three	Glasgow Herald	906	47%	22%	26%	4%	1%	21%
31 May 1978	1978 Hamilton by-election								
2 May 1978	1978 Scottish regional elections								
25 Apr – 2 May 1978	System Three	Glasgow Herald	1,024	47%	24%	24%	3%	2%	23%
13 Apr 1978	1978 Glasgow Garscadden by-election								
27 Mar – 5 Apr 1978	System Three	Glasgow Herald	1,008	38%	27%	29%	4%	2%	9%
5 Apr 1978	MORI	LWT Weekend World	1,002	41%	27%	30%	3%	1%	11%
6–14 Mar 1978	System Three	Glasgow Herald	1,031	35%	27%	30%	5%	2%	5%
30 Jan – 6 Feb 1978	System Three	Glasgow Herald	994	38%	27%	28%	5%	2%	10%
Jan 1978	System Three	Glasgow Herald		34%	29%	28%	6%	3%	5%
Nov 1977	System Three	Glasgow Herald		35%	30%	27%	5%	3%	5%
24 Oct – 8 Nov 1977	System Three	Glasgow Herald	984	36%	26%	30%	6%	2%	6%
26 Sep – 6 Oct 1977	System Three	Glasgow Herald	971	31%	28%	32%	6%	2%	1%
22 Aug – 2 Sep 1977	System Three	Glasgow Herald	1,045	29%	30%	32%	5%	4%	2%
25 Jul – 8 Aug 1977	System Three	Glasgow Herald	947	32%	33%	26%	5%	3%	1%
Jun 1977	System Three	Glasgow Herald		28%	32%	31%	6%	2%	1%
30 May – 7 Jun 1977	System Three	Glasgow Herald	1,019	33%	35%	26%	4%	1%	2%
3 May 1977	1977 Scottish local elections								
25 Apr – 4 May 1977	System Three	Glasgow Herald	1,012	28%	31%	31%	6%	2%	Tied
Mar 1977	System Three	Glasgow Herald		27%	36%	27%	5%	3%	9%
26 Feb – 5 Mar 1977	System Three	Glasgow Herald	978	29%	31%	32%	5%	3%	1%
Jan 1977	System Three	Glasgow Herald		28%	33%	29%	6%	4%	4%
27 Sep – 7 Oct 1976	System Three	Glasgow Herald	948	30%	28%	30%	9%	1%	Tied
23–30 Aug 1976	System Three	Glasgow Herald	1,009	30%	30%	31%	4%	4%	1%
28 Jun – 7 Jul 1976	System Three	Glasgow Herald	943	34%	27%	32%	4%	3%	2%
24 May – 4 Jun 1976	System Three	Glasgow Herald	855	35%	25%	32%	4%	3%	3%
24 Feb – 4 Mar 1976	System Three	Glasgow Herald	929	24%	33%	28%	6%	8%	5%
7–14 Jan 1976	System Three	Glasgow Herald	980	30%	36%	28%	5%		6%
Nov 1975	System Three	Glasgow Herald		42%	26%	26%	5%		16%
5 Jun 1975	1975 United Kingdom European Communities membership referendum								
26–30 May 1975	System Three	Glasgow Herald	1,016	40%	26%	28%	5%		12%
28 Apr – 2 May 1975	System Three	Glasgow Herald	1,022	37%	27%	31%	5%		6%
26 Mar – 4 Apr 1975	System Three	Glasgow Herald	890	40%	24%	29%	6%		11%
25 Feb – 5 Mar 1975	System Three	Glasgow Herald	883	40%	29%	28%	3%		11%
28 Jan – 5 Feb 1975	System Three	Glasgow Herald	982	40%	29%	24%	6%		11%
10 Oct 1974	October 1974 election		–	36.3%	30.4%	24.7%	8.3%	N/A	5.9%
