= 1979 United Kingdom general election =

- 3 May 1979

All 635 seats in the House of Commons 318 seats needed for a majority
- Opinion polls
- Registered: 41,095,649
- Turnout: 31,221,362; 76.0% (▲3.2 pp)

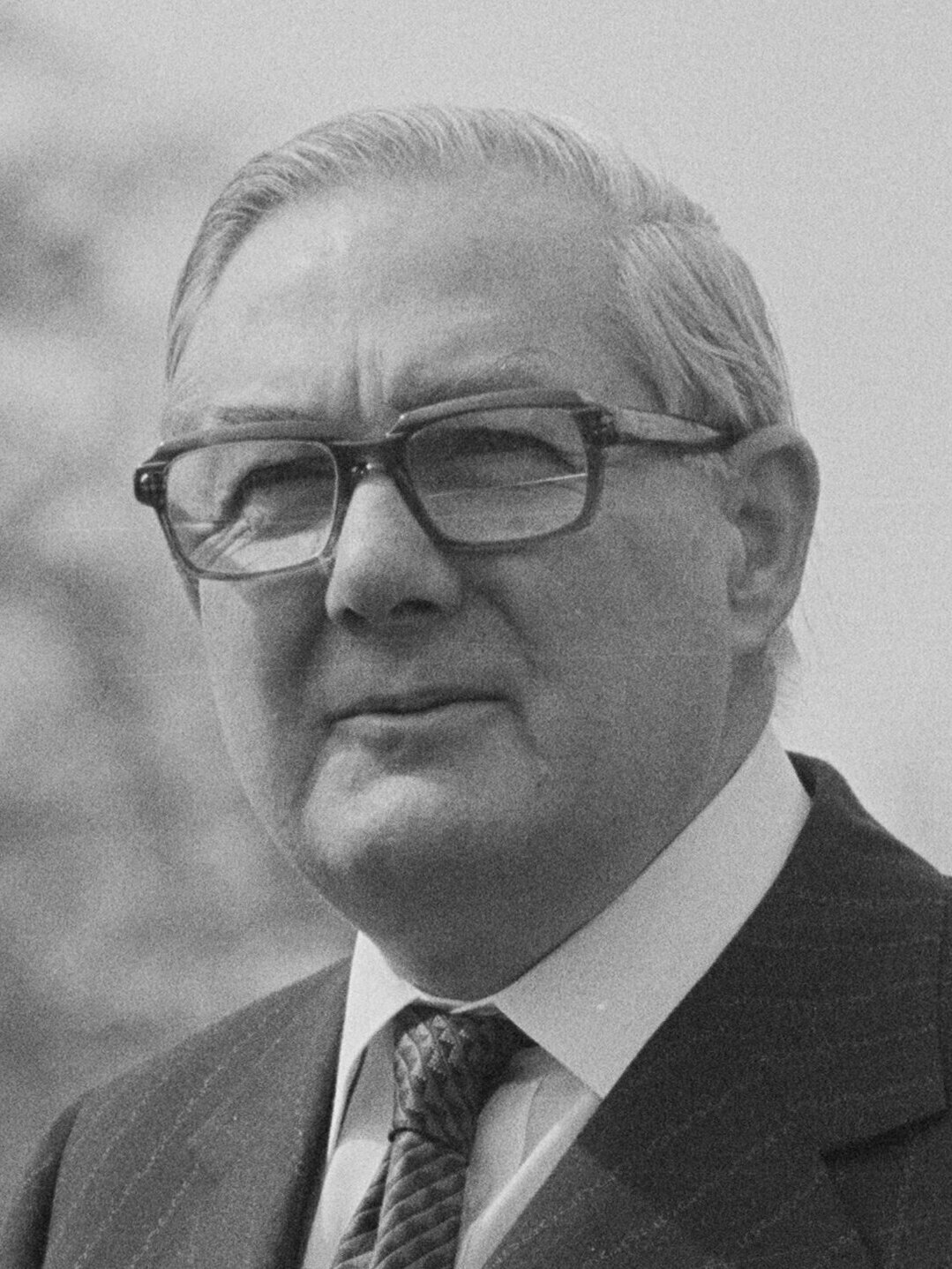

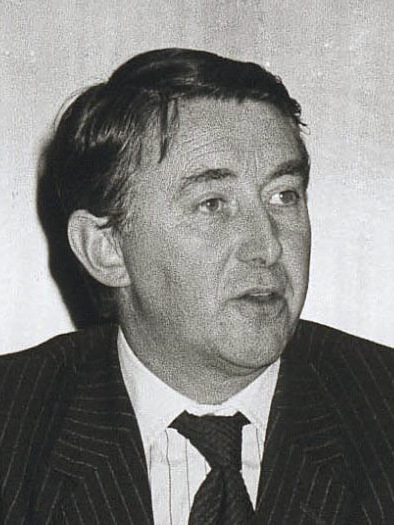
	First party	Second party	Third party
Leader	Margaret Thatcher	James Callaghan	David Steel
Party	Conservative	Labour	Liberal
Leader since	11 February 1975	5 April 1976	7 July 1976
Leader's seat	Finchley	Cardiff South East	Roxburgh, Selkirk and Peebles
Last election	277 seats, 35.8%	319 seats, 39.2%	13 seats, 18.3%
Seats before	284	309	14
Seats won	339	269 (Note: Figure includes Speaker of the House of Commons George Thomas in Cardiff West.)	11
Seat change	▲62	▼50	▼2
Popular vote	13,697,923	11,532,218	4,313,804
Percentage	43.9%	36.9%	13.8%
Swing	▲8.1 pp	▼2.3 pp	▼4.5 pp
- Colours denote the winning party—as shown in § Results

- Composition of the House of Commons after the election
Prime Minister before election
James Callaghan
Labour
Prime Minister after election
Margaret Thatcher
Conservative

A general election was held in the United Kingdom on Thursday 3 May 1979 to elect 635 members to the House of Commons (MPs). The election was held following the defeat of the Labour government in a no-confidence motion on 28 March 1979, six months before the Parliament was due for dissolution in October 1979. The Conservative Party, led by Margaret Thatcher, ousted the incumbent Labour government of Prime Minister James Callaghan, gaining a parliamentary majority of 43 seats. Thatcher thus became the United Kingdom's and Europe's first elected female head of government. 1979 was the first of four consecutive election victories for the Conservative Party, beginning 18 years in government for the Conservatives and 18 years in opposition for Labour. Unusually, the date chosen coincided with the 1979 local elections, where Labour recovered some lost councils. The parish council elections were pushed back a few weeks.

The previous parliamentary term had begun in October 1974, when Harold Wilson led Labour to a majority of three seats. However, after just two years, he had resigned as prime minister, being succeeded by James Callaghan; and within a further year the government's narrow majority had gone. To remain in power, Callaghan made agreements with the Liberals and later the Ulster Unionists, as well as the Scottish and Welsh nationalists. The Lib–Lab pact fell apart in July 1978, but Callaghan refused to call an autumn election as private polling indicated Labour would not be likley to win a majority in the event. On 28 March 1979, following the defeat of the Scottish devolution referendum, Thatcher tabled a motion of no confidence, which was passed by one vote (311 to 310). This was the first successful vote of no-confidence since 1924, and triggered a premature general election.

Labour's campaign was hampered by recent memories of a series of industrial disputes and strikes during the winter of 1978–79, known as the Winter of Discontent, and the party focused on support for the National Health Service. The Conservatives pledged to control double-digit inflation and curb the power of trade unions. Both parties ran on lowering unemployment that had reached a 40-year high in 1978, with a memorable Conservative advertisement produced by Saatchi & Saatchi declaring "Labour Isn't Working". The Liberal Party was damaged by allegations that Jeremy Thorpe, its former leader, had been involved in a homosexual affair and had conspired to murder his former lover. The Liberals were now being led by David Steel, meaning that all three major parties entered the election with a new leader.

The election saw a 5.2% swing from Labour to the Conservatives, the largest percentage swing since the 1945 election, when Labour's Clement Attlee defeated Winston Churchill. Margaret Thatcher became prime minister, while Callaghan resigned as party leader and was replaced by Michael Foot in 1980. BBC election night coverage was presented by David Dimbleby and Robin Day, with Robert McKenzie on the "Swingometer", and featured further analysis by David Butler. It was the election night to feature Rick Wakeman's song "Arthur" during the BBC's coverage. On ITV, the election broadcast was hosted by Alastair Burnet, Martyn Lewis, Peter Snow and Leonard Parkin. Because of the economic and social backdrop in this election, commentators have drawn parallels to the 1980 United States presidential election in which incumbent US president Jimmy Carter was defeated by Ronald Reagan, an advocate of similar socioeconomic policies to those of Thatcher.

John Major, who would succeed Thatcher as prime minister in November 1990, first entered Parliament at this election, representing Huntingdonshire in Cambridgeshire. Former Cabinet ministers Shirley Williams and Barbara Castle, as well as Thorpe, were among the MPs who retired or lost their seats.

As of 2026, this is the earliest British election from which a major party leader (Steel) is still alive.

== Timeline ==
After suffering a vote of no confidence on 28 March 1979, Prime Minister James Callaghan was forced to announce that he would request a dissolution of Parliament to bring about a general election. The key dates were as follows:

Saturday 7 April	Dissolution of the 47th Parliament and campaigning officially begins; 2,576 candidates enter to contest 635 seats
Wednesday 2 May	Campaigning officially ends
Thursday 3 May	Polling day
Friday 4 May	The Conservative Party wins power with a majority of 43
Wednesday 9 May	The 48th Parliament assembles
Tuesday 15 May	State Opening of Parliament

== Background ==
Callaghan succeeded Harold Wilson as the Labour prime minister after the latter's surprise resignation in April 1976. By March 1977, Labour had become a minority government after two by-election defeats cost them the three-seat majority they had won in October 1974, and from March 1977 to August 1978 Callaghan governed by an agreement with the Liberal Party through the Lib–Lab pact. Callaghan had considered calling an election in the autumn of 1978, but ultimately decided that imminent tax cuts, and a possible economic upturn in 1979, could favour his party at the polls and delayed the election until the following year. Although published opinion polls suggested that he might win, private polls commissioned by the Labour Party from MORI had suggested the two main parties had much the same level of support.

However, events would soon overtake the Labour government and prove Callaghan's decision to delay an election to be a costly mistake. A series of industrial disputes in the winter of 1978–79, dubbed the "Winter of Discontent", led to widespread strikes across the country and seriously hurt Labour's standings in the polls while boosting support for the Conservative opposition. When the Scottish National Party (SNP) withdrew support for the Scotland Act 1978, a vote of no confidence was held and passed by one vote on 28 March 1979, forcing Callaghan to call a general election. As the previous election had been held in October 1974, Labour could have held on until the autumn of 1979 if it had not been for the lost confidence vote.

Margaret Thatcher had won her party's 1975 leadership election over former leader Edward Heath, taking over the leadership of the party in February 1975, four months after the party's failure to win the October 1974 election. Heath had led the party for a decade but lost three of the four elections he contested.

David Steel had replaced Jeremy Thorpe as leader of the Liberal Party in 1976, after allegations of homosexuality and conspiracy to murder his former lover forced Thorpe to resign. The Thorpe affair led to a fall in the Liberal vote, after what had been thought to be a breakthrough in the February 1974 election.

=== Campaign ===
This was the first election since 1959 to feature three new leaders for the main political parties. The three main parties all advocated cutting income tax. Labour and the Conservatives did not specify the exact thresholds of income tax they would implement but the Liberals did, claiming they would have income tax starting at 20% with a top rate of 50%.

Without explicitly mentioning Thatcher's sex, Callaghan was (as Christian Caryl later wrote) "a master at sardonically implying that whatever the leader of the opposition said was made even sillier by the fact that it was said by a woman". Thatcher used the tactics that had defeated her other male opponents: constantly studying, sleeping only a few hours a night, and exploiting her femininity to appear as someone who understood housewives' household budgets.

A proposal for the two main party leaders to participate in two televised debates was put forward by former Labour MP turned broadcaster Brian Walden. These would have been produced by LWT and were planned to be shown on ITV on 22 & 29 April 1979. While James Callaghan immediately accepted Walden's proposal, Margaret Thatcher decided to "wait a few days before replying" to the invitation. According to The Glasgow Herald, Some of Mrs Thatcher's advisers were concerned that she had more to lose from such debates, fearing that it would lead to a "presidential-style 'Her or me' campaign" which would see policy issues become of less importance. However it was also reported that the danger of declining was that Mrs Thatcher would be charged by Labour as being "scared" to face the Prime Minister. At the insistence of the Liberals, their leader David Steel was also invited by LWT to take part, and accepted the offer. However, Mrs Thatcher declined the offer to take part, saying that the election was for a government, not a president, which meant that the debates did not go ahead.

==== Labour ====
===== Campaign themes =====
The Labour campaign reiterated their support for the National Health Service and full employment and focused on the damage they believed the Conservatives would do to the country. In an early campaign broadcast, Callaghan asked: "The question you will have to consider is whether we risk tearing everything up by the roots." Towards the end of Labour's campaign, Callaghan claimed a Conservative government "would sit back and just allow firms to go bankrupt and jobs to be lost in the middle of a world recession" and that the Conservatives were "too big a gamble to take".

Throughout the campaign, Labour placed particular emphasis on unemployment, presenting it as the central dividing line between the parties. Callaghan argued that government intervention and industrial assistance had protected or created up to 1.2 million jobs and warned that Conservative plans to reduce state support for industry would put those jobs at risk. Following the publication of improved employment figures in mid-April, Callaghan claimed that falling unemployment was evidence that Labour's economic strategy was working and contrasted Britain's performance with rising joblessness in parts of Europe.

As opinion polls continued to show a Conservative lead, Labour intensified its warnings that Conservative tax cuts would lead to higher prices and renewed industrial conflict. Callaghan described the prospect of a Conservative government abandoning pay restraint as a “national catastrophe” that could result in wage settlements escalating to 20 or 25 per cent, undermining living standards. Labour also argued that Conservative policies would weaken regional development agencies and end support for struggling industries, turning parts of Britain into “deserts of unemployment”.

===== Trade union involvement =====
Trade unions played an unusually prominent role in the campaign. The Trade Union Committee for a Labour Victory coordinated activity in marginal constituencies, while major unions contributed substantial funds to Labour’s election effort and distributed special publications urging members to vote Labour.

===== Manifesto =====
The Labour Party manifesto, The Labour way is the better way, was issued on 6 April. Callaghan presented five priorities:

1. "We must keep a curb on inflation and prices";
2. "We will carry forward the task of putting into practice the new framework to improve industrial relations that we have hammered out with the TUC";
3. "We give a high priority to working for a return to full employment";
4. "We are deeply concerned to enlarge people's freedom"; and
5. "We will use Britain's influence to strengthen world peace and defeat world poverty"

==== Conservatives ====
The Conservatives campaigned on economic issues, pledging to control inflation and to reduce the increasing power of the trade unions who supported mass strikes. They also employed the advertising agency Saatchi & Saatchi who had created the "Labour Isn't Working" poster.

The Conservative campaign was focused on gaining support from traditional Labour voters who had never voted Conservative before, first-time voters, and people who had voted Liberal in 1974. Thatcher's advisers, Gordon Reece and Timothy Bell, co-ordinated their presentation with the editor of The Sun, Larry Lamb. The Sun printed a series of articles by disillusioned former Labour ministers (Reg Prentice, Richard Marsh, George Brown, Alfred Robens and Lord Chalfont) detailing why they had switched their support to Thatcher. She explicitly asked Labour voters for their support when she launched her campaign in Cardiff, claiming that Labour was now extreme. Choosing to start her campaign in the strongly Labour-supporting city was part of Thatcher's strategy of appealing to skilled manual workers (NRS social group C2), whom both parties had previously seen as certain Labour voters; she thought that many of these would support her promises to reduce unions' power and enact the Right to Buy their homes. On 29 April the Conservatives held a massive rally in London for Conservative trade unionists. The Glasgow Herald called it an "astonishing rally" which it likened to "the razza-matazz of an American presidential-style jamboree" and stated "Nothing quite like it has been seen before in a General Election in Britain." Several celebrities including Lulu, Molly Weir and Nigel Davenport appeared to support Thatcher and the Conservatives, while others like Eric Sykes and Les Dawson sent messages of support. It was also announced former Labour MP Eddie Griffiths was backing the Conservatives against his former party.

An analysis of the election result showed that the Conservatives gained an 11% swing among the skilled working class (the C2s) and a 9% swing amongst the unskilled working class (the DEs).

Thatcher's stance on immigration in the late 1970s (following the vast immigration from Asian and African-Caribbean nations during the 1950s and 1960s) was perceived as part of a rising racist public discourse, As Leader of the Opposition, Thatcher believed that the National Front (NF) was winning over large numbers of Conservative voters with warnings against floods of immigrants. Her strategy was to undermine the NF narrative by acknowledging that many of its voters had serious concerns in need of addressing. The National Front had a relatively small following and did not win any seats in parliament.

Thatcher criticised Labour immigration policy in January 1978, with the goal of attracting voters away from the NF and to the Conservatives. Her rhetoric was followed by an increase in Conservative support at the expense of the NF. Critics on the left reacted by accusing her of pandering to racism. Sociologists Mark Mitchell and Dave Russell responded that Thatcher had been badly misinterpreted, arguing that race was never an important focus of Thatcherism. Throughout her premiership both major parties took similar positions on immigration policy, having in 1981 passed the British Nationality Act with bipartisan support. No policies aimed at restricting immigration were passed or proposed by her government, and the subject of race was never highlighted by Thatcher in any of her major speeches as prime minister. Although Thatcher had pledged to address concerns felt by NF voters including matters related to immigration and presided over a period of disaffected race relations early in her premiership, the Conservative Party under her leadership actively began reaching out to ethnic minority voters ahead of the 1983 general election.

The Conservative manifesto, drafted by Chris Patten and Adam Ridley and edited by Angus Maude, reflected Thatcher's views and was issued on 11 April. It promised five major policies:

1. "to restore the health of our economic and social life, by controlling inflation and striking a fair balance between the rights and duties of the trade union movement";
2. "to restore incentives so that hard work pays, success is rewarded and genuine new jobs are created in an expanding economy";
3. "to uphold Parliament and the rule of law";
4. "to support family life, by helping people to become home-owners, raising the standards of their children's education and concentrating welfare services on the effective support of the old, the sick, the disabled and those who are in real need"; and
5. "to strengthen Britain's defences and work with our allies to protect our interests in an increasingly threatening world".

== Opinion polling ==
Conservatives Labour Liberals

== Results ==
In the end, the overall swing of 5.2% was the largest since 1945, and gave the Conservatives a workable majority of 43 for the country's first female prime minister. The Conservative victory in 1979 also marked a change in government which would continue for 18 years, including the entire 1980s, until the Labour victory of 1997. It marked a period of political stability in the United Kingdom following four changes of government in the space of 15 years. Although the Conservatives would go on to win more seats under Thatcher in 1983 and 1987, and again under Boris Johnson in 2019, the Tories have never since matched the 43.9% of the popular vote they won in 1979. This also remains the most recent election in which the Tories won an overall majority from opposition.

The SNP saw a massive collapse in support, losing 9 of its 11 MPs. The Liberal Party had a disappointing election; its scandal-hit former leader Jeremy Thorpe lost his seat in North Devon to the Conservatives.

The National Front (NF) would record their highest ever vote in a general election with 0.6% of the popular vote. They would decline after. This was also the highest vote for a British Far-right party until 2010 when the British National Party received a higher popular vote and then Reform UK in 2024.

=== Summary of seats returned ===
Party	Leader	MPs		Aggregate votes	
Party	Leader		Of total		Of total
Conservative and Unionist Party	Margaret Thatcher	339	53.4%	13,697,923	43.9%
Labour Party	James Callaghan	269 (Note: Includes 17 Co-operative Party MP, as part of the Labour-Co-op alliance.)	42.4%	11,532,218	36.9%
Liberal Party	David Steel	11	1.7%	4,313,804	13.8%
Ulster Unionist Party	Harry West	5	0.8%	254,578	0.8%
Democratic Unionist Party	Ian Paisley	3	0.5%	70,975	0.2%
Scottish National Party	William Wolfe	2	0.3%	504,259	1.6%
Plaid Cymru	Gwynfor Evans	2	0.3%	132,544	0.4%
Social Democratic and Labour Party	Gerry Fitt	1	0.2%	126,325	0.4%
United Ulster Unionist Party	Ernest Baird	1	0.2%	39,856	0.1%
Independent Unionist	—N/a	1	0.2%	36,989	0.1%
Independent Republican	—N/a	1	0.2%	22,398	0.1%

=== Full results ===

Results of the May 1979 general election to the House of Commons of the United Kingdom
Party	Leader	Candidates	MPs					Aggregate votes		
Party	Leader	Candidates	Total	Gains	Losses	Net	Of total (%)	Total	Of total (%)	Change (%)
Conservative	Margaret; Thatcher	622	339	63	1 (Note: Teddy Taylor in Glasgow Cathcart.)	▲62	53.4	13,697,923	43.9	▲8.1
Labour	James; Callaghan	623 (Note: Includes 25 Co-operative Party candidates, as part of the Labour-Co-op alliance.)	269 (Note: Includes 17 Co-operative Party MPs, as part of the Labour-Co-op alliance.)	4	54	▼50 (Note: Includes ▲3 Co-operative Party MPs, as part of the Labour-Co-op alliance.)	42.4 (Note: Includes 2.7% for the Co-operative Party, as part of the Labour-Co-op alliance.)	11,457,079 (Note: Includes 485,115 for the Co-operative Party, as part of the Labour-Co-op alliance.)	36.9 (Note: Includes 1.6% for the Co-operative Party, as part of the Labour-Co-op alliance.)	▼2.3 (Note: Includes 0.0% for the Co-operative Party, as part of the Labour-Co-op alliance.)
Liberal	David; Steel	577	11	1 (Note: David Alton in Liverpool Edge Hill.)	3	▼2	2.1	4,313,804	13.8	▼4.5
SNP	William; Wolfe	71	2	0	9	▼9	0.3	504,259	1.6	▼1.3
UUP	Harry; West	11	5	1 (Note: Robert Bradford in Belfast South.)	2	▼1	0.8	254,578	0.8	▼0.1
National; Front	John; Tyndall	303	0	0	0	Steady	—	191,719	0.6	▲0.2
Plaid Cymru	Gwynfor; Evans	36	2	0	1 (Note: Leader Gwynfor Evans in Carmarthen.)	▼1	0.3	132,544	0.4	▼0.2
SDLP	Gerry; Fitt	9	1 (Note: Gerry Fitt in Belfast West.)	0	0	Steady	0.2	126,325	0.4	▼0.1
Alliance	Oliver; Napier	12	0	0	0	Steady	—	82,892	0.3	▲0.1
DUP	Ian; Paisley	5	3	2	0	▲2	0.5	70,975	0.2	Steady
Ecology	Jonathan; Tyler	53	0	0	0	Steady	—	39,918	0.1	▲0.1
UUUP	Ernest; Baird	2	1 (Note: John Dunlop in Mid Ulster.)	New		▲1	0.2	39,856	0.1	New
Independent; Unionist	—N/a	1	1 (Note: James Kilfedder in North Down.)	1	0	▲1	0.2	36,989	0.1	▲0.1
Independent; Labour	—N/a	7	0	0	0	Steady	—	23,884	0.1	Steady
Irish Independence	Pat; Fahy	4	0	New			—	23,086	0.1	New
Independent; Republican	—N/a	1	1 (Note: Frank Maguire in Fermanagh and South Tyrone.)	0	0	Steady	0.2	22,398	0.1	Steady
Communist	Gordon; McLennan	38	0	0	0	Steady	—	16,858	0.1	Steady
Scottish; Labour	Jim; Sillars	3	0	New			—	13,737	0.0	New
Workers; Revolutionary	Michael; Banda	60	0	0	0	Steady	—	12,631	0.0	Steady
Republican; Clubs	Tomás; Mac Giolla	7	0	0	0	Steady	—	12,098	0.0	▼0.1
Independent	—N/a	33	0	0	0	Steady	—	11,627	0.0	Steady
Independent; SDLP	—N/a	1 (Note: Candidate Austin Currie stood in Fermanagh and South Tyrone.)	0	New			—	10,795	0.0	New
Unionist Party NI	Anne; Dickson	3	0	0	0	Steady	—	8,021	0.0	▼0.1
Independent; Conservative	—N/a	8	0	0	0	Steady	—	5,621	0.0	Steady
NI; Labour	Alan; Carr	3	0	0	0	Steady	—	4,411	0.0	Steady
Mebyon; Kernow	Richard; Jenkin	3	0	0	0	Steady	—	4,164	0.0	Steady
Democratic; Labour	Dick; Taverne	2	0	0	0	Steady	—	3,785	0.0	▼0.1
Wessex; Regionalists	Alexander; Thynn	7	0	Did not stand in Oct. 1974			—	3,090	0.0	—N/a
Socialist; Unity	—N/a	11	0	New			—	2,966	0.0	New
United; Labour	Paddy; Devlin	1 (Note: Candidate Bob Kidd stood in South Antrim.)	0	New			—	1,895	0.0	New
Ratepayer (Leek)	—N/a	1 (Note: Candidate CI Bailey stood in Leek.)	0	New			—	1,451	0.0	New
United; Country	Edmund; Iremonger	2	0	New			—	1,033	0.0	New
Anti-Common; Market	—N/a	3	0	Did not stand in Oct. 1974			—	926	0.0	—N/a
Independent; Liberal	—N/a	1 (Note: Candidate H. I. Fjortoft stood in Bootle.)	0	0	0	Steady	—	911	0.0	Steady
Oxford; Ecological	—N/a	1 (Note: Candidate Anthony Cheke stood in Oxford.)	0	New			—	887	0.0	New
Workers (Leninist)	Royston; Bull	2	0	New			—	824	0.0	New
New Britain	Dennis; Delderfield	3	0	New			—	843	0.0	New
Silly; Party	—N/a	1 (Note: Candidate Jeremy Fox stood in Dover and Deal.)	0	New			—	642	0.0	New
Troops Out of Ireland	—N/a	1 (Note: Candidate B. Gallagher stood in Barnsley.)	0	New			—	638	0.0	New
Christian; Stop Abortion	—N/a	1 (Note: Candidate F. C. J. Radcliffe stood in York.)	0	New			—	569	0.0	New
Labour; Alliance	—N/a	1 (Note: Candidate Douglas Elliot stood in Vauxhall.)	0	New			—	565	0.0	New
Fellowship	Ronald; Mallone	2	0	Did not stand in Oct. 1974			—	531	0.0	—N/a
More Prosperous Britain	Tom; Keen	6	0	0	0	Steady	—	518	0.0	Steady
Independent; Democrat	—N/a	3	0	New			—	479	0.0	New
Severnside; Libertarian	—N/a	1 (Note: Candidate Raymond William Aldridge stood in Cardiff South East.)	0	New			—	375	0.0	New
Fancy Dress	John; Crockford	1 (Note: Candidate John Beddowes stood in Dartford.)	0	New			—	328	0.0	New
Christian; Democrat	—N/a	1 (Note: Candidate R. Darroch stood in Central Dunbartonshire.)	0	New			—	312	0.0	New
Irish; National	—N/a	1 (Note: Candidate James O'Leary stood in Acton.)	0	New			—	243	0.0	New
United; English National	—N/a	2	0	0	0	Steady	—	238	0.0	Steady
Independent; Rhodesian	—N/a	1 (Note: Candidate Peter Scott stood in Guildford.)	0	New			—	232	0.0	New
Cornish Nationalist	James; Whetter	1 (Note: Leader James Whetter stood in Truro.)	0	New			—	227	0.0	New
Citizens; Protest Vote	—N/a	1 (Note: Candidate S. L. Bradford stood in Farnham.)	0	New			—	204	0.0	New
Child and Family; Protection	—N/a	1 (Note: Candidate Philip Crome stood in Birmingham Selly Oak.)	0	New			—	190	0.0	New
Public Safety	William; Boaks	3	0	0	0	Steady	—	182	0.0	Steady
British Socialist; Empire	—N/a	1 (Note: Candidate S. Rowe stood in Newcastle-under-Lyme.)	0	New			—	156	0.0	New
Homeland; Party	—N/a	1 (Note: Candidate Ian MacKillian stood in Orpington.)	0	New			—	146	0.0	New
Social; Democratic	Donald; Kean	1 (Note: Candidate C. Campbell stood in Warrington.)	0	New			—	144	0.0	New
English; National	Frank; Hansford-Miller	1 (Note: Leader Frank Hansford-Miller stood in North Devon.)	0	0	0	Steady	—	142	0.0	Steady
Independent; Businessman	—N/a	1 (Note: Candidate Sohan Paul stood in Southall.)	0	New			—	115	0.0	New
Fine Gael (Scotland)	—N/a	1 (Note: Candidate Uilleam Bell stood in Inverness.)	0	0	0	Steady	—	112	0.0	Steady
Anti- Corruption	—N/a	1 (Note: Candidate Ernest Leonard Tibbitts stood in Leeds North East.)	0	New			—	103	0.0	New
Providers Through; Care	—N/a	1 (Note: Candidate Alf Hollander stood in Streatham.)	0	New			—	102	0.0	New
Dog Lover's Party	Auberon; Waugh	1 (Note: Leader Auberon Waugh stood in North Devon.)	0	New			—	79	0.0	New
Socialist (GB)	Collective; Leadership	1 (Note: Candidate Ralph Critchfield stood in Islington South and Finsbury.)	0	0	0	Steady	—	78	0.0	Steady
Revolutionary; Reform	—N/a	1 (Note: Candidate T. Kyle stood in Lincoln.)	0	New			—	77	0.0	New
Police State; Prevention	—N/a	1 (Note: Candidate Jitendra Bardwaj stood in Luton East.)	0	New			—	61	0.0	New
Libertarian; Party	—N/a	1 (Note: Candidate David Dean Wedgwood stood in Richmond upon Thames.)	0	New			—	34	0.0	New
Community; Party	—N/a	1 (Note: Leader J. Harwell stood in Battersea North.)	0	New			—	30	0.0	New
Other non-contested		0	0	—N/a		▼3 (Note: 3 Vanguard Unionist Progressive Party seats, with the party disbanding in 1978.)	—	0	0.0	—N/a
Blank and invalid votes								117,848	—	—
Total		2,576	635			0	100.0	31,221,362 (Note: All valid votes excluding spoiled votes.)	100.0	0.0
Registered voters, and turnout								41,095,649	76.0	▲3.2

=== Votes summary ===
Popular vote
Conservative	43.87%
Labour	36.94%
Liberal	13.82%
Scottish National	1.62%
Others	3.76%

=== Seats summary ===
Parliamentary seats
Conservative	53.39%
Labour	42.36%
Liberal	1.73%
Others	2.20%

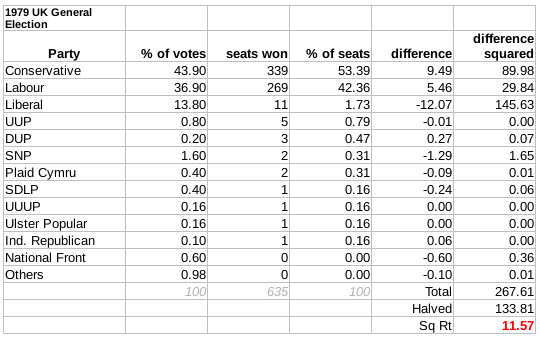
The disproportionality of the House of Commons in the 1979 election was "11.57" according to the Gallagher index, mainly between the Conservatives and the Liberal Party.

=== Results by voter characteristics ===
Ethnic group voting intention
Ethnic group	Party		
Ethnic group	Labour	Conservative	Other
Ethnic minority (non-White)	86%	8%	6%
Asian	86%	8%	n/a
Afro-Caribbean	80%	5%	n/a

== Incumbents defeated ==
Party	Name	Constituency	Office held whilst in Parliament	Year elected	Defeated by	Party
Labour	Geoff Edge	Aldridge-Brownhills		1974	Richard Shepherd	Conservative
Labour	Eric Moonman	Basildon		1974	Harvey Proctor	Conservative
Labour	Alfred Bates	Bebington and Ellesmere Port		1974	Barry Porter	Conservative
Labour	Roderick MacFarquhar	Belper		1974	Sheila Faith	Conservative
Labour	Raymond Carter	Birmingham Northfield	Parliamentary Under-Secretary in the Northern Ireland Office (1977–1979)	1970	Jocelyn Cadbury	Conservative
Labour	Tom Litterick	Birmingham Selly Oak		1974	Anthony Beaumont-Dark	Conservative
Labour	Syd Tierney	Birmingham Yardley	President of the Union of Shop, Distributive and Allied Workers	1974	David Bevan	Conservative
Labour	Caerwyn Roderick	Brecon and Radnorshire		1970	Tom Hooson	Conservative
Labour	John Ellis	Brigg and Scunthorpe		1974	Michael Brown	Conservative
Labour	Ronald Thomas	Bristol North West		1974	Michael Colvin	Conservative
Labour	George Rodgers	Chorley		1974	Den Dover	Conservative
Labour	Audrey Wise	Coventry South West		1974	John Butcher	Conservative
Labour	Sydney Irving	Dartford		1974	Bob Dunn	Conservative
Labour	William Molloy	Ealing North		1964	Harry Greenway	Conservative
Labour	Bryan Davies	Enfield North		1974	Tim Eggar	Conservative
Labour	John Watkinson	West Gloucestershire		1974	Paul Marland	Conservative
Labour	John Ovenden	Gravesend		1974	Tim Brinton	Conservative
Labour	Robin Corbett	Hemel Hempstead		1974	Nicholas Lyell	Conservative
Labour	Alan Lee Williams	Hornchurch		1974	Robin Squire	Conservative
Labour	Shirley Williams	Hertford and Stevenage	Secretary of State for Education and Science (1976–1979)	1964	Bowen Wells	Conservative
Labour	Arnold Shaw	Ilford South		1974	Neil Thorne	Conservative
Labour	Terence Walker	Kingswood		1974	Jack Aspinwall	Conservative
Labour	Bruce Grocott	Lichfield and Tamworth		1974	John Heddle	Conservative
Labour	Margaret Beckett	Lincoln	Parliamentary under-secretary of state at the Department for Education and Science (1976–1979)	1974	Kenneth Carlisle	Conservative
Labour	Eddie Loyden	Liverpool Garston		1974	Malcolm Thornton	Conservative
Labour	Ivor Clemitson	Luton East		1974	Graham Bright	Conservative
Labour	Brian Sedgemore	Luton West		1974	John Carlisle	Conservative
Labour	John Desmond Cronin	Loughborough		1955	Stephen Dorrell	Conservative
Labour	John Tomlinson	Meriden	Under-Secretary of State for Foreign Affairs (1976–1979)	1974	Iain Mills	Conservative
Labour	Doug Hoyle	Nelson and Colne		1974	John Lee	Conservative
Labour	Edward Bishop	Newark	Minister of Agriculture, Fisheries and Food (1974–1979)	1964	Richard Alexander	Conservative
Labour	Maureen Colquhoun	Northampton North		1974	Tony Marlow	Conservative
Labour	Evan Luard	Oxford	Under-Secretary of State for Foreign Affairs (1976–1979)	1974	John Patten	Conservative
Labour	Arthur Latham	Paddington		1969	John Wheeler	Conservative
Labour	Michael Ward	Peterborough		1974	Brian Mawhinney	Conservative
Labour	Frank Judd	Portsmouth North	Minister of State for Foreign and Commonwealth Affairs (1977–1979)	1966	Peter Griffiths	Conservative
Labour	Ronald Atkins	Preston North		1974	Robert Atkins	Conservative
Labour	Hugh Jenkins	Putney	Minister of State for the Arts (1974–1979)	1964	David Mellor	Conservative
Labour	Robert Bean	Rochester and Chatham		1974	Peggy Fenner	Conservative
Labour	Michael Noble	Rossendale		1974	David Trippier	Conservative
Labour	William Price	Rugby		1966	Jim Pawsey	Conservative
Labour	Bryan Gould	Southampton Test		1974	James Hill	Conservative
Labour	Max Madden	Sowerby		1974	Donald Thompson	Conservative
Labour	Helene Hayman	Welwyn and Hatfield		1974	Christopher Murphy	Conservative
Labour	Gerald Fowler	The Wrekin	Minister of State for the Privy Council Office (1974–1976)	1974	Warren Hawksley	Conservative
SNP	Douglas Henderson	East Aberdeenshire	SNP Spokesman for Employment and Industry	1974	Albert McQuarrie	Conservative
SNP	Andrew Welsh	South Angus	SNP Spokesperson for Housing	1974	Peter Fraser	Conservative
SNP	Iain MacCormick	Argyllshire		1974	John Mackay	Conservative
SNP	Hamish Watt	Banffshire		1974	David Myles	Conservative
SNP	Margaret Ewing	East Dunbartonshire		1974	Norman Hogg	Labour
SNP	George Thompson	Galloway		1974	Ian Lang	Conservative
SNP	Winnie Ewing	Moray and Nairn	SNP Spokesperson for External Affairs and EEC	1974	Alex Pollock	Conservative
SNP	Douglas Crawford	Perth and East Perthshire		1974	Bill Walker	Conservative
SNP	George Reid	Clackmannan and East Stirlingshire		1974	Martin O'Neill	Labour
Conservative	Teddy Taylor	Glasgow Cathcart	Shadow Secretary of State for Scotland (1976–1979)	1964	John Maxton	Labour
Conservative	Andrew MacKay	Birmingham Stechford		1977	Terry Davis	Labour
Conservative	Richard Page	Workington		1976	Dale Campbell-Savours	Labour
Conservative	Tim Smith	Ashfield		1977	Frank Haynes	Labour
Conservative	Robin Hodgson	Walsall North		1976	David Winnick	Labour
Liberal	Jeremy Thorpe	North Devon	Leader of the Liberal Party (1967–1976)	1959	Tony Speller	Conservative
Liberal	Emlyn Hooson	Montgomeryshire		1962	Delwyn Williams	Conservative
Liberal	John Pardoe	North Cornwall	Deputy Leader of the Liberal Party (1976–1979)	1966	Gerry Neale	Conservative
Plaid Cymru	Gwynfor Evans	Carmarthen	President of Plaid Cymru (1945–1981)	1974	Roger Thomas	Labour
SLP	Jim Sillars	South Ayrshire	Leader of the Scottish Labour Party (1976–1979)	1970	George Foulkes	Labour
UUP	William Craig	Belfast East		1974	Peter Robinson	DUP

== See also ==
- List of MPs elected in the 1979 United Kingdom general election
- 1979 United Kingdom general election in England
- 1979 United Kingdom general election in Scotland
- 1979 United Kingdom general election in Wales
- 1979 United Kingdom general election in Northern Ireland
- 1979 United Kingdom local elections
