= 1979 United Kingdom general election in Wales =

- 3 May 1979

All 36 Welsh seats to the House of Commons
- Turnout: 79.4% (▲2.8 pp)
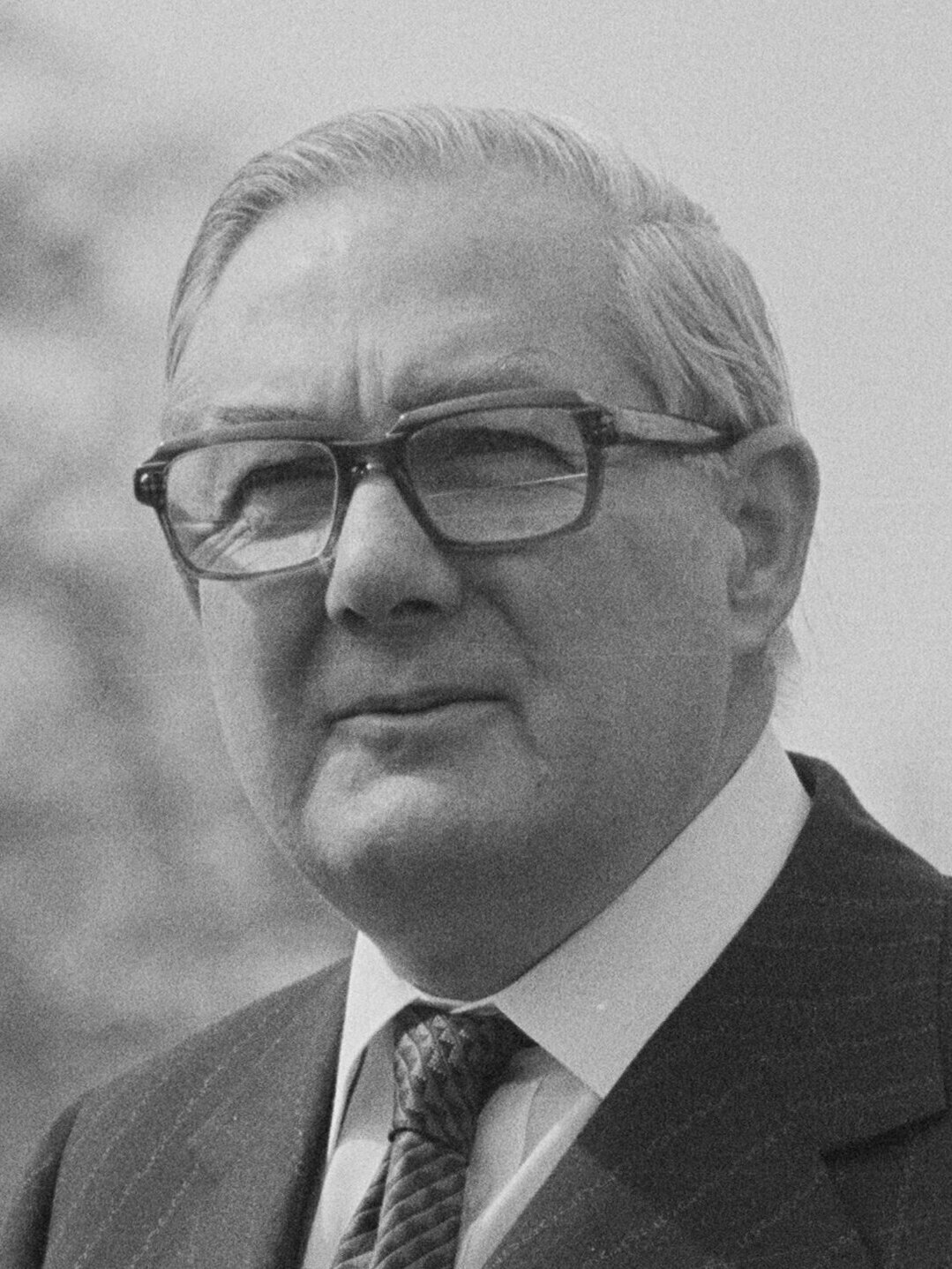

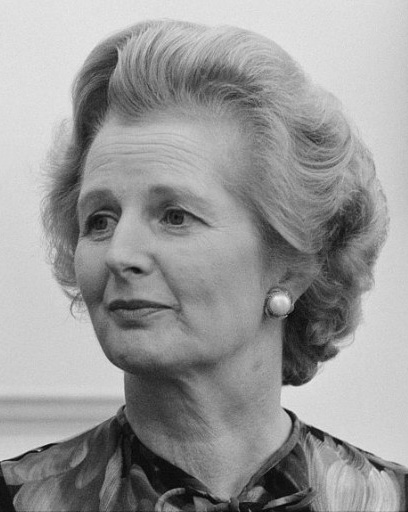

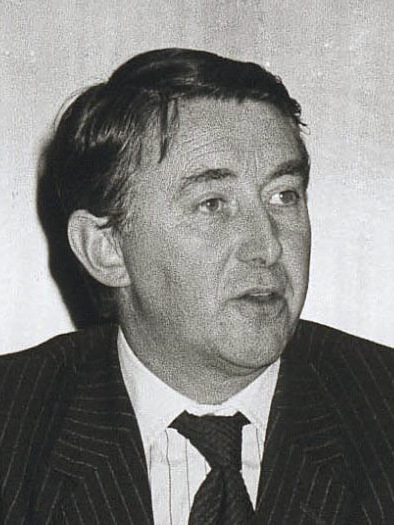

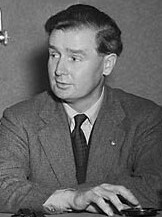
	First party	Second party
Leader	James Callaghan	Margaret Thatcher
Party	Labour	Conservative
Leader since	5 April 1976	11 February 1975
Leader's seat	Cardiff South East	Finchley
Last election	23 seats, 49.5%	8 seats, 23.9%
Seats won	22 (Note: Figure includes Speaker of the House of Commons George Thomas in Cardiff West.)	11
Seat change	▼1	▲3
Popular vote	795,500	526,300
Percentage	48.6%	32.2%
Swing	▼0.9 pp	▲8.3 pp
	Third party	Fourth party
Leader	David Steel	Gwynfor Evans
Party	Liberal	Plaid Cymru
Leader since	7 July 1976	1 August 1945
Leader's seat	Tweeddale, Ettrick and Lauderdale	Carmarthen (lost seat)
Last election	2 seats, 15.5%	3 seats, 10.8%
Seats won	1	2
Seat change	▼1	▼1
Popular vote	173,500	132,500
Percentage	10.6%	8.1%
Swing	▼4.9 pp	▼2.7 pp

On Thursday 3 May 1979, the 1979 United Kingdom general election was held in Wales, to elect all 635 members of the House of Commons, with 36 constituencies being in Wales.

The election was held following the defeat of the Labour government in a no-confidence motion on 28 March 1979, six months before the Parliament was due for dissolution in October 1979. The Conservative Party, led by Margaret Thatcher, ousted the incumbent Labour government of Prime Minister James Callaghan, gaining a parliamentary majority of 43 seats. The election was the first of four consecutive election victories for the Conservative Party, although the Labour Party would remain the largest party in Wales throughout that these elections.

John Morris, Baron Morris of Aberavon was under the impression that Prime Minister James Callaghan would call a general election in the autumn of 1978, but called it off. A Welsh devolution referendum was held in March 1979, two months prior. A Welsh Assembly was rejected, with regional distrust as a potential factor.

== Candidates ==
Below is a table summarising the candidates of the 1979 general election in Wales.

Affiliation	Candidates
Labour Party	36
Plaid Cymru	36
Conservative and Unionist Party	35
Liberal Party	28
Communist Party of Great Britain	8
National Front	5
Ecology Party	2
Workers Revolutionary Party	1 (Note: Candidate G.T. Gould stood in Merthyr Tydfil.)
Socialist Unity	1 (Note: Leader Pat Arrowsmith Gould stood in Cardiff South East.)
Severnside Libertarian	1 (Note: Candidate Raymond William Aldridge stood in Cardiff South East.)
New Britain Party	1 (Note: Candidate E.J. Clarke stood in Carmarthen.)
Total	154

== Analysis ==
The Labour Party won the most votes in Wales, although the Conservatives won most votes UK-wide. However, in Wales, the Labour Party won the greatest amount votes and seats in Wales in spite of the general trend.

The Labour Party, gained one seat, although lost two to the Conservatives. Labour won Carmarthen from Plaid Cymru. Plaid Cymru retained its seats in Caernarvon and Merionethshire.

However, the Conservatives won Brecon and Radnorshire from Labour. Thatcher's Party also won Anglesey from the first time since the old Tory Party had held the seat in 1722. The Conservatives also won Montgomeryshire again long-time Liberal Party MP Emlyn Hooson. Liberal Party did, however, retain its one seat of Cardiganshire.

The Conservative Party retained its eight seats of Cardiff North West, Pembrokeshire, Barry, Cardiff North, West Flintshire, Denbigh, Conway and Monmouth. Overall, the Conservatives gained three seats in comparison to the previous election. At 11 Welsh MPs, this was the greatest number of seats that the Conservative Party had ever held in Wales since 1924, and this would be matched in 2017 and outdone in 1983 and 2019. The Conservative Party had received its greatest vote share since 1959 (when combined with its then allies the National Liberal Party), and only would be outdone by its vote in 2017 and 2019.

== Results ==
Below is a table summarising the results of the 1979 general election in Wales.

Party	Seats					Aggregate votes		
Party	Total	Gains	Losses	Net	Of total (%)	Total	Of total (%)	Change (%)
Labour	22	0	1	▼1	61.1	795,493	48.6	▼0.9
Conservative	11	3	0	▲3	30.6	526,254	32.2	▲8.3
Plaid Cymru	2	0	1	▼1	5.6	132,544	8.1	▼2.7
Liberal	1	0	1	▼1	2.8	173,525	10.6	▼4.9
Communist	0	0	0	Steady	—	4,310	0.3	▲0.1
National Front	0	Did not stand in 1974			—	2,465	0.2	—N/a
Ecology	0	New			—	1,250	0.1	New
Severnside Libertarian	0	New			—	375	0.0	New
Socialist Unity	0	New			—	132	0.0	New
New Britain	0	New			—	126	0.0	New
Workers Revolutionary	0	0	0	Steady	—	114	0.0	Steady
Blank and invalid votes						9,645	—	—
Total	36			0	100.0	1,636,588 (Note: All valid votes excluding spoiled votes.)	100.0	0.0
Registered voters, and turnout						2,061,109	79.4	▲2.8

Popular vote
Labour	48.6%
Conservative	32.2%
Liberal	10.6%
Plaid Cymru	8.1%
Other	0.5%

Parliament seats
Labour	61.1%
Conservative	32.2%
Plaid Cymru	5.6%
Liberal	2.8%

== See also ==
- 1979 United Kingdom general election in England
- 1979 United Kingdom general election in Scotland
- 1979 United Kingdom general election in Northern Ireland
- List of MPs for constituencies in Wales (1979–1983)
