= 1979 United Kingdom general election in England =

- 3 May 1979

All 516 English seats in the House of Commons
- Turnout: 75.9% (▲3.3 pp)
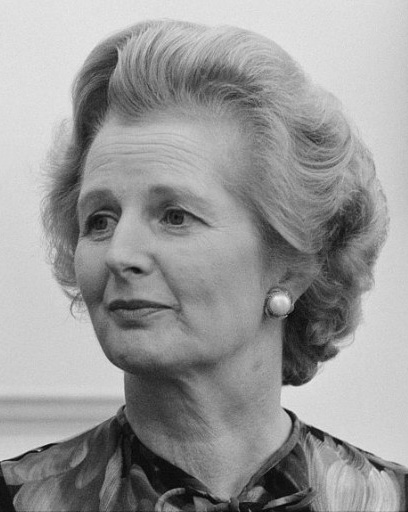

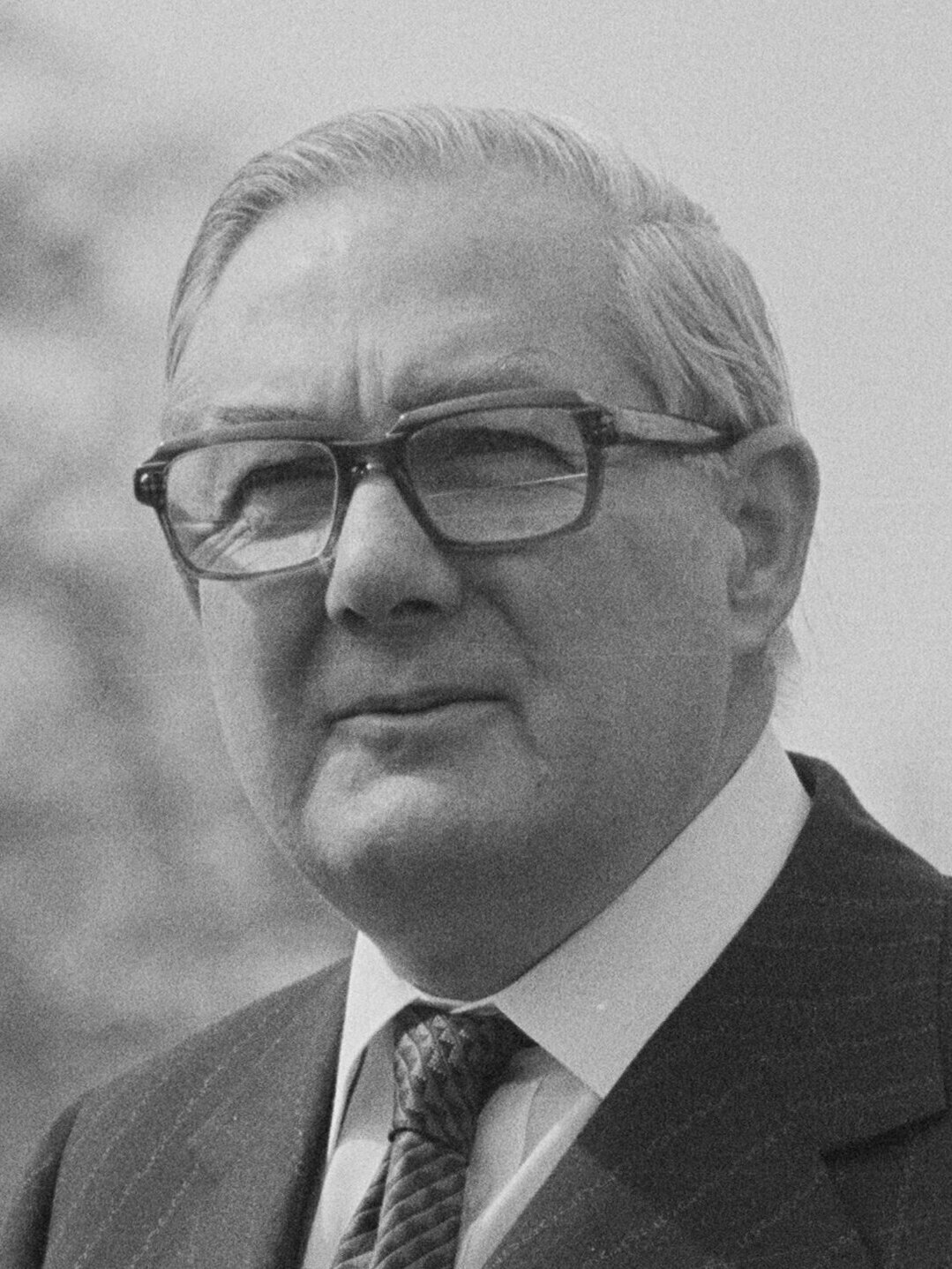

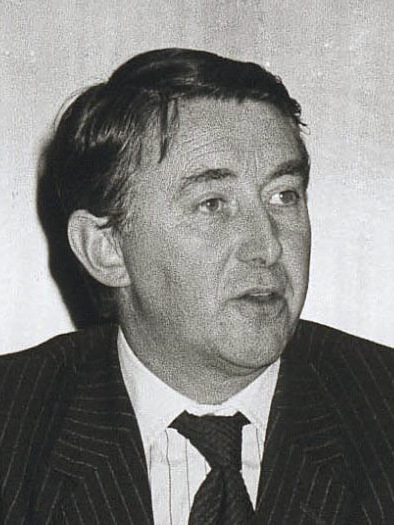
| | First party | Second party | Third party |
|---|---|---|---|
| Leader | Margaret Thatcher | James Callaghan | David Steel |
| Party | Conservative | Labour | Liberal |
| Leader since | 11 February 1975 | 5 April 1976 | July 1976 |
| Leader's seat | Finchley | Cardiff South East | Tweeddale, Ettrick & Lauderdale |
| Last election | 253 seats, 38.9% | 255 seats, 40.1% | 8 seats, 20.2% |
| Seats won | 306 | 203 | 7 |
| Seat change | ▲53 | ▼52 | ▼1 |
| Popular vote | 12,255,514 | 9,525,280 | 3,878,055 |
| Percentage | 47.2% | 36.7% | 14.9% |
| Swing | ▲8.3 pp | ▼3.4 pp | ▼5.3 pp |

On Thursday 3 May 1979, the 1979 United Kingdom general election was held in England, to elect all 635 members of the House of Commons, with 516 constituencies being in England.

The election was held following the defeat of the Labour government in a no-confidence motion on 28 March 1979, six months before the Parliament was due for dissolution in October 1979. The Conservative Party, led by Margaret Thatcher, ousted the incumbent Labour government of Prime Minister James Callaghan, gaining a parliamentary majority of 43 seats. The election was the first of four consecutive election victories for the Conservative Party.

The Conservative Party under Margaret Thatcher won the most votes and seats in England, and gained a parliamentary majority of 43 seats across the country. They received 12.26 million English votes, a record at the time.

== Candidates ==
Below is a table summarising the candidates of the 1979 general election in England.

| Affiliation | Candidates |
|---|---|
| Conservative and Unionist Party | 516 |
| Labour Party | 516 |
| Liberal Party | 506 |
| National Front | 297 |
| Workers Revolutionary Party | 53 |
| Ecology Party | 50 |
| Independent | 33 |
| Communist Party of Great Britain | 18 |
| Other | 85 |
| Total | 2,074 |

== Results ==
| Party | Seats | | | | | Aggregate votes | | |
| Party | Total | Gains | Losses | Net | Of all (%) | Total | Of all (%) | Change (%) |
|---|---|---|---|---|---|---|---|---|
| Conservative | 306 | 53 | 0 | ▲53 | 59.3 | 12,255,514 | 47.2 | ▲8.3 |
| Labour | 203 | 0 | 52 | ▼52 | 39.3 | 9,525,280 | 36.7 | ▼3.4 |
| Liberal | 7 | 1 (Note: David Alton in Liverpool Edge Hill.) | 2 (Note: Former Leader Jeremy Thorpe in North Devon and Deputy Leader John Pardoe in North Cornwall.) | ▼1 | 1.4 | 3,878,055 | 14.9 | ▼5.3 |
| National Front | 0 | 0 | 0 | Steady | — | 189,150 | 0.7 | ▲0.2 |
| Ecology | 0 | 0 | 0 | Steady | — | 38,116 | 0.1 | ▲0.1 |
| Independent Labour | 0 | 0 | 0 | Steady | — | 23,015 | 0.1 | Steady |
| Workers Revolutionary | 0 | 0 | 0 | Steady | — | 11,708 | 0.0 | Steady |
| Independent | 0 | 0 | 0 | Steady | — | 11,627 | 0.0 | Steady |
| Communist | 0 | 0 | 0 | Steady | — | 6,622 | 0.0 | Steady |
| Ind. Conservative | 0 | 0 | 0 | Steady | — | 5,621 | 0.0 | Steady |
| Mebyon Kernow | 0 | 0 | 0 | Steady | — | 4,164 | 0.0 | Steady |
| Democratic Labour | 0 | 0 | 0 | Steady | — | 3,785 | 0.0 | ▼0.1 |
| Wessex Regionalists | 0 | Did not stand in Oct. 1974 | | | — | 3,090 | 0.0 | —N/a |
| Socialist Unity | 0 | New | | | — | 2,742 | 0.0 | New |
| Ratepayers (Leek) | 0 | New | | | — | 1,451 | 0.0 | New |
| United Country | 0 | New | | | — | 1,033 | 0.0 | New |
| Independent Liberal | 0 | 0 | 0 | Steady | — | 911 | 0.0 | Steady |
| Fellowship | 0 | Did not stand in Oct. 1974 | | | — | 531 | 0.0 | —N/a |
| Anti-Common Market | 0 | Did not stand in Oct. 1974 | | | — | 926 | 0.0 | —N/a |
| Oxford Ecological Movement | 0 | New | | | — | 887 | 0.0 | New |
| Workers (Leninist) | 0 | New | | | — | 824 | 0.0 | New |
| New Britain | 0 | New | | | — | 717 | 0.0 | New |
| Silly Party | 0 | New | | | — | 642 | 0.0 | New |
| Troops out of Ireland | 0 | New | | | — | 638 | 0.0 | New |
| Christian Anti-Abortion | 0 | New | | | — | 569 | 0.0 | New |
| Labour Alliance Party | 0 | New | | | — | 565 | 0.0 | New |
| More Prosperous Britain | 0 | 0 | 0 | Steady | — | 518 | 0.0 | Steady |
| Independent Democrat | 0 | New | | | — | 438 | 0.0 | New |
| Fancy Dress | 0 | New | | | — | 328 | 0.0 | New |
| Irish National Party | 0 | New | | | — | 243 | 0.0 | New |
| United English National | 0 | New | | | — | 238 | 0.0 | New |
| Independent Rhodesian Front | 0 | New | | | — | 232 | 0.0 | New |
| Cornish Nationalist | 0 | New | | | — | 227 | 0.0 | New |
| Citizen's Protest Vote | 0 | New | | | — | 204 | 0.0 | New |
| Child and Family Protection | 0 | New | | | — | 190 | 0.0 | New |
| Public Safety | 0 | New | | | — | 182 | 0.0 | New |
| British Socialist Empire | 0 | New | | | — | 156 | 0.0 | New |
| Homeland Party | 0 | New | | | — | 146 | 0.0 | New |
| Social Democratic | 0 | New | | | — | 144 | 0.0 | New |
| English National | 0 | 0 | 0 | Steady | — | 142 | 0.0 | Steady |
| Independent Businessman | 0 | New | | | — | 115 | 0.0 | New |
| Anti-Corruption | 0 | New | | | — | 103 | 0.0 | New |
| Providers Through Care | 0 | New | | | — | 102 | 0.0 | New |
| Dog Lover's Party | 0 | New | | | — | 79 | 0.0 | New |
| Socialist (GB) | 0 | 0 | 0 | Steady | — | 78 | 0.0 | Steady |
| Revolutionary Reform | 0 | New | | | — | 77 | 0.0 | New |
| Police State Prevention | 0 | New | | | — | 61 | 0.0 | New |
| Libertarian Party | 0 | New | | | — | 34 | 0.0 | New |
| Community Party | 0 | New | | | — | 30 | 0.0 | New |
| Blank and invalid votes | | | | | | 97,360 | — | — |
| Total | 516 | | | 0 | 100.0 | 25,972,250 (Note: All valid votes excluding spoiled votes.) | 100.0 | 0.0 |
| Registered voters, and turnout | | | | | | 34,211,471 | 75.9 | ▲3.3 |

Popular vote
| Conservative | 47.2% |
| Labour | 36.7% |
| Liberal | 14.9% |
| Other | 1.1% |

Parliament seats
| Conservative | 59.3% |
| Labour | 39.3% |
| Liberal | 1.4% |

== By region ==
Note: the following tables indicate the results according to the regions of England which were established in 1994. These regions were not used at the time for the purposes of this election.

=== East Midlands ===
| Party | Seats | | | | | Aggregate votes | | |
| Party | Total | Gains | Losses | Net | Of all (%) | Total | Of all (%) | Change (%) |
|---|---|---|---|---|---|---|---|---|
| Conservative | 23 | 5 | 0 | ▲5 | 59.0 | —N/a | 46.8 | ▲8.3 |
| Labour | 16 | 0 | 5 | ▼5 | 41.0 | —N/a | 38.6 | ▼3.6 |
| Liberal | 0 | 0 | 0 | Steady | 0.0 | —N/a | 13.7 | ▼4.3 |
| Others | 0 | 0 | 0 | Steady | 0.0 | —N/a | 0.9 | ▼0.5 |
| Total | 39 | | | | | —N/a | | |

=== East of England ===
| Party | Seats | | | | | Aggregate votes | | |
| Party | Total | Gains | Losses | Net | Of all (%) | Total | Of all (%) | Change (%) |
|---|---|---|---|---|---|---|---|---|
| Conservative | 39 | 8 | 0 | ▲8 | 86.7 | —N/a | 51.5 | ▲9.4 |
| Labour | 5 | 0 | 8 | ▼8 | 11.1 | —N/a | 31.9 | ▼4.3 |
| Liberal | 1 | 0 | 0 | Steady | 2.2 | —N/a | 15.8 | ▼5.8 |
| Others | 0 | 0 | 0 | Steady | 0.0 | —N/a | 0.9 | ▲0.7 |
| Total | 45 | | | | | —N/a | | |

=== Greater London ===
| Party | Seats | | | | | Aggregate votes | | |
| Party | Total | Gains | Losses | Net | Of all (%) | Total | Of all (%) | Change (%) |
|---|---|---|---|---|---|---|---|---|
| Conservative | 50 | 9 | 0 | ▲9 | 54.3 | —N/a | 46.0 | ▲8.6 |
| Labour | 42 | 0 | 9 | ▼9 | 45.7 | —N/a | 39.6 | ▼4.3 |
| Liberal | 0 | 0 | 0 | Steady | 0.0 | —N/a | 11.9 | ▼5.1 |
| Others | 0 | 0 | 0 | Steady | 0.0 | —N/a | 2.4 | ▲0.6 |
| Total | 92 | | | | | —N/a | | |

Greater London

=== North East England ===
| Party | Seats | | | | | Aggregate votes | | |
| Party | Total | Gains | Losses | Net | Of all (%) | Total | Of all (%) | Change (%) |
|---|---|---|---|---|---|---|---|---|
| Labour | 26 | 0 | 0 | Steady | 83.9 | —N/a | 51.8 | ▼2.1 |
| Conservative | 4 | 0 | 0 | Steady | 12.9 | —N/a | 34.2 | ▲6.1 |
| Liberal | 1 | 0 | 0 | Steady | 3.2 | —N/a | 12.2 | ▼4.2 |
| Others | 0 | 0 | 0 | Steady | 0.0 | —N/a | 1.7 | ▲0.1 |
| Total | 31 | | | | | —N/a | | |

=== North West England ===
| Party | Seats | | | | | Aggregate votes | | |
| Party | Total | Gains | Losses | Net | Of all (%) | Total | Of all (%) | Change (%) |
|---|---|---|---|---|---|---|---|---|
| Labour | 48 | 0 | 0 | ▼7 | 58.5 | —N/a | 42.4 | ▼2.1 |
| Conservative | 32 | 0 | 0 | ▲6 | 39.0 | —N/a | 43.9 | ▲6.7 |
| Liberal | 2 | 1 | 0 | ▲1 | 2.4 | —N/a | 13.0 | ▼4.9 |
| Others | 0 | 0 | 0 | Steady | 0.0 | —N/a | 0.6 | ▲0.2 |
| Total | 82 | | | | | —N/a | | |

=== South East England ===
| Party | Seats | | | | | Aggregate votes | | |
| Party | Total | Gains | Losses | Net | Of all (%) | Total | Of all (%) | Change (%) |
|---|---|---|---|---|---|---|---|---|
| Conservative | 67 | 6 | 0 | ▲6 | 95.7 | —N/a | 55.8 | ▲9.1 |
| Labour | 2 | 0 | 6 | ▼6 | 2.9 | —N/a | 24.8 | ▼3.7 |
| Liberal | 1 | 0 | 0 | Steady | 1.4 | —N/a | 18.2 | ▼6.1 |
| Others | 0 | 0 | 0 | Steady | 0.0 | —N/a | 1.1 | ▲0.5 |
| Total | 70 | | | | | —N/a | | |

=== South West England ===
| Party | Seats | | | | | Aggregate votes | | |
| Party | Total | Gains | Losses | Net | Of all (%) | Total | Of all (%) | Change (%) |
|---|---|---|---|---|---|---|---|---|
| Conservative | 40 | 5 | 0 | ▲5 | 87.0 | —N/a | 51.9 | ▲8.3 |
| Labour | 5 | 0 | 3 | ▼3 | 11.0 | —N/a | 24.4 | ▼4.3 |
| Liberal | 1 | 0 | 2 | ▼2 | 2.0 | —N/a | 22.4 | ▼4.9 |
| Others | 0 | 0 | 0 | Steady | 0.0 | —N/a | 1.3 | ▲0.9 |
| Total | 46 | | | | | —N/a | | |

=== West Midlands ===
| Party | Seats | | | | | Aggregate votes | | |
| Party | Total | Gains | Losses | Net | Of all (%) | Total | Of all (%) | Change (%) |
|---|---|---|---|---|---|---|---|---|
| Conservative | 31 | 10 | 0 | ▲10 | 55.4 | —N/a | 47.1 | ▲9.6 |
| Labour | 25 | 0 | 10 | ▼10 | 44.6 | —N/a | 40.1 | ▼3.8 |
| Liberal | 0 | 0 | 0 | Steady | 0.0 | —N/a | 11.5 | ▼6.3 |
| Others | 0 | 0 | 0 | Steady | 0.0 | —N/a | 1.3 | ▲0.5 |
| Total | 56 | | | | | —N/a | | |

=== Yorkshire and the Humber ===
| Party | Seats | | | | | Aggregate votes | | |
| Party | Total | Gains | Losses | Net | Of all (%) | Total | Of all (%) | Change (%) |
|---|---|---|---|---|---|---|---|---|
| Labour | 34 | 0 | 4 | ▼4 | 61.8 | —N/a | 44.5 | ▼1.9 |
| Conservative | 20 | 4 | 0 | ▲4 | 36.4 | —N/a | 39.5 | ▲6.9 |
| Liberal | 1 | 0 | 0 | Steady | 1.8 | —N/a | 15.1 | ▼5.1 |
| Others | 0 | 0 | 0 | Steady | 0.0 | —N/a | 0.9 | ▲0.1 |
| Total | 55 | | | | | —N/a | | |

== See also ==
- 1979 United Kingdom general election in Northern Ireland
- 1979 United Kingdom general election in Scotland
- 1979 United Kingdom general election in Wales
