= 1979 United Kingdom general election in Scotland =

- 3 May 1979

All 71 Scottish seats to the House of Commons
- Turnout: 76.84% (▲2.03%)
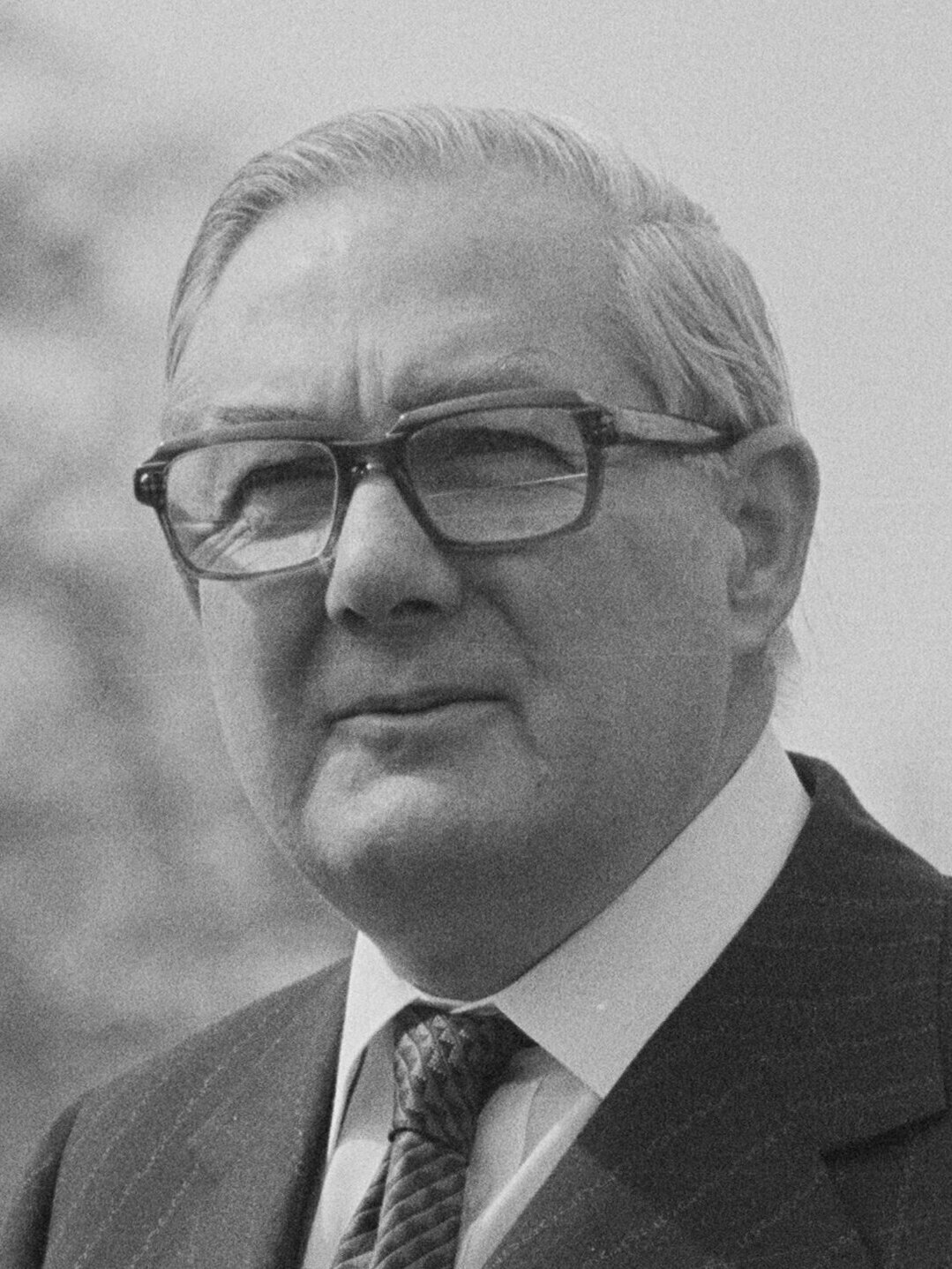

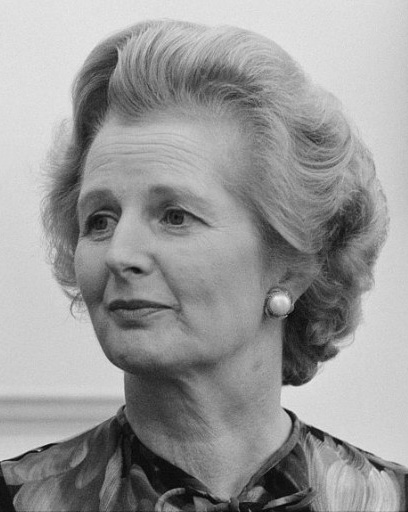

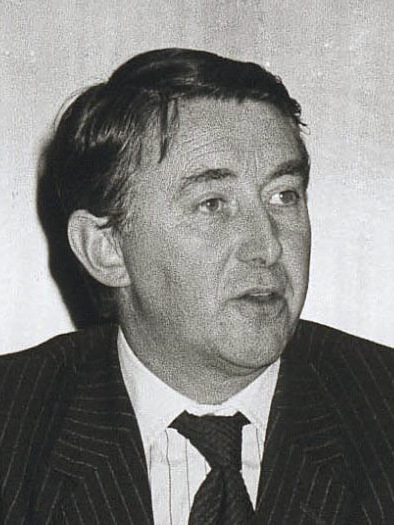
| | First party | Second party |
|---|---|---|
| Leader | James Callaghan | Margaret Thatcher |
| Party | Labour | Conservative |
| Leader since | 5 April 1976 | 11 February 1975 |
| Leader's seat | Cardiff South East | Finchley |
| Last election | 41 seats, 36.3% | 16 seats, 24.7% |
| Seats won | 44 | 22 |
| Seat change | ▲3 | ▲6 |
| Popular vote | 1,211,445 | 916,155 |
| Percentage | 41.5% | 31.4% |
| Swing | ▲5.2 pp | ▲6.7 pp |
| | Third party | Fourth party |
| | | Lib |
| Leader | David Steel | William Wolfe |
| Party | Liberal | SNP |
| Leader since | 7 July 1976 | 1 June 1969 |
| Leader's seat | Tweeddale, Ettrick and Lauderdale | Ran in West Lothian (defeated) |
| Last election | 3 seats, 8.3% | 11 seats, 30.4% |
| Seats won | 3 | 2 |
| Seat change | Steady | ▼9 |
| Popular vote | 262,224 | 504,259 |
| Percentage | 9.0% | 17.3% |
| Swing | ▲0.7 pp | ▼13.1 pp |

On Thursday 3 May 1979, the 1979 United Kingdom general election was held in Scotland, to elect all 635 members of the House of Commons, with 71 constituencies being in Scotland.

The election was held following the defeat of the Labour government in a no-confidence motion on 28 March 1979, six months before the Parliament was due for dissolution in October 1979. The Conservative Party, led by Margaret Thatcher, ousted the incumbent Labour government of Prime Minister James Callaghan, gaining a parliamentary majority of 43 seats. The election was the first of four consecutive election victories for the Conservative Party.

== Background ==
The 1979 Scottish devolution referendum, held on 1 March, had resulted in a majority of those voting casting their votes in favour of the creation of a Scottish Assembly, but the rules of the referendum required at least 40% of the total electorate supporting the proposal, a total which was not reached. The minority Labour government, knowing that many of its own MPs would rebel if they pressed on with the legislation to create the Assembly, refused demands from the Scottish National Party and Plaid Cymru to do so. On 28 March, the SNP joined the Conservatives, Liberals and others in supporting a motion of no confidence in the Government which passed by one vote, forcing a general election.

After the election, Anthony Finlay wrote in The Glasgow Herald that the SNP's support for the motion of no confidence "seemed an odd move at the time", but was based on the notion that Scottish electors would be so outraged at devolution not being enacted, despite winning the support of 52% who voted, that they would turn to the SNP in protest. As Finlay noted, the SNP's stance was to prove a "fundamental error of judgement". At an election rally in Glasgow at the start of the campaign, Callaghan attacked the SNP's role in joining with the Conservatives to bring his Government down. He described them as "turkeys voting for Christmas" and urged his Scottish supporters to "carve them up in the polling booths."

At the end of April, an Opinion Research Centre opinion poll for The Scotsman predicted Labour would win 42% of the votes in Scotland with the Conservatives winning 34%, the SNP 15% and the Liberal Party 8%.

== Candidates ==
Below is a table summarising the candidates of the 1979 general election in Scotland.

| Affiliation | Candidates |
|---|---|
| Labour Party | 71 |
| Conservative and Unionist Party | 71 |
| Scottish National Party | 71 |
| Scottish Liberal Party | 43 |
| Communist Party of Great Britain | 12 |
| Workers Revolutionary Party | 6 |
| Scottish Labour Party | 3 (Note: The candidates that stood were Colin Boyd in Edinburgh Central, Jim Sillars in South Ayrshire and Brian Monaghan in Paisley.) |
| National Front | 1 |
| Independent Labour | 1 (Note: Candidate N.G. Armstrong stood in Glasgow Pollok.) |
| Ecology Party | 1 |
| Fine Gael (Scotland) | 1 (Note: Candidate Uilleam Bell stood in Inverness.) |
| Socialist Unity | 1 (Note: Candidate Walter MacLellan stood in Glasgow Queen's Park.) |
| Independent Democrat | 1 (Note: Candidate R.B. Hilton stood in Glasgow Pollok.) |
| Christian Democrat | 1 (Note: Candidate R. Darroch stood in Central Dunbartonshire.) |
| Total | 284 |

== Outcome ==
Of the 11 SNP MPs elected at the previous election, seven were defeated by Conservatives and two by Labour candidates. The two surviving SNP MPs were Gordon Wilson in Dundee East and Donald Stewart in the Western Isles. Wilson's survival was attributed by Anthony Finlay as being due to Labour's choice of Jimmy Reid as their candidate to oppose him. Labour also gained Glasgow Cathcart from the Conservative's Shadow Secretary of State for Scotland Teddy Taylor. Jim Sillars, a former Labour MP who had led the breakaway Scottish Labour Party lost his South Ayrshire seat to Labour's George Foulkes, although that represented no change in the seat from the last election.

When combined with results from across the United Kingdom, the election saw a 5.2% swing from Labour to the Conservatives, the largest swing since the 1945 election. Margaret Thatcher became the UK's first female prime minister.

== Results ==
| Party | Seats | | | | | Aggregate votes | | |
| Party | Total | Gains | Losses | Net | Of total (%) | Total | Of total (%) | Change (%) |
|---|---|---|---|---|---|---|---|---|
| Labour | 44 | 3 | 0 | ▲3 | 62.0 | 1,211,445 | 41.5 | ▲5.2 |
| Conservative | 22 | 7 | 1 | ▲6 | 30.9 | 916,155 | 31.4 | ▲6.7 |
| Liberal | 3 | 0 | 0 | Steady | 4.2 | 262,224 | 9.0 | ▲0.7 |
| SNP | 2 | 0 | 9 | ▼9 | 2.8 | 504,259 | 17.3 | ▼13.1 |
| SLP | 0 | New | | | — | 13,737 | 0.5 | New |
| Communist | 0 | 0 | 0 | Steady | — | 5,926 | 0.2 | ▼0.1 |
| Independent Labour | 0 | Did not stand in 1974 | | | — | 869 | 0.0 | —N/a |
| Workers Revolutionary | 0 | New | | | — | 809 | 0.0 | New |
| Ecology | 0 | New | | | — | 552 | 0.0 | New |
| Christian Democrat | 0 | New | | | — | 312 | 0.0 | New |
| Fine Gael (Scotland) | 0 | 0 | 0 | Steady | — | 112 | 0.0 | Steady |
| National Front | 0 | 0 | 0 | Steady | — | 104 | 0.0 | Steady |
| Socialist Unity | 0 | New | | | — | 92 | 0.0 | New |
| Independent Democrat | 0 | New | | | — | 41 | 0.0 | New |
| Blank and invalid votes | | | | | | 3,331 | — | — |
| Total | 71 | | | 0 | 100.0 | 2,916,637 (Note: All valid votes excluding spoiled votes.) | 100.0 | 0.0 |
| Registered voters, and turnout | | | | | | 3,795,865 | 76.8 | ▲2.0 |

Popular vote
| Labour | 41.5% |
| Conservative | 31.4% |
| SNP | 17.3% |
| Liberal | 9.0% |
| Other | 0.6% |

Parliamentary seats
| Labour | 62.0% |
| Conservative | 31.0% |
| Liberal | 4.2% |
| SNP | 2.81% |

== Incumbents defeated ==
| Party | Name | Constituency | Office held whilst in Parliament | Year elected | Defeated by | Party |
|---|---|---|---|---|---|---|
| SNP | Douglas Henderson | East Aberdeenshire | SNP Spokesman for Employment and Industry | 1974 | Albert McQuarrie | Conservative |
| SNP | Andrew Welsh | South Angus | SNP Spokesperson for Housing | 1974 | Peter Fraser | Conservative |
| SNP | Iain MacCormick | Argyllshire | | 1974 | John Mackay | Conservative |
| SNP | Hamish Watt | Banffshire | | 1974 | David Myles | Conservative |
| SNP | Margaret Ewing | East Dunbartonshire | | 1974 | Norman Hogg | Labour |
| SNP | George Thompson | Galloway | | 1974 | Ian Lang | Conservative |
| SNP | Winnie Ewing | Moray and Nairn | SNP Spokesperson for External Affairs and EEC | 1974 | Alex Pollock | Conservative |
| SNP | Douglas Crawford | Perth and East Perthshire | | 1974 | Bill Walker | Conservative |
| SNP | George Reid | Clackmannan and East Stirlingshire | | 1974 | Martin O'Neill | Labour |
| Conservative | Teddy Taylor | Glasgow Cathcart | Shadow Secretary of State for Scotland (1976-1979) | 1964 | John Maxton | Labour |
| SLP | Jim Sillars | South Ayrshire | Leader of the Scottish Labour Party (1976–1979) | 1970 | George Foulkes | Labour |

== See also ==
- 1979 United Kingdom general election in England
- 1979 United Kingdom general election in Northern Ireland
- 1979 United Kingdom general election in Wales
- List of MPs for constituencies in Scotland (1979–1983)
