= Christian Caryl =

American journalist

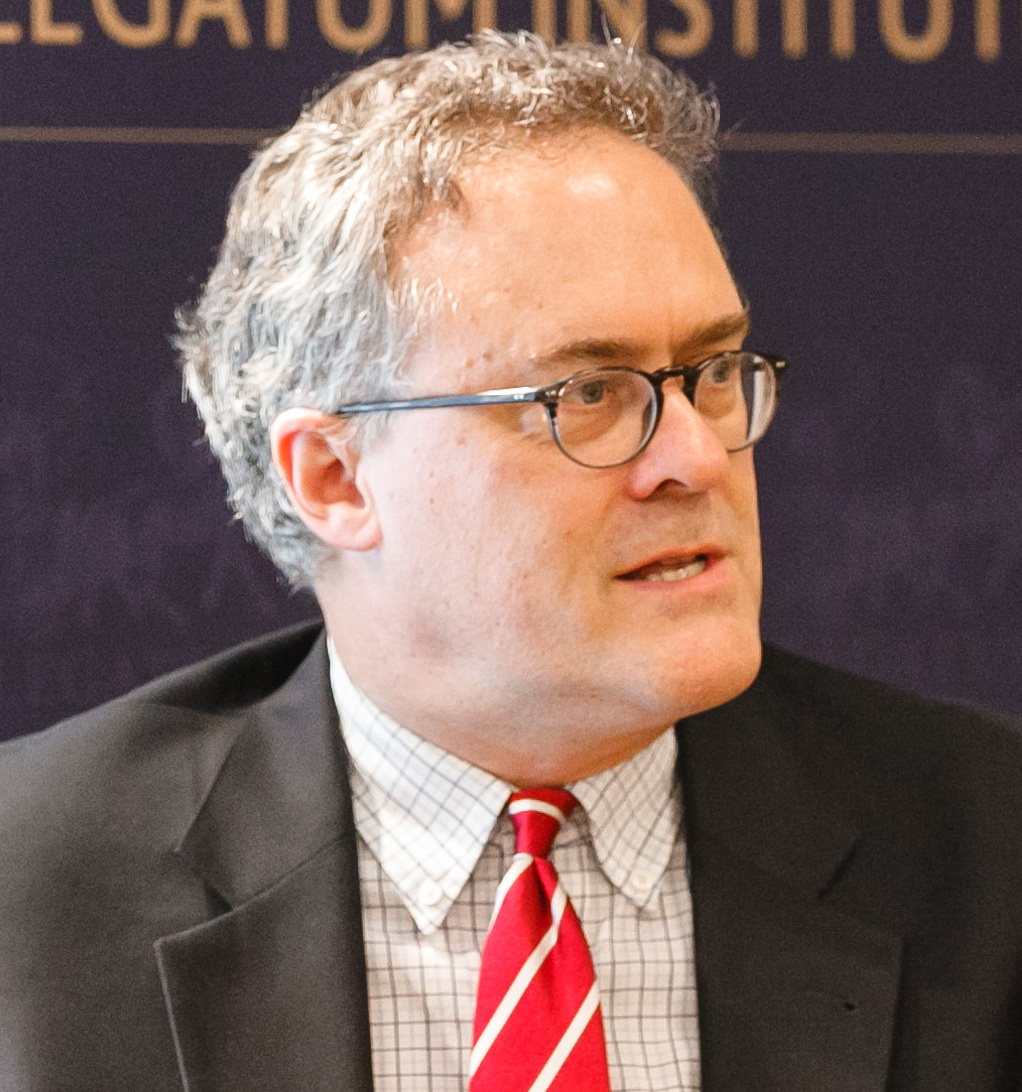
Caryl in 2016

Christian Caryl is an American journalist who is widely published in international politics and foreign affairs. Currently, he is a columnist at Foreign Policy magazine.

== Early life ==
A native of West Texas, Caryl currently resides in the Washington, DC area.

Caryl received a Bachelor of Arts in Literature, cum laude, from Yale College in 1984, followed by a year of graduate study at the University of Constanz (Federal Republic of Germany). He studied French at L’Institut Catholique, Paris, France; Russian at the Pushkin Russian Language Institute, Moscow, Russia; and Japanese language study, Middlebury College, Middlebury, Vermont. He is proficient in Russian and German and has reading knowledge of French.

== Career ==
From 2004 to March 2009 he headed the Tokyo Bureau of Newsweek. Before that, from 2000 to 2004, Caryl served as Newsweek's Moscow Bureau Chief. After 9/11 he reported from Iraq and Afghanistan as part of Newsweek's coverage of the war on terror. During his career he has reported from some 60 countries. From 2017 to 2023, he was an editor in the Opinions section of the Washington Post.

Earlier Caryl served as Moscow bureau chief for U.S. News & World Report, starting in July 1997. Before moving to Moscow, Caryl spent 12 years as a freelance journalist in Germany, where he contributed to publications including The Wall Street Journal, The New Republic, The Spectator, and Der Spiegel. He is also a frequent contributor to The New York Review of Books.

During his journalistic career, he has reported from some 60 countries.

Following the Boston Marathon bombing, Caryl was the first to interview "Misha", who had been accused of radicalizing Tamerlan Tsarnaev.

Caryl's first book, Strange Rebels, was published on April 30, 2013, by Basic Books. This non-fiction book looks closely at the year 1979 and the lasting impact it has had on foreign affairs and economics. Strange Rebels received a positive review from The Economist.

== Awards ==
- 2010 Overseas Press Club award for “Best Online Commentary.”
- 1999 Finalist in the International Consortium of Investigative Journalists Award for Outstanding International Investigative Reporting (with co-author David Kaplan) for “Dirty Diamonds,” an exposé of Russian diamond smuggling in the August 3, 1998 issue of U.S. News & World Report.

== Bibliography ==
- Strange Rebels, Christian Caryl (Basic Books, 2012). ISBN 978-0465018383

== TV appearances and radio broadcasts ==
Caryl has provided commentary and analysis for National Public Radio, Public Radio International, CNN, and the Young Turks.

Following his scoop on "Misha," he appeared on On the Record w/ Greta Van Susteren and Erin Burnett OutFront.

== Published works ==
- 'Misha' Speaks: An Interview with the Alleged Boston Bomber's 'Svengali' (New York Review of Books; April 28, 2013)
- Burmese Days (New York Review of Books; July 12, 2012)
- What About the Iraqis? (New York Review of Books; Jan. 11, 2007)
