= 24 Hours of Le Mans =

Annual sports car race held in France

FIA World Endurance Championship
- Venue: Circuit de la Sarthe
- Location: Le Mans, France; 47°57′00″N 00°12′27″E
- First race: 1923
- First WEC race: 2012
- Last race: 2026
- Distance: 1 lap: 13.626 km (8.467 mi)
- Duration: 24 hours
- Most wins (driver): (Denmark) Tom Kristensen (9)
- Most wins (team): (Germany) Joest Racing (15)
- Most wins (manufacturer): (Germany) Porsche (19)

The 24 Hours of Le Mans (French: 24 Heures du Mans; French pronunciation: [vɛ̃t.katʁ‿œʁ dy mɑ̃]) is an endurance sports car race held annually near the city of Le Mans, France. First run in 1923, it is the oldest active endurance racing event in the world and is widely considered one of the world's most prestigious races. It is part of two informal "Triple Crown" series: the Triple Crown of Motorsport (with the F1 Monaco Grand Prix and the Indianapolis 500) and the Triple Crown of endurance racing (with the Florida-based 24 Hours of Daytona and 12 Hours of Sebring).

Unlike fixed-distance races whose winner is determined by minimum time, the 24 Hours of Le Mans is won by the car that covers the greatest distance in 24 hours. The cars on this track are able to achieve speeds of 366 km/h (227 mph), and reached 407 km/h (253 mph) on the main straight in 1988 – instigating the addition of more chicanes to the track to reduce speed reached. Racing teams must balance the demands of speed with the cars' ability to run for 24 hours without mechanical failure. The race is organized by the Automobile Club de l'Ouest (ACO). It is held on the Circuit de la Sarthe, composed of closed public roads and dedicated sections of a racing track.

The 24 Hours of Le Mans was often part of the World Sportscar Championship from 1953 until that series' final season in 1992. In 2011, it was a part of the Intercontinental Le Mans Cup. Since 2012, the race has been a part of the FIA World Endurance Championship. A 10-hour American version of the race, called Petit Le Mans, has been held annually since 1998.

The most recent running of the event, the 94th 24 Heures du Mans, ran from 13 to 14 June 2026.

== Purpose ==
Launched when Grand Prix motor racing was the dominant form of motorsport throughout Europe, Le Mans was designed to present a different test. Instead of focusing on the ability of a car company to build the fastest machines, the 24 Hours of Le Mans would concentrate on the ability of manufacturers to build sporty yet reliable cars. This encouraged innovation in producing reliable and fuel-efficient vehicles, because endurance racing requires cars that last and spend as little time in the pits as possible.

At the same time, the layout of the track required cars with better aerodynamics and stability at high speeds. While this was shared with Grand Prix racing, few tracks in Europe had straights of a length comparable to the Ligne droite des Hunaudières, often referred to as Mulsanne Straight after the village it leads to.

The oil crisis in the early 1970s led organizers to adopt a fuel economy formula known as Group C that limited the amount of fuel each car was allowed. Although it was later abandoned, fuel economy remains important as new fuel sources reduce the time spent during pit stops. Such technological innovations have had a trickle-down effect and can be incorporated into consumer cars. This has also led to faster and more exotic supercars as manufacturers seek to develop faster road cars in order to develop them into even faster GT cars.

In the 2000s, hybrid systems (flywheel, super-capacitor, battery coupled with both petrol and diesel) have been championed in the Le Mans prototype category as rules have been changed to their benefit and to further push efficiency.

== Race ==
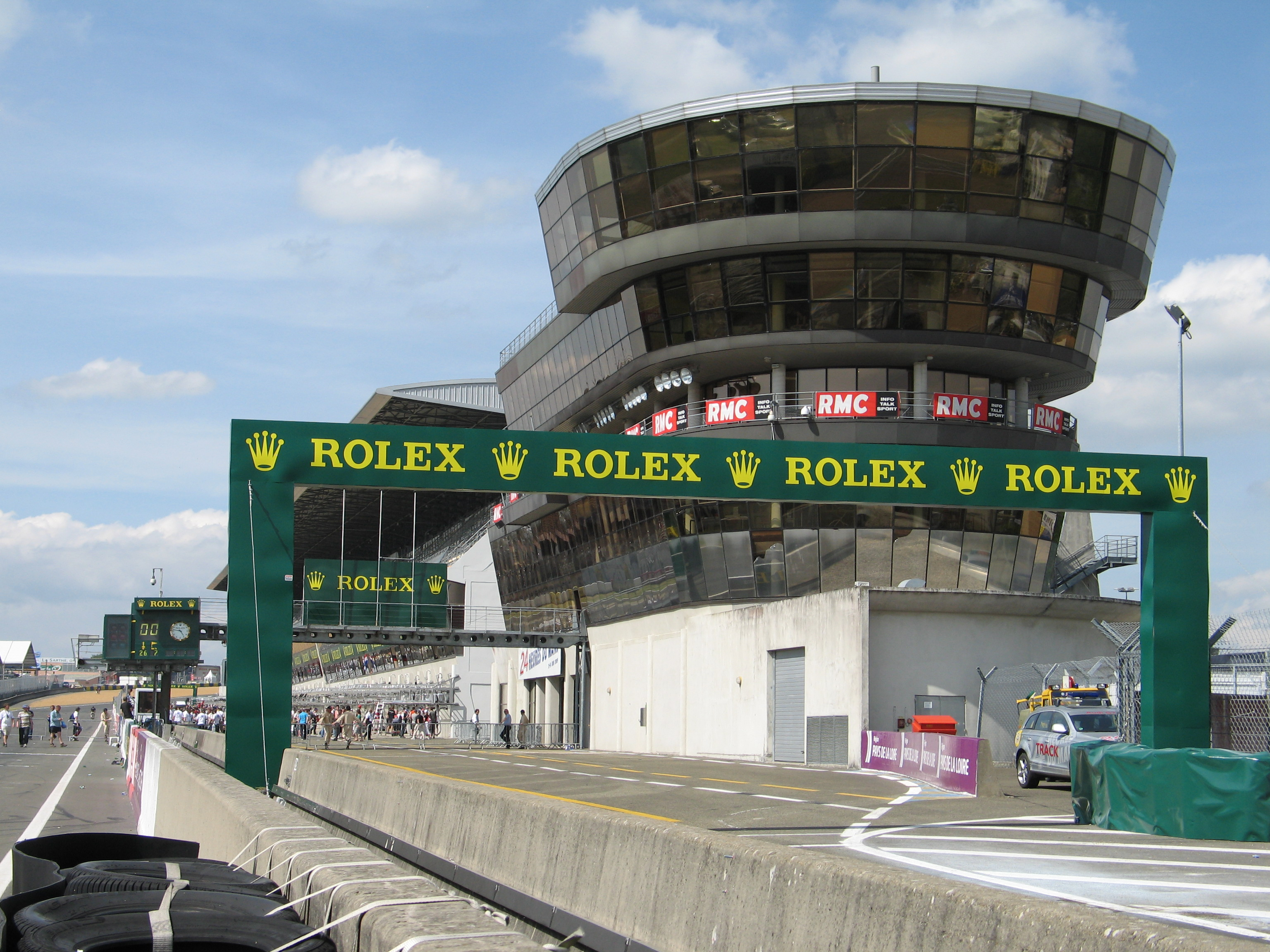
The pits in the daytime

The race is held in mid-June, near the summer solstice, meaning the shortest night and very hot conditions for drivers, particularly in closed vehicles with poor ventilation. Rainy weather is common. The race begins in mid-afternoon and finishes the following day at the same hour the race started the previous day. The 2025 race attracted 332,000 spectators.

Modern competitors often cover well over 5,000 km (3,110 mi). The record is 2010's 5,410 km (3,360 mi), more than six times the length of the Indianapolis 500 (500 mi or 805 km), or about 18 times longer than a Formula One Grand Prix. Drivers and their teams strive for speed and avoiding mechanical damage, as well as managing the cars' consumables – primarily fuel, tires, and braking materials. It also tests endurance, with drivers frequently racing for over two hours before a relief driver can take over during a pit stop while eating and resting. Current regulations mandate that three drivers share each competing vehicle, with individual limits of driving no more than 4 hours in a 6-hour period, and no more than 14 hours total.

Competing teams race in groups called "classes", or cars of similar specification, while competing simultaneously for outright placing amongst all classes. Originally, the race showcased cars as they were sold to the general public, then called "Sports Cars", in contrast with the specialised racing cars used in Grand Prix motor racing. Over time, the competing vehicles evolved away from their publicly available road car roots. Today, the race comprises three classes: the purpose-built Sports prototypes which are also known as "hypercar" and are the highest level in sports car racing, Le Mans Prototypes (LMP) and the production-based Grand Touring (GT) cars similar to sports cars sold to the public which are based on road-going models and therefore, in general, are not as fast as Sports prototypes. These are further broken down into: Hypercar (LMH or LMDh), LMP2 and LMGT3 (GT cars).

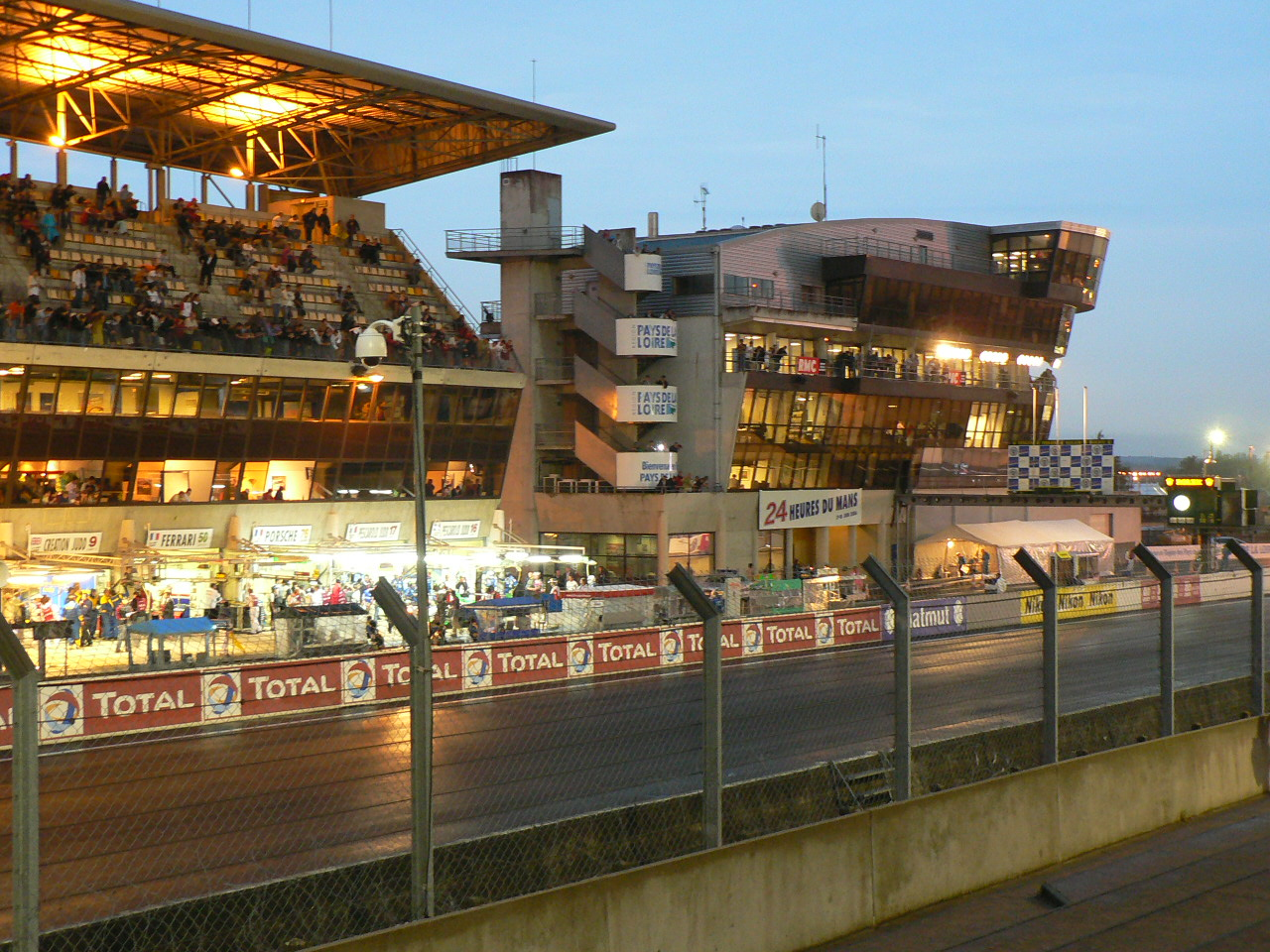
The pits at dawn

Competing teams have had a wide variety of organizations, ranging from competition departments of road car manufacturers (eager to prove the supremacy of their products) to professional motor racing teams (representing their commercial backers, some of which are also car manufacturers who want to win without paying for their own teams) to amateur teams (racing as much to compete in the famous race as to claim victory for their commercial partners).

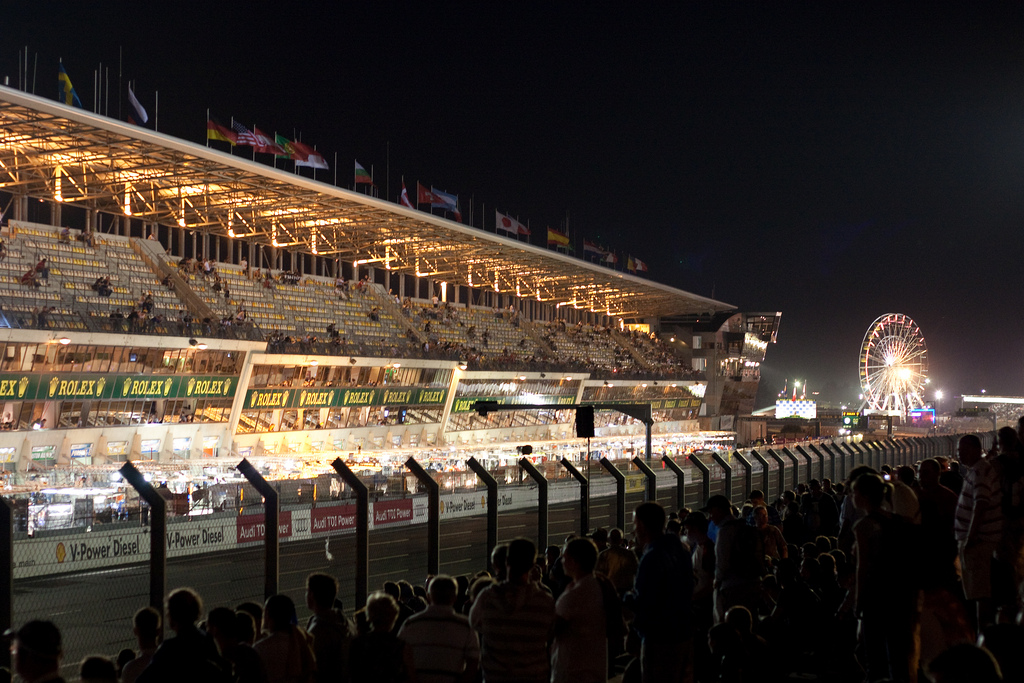
The pits at night

The race was part of the World Sportscar Championship every year from its inception in 1953 until its demise in 1992, except during the 1956, 1975–1979 and 1989–1990 seasons. In 2011, the race was part of the Intercontinental Le Mans Cup, and since 2012 it has been part of the FIA World Endurance Championship. However, winning Le Mans is often considered to be more important than winning the championship itself.

The race is also known as a leg of the informal Triple Crown of Motorsport which links Formula One, IndyCar, and sports car racing to represent a career achievement for drivers. Additionally, it is seen as a leg of the Triple Crown of endurance racing, which links the three largest sports car races together, with the 24 Hours of Daytona and 12 Hours of Sebring forming the other legs. Since 1998, an endurance race called "Petit Le Mans" has been held every year as a 10-hour American version of the Le Mans 24 Hours. From 1999 to 2013, Petit Le Mans was part of the American Le Mans Series along with the 12 Hours of Sebring. Since 2014, the IMSA SportsCar Championship (a merger of ALMS and the Rolex Sports Car Series) has held all four major American endurance classics, which teams can use to prepare for racing at Le Mans.

=== Cars ===
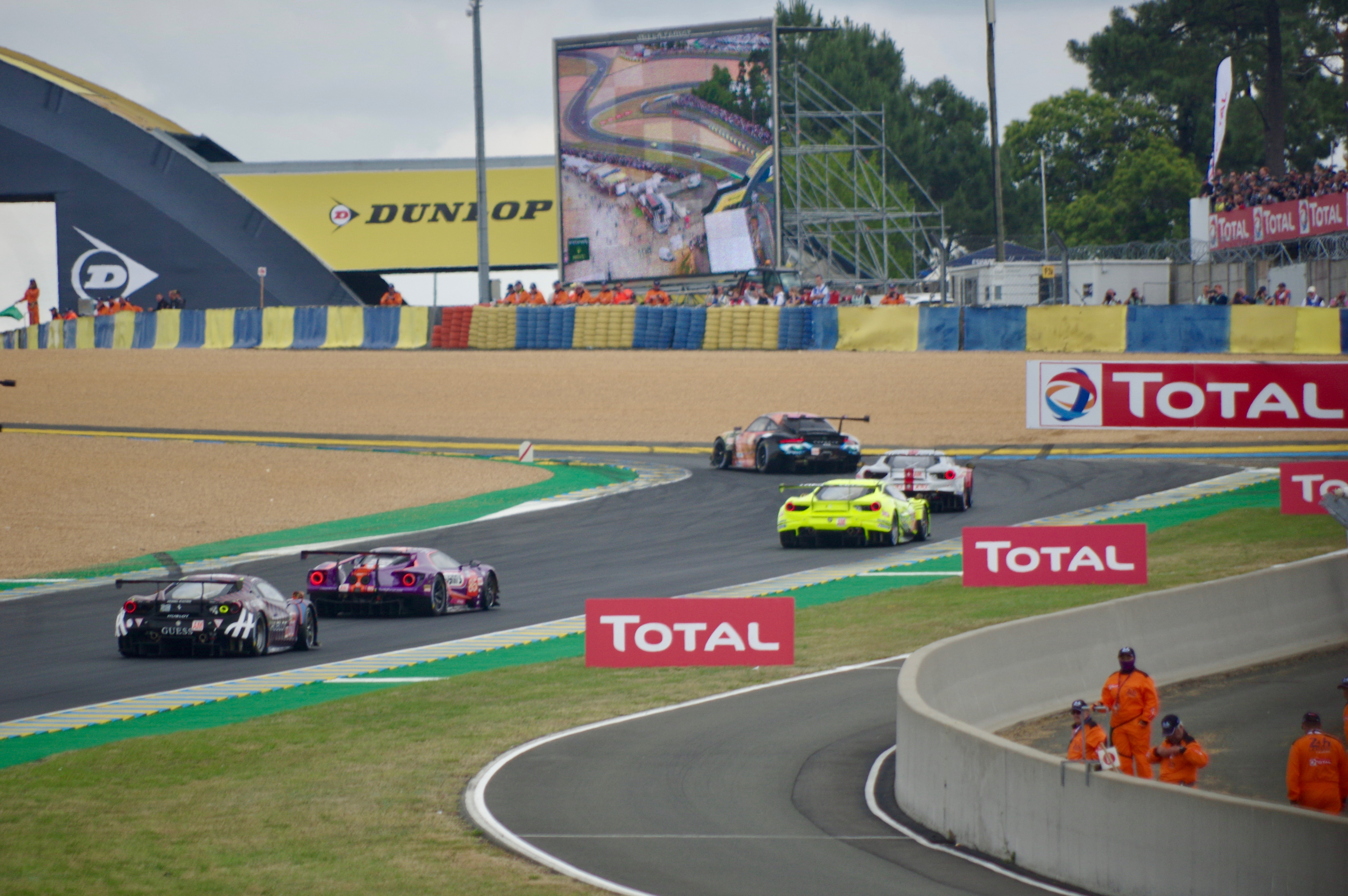
GTE cars approaching Dunlop Bridge

Since 2019, 62 cars enter each race. Up until recently, each car was required to have at least two seats. However, rules were changed which meant cars only need to have space to accommodate a second seat in the cockpit rather than the seat itself. Two doors are allowed; open-cockpit cars do not require doors. Since 2014, all cars in the premier LMP1 category must have a roof for safety; open-cockpit cars are only permitted in the slightly slower LMP2 category. Since 2017, all prototype cars—Hypercar or LMP2—must have closed cockpits.

Although all cars compete at the same time, as of 2021, there are separate classes. A prize is awarded to the winner of each class and the overall winner. The number of classes has varied over the years, but there are now three: Hypercar, LMP2, and LMGT3.

Successor to the Le Mans Prototype 1 (LMP1) is the custom-built Hypercar (LMH or LMDh) class. It is the top class and debuted in 2021. The new technical regulations are intended to prevent cost escalations while enabling greater variety in technical approaches and car aesthetics.

This is followed by the LMP2 class where teams are obliged to run one of four approved chassis – ORECA, Ligier, Dallara, or Multimatic/Riley – mated with a standard 4.2-litre Gibson V8 engine. ORECA is the most commonly used LMP2 chassis. LMP1 teams are not subjected to chassis and engine restrictions. Their extra power, lower weight, and more complex aerodynamics result in much quicker lap times; LMP1 cars also may use hybrid technology.

The next class is LMGT3, which are similar to production-based sports cars.

==== Garage 56 ====
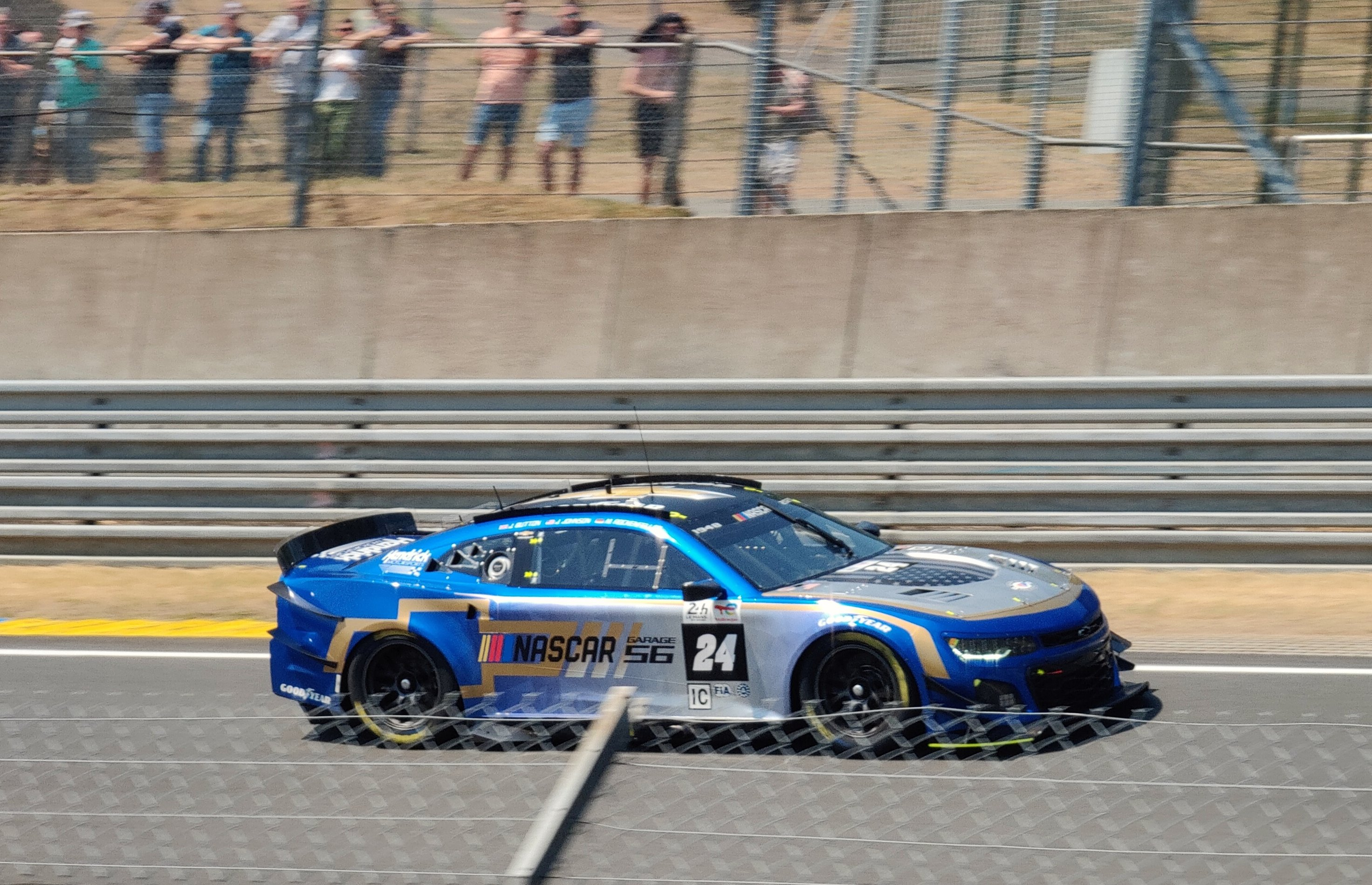
A NASCAR-based Chevrolet Camaro ZL1, the Garage 56 entry in 2023

Concept cars intended to test new automotive technologies may participate in the race under the "Garage 56" banner. Such entries are classified in the race results, though are not expected to be competitive as their sole focus is to demonstrate experimental features.

The program debuted in 2012.

=== Drivers ===
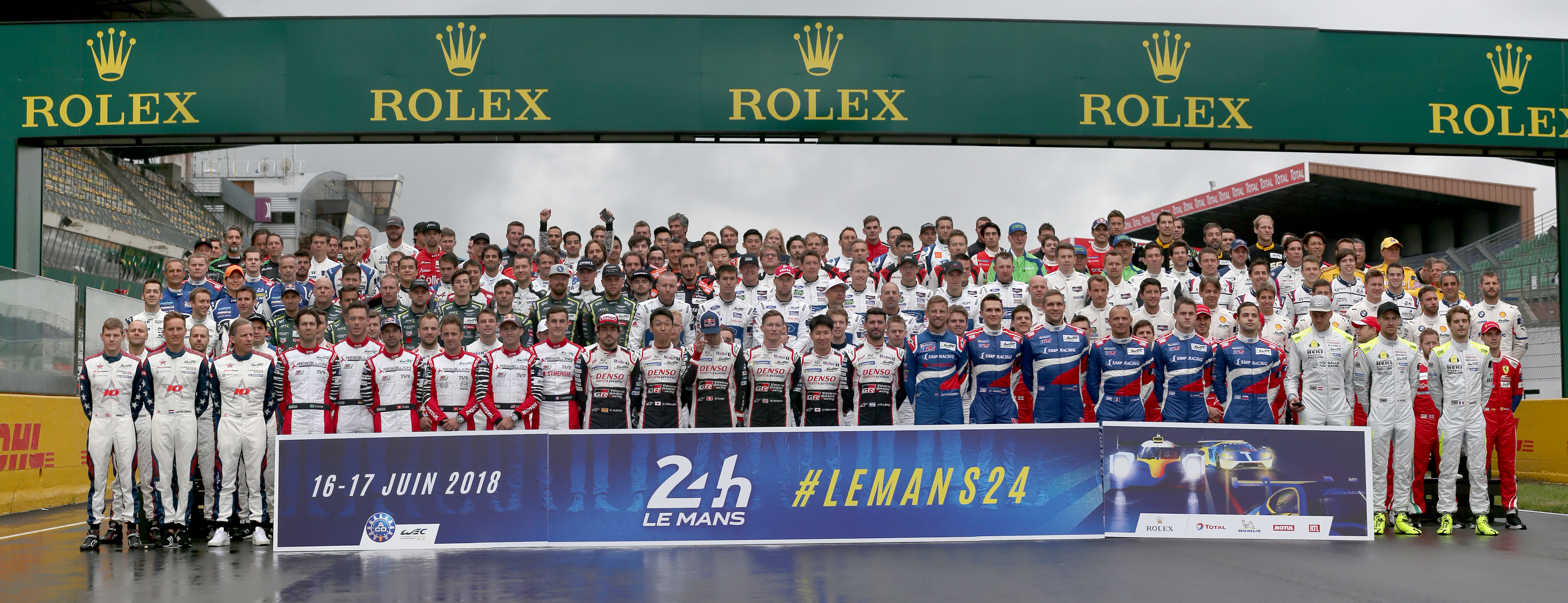
Drivers photograph from 2018

Initially, there were no rules on the number of car drivers or how long they could drive. Although almost all teams used two drivers in the early decades, some Le Mans drivers such as Pierre Levegh and Eddie Hall attempted to run the race solo, hoping to save time by not having to change drivers. This practice was later banned. Until the 1980s, there were teams in which only two drivers competed, but by the end of the decade, the rules were changed to stipulate that at least three drivers must drive each car.

By the 1990s, due to the speeds of the cars and the strain it puts on drivers, additional rules to reduce driver fatigue mandated that drivers could not drive for over 240 minutes (over 4 hours) and that no one driver could run for over 840 minutes (14 hours) total. With careful management of driver stints, this makes it possible to complete the race with only two drivers (as Jeroen Bleekemolen and Cooper MacNeil did in 2014), although the vast majority of teams still continue to use three drivers.

In 2017, the driving time rules were further changed. If necessary, officials may require a drive time limit of 80 minutes of consecutive time behind the wheel and a minimum 30-minute rest break. The rule applies only if the air temperature is at least 32 °C (89.6 °F).

=== Traditions and unique rules ===
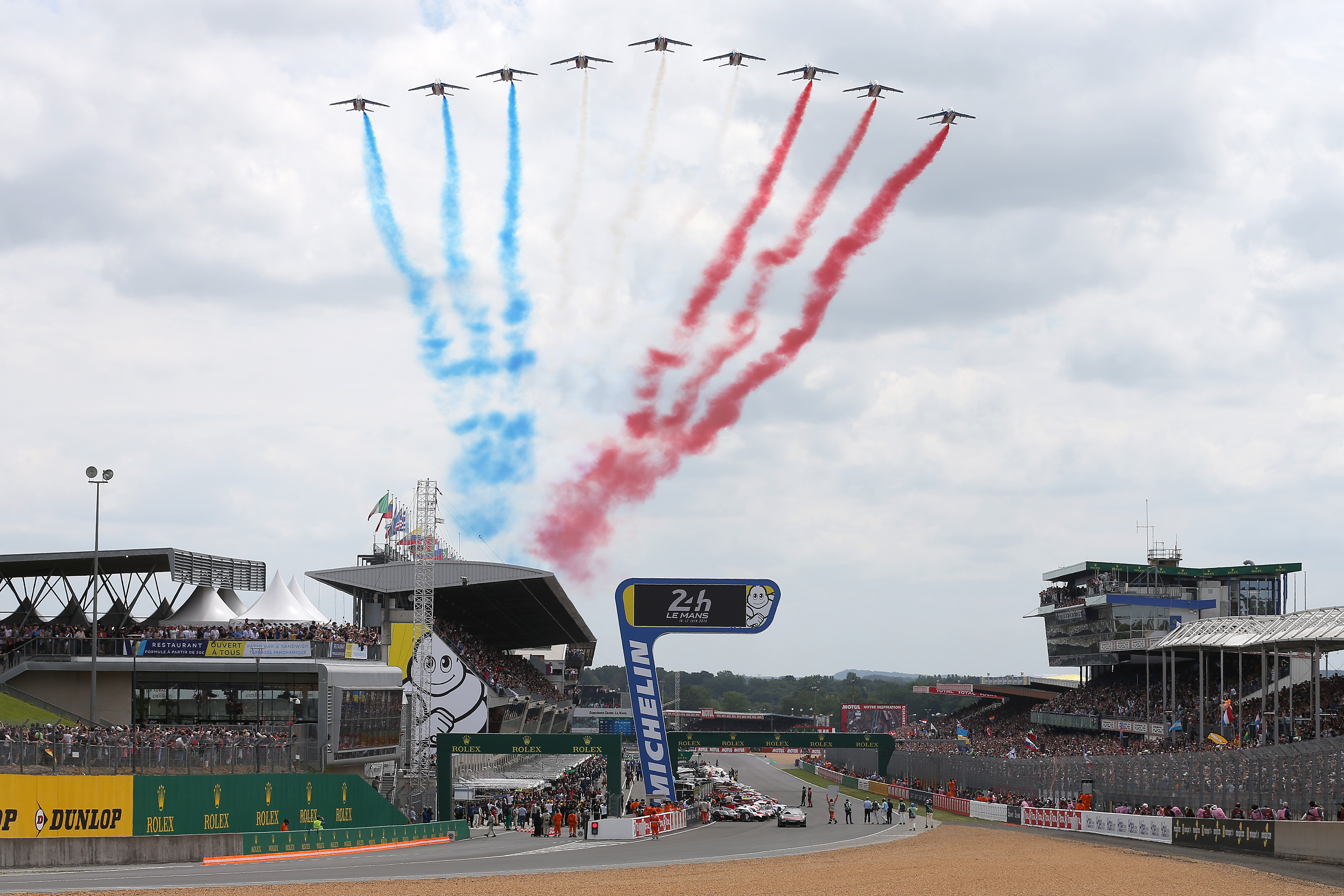
Fly-over with the tricolor of France

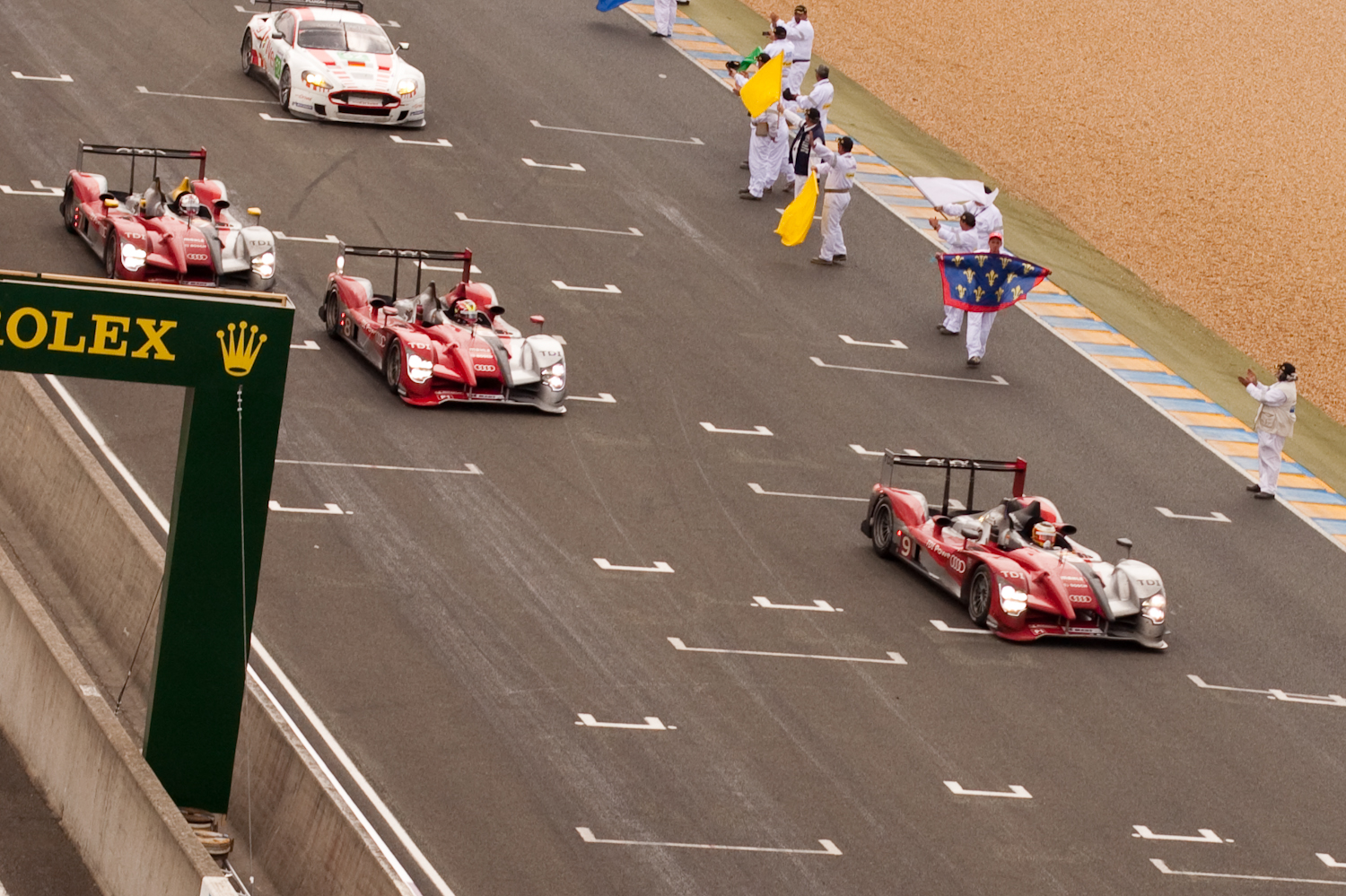
Marshals waving safety flags to congratulate Audi in 2010 race

Although it has been a part of the World Sportscar Championship for most of its existence, the race has had different regulations for safety and competition reasons partly due to its length. For many decades, cars had to run at least an hour into the race before they could refill fluids for the car, such as oil or coolant, except for fuel. This was an attempt by the ACO to help increase efficiency and reliability. Those who could not last the first hour without replacing lost fluids risked disqualification.

Another rule unique to Le Mans is that cars must be switched off while refueling in the pits. Not only is this safer and less of a fire hazard, but it is also another test of reliability, demanding a guaranteed ability to restart many times under race conditions. Another element of this rule is that mechanics are not allowed to work on the car while it is being refuelled (other than helping a driver in or out of the car), which has led teams to adapt innovative ways to decrease the time of these lengthy pit stops. Drivers can get out of the car and be replaced by another driver during refuelling. Those rules are also applied in the FIA World Endurance Championship.

There are various long-standing traditions at Le Mans, including the waving of the French tricolor to start the race. This is usually preceded by a fly-over featuring jets trailing blue, white, and red smoke. A similar flag tradition is track marshals waving safety flags during the race's final lap, congratulating the winners and other finishers.

Le Mans was the venue for the first televised instance of a winning driver celebrating by spraying champagne instead of drinking it. When Dan Gurney won the 1967 race with co-driver A. J. Foyt, the two drivers mounted the victory podium, and Gurney was handed a magnum of champagne. Looking down, he saw Ford CEO Henry Ford II, team owner Carroll Shelby and their wives, as well as several journalists who had predicted disaster for the high-profile duo. Gurney shook the bottle and sprayed everyone nearby. Gurney autographed and gave the bottle of champagne to Life photographer Flip Schulke, who used it as a lamp for years before returning it to Gurney.

==== Schedule ====
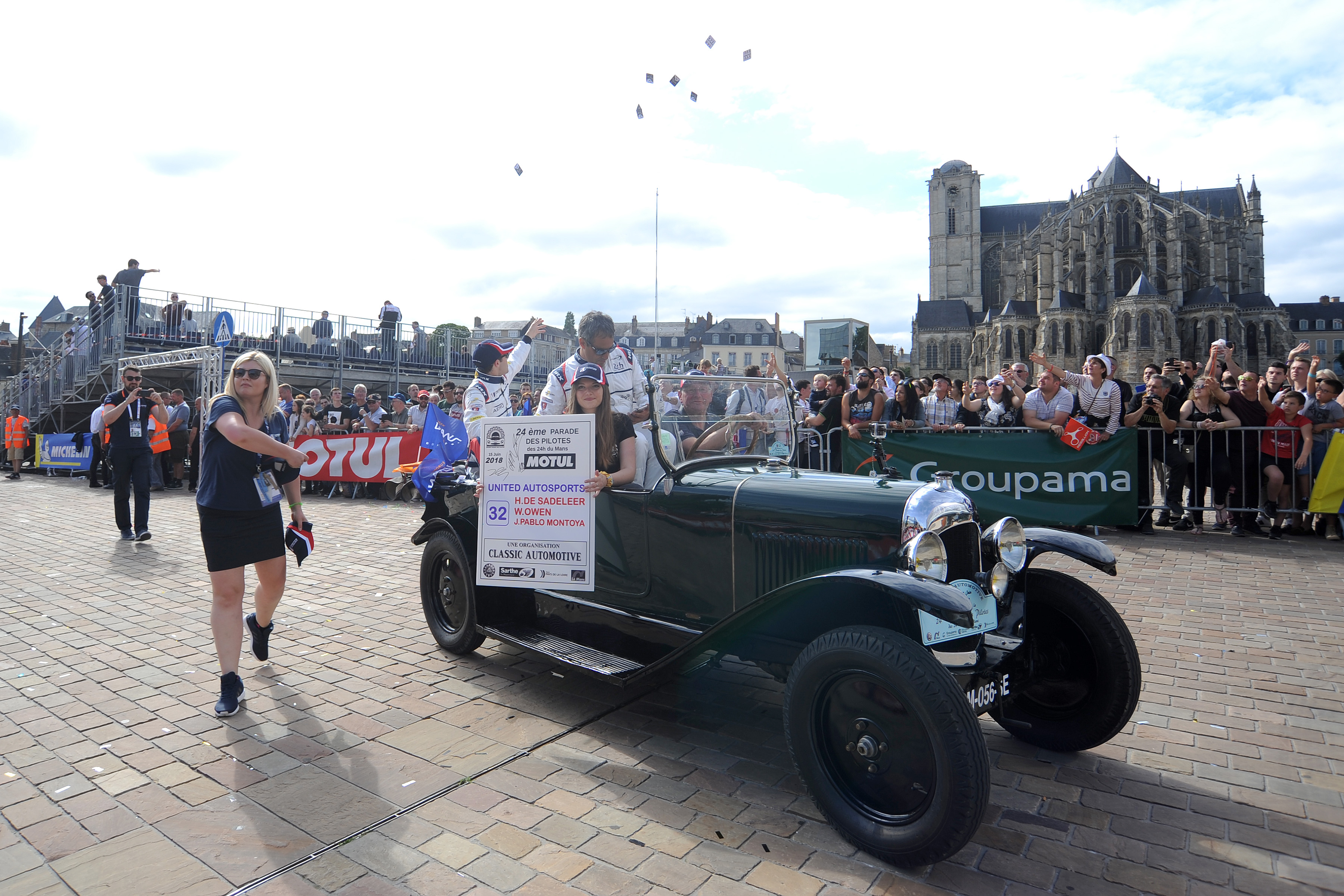
Driver parade in Le Mans in 2018

The first race was held on 26–27 May 1923 and has since been run annually in June with exceptions in 1956, when the race was held in July; 1968, when it was held in September due to nationwide political turmoil in May; 2020, when it was moved to 19–20 September due to the COVID-19 outbreak; and 2021, when it was moved to 21–22 August. The race has been cancelled ten times: in 1936 (a labour strike during the Great Depression) and between 1940 and 1948 (World War II).

The race usually takes place on the second weekend of June, with qualifying and practice taking place on the Wednesday and Thursday before the race, following a car inspection on Monday and Tuesday. Currently, these sessions are held in the evening, with two separate two-hour sessions held each night. Friday serves as a day of rest, and a parade of all the drivers through Le Mans is held.

Test days held at the end of April or beginning of May served as a pre-qualification weeding out the slowest cars. However, in 2005 the exorbitant cost of transporting cars to and from Le Mans led organizers to move the test day to the first weekend of June. Pre-qualification was eliminated in 2000, meaning that all competitors invited to the test would be allowed into the race.

Since 2001 the Le Mans Legend races have mostly been part of the schedule, usually running exhibition races during qualifying days, a few hours prior to the sessions for the Le Mans entrants.

Since its inception, the race has usually started at 4:00 p.m. local time (Central European Summer Time, UTC + 02:00) on Saturday. It has remained that way since 2021.

Following is a list of exceptions to the standard 4:00 p.m. starting time:

Year	Start Time	Reason
1968	3:00 p.m.	Race being in September, as a result of the protests, strikes, and civil unrest in France during the spring of 1968.
1969	2:00 p.m.	1969 French presidential election
1984	3:00 p.m.	1984 European Parliament election in France
1998	2:00 p.m.	1998 French Open final
2006	5:00 p.m.	To maximise television coverage between the World Cup games.
2007	3:00 p.m.	2007 French legislative election
2009–2019	3:00 p.m.	
2020	2:30 p.m.	Race being in September, as a result of the COVID-19 pandemic.

==== Classification ====
Initially, the car that covered the greatest distance from its starting position was the winner. This is known to have caught out the Ford team in 1966. With a dominant 1–2 lead, the two cars slowed to allow for a photo opportunity at the finish line, with Ken Miles slightly ahead of Bruce McLaren. However, since McLaren's car had started much farther back on the grid than Miles's, McLaren's car had covered the greatest distance over the 24 hours. With the margin of victory determined to be eight metres, McLaren and his co-driver, Chris Amon, were declared the winners. The decision cost Miles and Denny Hulme a victory. Miles had already won the other two endurance races at Sebring and Daytona. With a win at Le Mans, he would have become the first man to win all three and the first to win them all in the same year.

The "greatest distance" rule was modified with the introduction of a rolling start in 1971. Now, the car that completes the greatest distance as of the final lap's completion – where "greatest distance" is measured by the start/finish line for all competitors – wins. When two cars finish the same number of laps, their finishing order is determined by the faster overall completion time. This rule was used in the 2011 24 Hours of Le Mans to determine the race winner. The top two finishers completed 355 laps, with only 13 seconds difference between them.

Although "greatest distance run" determines the provisional order of finishers, additional requirements must be met for a car to be classified.

- A car must complete the last lap of the race and complete the entire circuit faster than a prescribed maximum lap time. Ambiguity in this classification requirement has led to dramatic scenes where damaged cars have waited in the pits or on the edge of the track close to the finish line, restarted their engines, and crawled across the line to be listed amongst classified finishers. The practice of intentionally "waiting for the final lap" in this manner has been prohibited by rule in recent years.
- Cars must complete 70 percent of the distance covered by the overall winner to be classified. Even if it finishes the last lap of the race, a car failing to complete this number of laps is not deemed worthy of classification because of poor reliability or speed.

All classification requirements hold except in exceptional circumstances, as determined by the race stewards.

==== Le Mans start ====
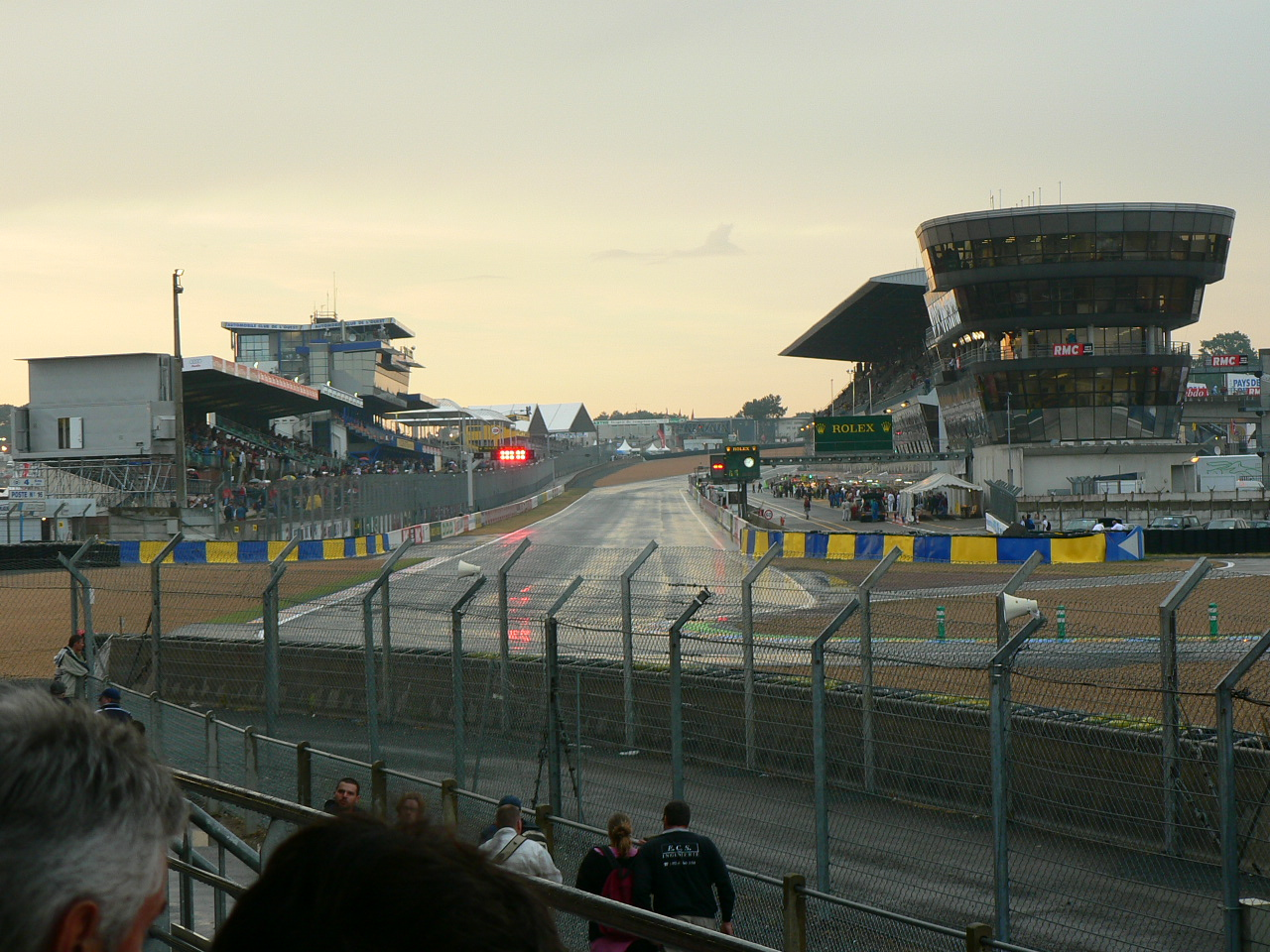
The permanent pits and pit straight for both the Circuit de la Sarthe and Bugatti Circuit

The race traditionally began with what became known as the Le Mans start, in which cars were lined up along the length of the pits. Until 1962, cars lined up by engine capacity. Beginning in 1963, qualifying times determined the lineup. The starting drivers stood on the opposite side of the front stretch. When the French flag dropped to signify the start, the drivers ran across the track, entered and started their cars without assistance, and drove away. This became a safety issue in the late 1960s when some drivers ignored their safety harnesses, then a recent invention. This led to drivers running the first few laps either improperly harnessed due to attempting to do it while driving or sometimes not even harnessed at all, leading to several deaths when cars were involved in accidents due to the bunched field at the start.

This starting method inspired Porsche to locate the ignition key switch to the left of the steering wheel. In a left-hand drive car, this allowed the driver to use his left hand to start the engine and his right hand to put the transmission into gear, which in turn shaves off a few tenths of a second.

Stirling Moss developed another method for speeding up the start. His car was waiting with first gear already engaged. He switched the starter on when he jumped in without depressing the clutch. The starter motor immediately jerked the car forward, but the engine did not start due to low RPM. After a few seconds of motion, he pushed the clutch down, allowing the engine to speed up and start while the car was moving.

Feeling the Le Mans Start was unsafe, in the 1969 race, Jacky Ickx opposed it by walking across the track while his competitors ran. Although he was nearly hit by a faster competitor's car while walking, Ickx took the time to fasten his safety belts before pulling away. Privateer John Woolfe died in an accident on the first lap of that race; Ickx won.

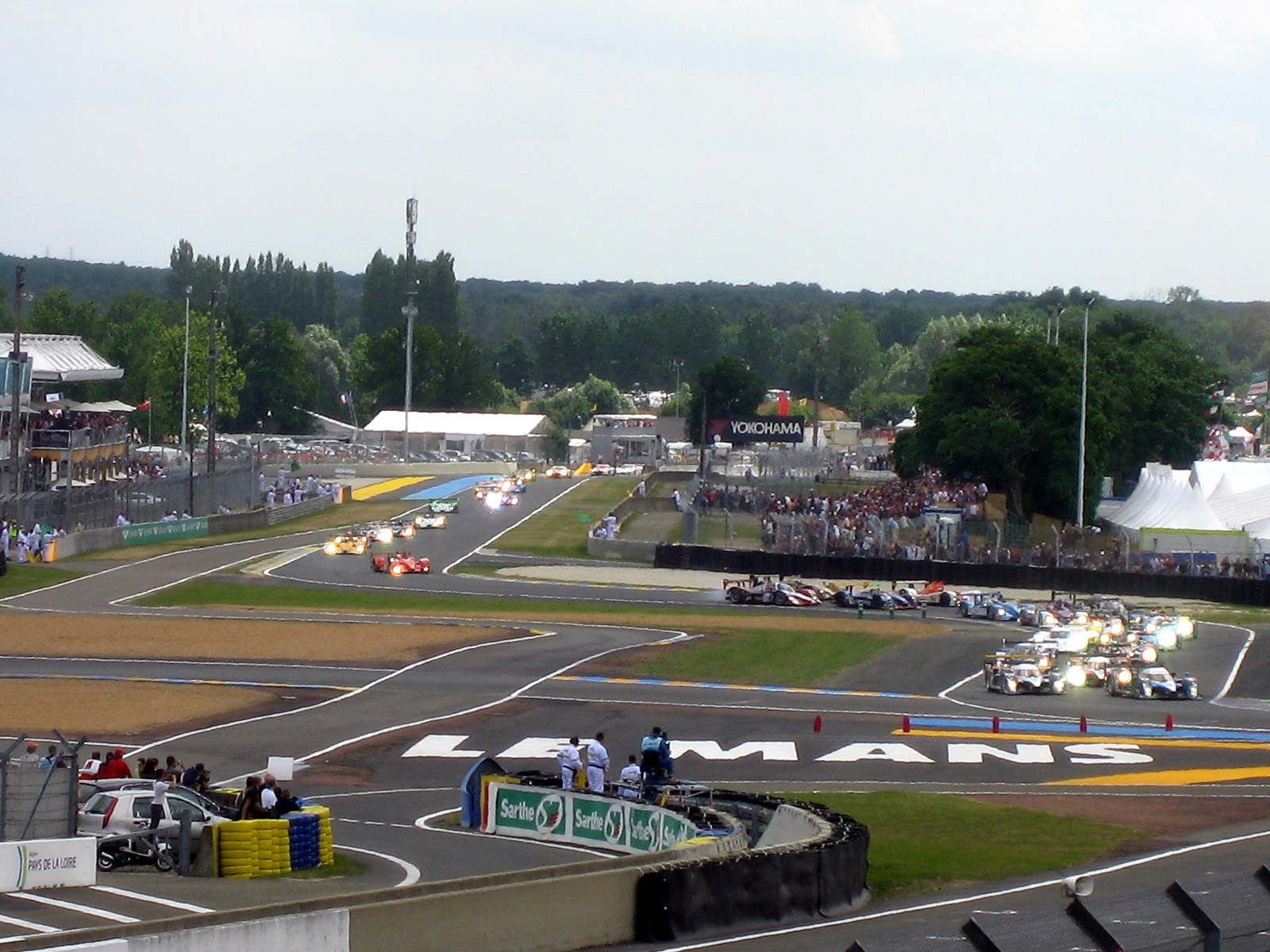
Rolling start of the 2008 race

The traditional Le Mans start was changed for 1970. Cars were still lined up along the pit wall, but the drivers were already inside and strapped in. At the dropping of the French tricolor, the drivers started their engines and drove away. Since 1971, a rolling start (sometimes known as an Indianapolis start) begins the race. While the cars do still start out lined up against the pit wall, when the green flag is waved the cars pull away one by one to begin a formation lap behind the safety car; when that car returns to the pit lane, the starter waves the French flag to start the race.

== Circuit ==
The Circuit de la Sarthe with the Bugatti Circuit (dashed line)

The circuit on which the 24 Hours of Le Mans is run is named the Circuit de la Sarthe, after the department that Le Mans is within. It consists of both permanent track and public roads temporarily closed for the race. Since 1923, the track has been extensively modified, mostly for safety reasons, and now is 13.626 km (8.467 mi) in length. Although it initially entered the town of Le Mans, the track was cut short to better protect spectators. This led to the creation of the Dunlop Curve and Tertre Rouge corners before rejoining the old circuit on the Mulsanne Straight. Another major change was on the Mulsanne itself in 1990 when the FIA decreed that it would no longer sanction any circuit that had a straight longer than 2 km (1.2 mi). To comply with this, two chicanes were added to the 6-kilometre-long (3.7 mi) straight, dividing it into three pieces about 2 km each. The addition of the chicanes was further influenced by the fact that the speed of Welter Racing's WM P88, driven by French driver Roger Dorchy, had been timed at 407 km/h (253 mph) during the 1988 race. This was the record speed before the addition of the chicanes.

Due to the shorter length of the straights, the speed record at Le Mans now, after the introduction of the chicanes, is 366 km/h (227 mph). Typically race cars achieve top speed of just under 320 km/h (200 mph) at the current track (with chicanes).

The public sections of the track differ from the permanent circuit, especially in comparison with the Bugatti Circuit which is inside the Circuit de la Sarthe. Due to heavy traffic, the public roads are not as smooth or well kept. They also offer less grip because of the lack of soft-tyre rubber laid down from racing cars, though this only affects the first few laps of the race. The roads are closed only within a few hours of the practice sessions and the race before being opened again almost as soon as the race is finished. Workers have to assemble and dismantle safety barriers every year for the public sections.

== History ==
=== 1923–1939 ===
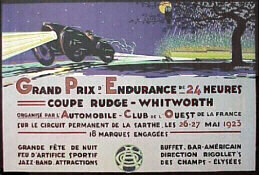
A poster for the 1923 24 Hours of Le Mans

The 24 Hours of Le Mans was first run on 26 and 27 May 1923, through public roads around Le Mans. Originally planned to be a three-year event, as part of the Rudge-Whitworth Triennial Cup, with a winner being declared by the car which could go the farthest distance over three consecutive 24-hour races, this idea was abandoned in 1928. Overall winners were declared for every year depending on who covered the furthest distance by the time 24 hours were up. The early races were dominated by French, British, and Italian drivers, teams, and cars, with Bugatti, Bentley, and Alfa Romeo being the top brands. Innovations in car design began appearing at the track in the late 1930s, with Bugatti and Alfa Romeo running highly aerodynamic bodywork to run down the Mulsanne Straight at faster speeds. The race was cancelled in 1936 due to general strikes in France, and the outbreak of World War II in 1939 resulted in a ten-year hiatus.

=== 1949–1969 ===
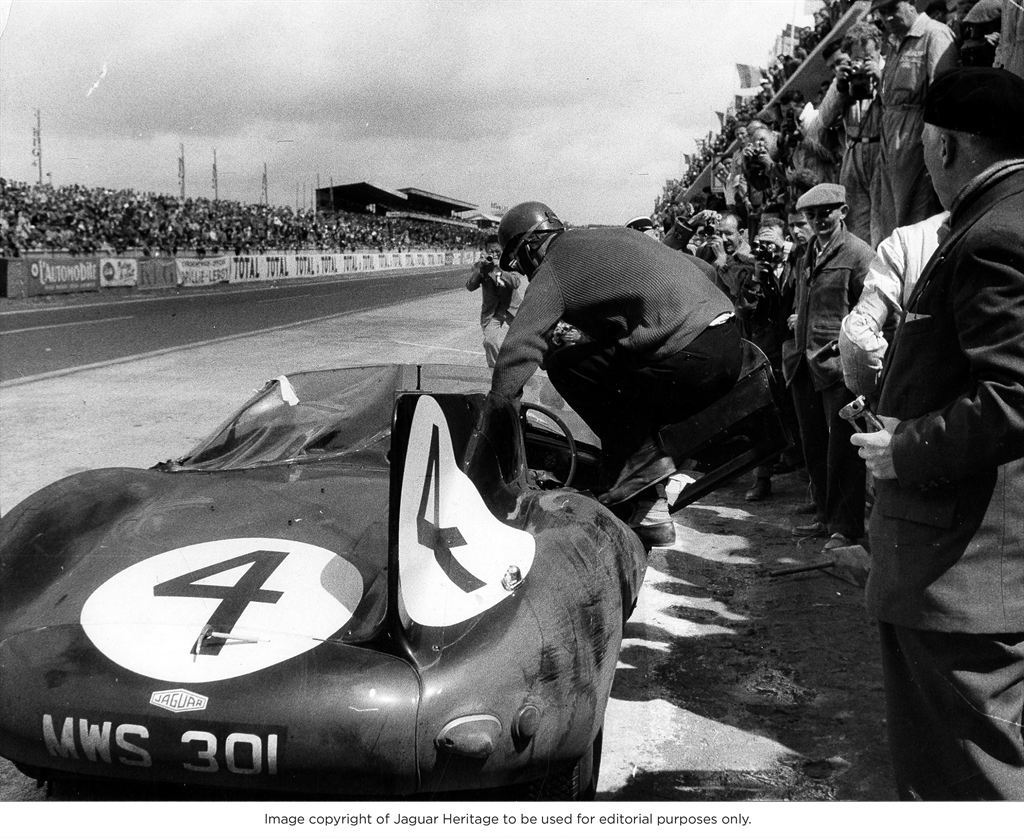
Jaguar D-Type in 1956

Following the reconstruction of circuit facilities, the race was resumed in 1949 with renewed interest from major automobile manufacturers. 1949 was also Ferrari's first victory, the 166MM of Luigi Chinetti and Peter Mitchell-Thomson. After the formation of the World Sportscar Championship in 1953, of which Le Mans was a part, Ferrari, Aston Martin, Mercedes-Benz, Jaguar and many others began sending multiple cars backed by their respective factories to compete for overall wins against their competitors. This competitiveness sometimes resulted in tragedy, as in the 1955 Le Mans disaster during the 1955 race in which Pierre Levegh's car crashed into a crowd of spectators, killing more than 80 people. The incident led to the widespread introduction of safety measures, not only at the circuit but elsewhere in the motorsport world. The entire pit complex was razed and rebuilt further back following the accident, allowing the pit straight to be widened. However, there was still no barrier between the track and the pit lane. Safety standards improved, but the cars got faster. The move from open-cockpit roadsters to closed-cockpit coupés resulted in speeds of over 320 km/h (200 mph) on the Mulsanne. Ford entered the picture with the GT40, finally ending Ferrari's dominance with four straight wins (1966–1969) before the 1960s ended and the cars and the race changed substantially.

=== 1970–1980 ===
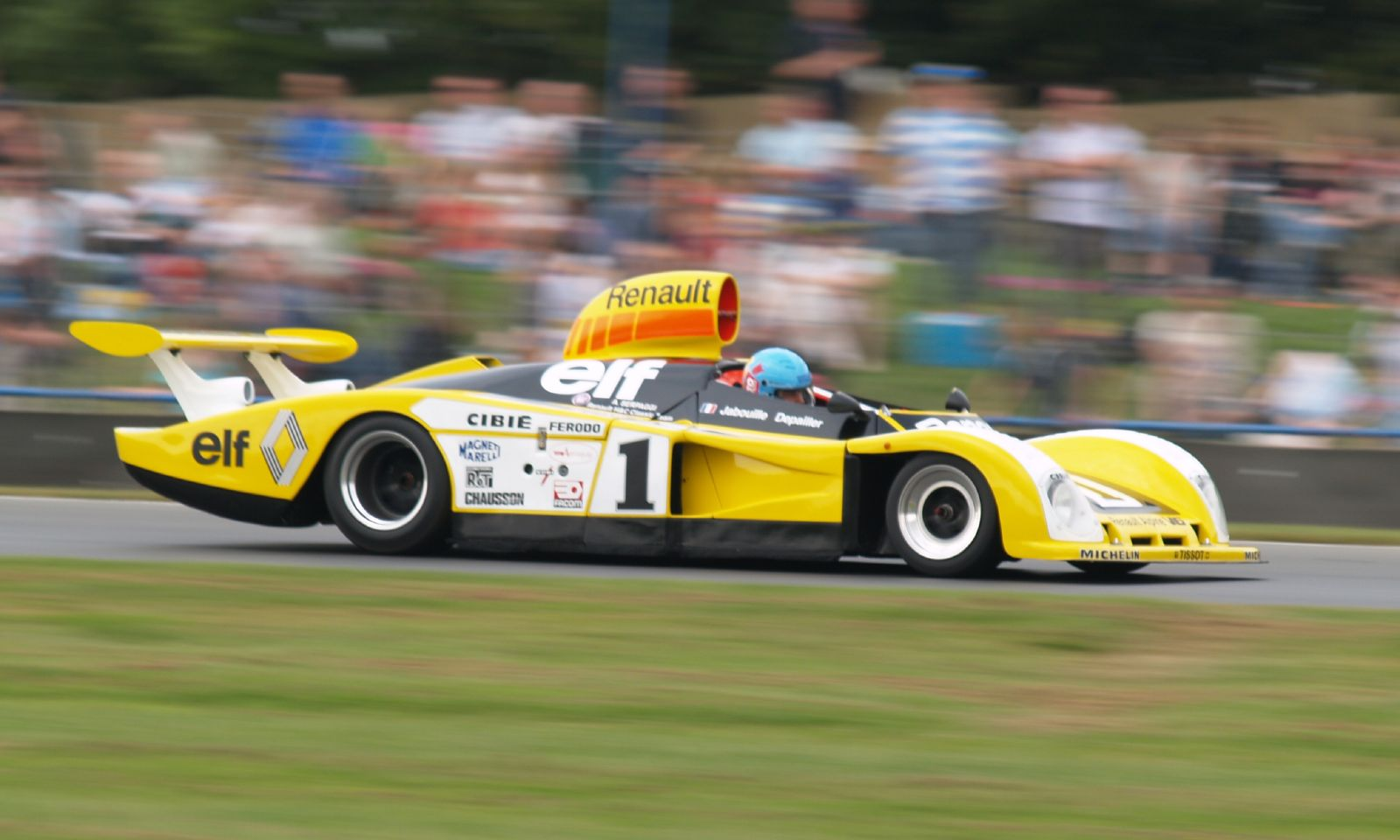
Renault Alpine A443 from 1978

In those years racing took a turn towards more extreme speeds and automotive designs. This contributed to the replacement of the typical standing Le Mans start with a rolling Indianapolis start. Purpose-built sportscars became the norm, with the traditional production-based cars now racing in lower classes. Porsche was dominant throughout the decade with their 917, 935, and 936 models. French manufacturers Matra-Simca and Renault also gained success, with the first victories for the nation since the 1950 race. Notably, 1978 saw the first win of a turbocharged engine with the Renault Alpine A443. The decade is also remembered for strong performances from many privateer constructors, with two scoring the only victories for a privateer in the decade. John Wyer's Mirage won in 1975, while Jean Rondeau's self-titled chassis took 1980.

=== 1981–1993 ===
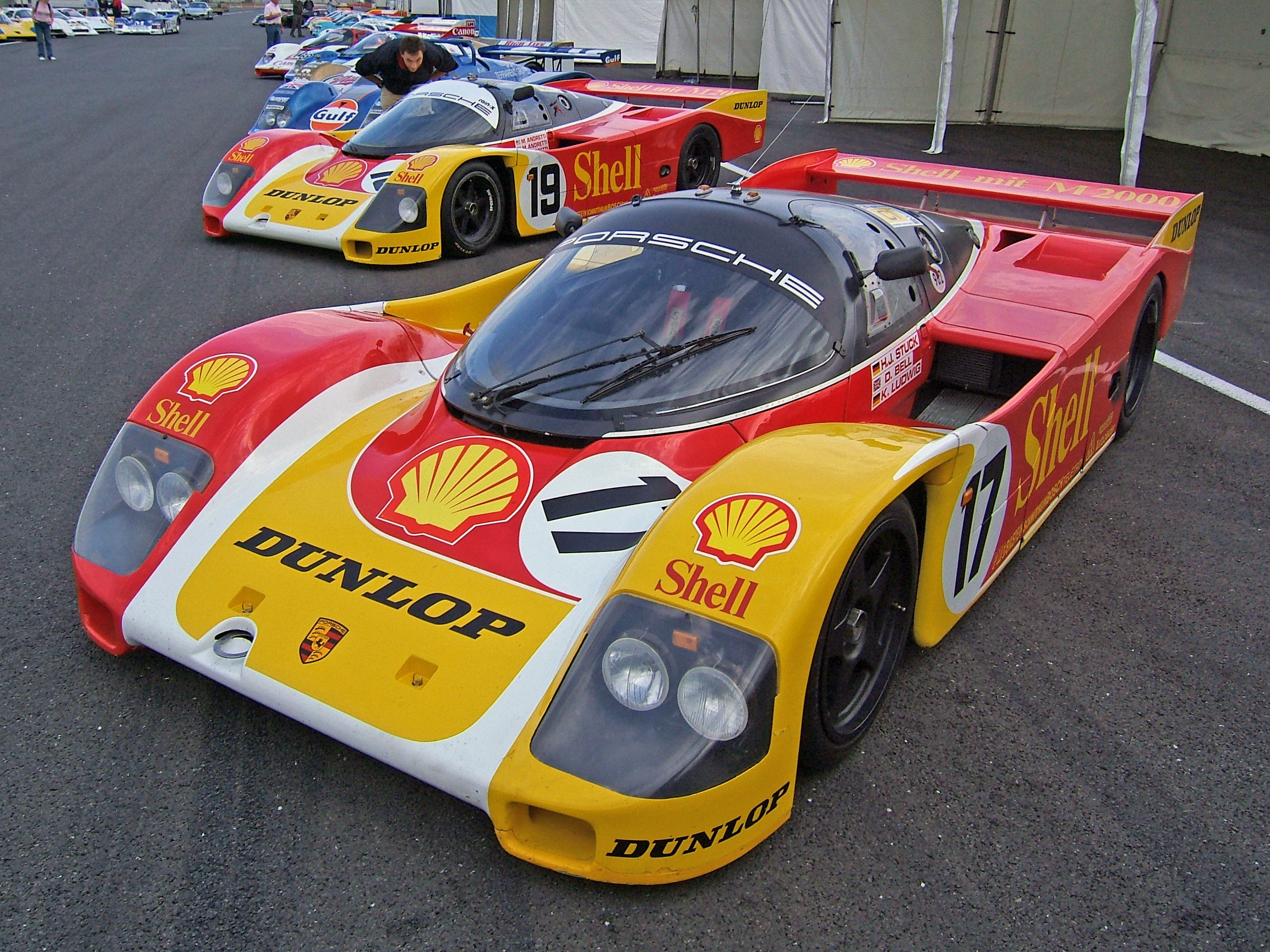
Group C Porsche 962 from 1988

The rest of the 1980s was known for the dominance by Porsche under the new Group C race car formula that encouraged fuel efficiency. Originally running the effective 956, it was later replaced by the 962. Both chassis were affordable enough for privateers to purchase them en masse, leading to the two model types winning six years in a row. Jaguar and Mercedes-Benz returned to sports car racing, with Jaguar being the first to break Porsche's dominance with victories in 1988 and 1990 (with the XJR-9 and Jaguar XJR-12 respectively). Mercedes-Benz won in 1989, with what was seen as the latest incarnation of the elegant "Silver Arrows", the Sauber C9, while an influx of Japanese manufacturer interest saw prototypes from Nissan and Toyota. In qualifying for the 1988 race, a WM Peugeot – built for speed, not meant to (and it did not) endure 24 hours – set the never surpassed speed trap record of 407 km/h (253 mph) (Note: Peugeot later restated this as 405 km/h, for marketing purposes, when it released an unrelated car branded the 405) in the Ligne Droite des Hunaudières, famous for its 6 km (3.7 mi) long straight. Mazda would be the first Japanese manufacturer to succeed, with their unique rotary-powered 787B winning in 1991.

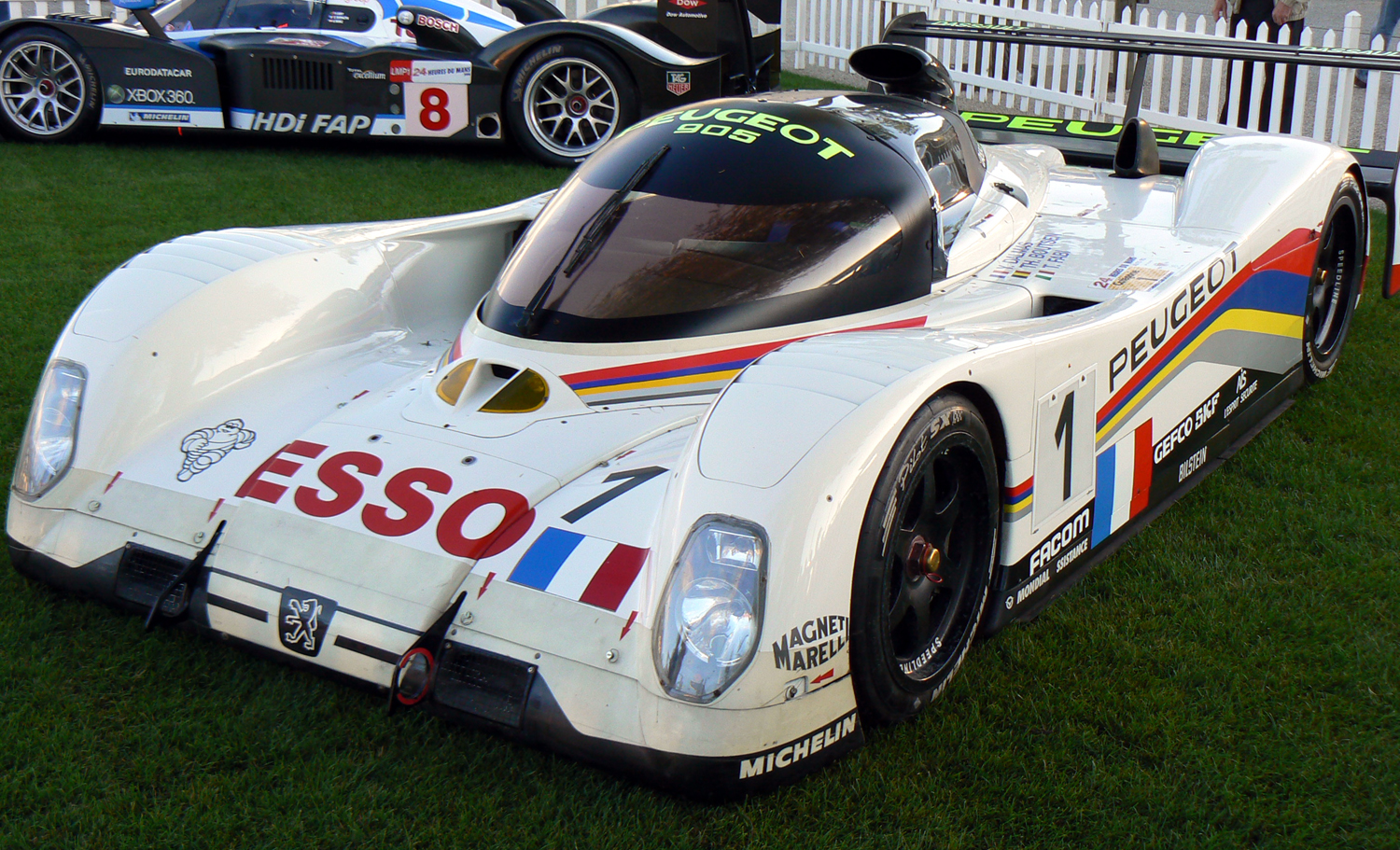
Peugeot 905 from 1993

In 1992 and 1993, Peugeot dominated the race with its Peugeot 905 as the Group C formula and World Sportscar Championship were fading in participation.

The circuit would also undergo one of its most notable changes in 1990, when the 5 km long Mulsanne was modified to include two chicanes in order to stop speeds of more than 400 km/h (250 mph) from being reached again. This began the ACO's trend to slow the cars on various portions of the track. However, speeds over 320 km/h (200 mph) are still regularly reached at various points on a lap.

=== 1994–1999 ===
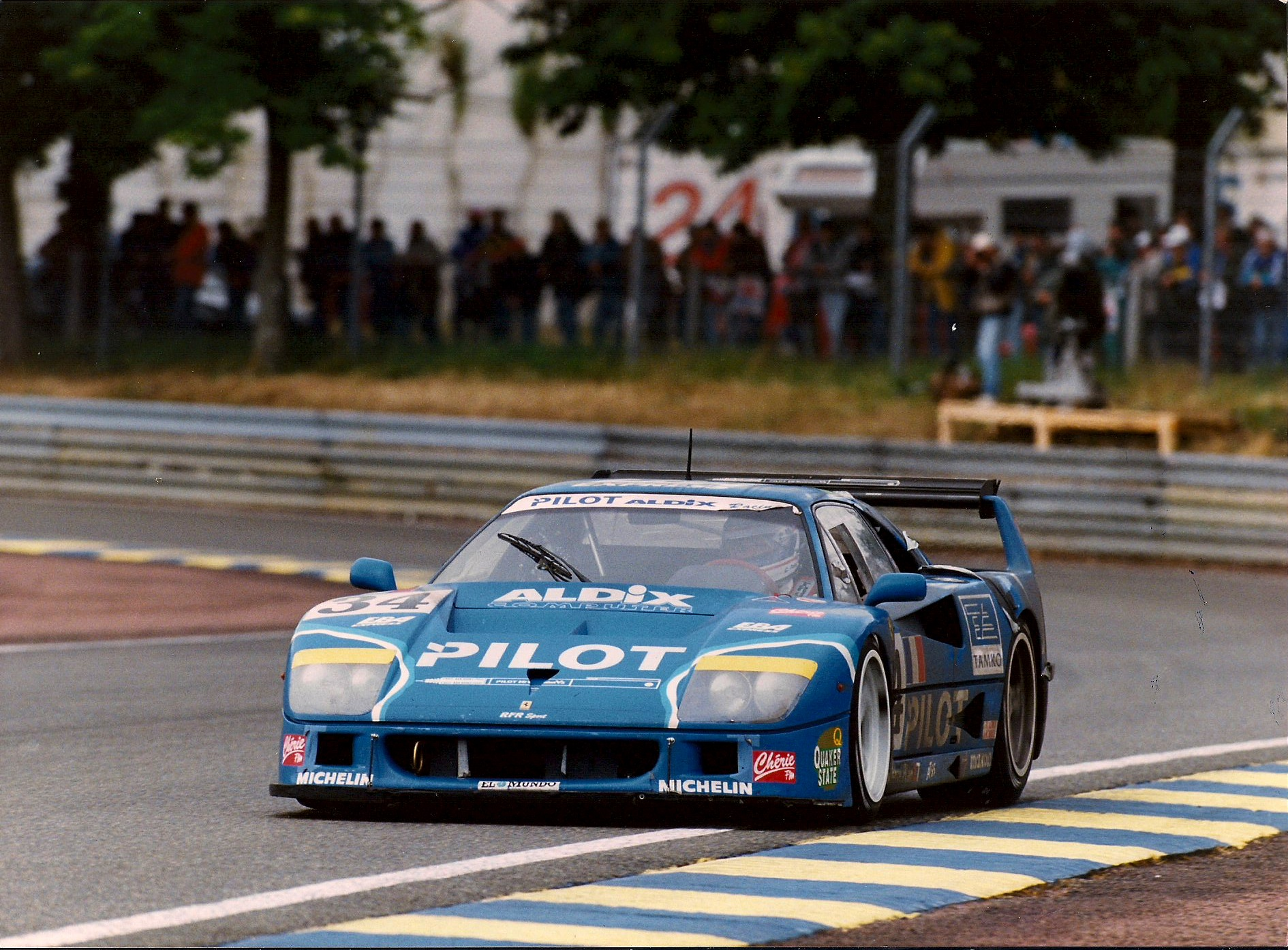
Ferrari F40 LM in 1995 race

Following the demise of the World Sportscar Championship, Le Mans saw a resurgence of production-based grand tourer cars. Thanks to a loophole in the rules, Porsche succeeded in convincing the ACO that a Dauer 962 Le Mans supercar was a production car, allowing Porsche to race their Porsche 962 for one final time, dominating the field. Although the ACO attempted to close the loophole for 1995, newcomer McLaren would win the race in their supercar's first appearance thanks to the reliability of the BMW V12 powered F1 GTR, beating faster yet more trouble-prone prototypes. The trend would continue through the 1990s as more exotic supercars were built in order to skirt the ACO's rules regarding production-based race cars, leading to Porsche, Mercedes-Benz, Toyota, Nissan, Panoz, and Lotus entering the GT categories. This culminated in the 1999 event, in which these GT cars were faced with the Le Mans Prototypes of BMW, Audi, Toyota and Ferrari. BMW would survive with the victory, their first and only overall Le Mans win to date. At the same time, Mercedes left sportscar racing indefinitely following three catastrophic though non-fatal crashes stemming from severe aerodynamic flaws with their CLR.

This strong manufacturer influence led the ACO to lend the Le Mans name to a sports car series in the United States in 1999, known as the American Le Mans Series, which ran until the end of the 2013 season after which it merged with Grand-Am to form the United SportsCar Championship.

=== 2000–2005 ===
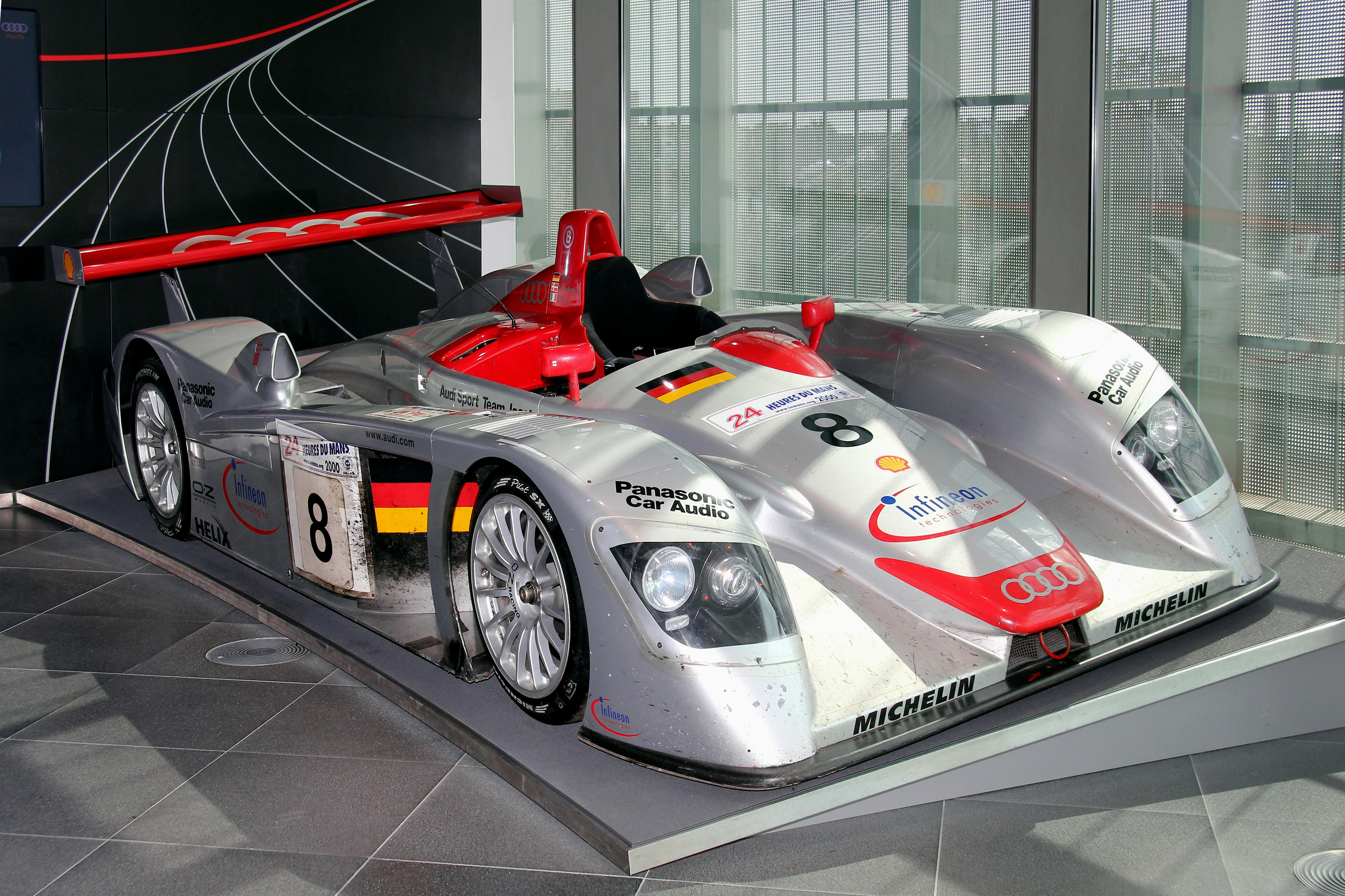
Audi R8

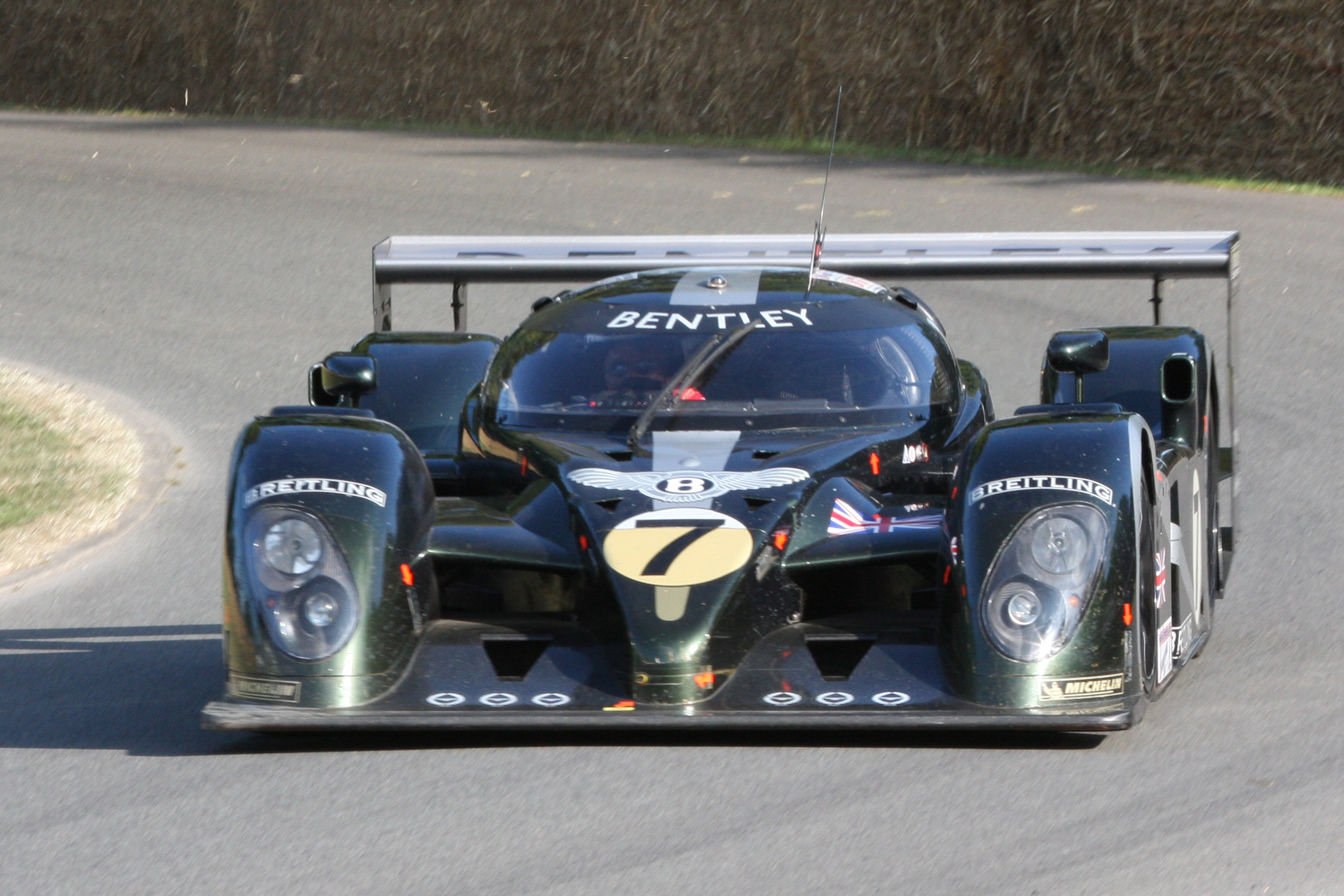
Bentley Speed 8

Many major automobile manufacturers withdrew from sports car racing after 1999 due to the high cost. Only Cadillac and Audi remained, and Audi easily dominated with the R8. Cadillac pulled out three years later, and attempts by Panoz, Chrysler, and MG to beat Audi all fell short. After three victories in a row, Audi provided engine, team staff, and drivers to Bentley, a corporate partner, which had returned in 2001. In 2003, the factory Bentley Speed 8s beat privateer Audis. The Chevrolet Corvette Racing Team and their C5-R won several times in the GTS class, finishing 1st and 2nd in 2001, 2002, and 2004. They finished 2nd and 3rd in 2003 behind Ferrari.

=== 2006–2013 ===
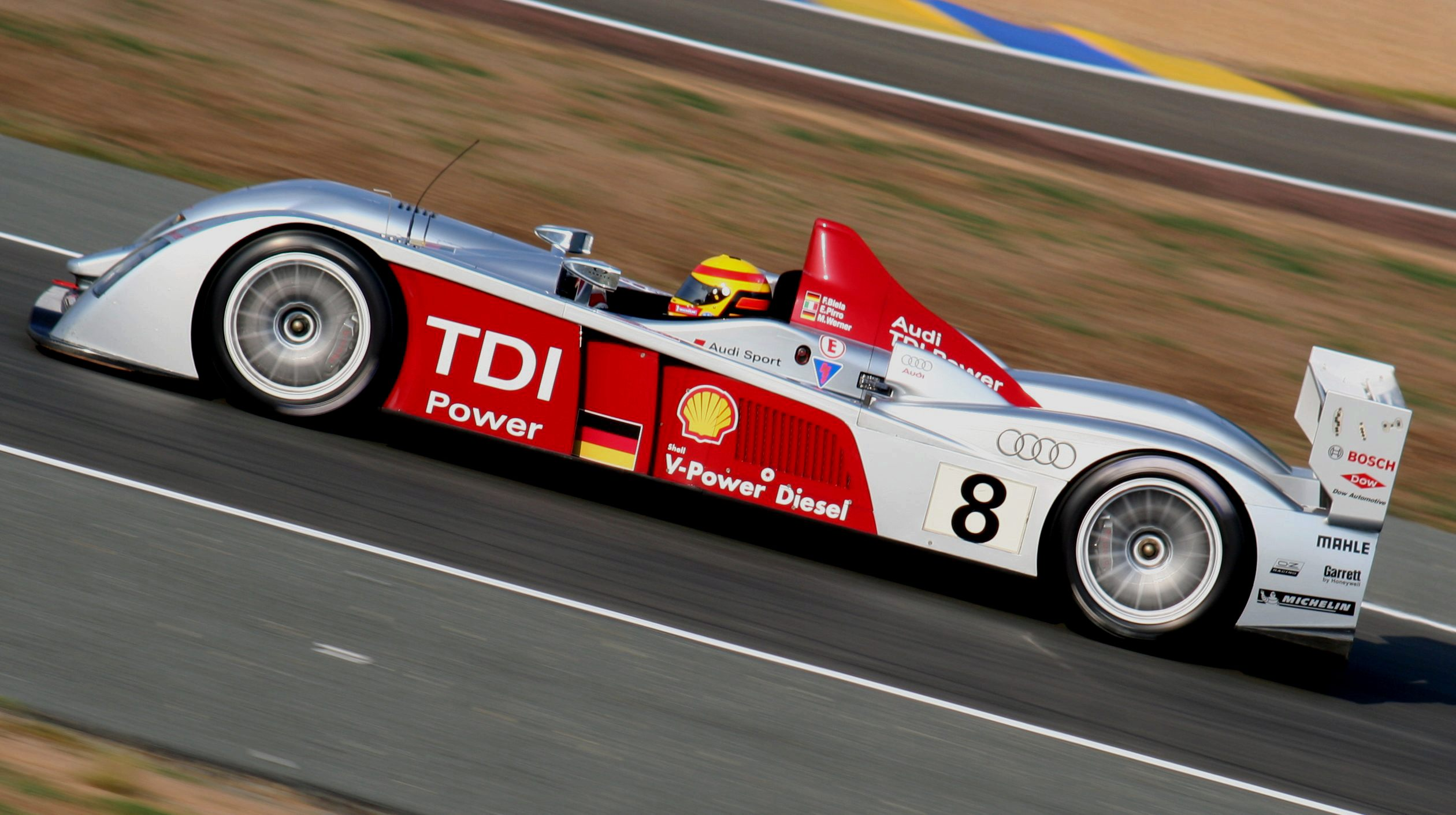
A diesel-powered Audi R10 TDI

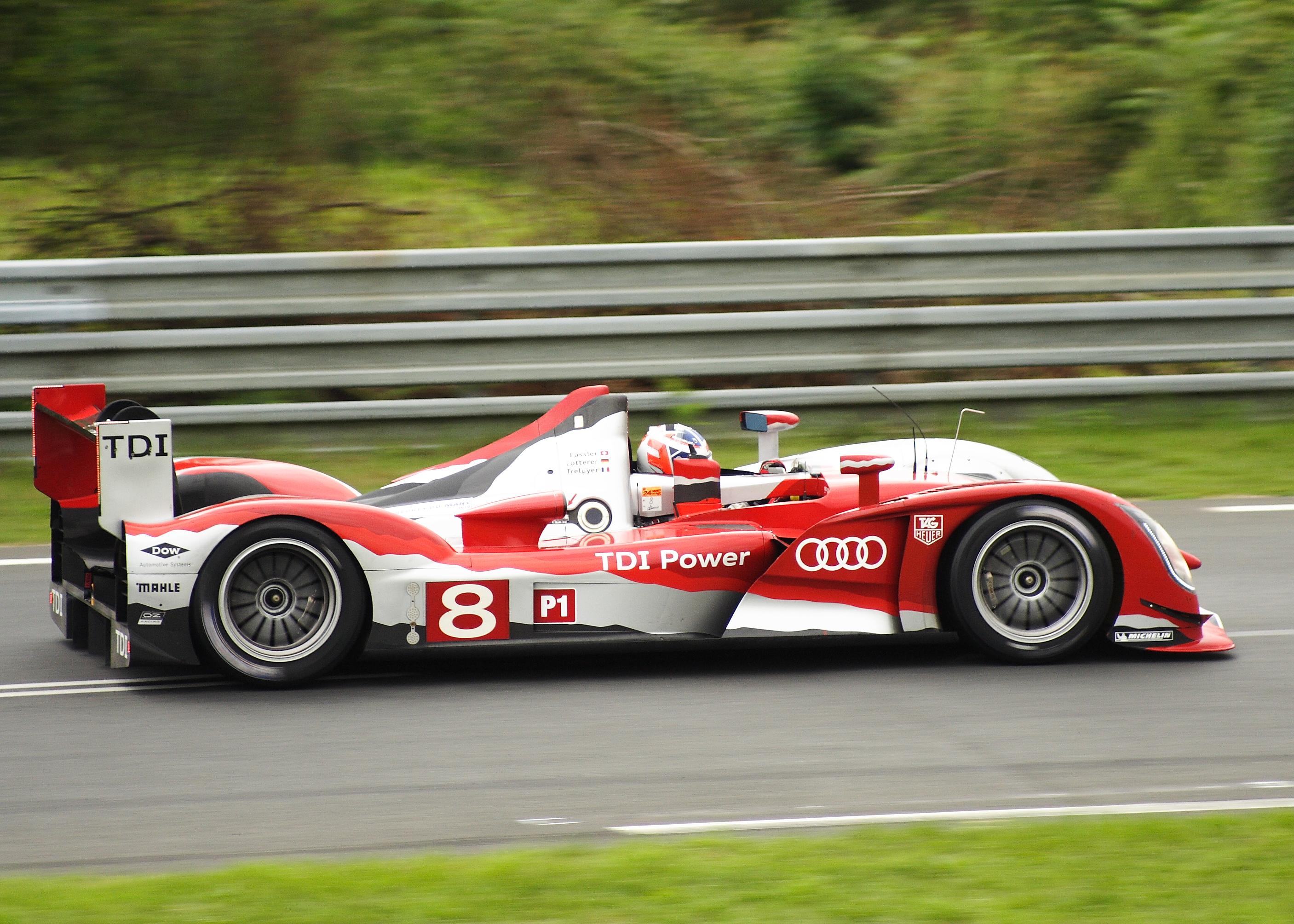
Audi R15 TDI

At the end of 2005, after five overall victories for the R8, and six to its V8 turbo engine, Audi took on a new challenge by introducing a diesel engined prototype known as the R10 TDI. Although not the first diesel to race, it was the first to win at Le Mans. This era saw other alternative fuel sources used, including bio-ethanol. At the same time, Peugeot decided to follow Audi's lead and pursue a diesel entry in 2007 with their 908 HDi FAP.

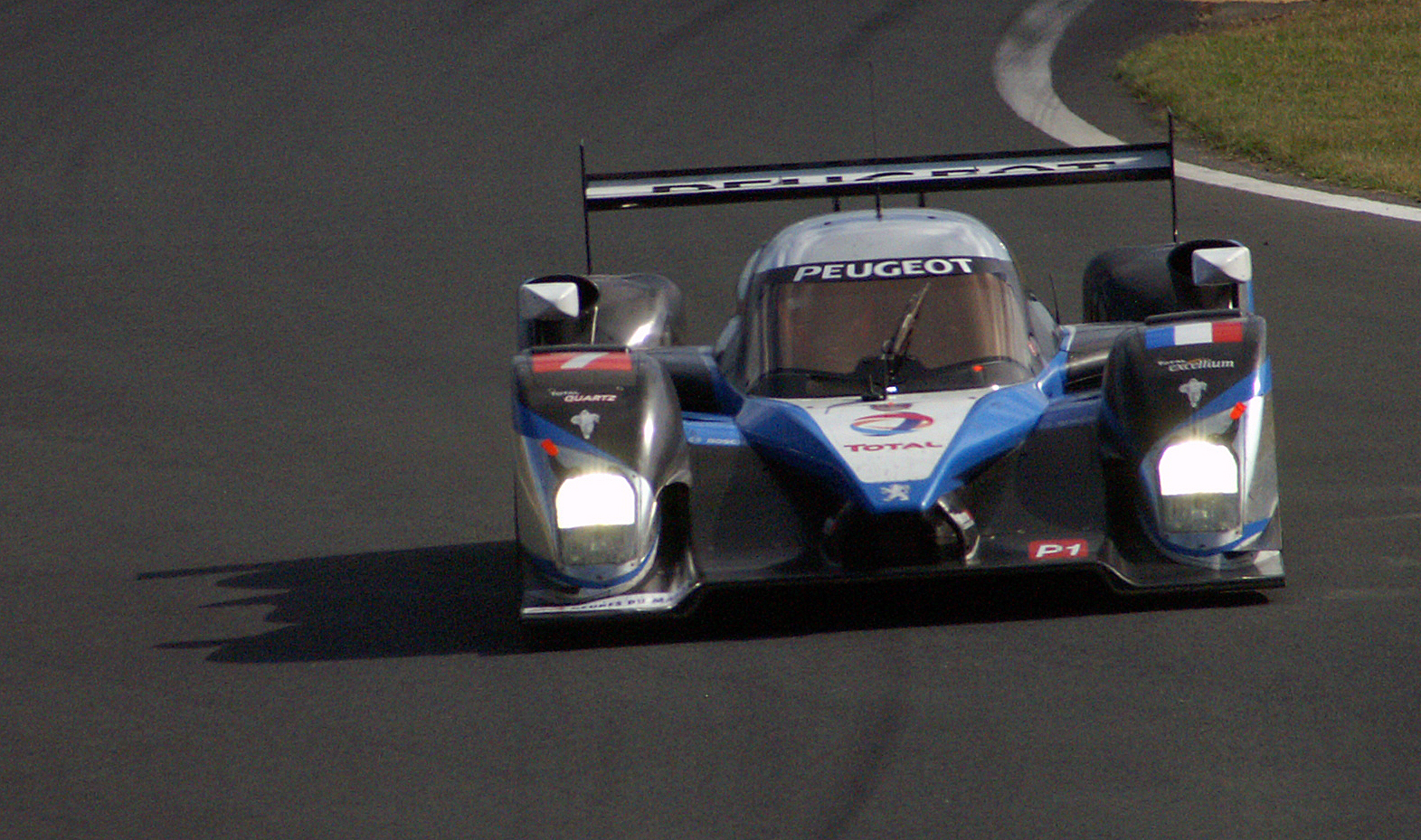
Peugeot 908 HDi FAP

In the 2008 race between the Audi R10 TDI and the Peugeot 908 HDi FAP, the Audi won by a margin of fewer than 10 minutes. For the 2009 24 Hours of Le Mans, Peugeot introduced a new energy-recovery system similar to the KERS used in Formula One. Aston Martin entered the LMP1 category, but still raced in GT1 with private teams. Audi returned with the new R15 TDI, but Peugeot prevailed in its first overall win since 1993.

The 2010 running reaffirmed the race as a test of endurance and reliability. Peugeot chose overall speed in adjusting their cars and engines to adhere to the 2010 regulations, while Audi chose reliability. All four Peugeots had retired at the end of the race, three due to engine failure, while Audi finished 1–2–3.

The 2011 and 2012 races were marred by a series of accidents. In 2011, the Audi driven by Allan McNish crashed heavily in the first hour, barrel rolling into a tire wall shortly after the Dunlop Bridge. At night, the defending race-winning Audi driven by Mike Rockenfeller crashed similarly between the Mulsanne and Indianapolis corners. Neither driver was seriously injured, nor were any spectators. The third Audi entry was driven by Marcel Fässler, André Lotterer, and Benoît Tréluyer won the race. The 2012 race saw two factory Toyotas replace Peugeot, which had withdrawn earlier, but one flipped at Mulsanne Corner. Driver Anthony Davidson suffered two broken vertebrae but could exit the car himself. Shortly after sunset, the other Toyota retired with mechanical difficulties, leading to another Audi victory.

In 2011, the race became the premier round of the Intercontinental Le Mans Cup, attempting to make a world championship for endurance racing again. In 2012, the race became the centerpiece of the FIA World Endurance Championship, the successor to the ILMC. The 2012 event was the first time the race was won by a hybrid electric vehicle, which was the Audi R18 e-tron quattro.

=== 2014–2020 ===
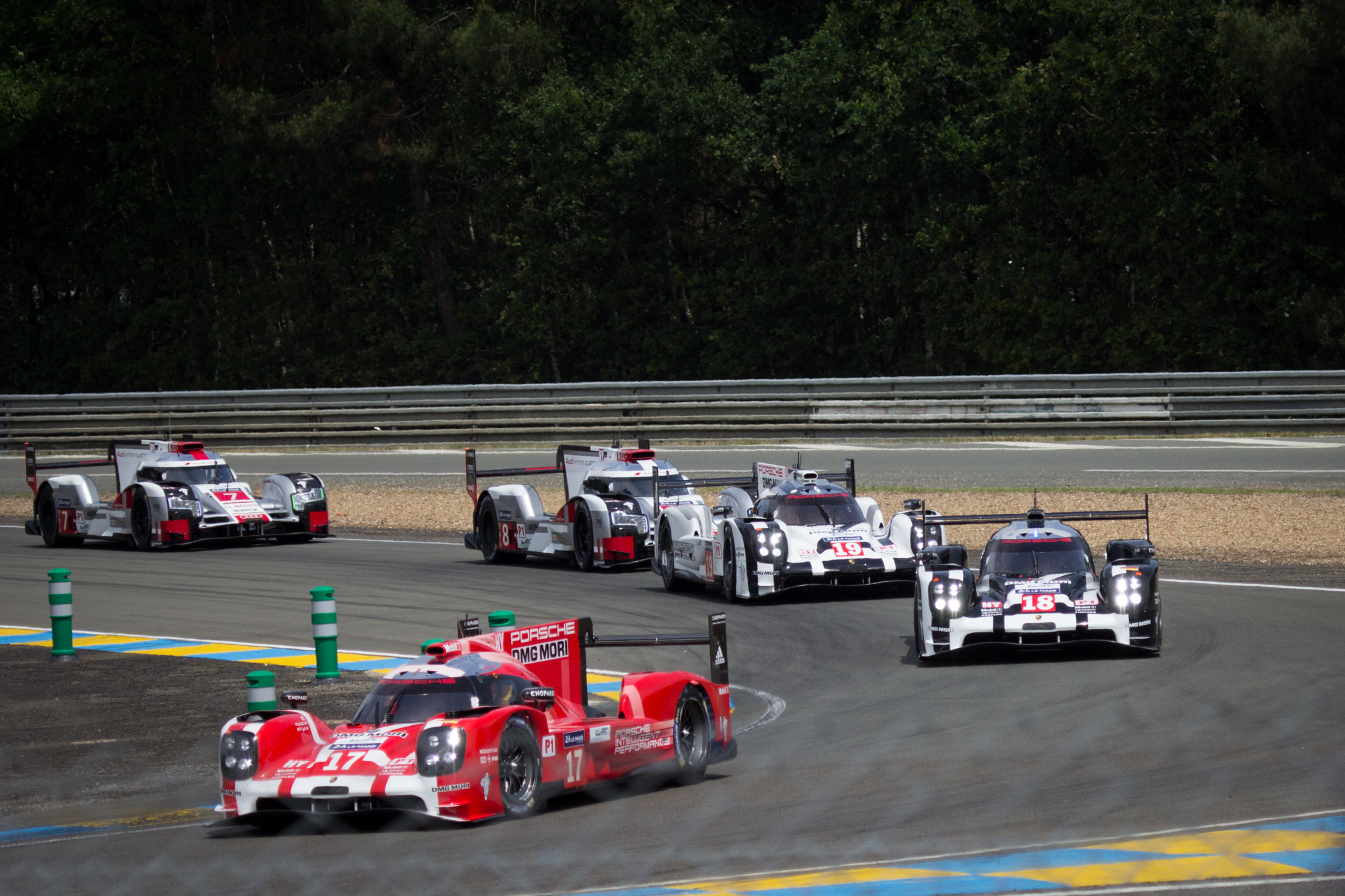
Porsche 919 Hybrid in the front of Audi R18 in 2015

Regulations were changed for 2014, notably with a requirement that all LMP1 cars must be closed-cockpit, some changes to the hybrid system, and the introduction of the slow zone system.

Porsche returned to Le Mans in 2014 with a new factory LMP1 program, and Nissan returned to run an LMP1 program in 2015. Audi withdrew from racing at the 24 Hours of Le Mans in 2016 and Nissan after only one attempt in 2015.

Porsche won the race in 2015, 2016, and 2017 with its hybrid 919, and remains the most successful manufacturer at Le Mans, with 19 overall victories.

In 2017, changes were made to the LMP2 regulations on cockpit and chassis, meaning all prototype cars must be closed-cockpit.

In 2018, Toyota won their first Le Mans with Fernando Alonso, Sébastien Buemi and Kazuki Nakajima driving. Toyota won the race again in 2019, 2020, 2021, and 2022.

2020 also saw the race held behind closed doors for the first time due to the COVID-19 pandemic.

=== 2021–present ===
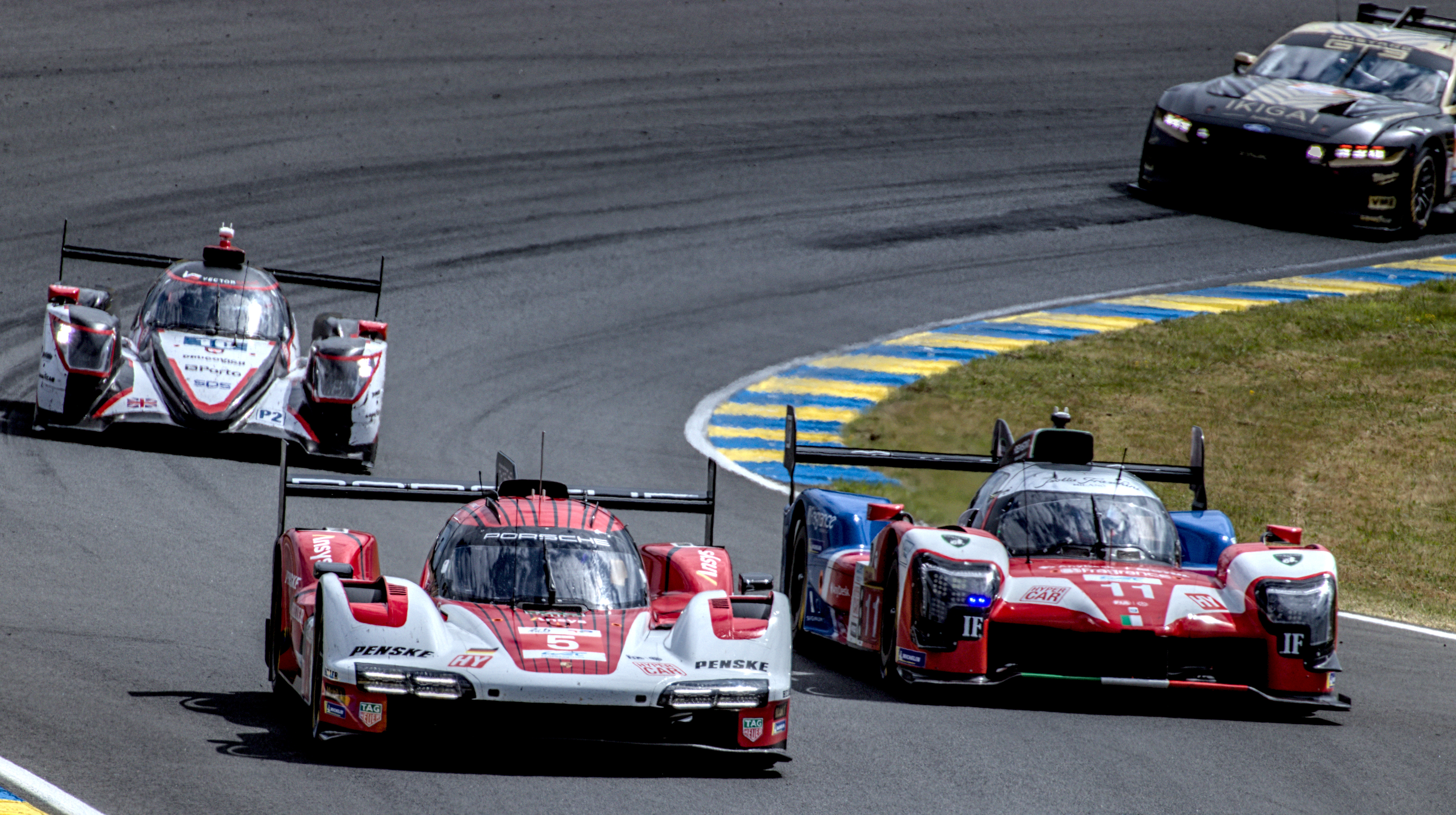
Porsche 963 in the front of Isotta Fraschini Tipo 6 LMH-C, followed by Oreca 07 and Ford Mustang GT3 in 2024

2021 saw the introduction of the Hypercar class, a class that allows for Le Mans Hypercars and from 2023 onwards also LMDh cars to participate. 2021 saw the race postponed once again, this time until August. For 2021 and 2022, non-hybrid LMP1 cars were allowed to participate as "grandfathered" LMP1 cars, although only Alpine would make use of this. Other entries in the hypercar class were Toyota and privateer team Glickenhaus. The new Hypercar regulations allowed manufacturers more freedom with the design, leading to cars such as the wingless Peugeot 9X8 entering in 2022, with other unique designs expected to be added. The LMP2 regulations were extended to 2027 with the next generation LMP2 cars to be introduced in 2028. 2028 will likely also see the introduction of hydrogen powered prototypes. The former LMGTE class was also replaced by LMGT3 in 2024.

== Innovations ==
Le Mans has seen many innovations in automotive design to counteract the circuit's difficulties. These have either been dictated by rules or have been attempts by manufacturers to outwit the competition. Some innovations were incorporated into the everyday automobile.

=== Aerodynamics ===
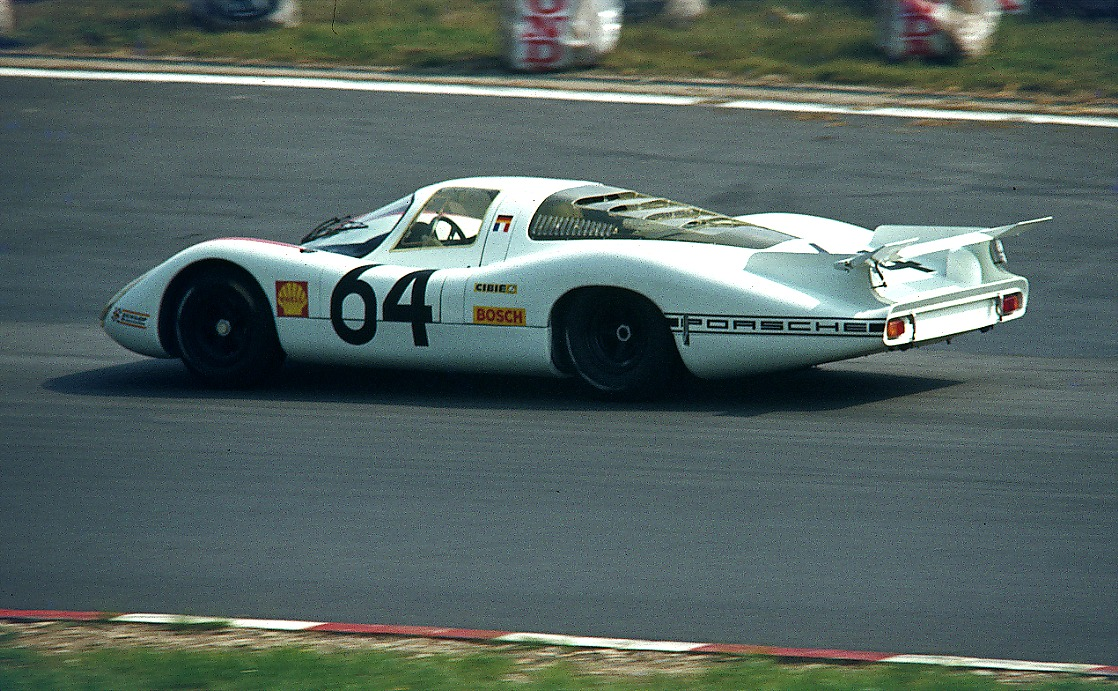
A 1969 Porsche 908 Langheck

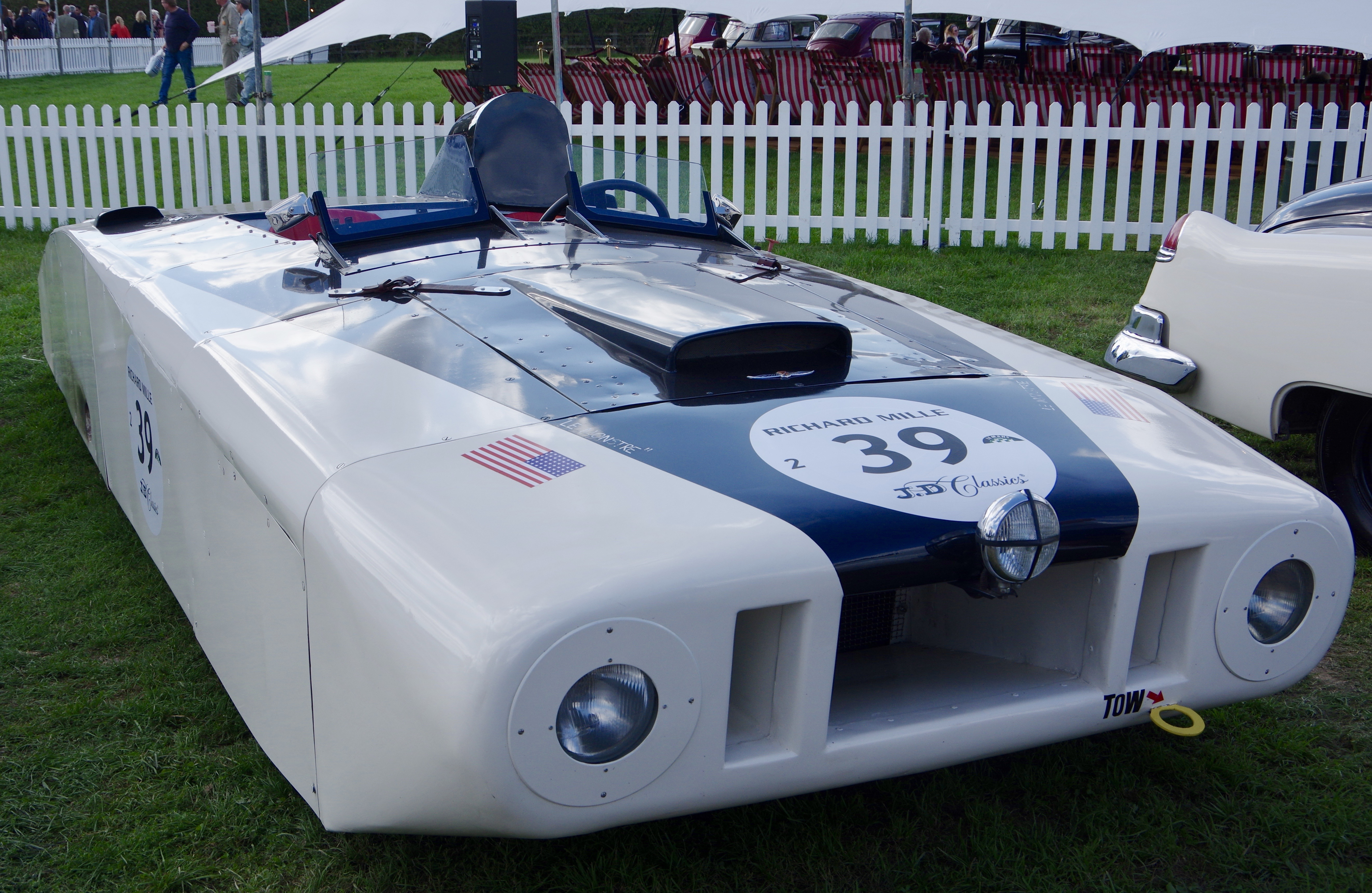
The 1950 Cadillac Le Monstre

One of the keys to Le Mans is top speed due to the long straights that dominate the circuit. This has meant cars have attempted to achieve the maximum speeds possible instead of relying on downforce for the turns. While early competitors' cars were street cars with their bodywork removed to reduce weight, innovators like Bugatti developed cars that saw the beginnings of aerodynamics. Nicknamed tanks due to their similarity to military tanks in World War I, these cars used simple curves to cover all the car's mechanical elements and increase top speed. Once Le Mans returned after World War II, most manufacturers would adopt closed bodies streamlined for better aerodynamics. A notable example of the changes brought about by aerodynamics are the 1950 entries by Briggs Cunningham. Cunningham entered two 1950 Cadillac Coupe de Villes, one nearly stock and the other completely rebodied in a streamlined aluminum shape developed by Grumman Aircraft Engineering Corporation that looked so unusual that it was nicknamed "Le Monstre" by the French press. The smoothing of body shapes and fairing-in of various parts of the machine brought about by the continual search for reduction of aerodynamic drag led to a separation from Grand Prix cars, which rarely had large bodywork.

As the years went on, bodywork became all-enveloping, while at the same time lighter. The larger bodywork with spoilers was able to provide more downforce for the turns without increasing the drag, allowing cars to maintain high speeds. Extended bodywork would usually concentrate on the car's rear, usually being termed long tail. The bodywork also began to cover the cockpit for less drag. However, open cockpits would come and go over the years as rules varied. Aerodynamics reached its peak in 1989 before the Mulsanne Straight was modified. During the 1988 race, the crew of a Peugeot powered WM prototype taped over the engine openings, allowing Roger Dorchy to set a recorded speed of 407 km/h (253 mph) down the Mulsanne. However, the car was almost undrivable elsewhere on the circuit. The engine was soon destroyed from a lack of cooling. However, for the 1989 event, the Mercedes-Benz C9 reached 400 km/h (249 mph) under qualifying conditions.

=== Engines ===
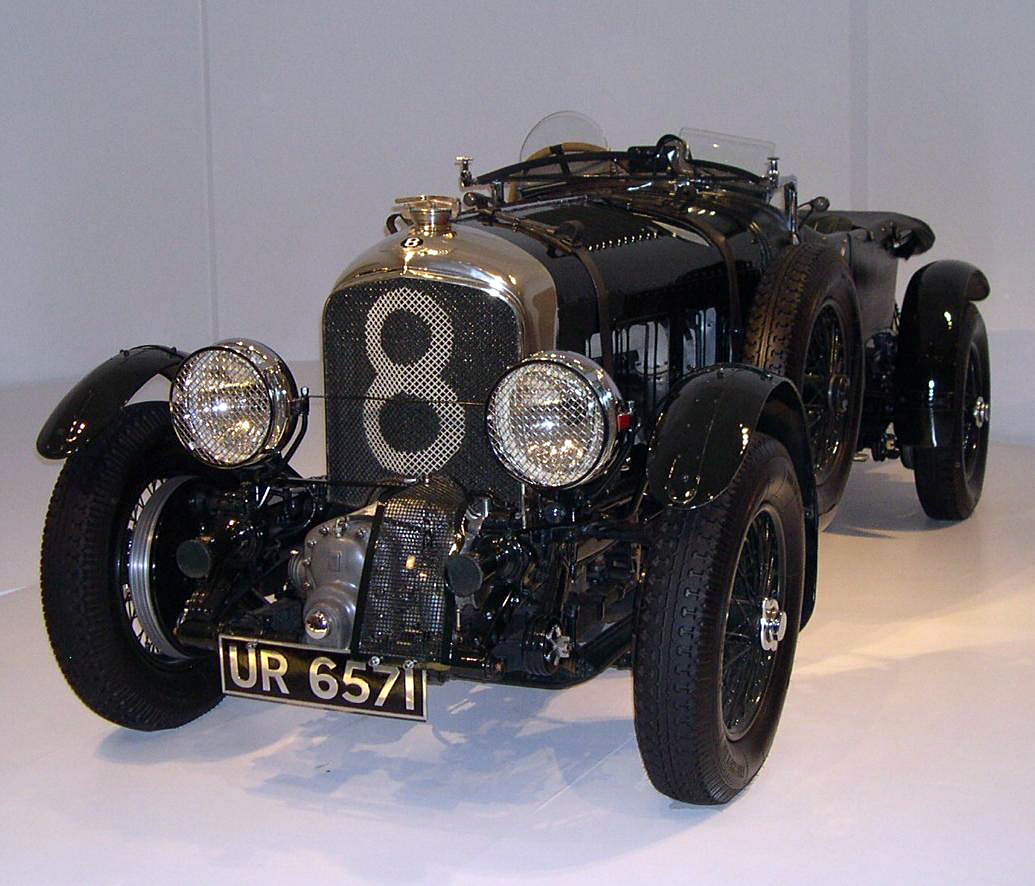
A 1929 supercharged Bentley

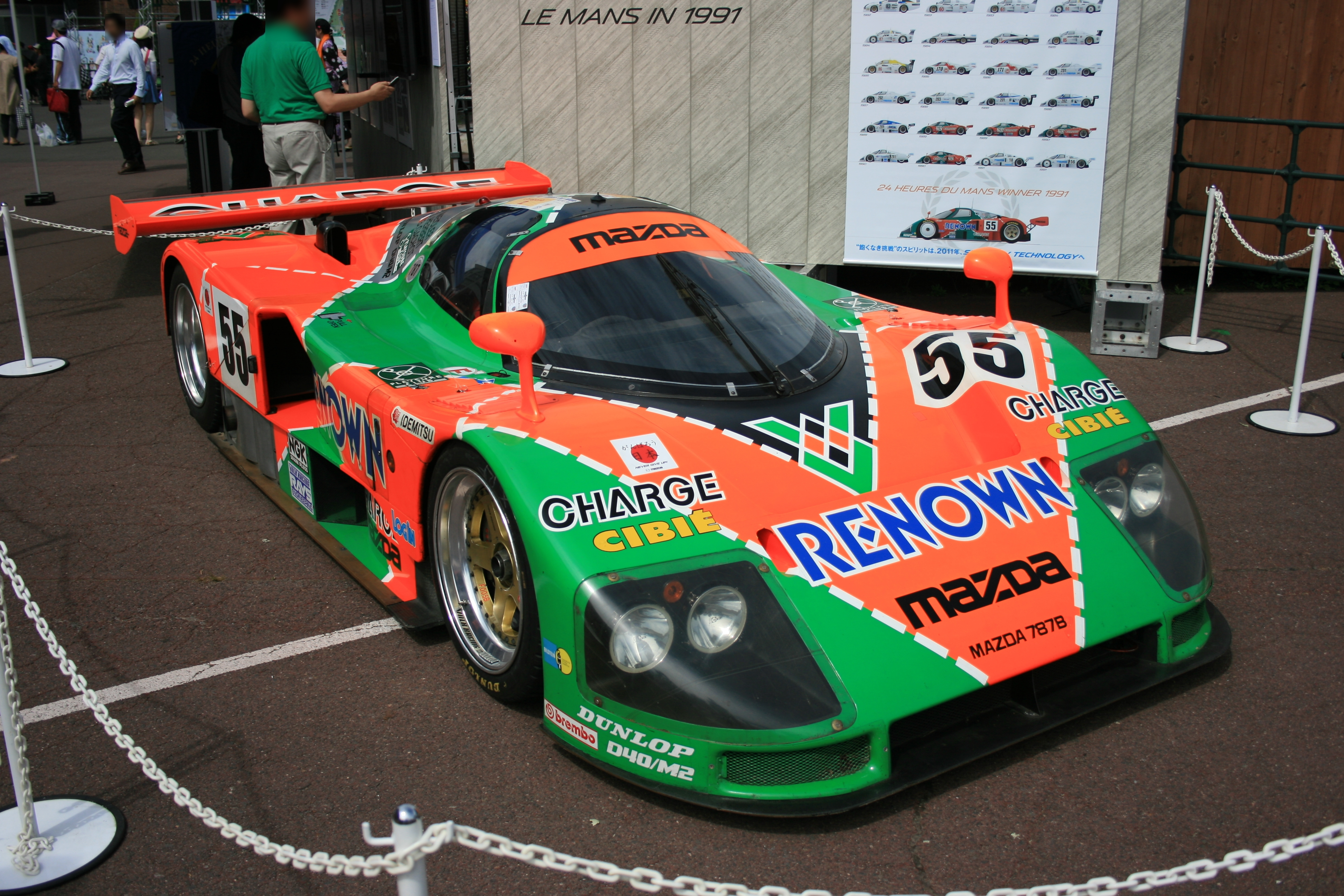
1991 Mazda 787B, the only Le Mans winner with a Wankel engine

A wide variety of engines have competed at Le Mans in attempts to achieve greater speed and fuel economy and to spend less time in the pits. Engine sizes have also varied greatly, with the smallest engines being a mere 569 cc (Simca Cinq) and the largest upwards of 8,000 cc (SRT Viper GTS-R). Supercharging was an early innovation for increasing output, first being raced in 1929, while turbocharging first appeared in 1974.

The first entry without a piston engine came in 1963, when Rover partnered with British Racing Motors to run a gas turbine car with mixed success, an effort they repeated in 1965. The American Howmet Corporation attempted to employ a turbine in 1968 with even less success: although the engines offered great power, they were hot and not fuel-efficient.

Another non-piston engine that appeared was the Wankel engine, otherwise known as the rotary engine. Used exclusively (in automotive applications) by Mazda since its introduction in 1970, the compact rotary engine suffered from fuel economy problems, yet eventually achieved the success that the turbines had not. After many years of development, Mazda finally became the only winner of the race not to have a piston-powered engine, as it took the 1991 event with the 787B.

Alternative fuel sources have also played a part in more normal engine designs, with the first non-gasoline car appearing in 1949. The Delettrez Special was powered by a diesel engine. In contrast, a second diesel appeared in the form of the M.A.P. the following year. Although diesel was used on several occasions, it was not until 2006 that a prominent manufacturer, Audi, invested in diesel; the company's R10 TDI was a success.

Ethanol fuel appeared in 1980 in a modified Porsche 911, leading to a class win. Alternative biological fuel sources returned again in 2004 with Team Nasamax's DM139-Judd. In 2008, biofuels (10% ethanol for petrol engines and biodiesel for diesel engines) were allowed. Audi was the first to use next-generation 10% BTL biodiesel developed by Shell and manufactured from biomass.

Beginning in 2009, new regulations allowed hybrid vehicles with either KERS or TERS (Kinetic/Thermal Energy Recovery System) setups. However, only electrical (i.e., battery) energy storage was allowed, ruling out flywheel-based energy recovery. Cars with KERS were allowed to race in 2009 under specific classification rules. Since 2010, they have competed for points and the championship. In 2012 the first KERS-equipped car won; the Audi R18 e-tron with a flywheel hybrid system by Williams Hybrid Power activated and drove the front wheels. This was only allowed in certain zones after the car had accelerated to at least 120 km/h to cancel out the acceleration advantage that all-wheel-drive cars could gain out of corners. In the same year, Toyota also started with a hybrid car, the TS030, which used KERS to power its rear wheels, meaning its usage was not restricted.

In 2025, the Automobile Club de l’Ouest is planning to introduce a hydrogen-electric prototype class. This class will be a one-design class with a chassis provided by Red Bull Advanced Technologies-Oreca and a powertrain supplied by GreenGT. The development of the hydrogen fuel cells powering the cars will be left to the teams themselves. According to the ACO's president Pierre Fillon, there is also a possibility of the cars being powered by a hydrogen combustion engine. The performance of the class is expected to be competitive with the top Hypercar class. Toyota unveiled new GR LH2 prototype for Gazoo Racing Europe.

=== Brakes ===
With increased speeds around the track, brakes become a key issue for teams attempting to safely bring their cars down to a slow enough speed to make the Mulsanne Corner turn. Disc brakes were first seen in 1953 when the Jaguar C-Type raced at Le Mans. In 1955 the Mercedes-Benz 300 SLR introduced the air brake using a large opening hood on the rear of the car. Ford used a quick change brake rotor in 1966 to achieve their first victory at Le Mans.

In the 1980s, anti-lock braking systems became standard on most Group C cars as a safety measure, making it less likely that cars lose control at high speeds. By the late 1990s, reinforced carbon-carbon brakes were adopted for better stopping power.

== Winners ==
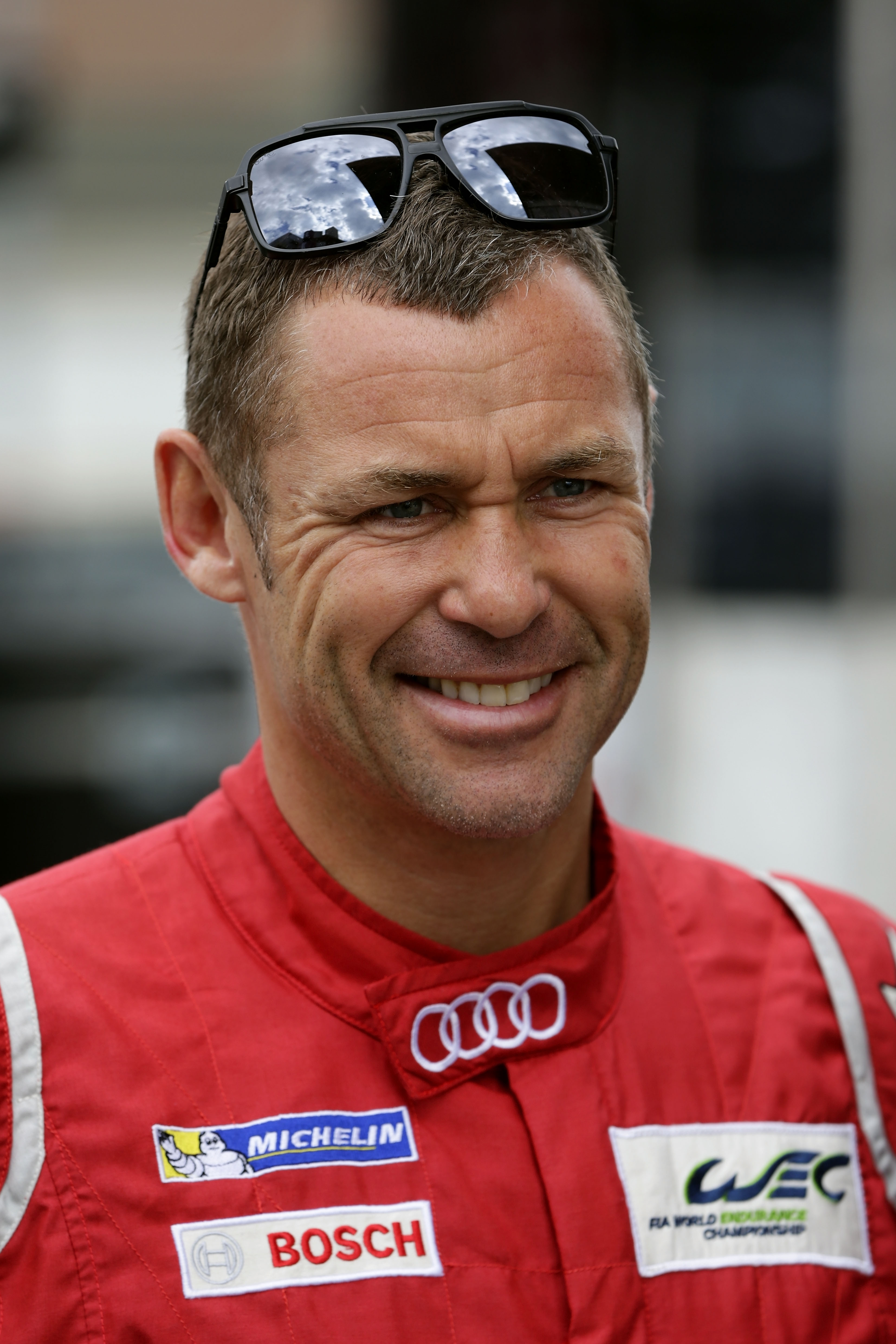
The most successful participant of all time at Le Mans, Danish driver Tom Kristensen, has nine wins (seven with Audi), the latest in 2013

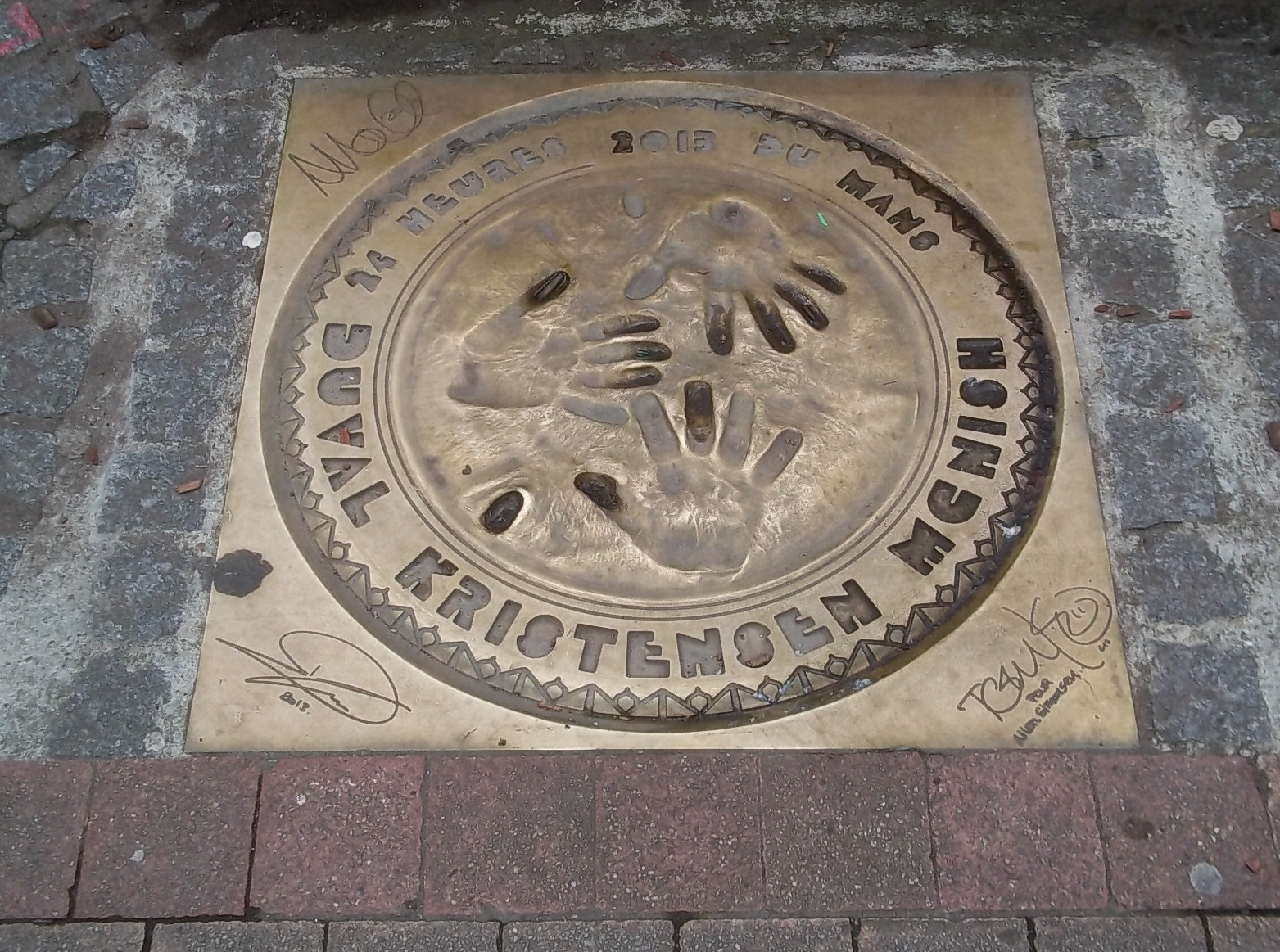
Tom Kristensen in the Walk of fame Le Mans-Winners 2013

Over the years, many manufacturers have managed to take the overall win, while even more have taken class wins. The most successful marque in the history of the race is Porsche, which has taken nineteen overall victories, including seven in a row from 1981 to 1987 and 107 class victories. Audi is next with thirteen wins, and Ferrari follows with eleven, also including six in a row from 1960 to 1965. Since 2000 Audi has dominated the event, winning 13 times in 15 years of participation. Audi and Team Joest have had two hat-tricks, the first being in 2000, 2001, and 2002. Jaguar has seven wins. In contrast, Toyota won five races in a row and Bentley, Alfa Romeo, and Ford all won four races in a row, with Bentley recording two additional victories in other years. In 2018, Toyota became only the second Japanese marque to win, following Mazda in 1991. Mazda is also the only company to win with a rotary engine. After Porsche's total of 107 class victories, Ferrari has 37, and Aston Martin, Audi, and Chevrolet each have 14.

Three drivers stand apart for their number of victories. Initially, Jacky Ickx held the record at six, scoring victories between 1969 and 1982, earning him honorary citizenship to the town of Le Mans. His frequent racing partner, Derek Bell, trailing by a single win, with five. However, Tom Kristensen has beaten this record with nine wins between 1997 and 2013, including six in a row. Three-time winner Woolf Barnato (1928 to 1930), Tazio Nuvolari (1933), Luis Fontés (1935), American racing legend A. J. Foyt (1967), Nico Hülkenberg (2015), and Fernando Alonso (2018–2019) are the only drivers to have won every Le Mans in which they participated.

Henri Pescarolo won the race four times, and holds the record for the most Le Mans appearances at 33. Japan's Yojiro Terada was active as a driver until 2008, and holds the record for the most Le Mans starts without an overall win. Claude Ballot-Léna holds the most class victories other than Kristensen with seven wins in GT class cars between 1970 and 1986. Graham Hill is the only driver to win the so-called Triple Crown of Motorsport, winning the Indianapolis 500 (1966), Monaco Grand Prix (1963, 1964, 1965, 1968, 1969), and the 24 Hours of Le Mans (1972).

== Accidents ==
Le Mans has seen many fatal accidents due partly to the very high-speed nature of all variants of the track throughout history. The largest one was in 1955 when at least 81 spectators (exact number unknown, many sources estimate 83) and driver Pierre Levegh were killed. In the wake of the disaster, many races were cancelled, including the Grand Prix races in Germany, Spain, France and Switzerland (the latter as a part of a blanket ban on motorsport round-track races that was maintained until 2022). The accident led to safety regulations in all motorsports for both driver and spectator protection.

Almost all decades in which Le Mans has been run have seen many horrific accidents, such as in 1972 when Jo Bonnier was catapulted into a forest surrounding the circuit after hitting a privately entered Ferrari near the Indianapolis section; Bonnier was killed instantly. The 1980s was a decade where some of the race's worst-ever accidents occurred. Although Armco barriers had been installed along the straight in 1969, there were still no chicanes on the Mulsanne Straight. It was here that almost all of the worst accidents occurred during that time. The prototypes, most of which were equipped with powerful turbocharged engines, were capable of doing more than 390–400 km/h (240–250 mph) before reaching the kink and would still be doing the same kind of speeds at the end of the 5.8-kilometre (3.6 mi) straight – and even through the kink, which was a flat-out bend for all the cars on the track. In 1981, Belgian Thierry Boutsen crashed on the Mulsanne Straight in his WM-Peugeot, killing a marshal. In the same race, Frenchman Jean-Louis Lafosse was also killed on the Mulsanne Straight when his Rondeau suffered a suspension failure, steered very suddenly to the right, and slammed into the Armco barrier on the driver's side at extreme speeds. The 1984 race saw British privateer John Sheldon crashing at more than 320 km/h (200 mph) at the Mulsanne Kink; his Aston Martin V8 powered Nimrod tore through the Armco barriers into the trees. The resulting explosion was so violent that the woods next to the track caught fire. Although Sheldon survived with severe burns, a track marshal was killed; two others were also severely injured. Sheldon's teammate, American Drake Olson in the second Nimrod-Aston Martin, who was following him down the straight, crashed heavily after running over Sheldon's bodywork; he went into severe shock but survived with minor injuries. The field was under the safety car for over an hour while the crash site was cleared, and the destroyed Armco barriers were replaced.

In 1985, a similar accident befell Briton Dudley Wood in a Porsche 962 during practice. The impact of the car against the Armco, considering Wood was doing more than 370 km/h (230 mph), was so hard that it cracked the engine block. Wood survived without injury. In 1985, John Nielsen flipped his Sauber-Mercedes while going over the Mulsanne hump at more than 350 km/h (220 mph). The car landed on its roof and was destroyed, but Nielsen escaped without injury. In 1986, Jo Gartner drove a Porsche 962C into the Mulsanne barriers and was killed instantly after the car rolled multiple times, vaulted some Armco barriers, and knocked down a telegraph pole. Moreover, in 1987, American Price Cobb crashed a works Porsche 962C after slipping on oil during Wednesday practice. The fuel tank exploded and the car burned to the ground, but Cobb escaped without injury.

Gartner's fatal accident remained the most recent death in the race until Allan Simonsen's crash in 2013. However, there was one fatality during a practice session in 1997 (Sebastien Enjolras).

In 1999, the Mercedes-Benz CLRs suffered from aerodynamic instability leading to cars getting airborne and flipping backwards, no less than three times. After initially happening on Thursday to the #4 car, Mercedes rebuilt the chassis on Friday and claimed to have solved the problem, only for it to occur again at warmup on Saturday. Mark Webber was the unlucky driver whose car flipped on both occasions. The last and most damaging accident occurred during the race itself when Peter Dumbreck's CLR #5 became airborne, flying over the safety fencing and landing in the woods several metres away. No drivers were severely hurt in any of the three accidents. However, Mercedes-Benz withdrew its remaining entry and ended its entire sportscar programme to focus on F1 and the upcoming new DTM.

In 2011, two horrific accidents occurred to two of the three factory Audis in the LMP1 class. Near the end of the first hour, the No. 3 car driven by Allan McNish collided with one of the Ferrari GT cars, resulting in McNish's car smashing into the tyre wall and being thrown into the air at the Dunlop chicanes, resulting in pieces of bodywork flying over and nearly hitting many photographers on the other side of the barrier. In the eleventh hour of the race, another accident occurred to the No. 1 car driven by Mike Rockenfeller when he had contact with another Ferrari GT car. In the runup to Indianapolis corner, Rockenfeller's Audi was sent into the outside barrier at over 270 km/h (170 mph). Only the main cockpit safety cell of the car remained, along with major damage being done to the barriers that needed to be repaired before the race was resumed. Audi had switched to a closed-cockpit car starting in 2011, a decision credited for the fact that neither driver was injured. The 2014 regulations required all cars to be closed-cockpit due to the 2011 accident.

In 2012, Anthony Davidson, driving for the returning Toyota team in a Toyota TS030 Hybrid, collided with a Ferrari 458 GT2 of Piergiuseppe Perazzini, and became airborne before crashing into the tyre barrier of the Mulsanne Corner at high speed. The Ferrari also ended up in the barrier, flipping and coming to a halt on its roof. Davidson suffered broken vertebrae.

In 2013, Allan Simonsen died after crashing into the barriers at Tertre Rouge. When the car collided with the guard rail, a mature tree had been touching the barrier, thereby preventing the guard rail from performing its safety function.

== Coverage ==
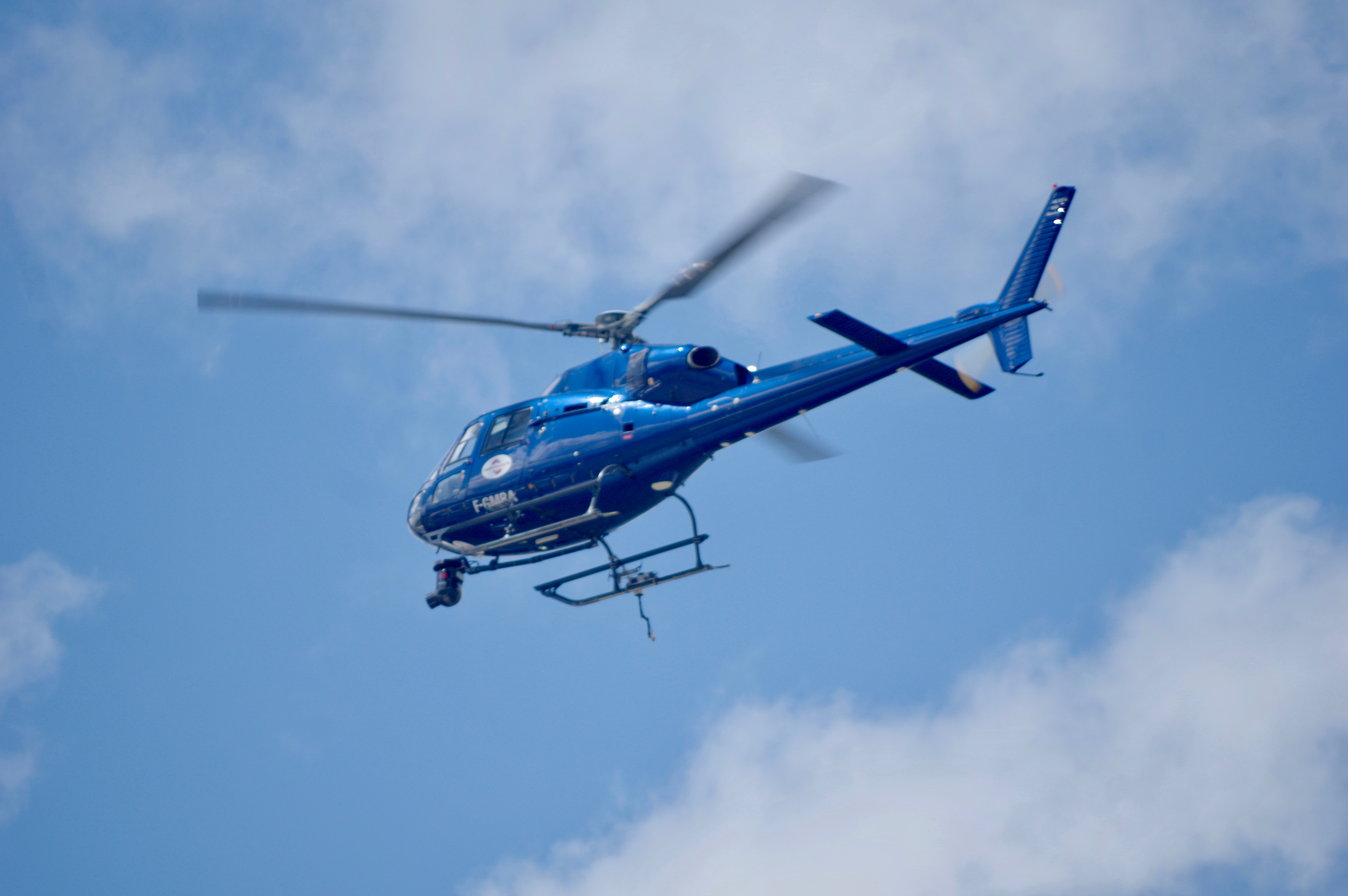
A helicopter that provided aerial coverage for the 2019 race

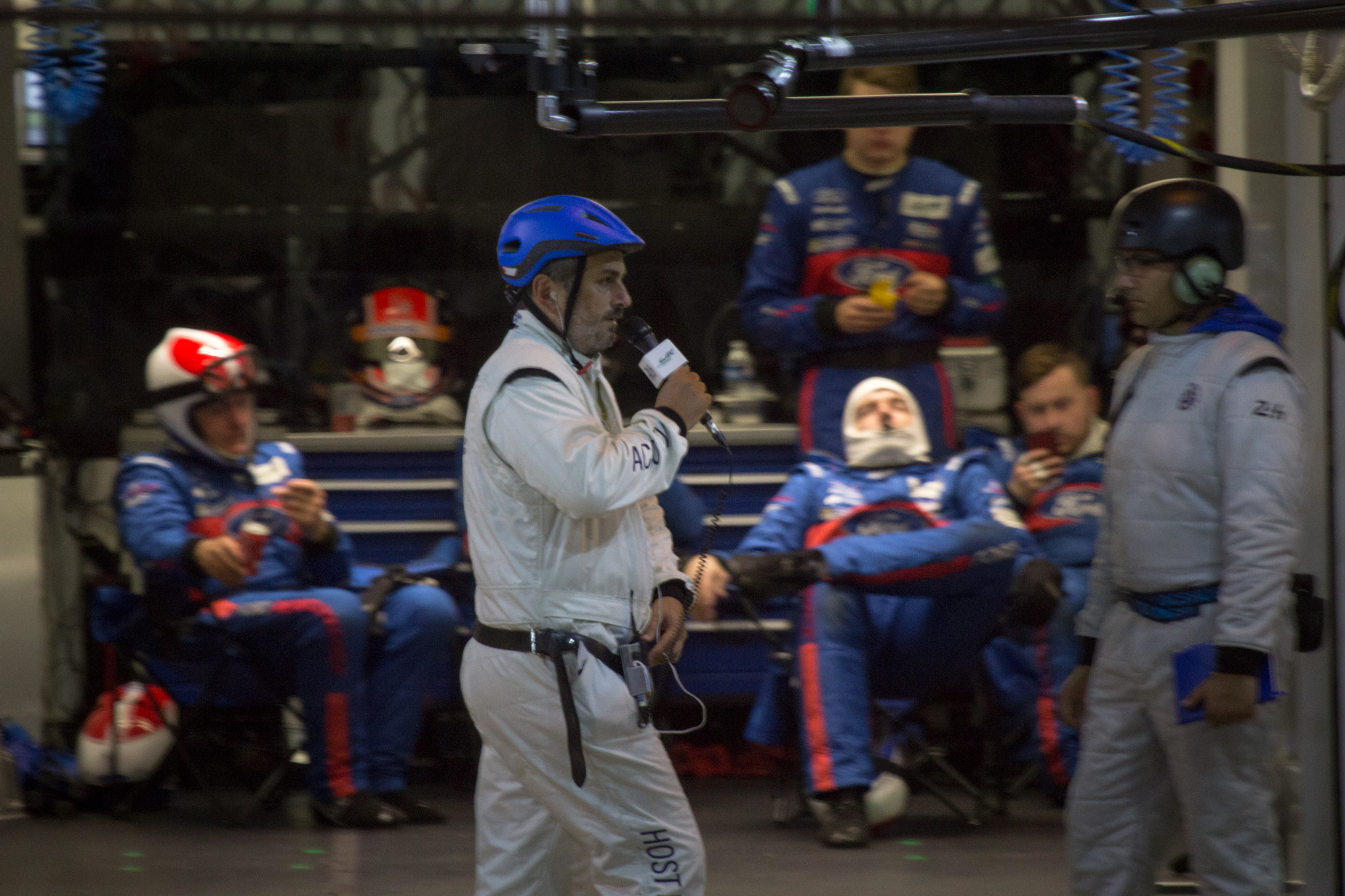
An ACO host covering the 2016 race

Motors TV covered the Le Mans 24 Hours in its entirety in 2006 and 2007, including coverage of the scrutineering, qualifying, driver parade, warmup, and race. In the United States, FOX owned SPEED Channel, followed by Fox Sports 1 and Fox Sports 2 aired complete race coverage live either on-air or online through a combination of coverage from the French host broadcaster and its own pit reporting crew for several years. That deal ended after the 2017 season. A United States television deal was not done for the 2018–19 WEC Super Season because of a renegotiation of its European contract.

In 2008, Eurosport secured a multi-year deal to show the entire race, including the qualifying and the motorcycle race. Every hour of the 2008 race was broadcast in segments on the main channel and Eurosport 2. However, a couple of hours were missed in recent years due to scheduling clashes with other sporting events. In addition, Eurosport provided live streaming on its website to subscribers. Since 2009, Eurosport and Eurosport 2 have covered all the action, and beginning in 2018, Eurosport gained United States broadcast rights for the World Endurance Championship for the race only on Motor Trend, a channel also owned by Eurosport's parent company. Qualifying and practices aired on a direct-to-consumer streaming platform from Motor Trend magazine. In Australia in 2012, Ten Sport showed the race live and in full online.

The race is also broadcast (in English) on the radio by Radio Le Mans.

== Vintage racing ==
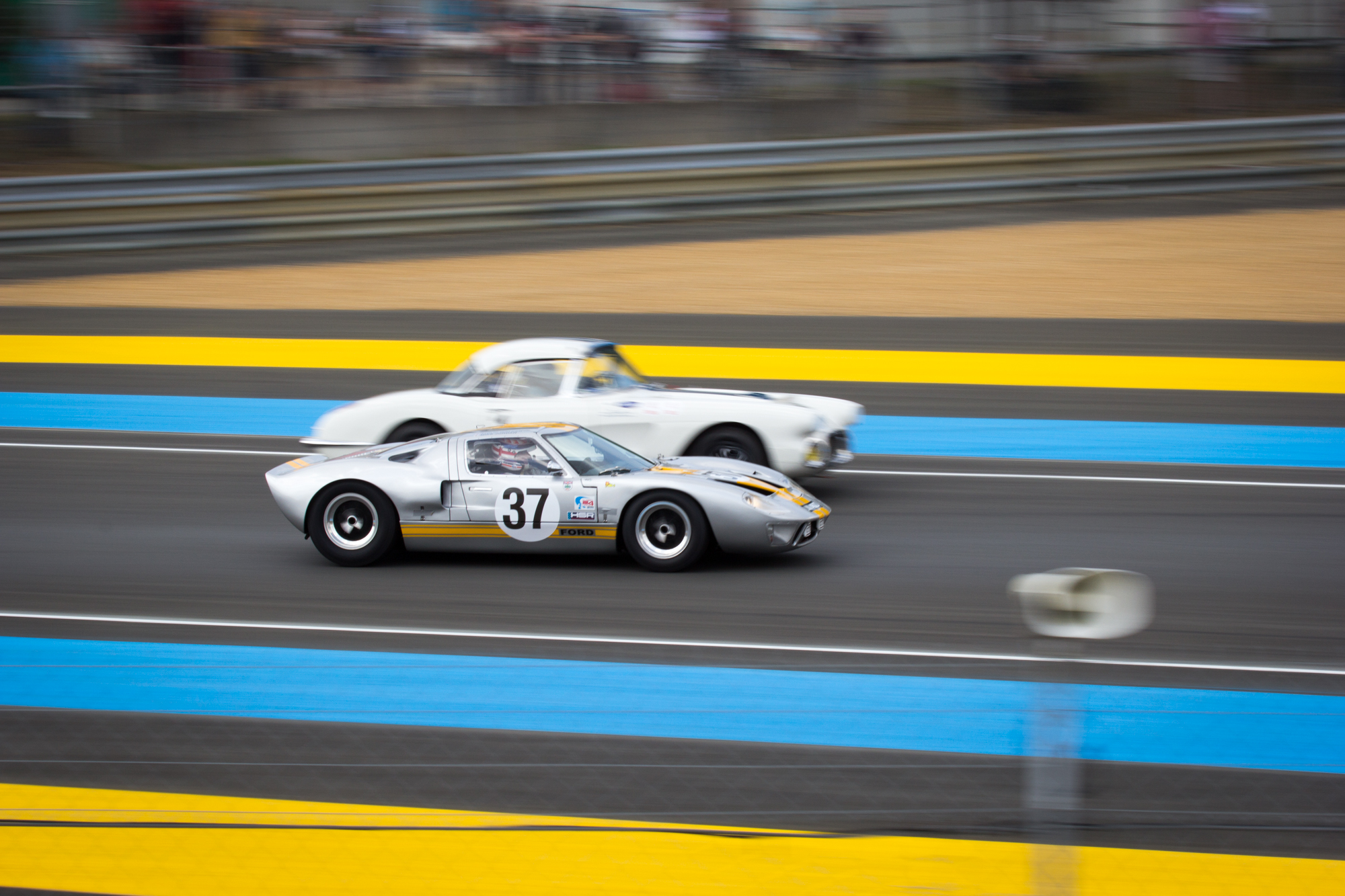
Ford GT40 alongside Chevrolet Corvette in 2015 Le Mans Legend

Since 2001, the ACO has allowed the "Le Mans Legend" event to participate on the full Circuit de la Sarthe. These exhibition races involve classic cars that had previously run at Le Mans or are similar to those. Each year, a particular era of cars may participate, with the featured era changing from year to year. Though most drivers in this event are amateurs, some noted professional drivers have appeared to race cars they had previously run, such as Stirling Moss and Derek Bell.

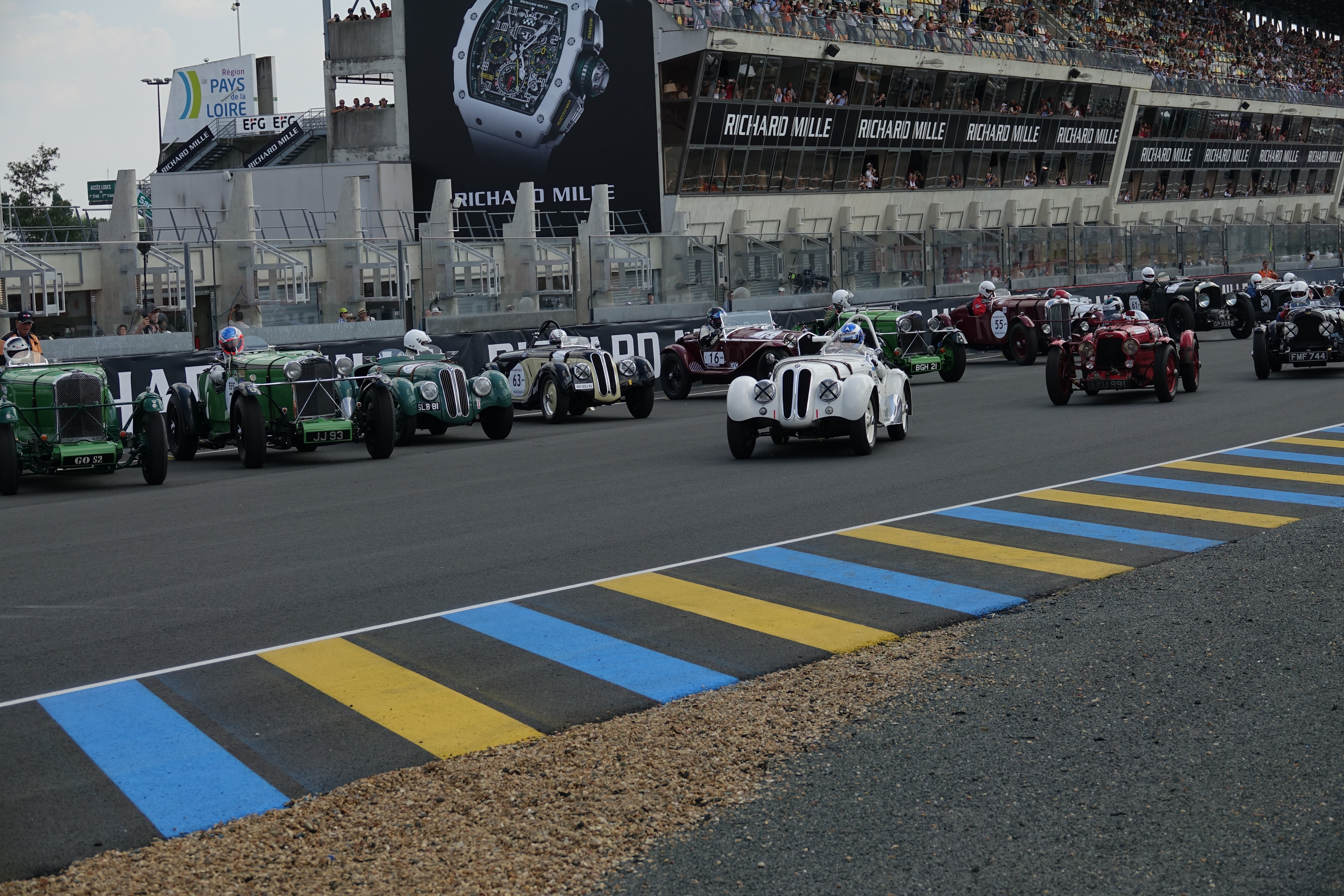
Le Mans start at Le Mans Classic 2018

Starting in 2002, the "Le Mans Classic" has been held as a biennial event on the full 13 km (8.1 mi) circuit in July. The races take place over a full 24-hour day/night cycle, with starts on set times allowing cars from the same era to compete simultaneously. A team typically consists of a car in each class. The team with the most points accumulated over five or six classes is declared the overall winner. The classes are based on the era in which the cars would have competed. The exact class requirements are re-evaluated for every event since the age for the youngest entries is shifted by two years for each event. In the first event, five classes ran more short races; later events have featured six classes running fewer but longer races. Drivers are required to have an FIA International Competition license. This event also includes a large Concours d'Elegance and auction.

== See also ==
- 24 Hours of Le Mans (motorcycle race)
- Petit Le Mans
- Road to Le Mans
- 24 Hours of LeMons
- Le Mans 24 Hours video games
- List of 24 Hours of Le Mans winners
- List of 24 Hours of Le Mans records
- Triple Crown of Motorsport
- Radio Le Mans
- Musée des 24 Heures du Mans
- FIA World Endurance Championship
- European Le Mans Series
- Le Mans Cup
- Asian Le Mans Series

== Additional references ==
- "Le Mans 1965" in Automobile Historique, no. 48, May 2005 (in French).
- "24 heures du Mans 1973" in Automobile Historique, no. 49, June/July 2005 (in French).
- Smale, Glen (2023). Le Mans 100: A Century at the World's Greatest Endurance Race. Motorbooks. ISBN 978-0-7603-7617-1.
