= List of MPs for constituencies in Northern Ireland (1992–1997) =

- Colours on map indicate the party allegiance of each constituency's MP.

This is a list of members of Parliament (MPs) elected to the House of Commons of the United Kingdom by Northern Irish constituencies for the 51st Parliament of the United Kingdom (1992 to 1997). There are 17 such constituencies, thirteen of which were represented by Unionists and four by Nationalists. It includes MPs elected at the 1992 United Kingdom general election, held on 1 May 1997.

The list is sorted by the name of the MP.

== Composition ==
Affiliation	Members
Ulster Unionist	9
SDLP	4
DUP	2
UPUP	1
Total	18

== MPs ==
Constituency	Party	MP
East Antrim	UUP	Roy Beggs
North Antrim	DUP	Ian Paisley
South Antrim	UUP	Clifford Forsythe
Belfast East	DUP	Peter Robinson
Belfast North	UUP	Cecil Walker
Belfast South	UUP	Martin Smyth
Belfast West	SDLP	Joe Hendron
North Down	UPUP	Jim Kilfedder
South Down	SDLP	Eddie McGrady
Fermanagh and South Tyrone	UUP	Ken Maginnis
Foyle	SDLP	John Hume
Lagan Valley	UUP	James Molyneaux
East Londonderry	UUP	William Ross
Mid Ulster	DUP	William McCrea
Newry and Armagh	SDLP	Seamus Mallon
Strangford	UUP	John Taylor
Upper Bann	UUP	David Trimble

- Robert McCartney from the UK Unionist Party was elected in the 1995 North Down by-election
