= North Down (UK Parliament constituency) =

Parliamentary constituency in the United Kingdom, 1950 onwards

- County constituency for the House of Commons
- Boundary of North Down in Northern Ireland
- Local government in Northern Ireland: Ards and North Down; Belfast
- Major settlements: Bangor; Holywood

Current constituency
- Created: 1950
- Member of Parliament: Alex Easton (Independent Unionist)

1885–1922
- Created from: Down
- Replaced by: Down

Map of current boundaries

North Down is a parliamentary constituency in the House of Commons of the United Kingdom. The current MP is Alex Easton, an Independent Unionist, who was elected at the 2024 United Kingdom general election.

== Constituency profile ==
North Down covers the north coast of the Ards Peninsula, including Bangor, which has several Alliance councillors. Historically a unionist area, North Down is currently represented by Alex Easton.

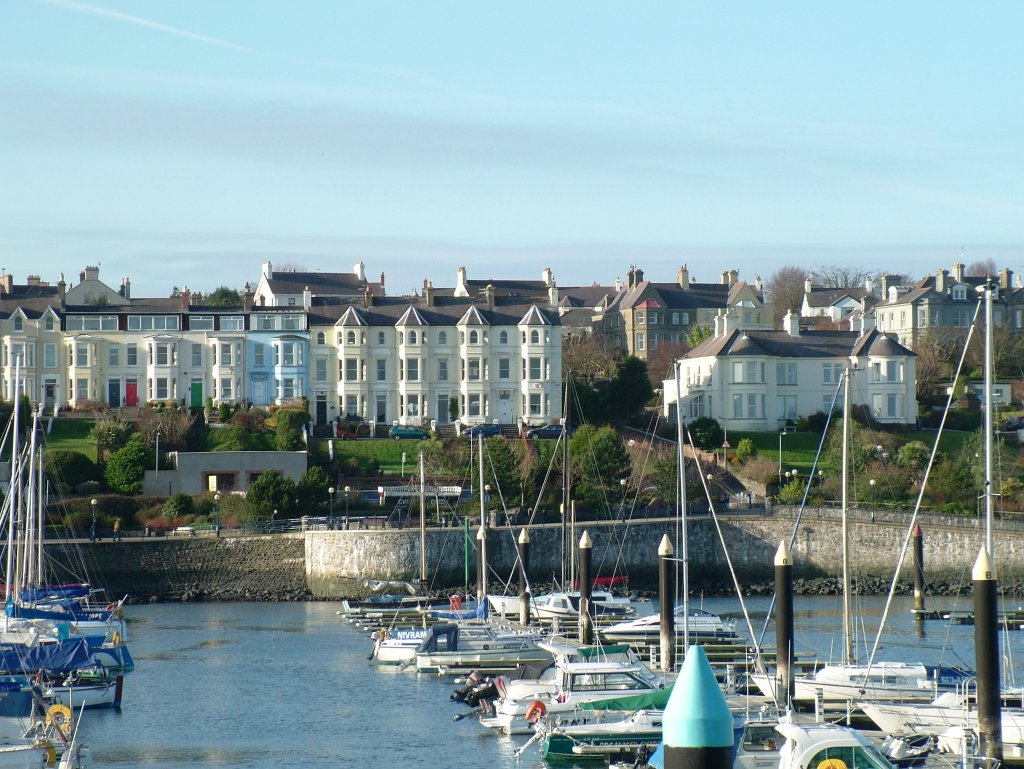
Bangor, County Down

== History ==
North Down is one of the most overwhelmingly unionist parts of Northern Ireland, with nationalist parties routinely getting less than 5% of the vote. At the 1955 general election, George Currie, the Ulster Unionist candidate, gained 96.8% of the vote, which he "bettered" in 1959 with some 98%. These shares of the popular votes are the highest ever achieved in a United Kingdom general election post-1832 Reform. However it has arguably the most volatile and unpredictable politics of the entire province. Whereas elsewhere there are effectively three fundamental battles fought in elections – between the Ulster Unionist Party and the Democratic Unionist Party to be the leading unionist party, between the Social Democratic and Labour Party and Sinn Féin to be the leading nationalist party, and between unionism and nationalism as a whole, North Down is different. The lack of any substantial nationalist vote renders the last two battles immaterial. Of Northern Ireland's five main parties, only the Ulster Unionist Party and the Alliance Party of Northern Ireland have historically had a significant organisation and support in the constituency, though the Democratic Unionist Party has recently started to gain a foothold where previously it was nearly non-existent.

In addition, the constituency has seen many substantial votes for smaller party groupings and individuals. The Ulster Popular Unionist Party, the Northern Ireland Conservatives, the UK Unionist Party and the Northern Ireland Women's Coalition have all polled substantially in the last fifteen years, whilst in local council elections many independent candidates gain sufficient votes to be elected. The area is the heartland of numerous "one-man parties", of which the Ulster Popular Unionist Party and the UK Unionist Party are the best known. There have been many examples of elected individuals changing party allegiance and often successfully defending their seats for the new party.

The constituency is the most prosperous in Northern Ireland and is widely considered to be the most similar to an English constituency. In part because of this the seat was the heartland of the Campaign for Equal Citizenship in the late 1980s which argued that political parties in Britain should organise and contest elections in Northern Ireland, in the hope that this would "normalise" the politics of the province. The Conservative Party established itself (having in earlier years been in alliance with the Ulster Unionist Party until a breakdown in relations in the 1970s) and to date has been relatively strongest in North Down though in recent years its vote has declined heavily from the brief surge in the elections held between 1989 and 1992.

Traditionally, levels of turnout in elections are very low by Northern Ireland standards. The one significant exception to the levels of turnout was the 1998 referendum on the Good Friday Agreement where turnout reached 80%, a total not come close to since 1921.

The parliamentary constituency was originally held by the Ulster Unionist Party with no serious opposition. In 1970 James Kilfedder was first elected and he proceeded to accumulate a high level of personal popularity in the constituency. In 1977 he left the Ulster Unionists in protest over their increasing support for Enoch Powell's proposed policy of integration for Northern Ireland, rather than the restoration of devolved government. Standing as an independent Unionist, Kilfedder successfully defended his seat against a UUP challenge in the 1979 general election. The following year he formed the Ulster Popular Unionist Party, with a few local councillors being elected on the label.

Kilfedder continued to hold his seat. Then in the 1987 general election he agreed an electoral pact with the Ulster Unionists and the Democratic Unionist Party to form a united opposition to the Anglo-Irish Agreement. However the local UUP candidate, Robert McCartney, was opposed to this pact and refused to withdraw. He was expelled from the UUP and so stood as a "Real Unionist" on a platform of complete integration for the province. Kilfedder retained the seat but with a reduced majority. As part of his platform for integration, McCartney had called for the major UK parties to organise and stand in the province and his result gave impetus to this campaign.

The Conservative Party did very well in the 1989 North Down Borough Council election when they became the largest party. They stood candidates in several Northern Ireland constituencies in the 1992 general election, but their strongest prospect was expected to be North Down. Kilfedder by this stage was taking the Conservative whip at Westminster and so was aggrieved by this (and subsequently given a knighthood). In the event the result was similar to 1987, with the Conservatives getting a similar vote to McCartney.

Kilfedder died in 1995, and his Ulster Popular Unionist Party faded away even before the resulting by-election. By this time support for the Northern Ireland Conservatives had collapsed, and there was much speculation about how the by-election would go. The Ulster Unionist Party was hopeful that it could retake the seat, but McCartney also stood, this time as a "UK Unionist" with the support of the Democratic Unionist Party. No candidate stood for the Popular Unionists or any nationalist party. On a low turnout, McCartney won, with the Conservative vote collapsing from 32% to 2.1%.

McCartney further established his UK Unionist Party and sought to challenge the existing unionist parties by offering a less sectarian alternative. He held his seat in the 1997 election and was also elected to both the Northern Ireland Peace Forum in 1996 and the Northern Ireland Assembly in 1998, though on each occasion he was the only UK Unionist elected from North Down. In the 1998 Assembly election the Ulster Unionists had their strongest result in the province and there was much speculation that they could unseat McCartney at the next general election.

A rather public row erupted over the selection of the UUP's candidate. The local Assembly member Peter Weir was selected, but his opposition to the Good Friday Agreement and David Trimble's leadership became very prominent and a running source of embarrassment to the party. Weir was subsequently deselected; his replacement as candidate, Sylvia Hermon, was supportive of both Trimble and the Agreement. Hermon, aided by the Alliance standing aside, won the seat.

Weir remained as an Assembly member but subsequently defected to the Democratic Unionist Party. In the 2003 Assembly election Weir successfully defended his seat for the DUP, who also gained another MLA from the Northern Ireland Women's Coalition. At the 2005 general election, the party battle was altered somewhat by the DUP running Weir, the Alliance putting up a candidate, and McCartney – after some speculation – deciding not to stand but to instead endorse Weir. In a strong contest, Hermon retained the seat, becoming at that time the only Ulster Unionist MP, though she later left that party. She retained her seat at the 2010 election as an independent with the second-biggest margin of any Northern Irish MP (behind Gerry Adams in Belfast West) and was re-elected at the 2015 and 2017 elections, although her majority was considerably reduced.

Hermon retired at the 2019 general election. The bulk of her support shifted to the Alliance, and a split unionist vote allowed Alliance candidate Stephen Farry to capture the seat, becoming the Alliance's only MP. In the 2024 general election, former MLA for North Down Alex Easton succeeded in capturing the seat from Stephen Farry, defeating him in a landslide, with the backing from the DUP and Traditional Unionist Voice, running as an Independent Unionist.

== Boundaries ==
From 1801 to 1885, County Down returned two MPs to the House of Commons of the United Kingdom sitting at the Palace of Westminster, with separate representation for the parliamentary boroughs of Downpatrick and Newry. Under the Redistribution of Seats Act 1885, Downpatrick ceased to exist as a parliamentary borough and the parliamentary county was divided into four divisions: North Down, East Down, West Down, and South Down.

Under the Redistribution of Seats (Ireland) Act 1918, Newry ceased to exist as a parliamentary borough, and the parliamentary county gained the additional division of Mid Down. Sinn Féin contested the 1918 general election on an abstentionist platform in its election manifesto pledging that instead of taking up any seats at Westminster, they would establish an assembly in Dublin. All MPs elected to Irish seats were invited to participate in the First Dáil convened in January 1919, but no members outside of Sinn Féin did so.

The Government of Ireland Act 1920 established the Parliament of Northern Ireland, which came into operation in 1921. The representation of Northern Ireland in the Parliament of the United Kingdom was reduced from 30 MPs to 13 MPs, taking effect at the 1922 United Kingdom general election. At Westminster, the five divisions of County Down were replaced by a two-member county constituency of Down. An eight-seat constituency of Down was created for the House of Commons of Northern Ireland, which formed the basis in republican theory for representation in the Second Dáil.

1885–1918	The baronies of Castlereagh Lower, Ards Lower, and Ards Upper, and so much of the barony of Castlereagh Upper, as comprises the parishes or parts of parishes of—Comber and Knockbreda, and so much of the parliamentary borough of Belfast as is in the County of Down.
1918–1922	The part of the rural district of Newtownards which is not included in the Mid Down division, and the urban districts of Bangor, Donaghadee, and Newtownards.

Under the Representation of the People Act 1948, all two-member constituencies were divided. Down was divided into the county constituencies of North Down and South Down. The area was reduced in 1983 as part of an expansion of Northern Ireland's constituencies from 12 to 17 with significant parts of the constituency transferred to Strangford. In January 1980, the Boundary Commission's original proposals suggested significantly reducing the size of the constituency and renaming it 'Loughside' on the grounds that this would avoid confusion in the event of borough council elections being held on the same day. In boundary changes proposed by a review in 1995, the seat exchanged territory with Strangford, losing the Dundonald area from Castlereagh and gaining a part of Ards.

1950–1974	The boroughs of Bangor and Newtownards; The urban districts of Donaghadee and Holywood; the rural districts of Castlereagh, Hillsborough and Newtownards.
1974–1983	The boroughs of Bangor and Newtownards; the urban districts of Donaghadee and Holywood; in the rural district of Castlereagh, the district electoral divisions of Ballycultra, Holywood Rural, and Craigavad, in the rural district of Hillsborough, the district electoral divisions of Annahilt, Ballykeel, Ballymacbrennan, Ballyskeagh, Ballyworfy, Blaris, Carryduff, Dromara, Drumbo, Glassdrumman, Hillsborough, Maze, Ouley, and Saintfield.
1983–1997	The district of North Down; and in the district of Castlereagh, the wards of Ballyhanwood, Carrowreagh, Dundonald, Enler, Gilnahirk, and Tullycarnet.
1997–2024	The district of North Down; and in the district of Ards, the wards of Donaghadee North, Donaghadee South and Millisle.
2024–	In Ards and North Down, the wards of Ballycrochan, Balygrainey, Ballyholme, Ballymagee, Bloomfield, Broadway, Bryansburn, the part of the Carrowdore ward to the north of the southern boundary of the 1997–2024 North Down constituency, Castle, Clandeboye, Cultra, Donaghadee, Groomsport, Harbour, Helen's Bay, Holywood, Kilcooley, the part of the Loughries ward to the east of the southern boundary of the 1997–2024 North Down constituency, Loughview, Rathgael, Rathmore, Silverbirch, Silverstream and Warren; and in Belfast, the Garnerville ward.

== Members of Parliament ==
The Member of Parliament since the 2024 general election is Alex Easton (Independent).

Election	Member	Party
1885	Thomas Waring	Conservative
1891	Thomas Waring	Irish Unionist
1898	John Blakiston-Houston	Irish Unionist
1900	Thomas Lorimer Corbett	Irish Unionist
1910	William Mitchell-Thomson	Irish Unionist
1918	Thomas Watters Brown	Irish Unionist
February 1922	Henry Wilson	UUP
July 1922	John Simms	UUP
1922	Constituency abolished	
1950	Constituency recreated	
1950	Walter Smiles	UUP
1953	Patricia Ford	UUP
1955	George Currie	UUP
1970	James Kilfedder	UUP
1977	James Kilfedder	Ind. Unionist
1980	James Kilfedder	UPUP
1995	Robert McCartney	UK Unionist
2001	Sylvia Hermon	UUP
2010	Sylvia Hermon	Independent
2019	Stephen Farry	Alliance
2024	Alex Easton	Independent

== Elections ==
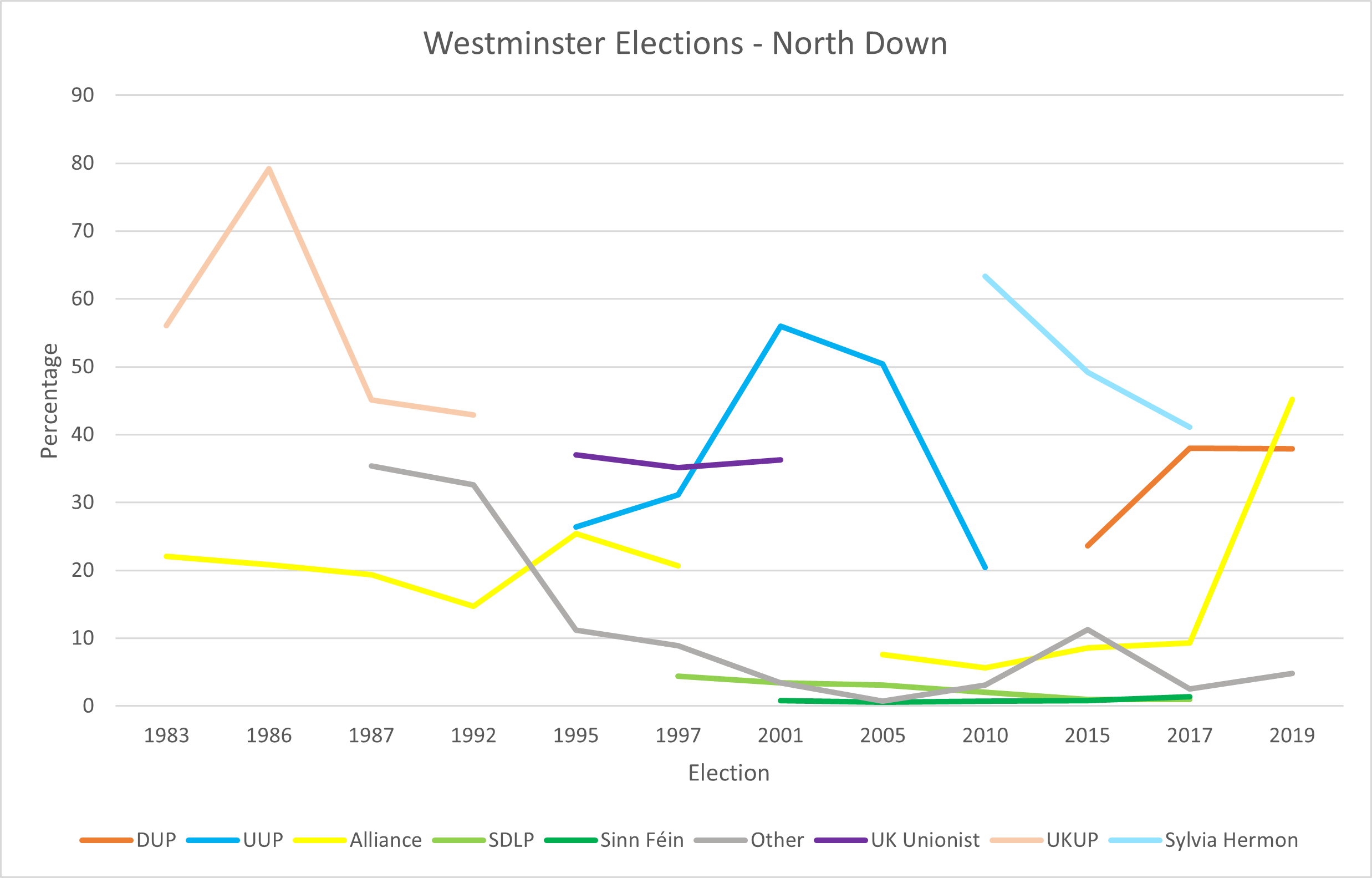
Westminster Election Results: North Down, 1983–2019

=== Elections in the 2020s ===
2024 general election: North Down
Party	Candidate	Votes	%	±%
Independent	Alex Easton	20,913	48.3	+9.6
Alliance	Stephen Farry	13,608	31.4	−13.5
UUP	Tim Collins	6,754	15.6	+3.7
Green (NI)	Barry McKee	1,247	2.9	New
SDLP	Déirdre Vaughan	657	1.5	New
Independent	Chris Carter	117	0.3	New
Majority		7,305	16.8	N/A
Turnout		43,296	58.6	−2.0
Registered electors		73,885		
Independent gain from Alliance		Swing	+11.6	

=== Elections in the 2010s ===
2019 general election: North Down
Party	Candidate	Votes	%	±%
Alliance	Stephen Farry	18,358	45.2	+35.9
DUP	Alex Easton	15,390	37.9	−0.1
UUP	Alan Chambers	4,936	12.1	New
NI Conservatives	Matthew Robinson	1,959	4.8	+2.4
Majority		2,968	7.3	N/A
Turnout		40,643	60.6	−0.4
Registered electors		67,099		
Alliance gain from Independent		Swing	+38.5	

2017 general election: North Down
Party	Candidate	Votes	%	±%
Independent	Lady Hermon	16,148	41.1	−8.1
DUP	Alex Easton	14,940	38.0	+14.4
Alliance	Andrew Muir	3,639	9.3	+0.7
Green (NI)	Steven Agnew	2,549	6.5	+1.1
NI Conservatives	Frank Shivers	941	2.4	−2.0
Sinn Féin	Thérèse McCartney	531	1.4	+0.6
SDLP	Caoímhe McNeill	400	1.0	0.0
Independent	Gavan Reynolds	37	0.1	New
Majority		1,208	3.1	−22.5
Turnout		39,268	61.0	+5.0
Registered electors		64,334		
Independent hold		Swing	−11.3	

2015 general election: North Down
Party	Candidate	Votes	%	±%
Independent	Lady Hermon	17,689	49.2	−14.1
DUP	Alex Easton	8,487	23.6	New
Alliance	Andrew Muir	3,086	8.6	+3.0
Green (NI)	Steven Agnew	1,958	5.4	+2.3
NI Conservatives	Mark Brotherston	1,593	4.4	New
UKIP	Jonny Lavery	1,482	4.1	New
TUV	William Cudworth	686	1.9	−3.0
SDLP	Tom Woolley	355	1.0	−1.0
CISTA	Glenn Donnelly	338	0.9	New
Sinn Féin	Therese McCartney	273	0.8	+0.1
Majority		9,202	25.6	−17.3
Turnout		35,947	56.0	+0.8
Registered electors		64,207		
Independent hold		Swing	−18.9	

2010 general election: North Down
Party	Candidate	Votes	%	±%
Independent	Lady Hermon	21,181	63.3	+13.9
UCU-NF	Ian Parsley	6,817	20.4	−30.0
Alliance	Stephen Farry	1,876	5.6	−2.0
TUV	Kaye Kilpatrick	1,634	4.9	New
Green (NI)	Steven Agnew	1,043	3.1	New
SDLP	Liam Logan	680	2.0	−1.1
Sinn Féin	Vincent Parker	250	0.7	+0.1
Majority		14,364	42.9	N/A
Turnout		33,481	55.2	+1.2
Registered electors		60,698		
Independent gain from UUP		Swing	+46.7	

Sylvia Hermon resigned the UUP whip in 2010, in protest against that party's electoral pact with the NI Conservatives to form UCU-NF.

=== Elections in the 2000s ===
2005 general election: North Down
Party	Candidate	Votes	%	±%
UUP	Lady Hermon	16,268	50.4	−5.6
DUP	Peter Weir	11,324	35.1	New
Alliance	David Alderdice	2,451	7.6	New
SDLP	Liam Logan	1,009	3.1	−0.3
NI Conservatives	Julian Robertson	822	2.5	+0.3
Independent	Chris Carter	211	0.7	−0.5
Sinn Féin	Janet McCrory	205	0.6	−0.2
Majority		4,944	15.3	−4.4
Turnout		32,290	54.0	−4.8
Registered electors		59,358		
UUP hold		Swing	−20.3	

2001 general election: North Down
Party	Candidate	Votes	%	±%
UUP	Lady Hermon	20,833	56.0	+24.9
UK Unionist	Bob McCartney	13,509	36.3	+1.2
SDLP	Marietta Farrell	1,275	3.4	−1.0
NI Conservatives	Julian Robertson	815	2.2	−2.8
Independent	Chris Carter	444	1.2	New
Sinn Féin	Eamonn McConvey	313	0.8	New
Majority		7,324	19.7	N/A
Turnout		37,189	58.8	+0.9
Registered electors		63,212		
UUP gain from UK Unionist		Swing	+9.9	

=== Elections in the 1990s ===
1997 general election: North Down
Party	Candidate	Votes	%	±%
UK Unionist	Bob McCartney	12,817	35.1	N/A
UUP	Alan McFarland	11,368	31.1	N/A
Alliance	Oliver Napier	7,554	20.7	+6.0
NI Conservatives	Leonard Fee	1,810	5.0	−27.0
SDLP	Marietta Farrell	1,602	4.4	New
NI Women's Coalition	Jane Morrice	1,240	3.4	New
Natural Law	Tom Mullins	108	0.3	−0.3
Northern Ireland Party	Robert Mooney	57	0.2	New
Majority		1,449	4.0	N/A
Turnout		36,556	57.9	−7.6
Registered electors		63,101		
UK Unionist hold		Swing		

The figures and result are compared to the 1992 general election, not the 1995 by-election.

1995 North Down by-election
Party	Candidate	Votes	%	±%
UK Unionist	Bob McCartney	10,124	37.0	New
UUP	Alan McFarland	7,232	26.4	New
Alliance	Oliver Napier	6,970	25.4	+10.7
Ind. Unionist	Alan Chambers	2,170	7.9	New
NI Conservatives	Stuart Sexton	583	2.1	−29.9
Free Para Lee Clegg Now	Michael Brooks	108	0.4	New
Independent Voice	Christopher Carter	101	0.4	New
Natural Law	James Anderson	100	0.4	−0.2
Majority		2,892	10.6	N/A
Turnout		27,388	38.6	−26.9
Registered electors		70,872		
UK Unionist gain from UPUP		Swing		

1992 general election: North Down
Party	Candidate	Votes	%	±%
UPUP	James Kilfedder	19,305	42.9	−2.2
NI Conservatives	Laurence Kennedy	14,371	32.0	New
Alliance	Addie Morrow	6,611	14.7	−4.7
DUP	Denny Vitty	4,414	9.8	New
Natural Law	Andrew Wilmot	255	0.6	New
Majority		4,934	10.9	+1.2
Turnout		44,956	65.5	+2.7
Registered electors		68,662		
UPUP hold		Swing		

=== Elections in the 1980s ===
1987 general election: North Down
Party	Candidate	Votes	%	±%
UPUP	James Kilfedder	18,420	45.1	−11.0
Real Unionist	Bob McCartney	14,467	35.4	New
Alliance	John Cushnahan	7,932	19.4	−2.7
Majority		3,953	9.7	−24.3
Turnout		40,819	62.8	−3.4
Registered electors		65,018		
UPUP hold		Swing		

By-election 1986: North Down
Party	Candidate	Votes	%	±%
UPUP	James Kilfedder	30,793	79.2	+23.1
Alliance	John Cushnahan	8,066	20.8	−1.3
Majority		22,727	58.4	+24.4
Turnout		38,859	62.8	−3.4
Registered electors		64,276		
UPUP hold		Swing		

1983 general election: North Down
Party	Candidate	Votes	%	±%
UPUP	James Kilfedder	22,861	56.1	−3.5
Alliance	John Cushnahan	9,015	22.1	+0.5
UUP	Bob McCartney	8,261	20.3	+1.4
SDLP	Cathal O'Baioll	645	1.6	New
Majority		13,846	34.0	−4.0
Turnout		40,782	66.2	+4.0
Registered electors		61,519		
UPUP gain from Ind. Unionist		Swing		

In 1980 Kilfedder formed the small Ulster Popular Unionist Party and contested all subsequent elections under this label.

=== Elections in the 1970s ===
1979 general election: North Down
Party	Candidate	Votes	%	±%
Ind. Unionist	James Kilfedder	36,989	59.6	−12.4
Alliance	Keith Jones	13,364	21.6	+3.1
UUP	Clifford Smyth	11,728	18.9	−53.1
Majority		23,625	38.0	N/A
Turnout		62,081	62.2	+1.3
Registered electors		99,861		
Ind. Unionist gain from UUP		Swing		

Kilfedder left the Ulster Unionists in 1977, in opposition to Enoch Powell's proposals for integration instead of devolution for Northern Ireland, and defended his seat as an Independent Ulster Unionist. The new Ulster Unionist candidate was Clifford Smyth, who had previously been a Democratic Unionist Party assembly member in North Antrim.

October 1974 general election: North Down
Party	Candidate	Votes	%	±%
UUP	James Kilfedder	40,996	72.0	+11.9
Alliance	Keith Jones	9,973	17.5	New
Unionist Party NI	William Brownlow	6,037	10.6	New
Majority		31,023	54.5	+28.5
Turnout		57,006	60.9	−5.5
Registered electors		93,604		
UUP hold		Swing		

February 1974 general election: North Down
Party	Candidate	Votes	%	±%
UUP	James Kilfedder	38,169	61.1	−7.9
Pro-Assembly Unionist	Roy Bradford	21,943	35.1	New
SDLP	Dermot Curran	2,376	3.8	New
Majority		16,226	26.0	−25.3
Turnout		62,488	66.4	−0.4
Registered electors		94,069		
UUP hold		Swing		

1970 general election: North Down
Party	Candidate	Votes	%	±%
UUP	James Kilfedder	55,679	69.0	−9.5
NI Labour	Kenneth Young	14,246	17.7	New
Ind. Unionist	Robert Samuel Nixon	6,408	7.9	New
Independent	Ritchie McGladdery	3,321	4.1	New
Ulster Liberal	Hamilton Simmons-Gooding	1,076	1.3	−20.2
Majority		41,433	51.3	−5.7
Turnout		80,730	66.8	+11.9
Registered electors		121,196		
UUP hold		Swing		

=== Elections in the 1960s ===
1966 general election: North Down
Party	Candidate	Votes	%	±%
UUP	George Currie	38,706	78.5	+5.0
Ulster Liberal	Sheelagh Murnaghan	10,582	21.5	+15.3
Majority		28,124	57.0	+2.4
Turnout		49,288	48.9	−14.2
Registered electors		100,775		
UUP hold		Swing		

1964 general election: North Down
Party	Candidate	Votes	%	±%
UUP	George Currie	45,091	73.5	−24.5
NI Labour	Edward Bell	11,571	18.9	New
Ulster Liberal	Albert McElroy	3,797	6.2	New
Ind. Republican	Paddy McGrattan	855	1.4	New
Majority		33,520	54.6	−41.4
Turnout		61,314	63.1	+4.2
Registered electors		97,151		
UUP hold		Swing		

=== Elections in the 1950s ===
1959 general election: North Down
Party	Candidate	Votes	%	±%
UUP	George Currie	51,773	98.0	+1.1
Sinn Féin	Joseph Campbell	1,039	2.0	−1.2
Majority		50,734	96.0	+2.3
Turnout		52,812	58.9	−2.2
Registered electors		89,886		
UUP hold		Swing	+1.1	

1955 general election: North Down
Party	Candidate	Votes	%	±%
UUP	George Currie	50,315	96.9	+15.5
Sinn Féin	Joseph Campbell	1,637	3.2	New
Majority		48,678	93.7	+30.9
Turnout		51,952	61.1	−4.6
Registered electors		84,968		
UUP hold		Swing		

1953 North Down by-election
Party	Candidate	Votes	%	±%
UUP	Patricia Ford	Unopposed		
Registered electors				
UUP hold				

1951 general election: North Down
Party	Candidate	Votes	%	±%
UUP	Walter Smiles	43,285	81.4	+2.0
NI Labour	Albert McElroy	9,914	18.6	−2.0
Majority		33,371	62.8	+4.0
Turnout		53,199	65.7	−2.4
Registered electors		80,921		
UUP hold		Swing		

1950 general election: North Down
Party	Candidate	Votes	%	±%
UUP	Walter Smiles	41,810	79.4	N/A
NI Labour	Albert McElroy	10,836	20.6	N/A
Majority		30,974	58.8	N/A
Turnout		52,646	68.1	N/A
Registered electors		77,316		
UUP win (new seat)				

=== Elections in the 1920s ===
July 1922 North Down by-election
Party	Candidate	Votes	%	±%
UUP	John Simms	Unopposed		
Registered electors				
UUP hold				

February 1922 North Down by-election
Party	Candidate	Votes	%	±%
UUP	Henry Wilson	Unopposed		
Registered electors				
UUP hold				

1921 North Down by-election
Party	Candidate	Votes	%	±%
UUP	Thomas Watters Brown	Unopposed		
Registered electors				
UUP hold				

=== Elections in the 1910s ===
1918 general election: North Down
Party	Candidate	Votes	%	±%
Irish Unionist	Thomas Watters Brown	9,200	81.0	N/A
Ind. Unionist	John Alexander Davidson	2,153	19.0	New
Majority		7,047	62.0	N/A
Turnout		11,353	61.7	N/A
Registered electors		18,399		
Irish Unionist hold		Swing	N/A	

December 1910 general election: North Down
Party	Candidate	Votes	%	±%
Irish Unionist	William Mitchell-Thomson	Unopposed		
Registered electors				
Irish Unionist hold				

1910 North Down by-election
Party	Candidate	Votes	%	±%
Irish Unionist	William Mitchell-Thomson	Unopposed		
Registered electors				
Irish Unionist hold				

January 1910 general election: North Down
Party	Candidate	Votes	%	±%
Irish Unionist	Thomas Lorimer Corbett	Unopposed		
Registered electors				
Irish Unionist hold				

=== Elections in the 1900s ===
1906 general election: North Down
Party	Candidate	Votes	%	±%
Irish Unionist	Thomas Lorimer Corbett	4,878	58.2	0.0
Russellite Unionist	Alexander Annan Adams	2,603	34.8	New
Majority		2,275	30.4	+14.0
Turnout		7,481	78.1	0.0
Registered electors		9,652		
Irish Unionist hold		Swing	N/A	

1900 general election: North Down
Party	Candidate	Votes	%	±%
Irish Unionist	Thomas Lorimer Corbett	4,493	58.2	N/A
Irish Unionist	Robert Sharman-Crawford	3,230	41.8	N/A
Majority		1,263	16.4	N/A
Turnout		7,723	78.1	N/A
Registered electors		9,886		
Irish Unionist hold		Swing	N/A	

=== Elections in the 1890s ===
1898 North Down by-election
Party	Candidate	Votes	%	±%
Irish Unionist	John Blakiston-Houston	3,381	52.1	N/A
Irish Unionist	Thomas Corbett	3,107	47.9	N/A
Majority		274	4.2	N/A
Turnout		6,488	66.9	N/A
Registered electors		9,702		
Irish Unionist hold		Swing	N/A	

1895 general election: North Down
Party	Candidate	Votes	%	±%
Irish Unionist	Thomas Waring	Unopposed		
Registered electors				
Irish Unionist hold				

1892 general election: North Down
Party	Candidate	Votes	%	±%
Irish Unionist	Thomas Waring	Unopposed		
Registered electors				
Irish Unionist hold				

=== Elections in the 1880s ===
1886 general election: North Down
Party	Candidate	Votes	%	±%
Irish Conservative	Thomas Waring	4,959	83.7	+23.4
Irish Parliamentary	Richard McNabb	964	16.3	New
Majority		3,995	67.4	+46.8
Turnout		5,923	63.8	−13.3
Registered electors		9,277		
Irish Conservative hold		Swing		

1885 general election: North Down
Party	Candidate	Votes	%	±%
Irish Conservative	Thomas Waring	4,315	60.3	
Liberal	John Shaw Brown	2,841	39.7	
Majority		1,474	20.6	
Turnout		7,156	77.1	
Registered electors		9,277		
Irish Conservative win (new seat)				

== Sources ==
- Guardian Unlimited Politics (Election results from 1992 to the present)
- http://www.psr.keele.ac.uk/ (Election results from 1951 to the present)
- Leigh Rayment's Historical List of MPs – Constituencies beginning with "D" (part 3)
- Walker, Brian M., ed. (1978). Parliamentary Election Results in Ireland, 1801–1922. Dublin: Royal Irish Academy. ISBN 0901714127.
- Stenton, M.; Lees, S., eds. (1978). Who's Who of British members of parliament: Volume II 1886–1918. The Harvester Press.
- Stenton, M.; Lees, S., eds. (1979). Who's Who of British members of parliament: Volume III 1919–1945. The Harvester Press.
- F. W. S. Craig, British Parliamentary Election Results 1950 – 1970
- The Liberal Year Book For 1917, Liberal Publication Department
- The Constitutional Year Book For 1912, Conservative Central Office
- The Constitutional Year Book For 1894, Conservative Central Office
