= 2005 Ulster Unionist Party leadership election =

- 24 June 2005
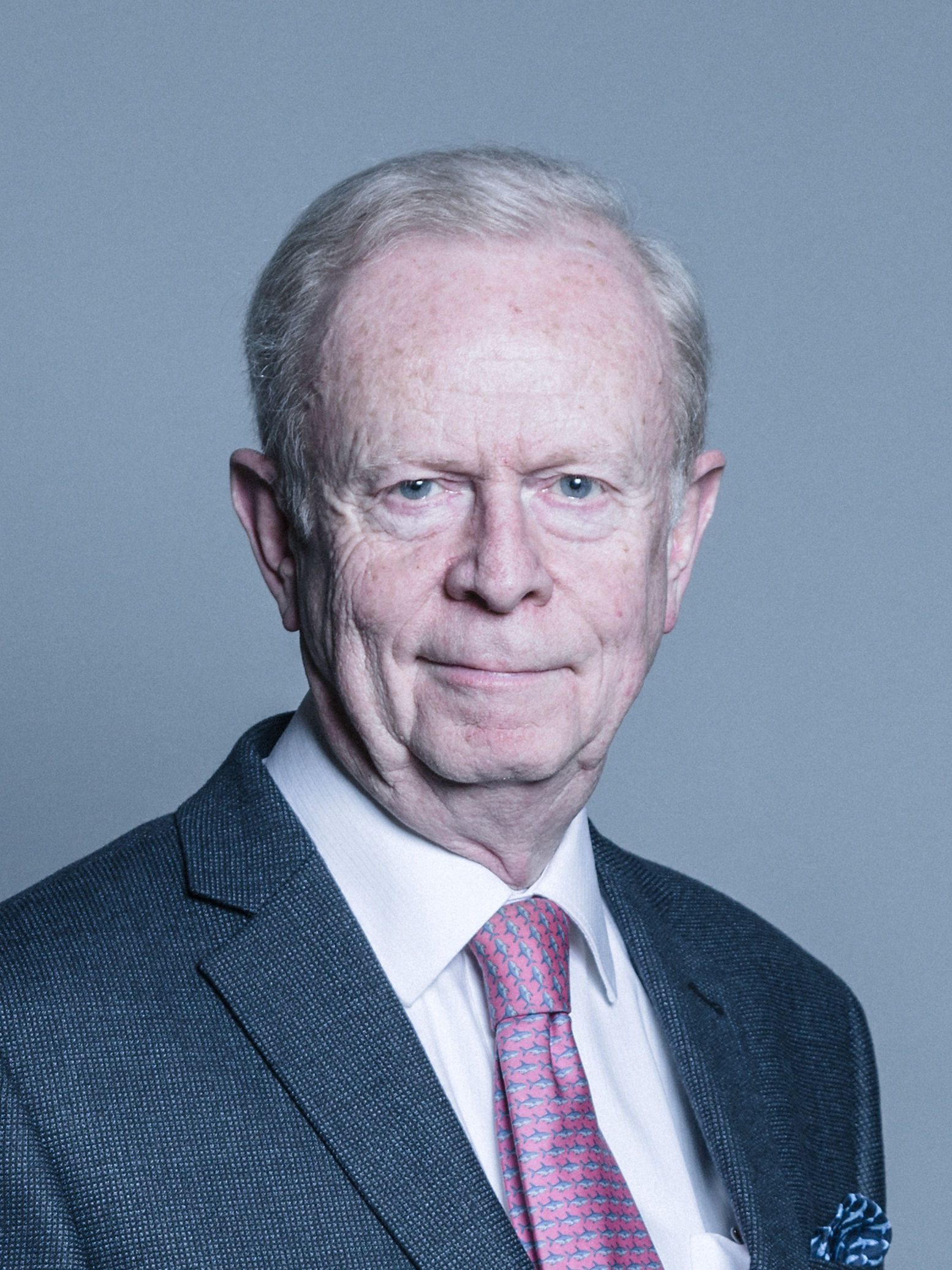

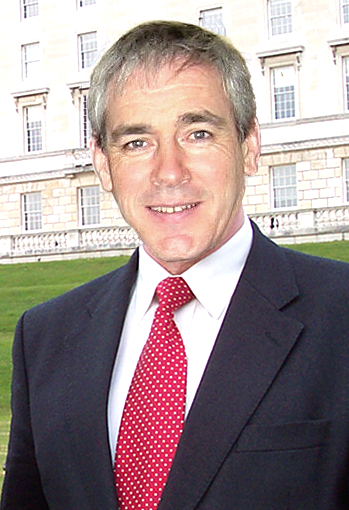

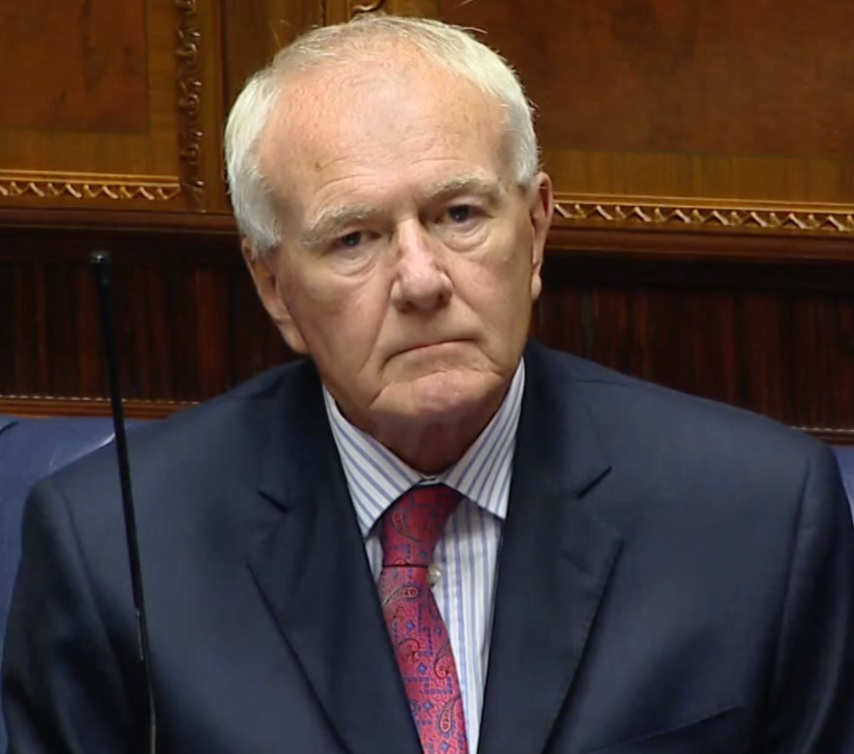
Candidate	Sir Reg Empey	Alan McFarland	David McNarry
Party	UUP	UUP	UUP
First Round	295	266	54
Percentage	48.0%	43.3%	8.8%
Second Round	321	287	Eliminated
Percentage	52.8%	47.2%	Eliminated
Leader before election
David Trimble
Elected Leader
Reg Empey

The 2005 Ulster Unionist Party leadership election began on 7 May 2005 when David Trimble resigned as leader of the Ulster Unionist Party following his party's poor performance in the 2005 general election when it lost all but one of its seats, including Trimble's own. Following his resignation, the UUP's executive committee charged Sir Reg Empey, Lady Hermon and Lord Rogan with the interim leadership of the Party.

This was the first occasion when the UUP leadership was contested under the Party's new constitution. Therefore, this was the first occasion where the candidates were not proposed and seconded from the floor of the meeting, but in writing one week before the meeting.

Trimble's successor was elected by delegates to the Ulster Unionist Council who met on 24 June 2005. After two rounds of voting the election was won by Sir Reg Empey.

== Candidates ==
Nominations for the leadership closed on 17 June.

=== Standing ===
- Sir Reg Empey
- Alan McFarland
- David McNarry

=== Declined to run ===
The following prominent Ulster Unionist Party politicians were speculated upon by media organisations but declined to run:

- David Burnside, an MP until 2005
- Sylvia Hermon, UUP's only MP after the general election.
- Lord Maginnis of Drumglass, an MP until 2001.
- Lord Kilclooney, an MP until 2001, and a former minister in the Government of Northern Ireland

=== Outsiders ===
Some in the party called for a figure from outside the party to become the next leader; however those named declined. They included:

- Colonel Tim Collins
- Robert McCartney

Collins was named by Lord Kilclooney as his preferred candidate on his announcement that he would not run. McCartney announced that he would seek to rejoin the party he left in the 1980s intending to become leader should a majority or a significant number of delegates spoil their ballots. Less than 5 delegates spoilt their ballots in the event.

== Timeline of events ==
- 6 May 2005 - In the general election David Trimble loses his constituency of Upper Bann, prompting speculation that he will step down as leader.
- 7 May 2005 - Trimble declares he is resigning.
- 8 May 2005 - The party's sole MP, Sylvia Hermon, is reported to be considering standing for the leadership, but states she also has strong family commitments.
- 11 May 2005 - Hermon states she wishes to see the UUP move in a "more liberal direction", away from the rival Democratic Unionist Party.
- 14 May 2005 - A meeting of the UUP Executive calls a special meeting of the Ulster Unionist Council for 24 June. In the interim it places the running of the party in the joint hands of Party President Lord Rogan, MLA Sir Reg Empey and the party's sole MP Sylvia Hermon.
- 14 May 2005 - David Burnside gives an interview in which he suggests a Hermon leadership would be a disaster, taking the party down "some sort of softy, wishy-washy, liberal sort of route." He declines to run and endorses Lord Kilclooney as an interim leader.
- 17 May 2005 - Hermon declares she will not be a candidate due to family commitments.
- 7 June 2005 - David McNarry becomes the first candidate to publicly enter the race. He declares he wants "to take the party out of denial."
- 8 June 2005 - Lord Kilclooney issues a statement that he would be prepared to back a leader from outside the party who could bring the "radical new approach the party leads" and declines to run himself. He suggests Colonel Tim Collins would be a good choice, but the latter declines, stating he has "no experience of politics."
- 9 June 2005 - Sir Reg Empey formally launches a bid for the leadership, with the backing of more than half the party's MLAs and its sole MEP Jim Nicholson. He pledges to end "the days of heavy-handedness" and listen to grassroots supporters.
- 13 June 2005 - Alan McFarland announces his intention to stand, declaring that he is leading "a grass roots rebellion". He pledges to rebuild the party structure, impose a sense of self-discipline and refocus it upon the issues that matter to ordinary voters. Amongst those present at his launch are the party's sole MP, Sylvia Hermon.
- 13 June 2005 - It is reported that members of the UUP are asking Robert McCartney to put his name forward, despite no longer being a member of the party. McCartney rejects rejoining the party prior to the leadership election.
- 15 June 2005 - Lord Maginnis declares that he will not seek the leadership.
- 17 June 2005 - Nominations close. Empey, McFarland and McNarry are all nominated.
- 24 June 2005 - The Ulster Unionist Council meets.

== Results ==
At the meeting delegates to the Ulster Unionist Council voted in a succession of ballots until one candidate had an absolute majority.

In the first round, No candidate achieved a majority and David McNarry, as the lowest placed candidate, was eliminated.

Within the second round, Sir Reg Empey was elected.

Candidate	Total			
Candidate	Round 1		Round 2	
Candidate	Votes	%	Votes	%
Sir Reg Empey ✓	295	48.0	321	52.8
Alan McFarland	266	43.3	287	47.2
David McNarry ✗	54	8.8		
Total	615	100	608	100
