= James Kilfedder =

British politician (1928–1995)

Sir James Kilfedder

Leader of the Ulster Popular Unionist Party
- In office 1980 – 20 March 1995
- Preceded by: Party created
- Succeeded by: Party dissolved

Member of Parliament for North Down
- In office 18 June 1970 – 20 March 1995
- Preceded by: George Currie
- Succeeded by: Robert McCartney

Member of Parliament for Belfast West
- In office 15 October 1964 – 10 March 1966
- Preceded by: Patricia McLaughlin
- Succeeded by: Gerry Fitt

Personal details
- Born: James Alexander Kilfedder; 16 July 1928 Kinlough, County Leitrim, Ireland
- Died: 20 March 1995 (aged 66) London, England
- Resting place: Roselawn Cemetery, East Belfast, Northern Ireland
- Party: UUP (until 1977); UPUP (1980–1995)
- Spouse: Never married
- Education: Trinity College, Dublin; King's Inns; Gray's Inn
- Profession: Barrister

Sir James Alexander Kilfedder (16 July 1928 – 20 March 1995) was a Northern Irish unionist politician. He was the last unionist to represent Belfast West in the House of Commons.

== Early life ==
Jim Kilfedder born in Kinlough, a village in the north of County Leitrim in what was then the Irish Free State. His family later moved to Enniskillen in neighbouring County Fermanagh in Northern Ireland, where Jim was raised. Kilfedder was educated at Portora Royal School in Enniskillen and at Trinity College, Dublin (TCD). During his time at TCD, he acted as Auditor of the College Historical Society, one of the oldest undergraduate debating societies in the world. He became a barrister, called to the Irish Bar at King's Inns, Dublin, in 1952 and to the English Bar at Gray's Inn in 1958. He practised law in London.

== Political career ==
At the 1964 general election, Kilfedder was elected as an Ulster Unionist Party (UUP) Member of Parliament for West Belfast. During the campaign, there were riots in Divis Street when the Royal Ulster Constabulary (RUC) removed an Irish flag from the Sinn Féin offices of Billy McMillen. This followed a complaint by Kilfedder in the form of a telegram to the Minister of Home Affairs, Brian McConnell. It read "Remove tricolour in Divis Street which is aimed to provoke and insult loyalists of Belfast." Kilfedder lost his seat at the 1966 election to Gerry Fitt. He was elected again in the 1970 general election for North Down, and held the seat until his death in 1995.

Kilfedder was elected for North Down in the 1973 Assembly election, signing Brian Faulkner's pledge to support the White Paper which eventually established the Sunningdale Agreement but becoming an anti-White Paper Unionist after the election. In 1975 he stood for the same constituency in the Constitutional Convention election, polling over three quotas as a UUP member of the United Ulster Unionist Coalition (UUUC) although he refused to sign the UUUC's pledge of conduct.

He left the UUP in 1977 in opposition to the party's policies tending to integrationism, preferring to advocate the restoration of the Stormont administration. For a time he sat as an "Independent Ulster Unionist". He contested the 1979 European Parliament Election under that label, finishing fourth in the count for the three seats, having overtaken the UUP leader Harry West on transfers.

In 1980, he formed the Ulster Popular Unionist Party (UPUP) and was re-elected under that label in all subsequent elections. He again topped the poll in the 1982 Assembly election and was elected as Speaker of the Assembly (to 1986). He generally took the Conservative whip at Westminster. Whilst Speaker, he was paid more than the Prime Minister.

== Death and legacy ==
On 20 March 1995, while travelling by train into London from Gatwick Airport, Sir Jim Kilfedder died of a heart attack. This was the same day that the Belfast Telegraph carried a front-page story saying that an Ulster MP had been targeted as one of twenty MPs invited by the LGBT rights organisation OutRage! in a letter to come out.

He died unmarried, survived by two sisters. Kilfedder was described as

"a phenomenon or perhaps a left-over from a remote era of Northern Irish politics when Ulster was represented by such figures as Lord Robert Grosvenor, Major Robin Chichester-Clark, Stratton Mills, and Rafton Pounder."

Kilfedder was described by Democratic Unionist Party MLA Peter Weir as "the best MP North Down ever had."

The UPUP did not outlive him, and the by-election for his Commons seat was won by Robert McCartney, standing for the UK Unionist Party. McCartney had fought the seat in the 1987 general election as a "Real Unionist" with the backing of the Campaign for Equal Citizenship. At the 1987 election count, in his victory speech, Kilfedder had "attacked his rival's supporters as 'a rag tag collection of people who shame the name of civil rights.' He said they included communists, Protestant paramilitaries and gay rights supporters and he promised to expose more in future." McCartney lost North Down in 2001 to Lady Hermon of the UUP.

Kilfedder's personal and political papers (including constituency affairs) are held at the Public Record Office of Northern Ireland, reference D4127.

Kilfedder is buried in Roselawn Cemetery in East Belfast, Northern Ireland.

Parliament of the United Kingdom
Preceded by Patricia McLaughlin	Member of Parliament for Belfast West; 1964–1966	Succeeded by Gerry Fitt
Preceded by George Currie	Member of Parliament for North Down; 1970–1995	Succeeded by Robert McCartney
Northern Ireland Assembly (1973)
New assembly	Assembly Member for North Down; 1973–1974	Assembly abolished
Northern Ireland Constitutional Convention
New convention	Member for North Down; 1975–1976	Convention dissolved
Northern Ireland Assembly (1982)
New assembly	MPA for North Down; 1982–1986	Assembly abolished
New office	Speaker of the Northern Ireland Assembly; 1982–1986	Assembly abolished
