= Thomas Lorimer Corbett =

British politician

Member of Parliament for North Down
- In office October 1900 – 6 April 1910
- Preceded by: John Blakiston-Houston
- Succeeded by: William Mitchell-Thomson

Personal details
- Born: 1854 Glasgow, Scotland
- Died: 6 April 1910 (aged 55–56) London, England
- Party: Conservative; Irish Unionist

Thomas Lorimer Corbett (1854 – 6 April 1910) was a British Conservative politician.

Corbett was born in Glasgow, Scotland, and was the eldest son of Thomas Corbett of Cove, Dunbartonshire and his wife, Sarah Cameron.

Following a private education, Corbett moved to Streatham, London. He became secretary of the Clapham Conservative Association, and a member of the National Union of Conservative Associations. He was elected to the first London County Council in 1889, as a Moderate Party councillor for Clapham electoral division. He was defeated by his Progressive Party opponent at the next council election in March 1892.

Corbett's opposition to Home Rule in Ireland led to him standing as a parliamentary candidate for the Irish Unionists at the 1892 and 1895 general elections, when he unsuccessfully contested East Tyrone.

In 1895 he regained his seat on the London County Council, and retained it in 1898. He was chief whip of the Moderate Party, and held the office of deputy chairman of the council in 1899 – 1900.

In 1898 Colonel Thomas Waring, the Unionist Member of Parliament for North Down died. Corbett contested the ensuing by-election, but was narrowly defeated by his opponent, John Blakiston-Houston. Both candidates were members of the same party, and it was felt that Blakiston-Houston won the seat by securing the Roman Catholic vote in the constituency. Corbett, in contrast, was described as having "somewhat extreme Protestant opinions". Two years later a general election was held, and Corbett succeeded in being elected as MP for North Down. He held the seat at the next two elections in 1906 and January 1910.

His younger brother, Archibald Cameron Corbett, was Liberal Unionist MP for Glasgow Tradeston from 1885 to 1911.

T L Corbett died suddenly from pneumonia in April 1910 at his London home.

Parliament of the United Kingdom
| Preceded by John Blakiston-Houston | Member of Parliament for North Down; 1900–1910 | Succeeded by William Mitchell-Thomson |
