= Women in the Orange Order =

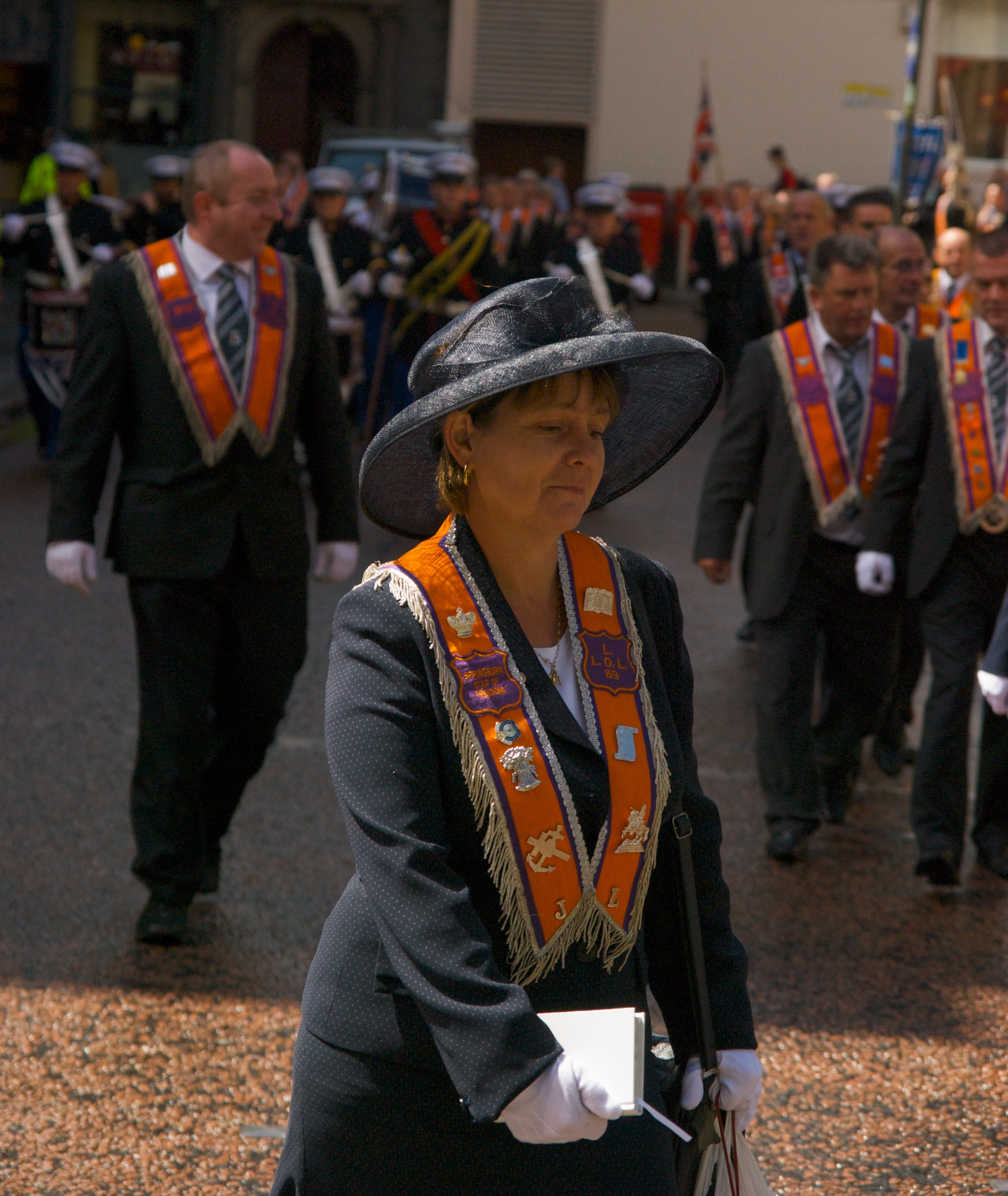
An Orangewoman marching in Glasgow, Scotland

Women in the Orange Order, referred to as Orangewomen or Orange Sisters, have played a vital role in the Orange Order, a Protestant and Unionist fraternity, since its formation in Loughgall, County Armagh in 1795, following the Battle of the Diamond. The first female Orange Association was established in 1800. Female Orangeism gained popularlity in Ireland, Great Britain and North America during the nineteenth and early twentieth centuries, creating their own Orange lodges. Orangewomen have dedicated considerable efforts to charity and political activism, and, in recent years, have used various media platforms to improve public perceptions of the institution.

A Women's Loyal Orange Lodge (WLOL) or Ladies' Loyal Orange Lodge (LLOL) is a private local lodge that is solely run by women. The Orangewomen annually hold an election of officers to vote on the Worshipful Mistress, Deputy Mistress, Committee members and so on. The Worshipful Mistress presides over lodge meetings. The first women's Orange lodge was established in 1801. There are women’s Orange lodges in nine jurisdictions around the world. There are over 90 active women's lodges in Ireland alone, with over 1,500 Orangewomen in Northern Ireland.

Mixed-gender lodges also run in Northern Ireland, England and Scotland, they are especially popular in Africa and Oceania, where the Grand Orange Lodge of New Zealand is an fully integrated structure. The "Grand Master" title is used as the title of the New Zealand Grand Orange Lodge whether or not they are male or female. It is held by Sister Sheryll Rodgers, alongside Immediate Past Grand Master Sister Beverley Buist, and Deputy Grand Master Sister Gina Lindsey-Crawford. Women meet triennially at the Imperial Orange Council from their respective national Grand Orange Lodges.

All-women governing bodies, often called Orange Associations, and historically Auxiliary Associations, operate with the same principles as male governing bodies. In the British Isles, there is the Association of Loyal Orangewomen of Ireland, Ladies Orange Association of Scotland and Loyal Institution of Orange Ladies of England.

== History ==
In 1800, only a few years after the foundation of the Orange Order, a female Orange Association and lodge was established.

The Museum of Orange Heritage uncovered evidence of Orange warrants issued by the female Orange Association, where in May 1801, a Women's Orange Lodge was established in Bray, County Wicklow. Orange warrant No. 8 was issued to Mrs Letitia Saunders by Mistress Ann Smith of the Female Orange Lodge. The Female Orange Lodge was located on Cuffe Street, Dublin.

A mixed-gender Loyal Orange Lodge participating in an Orange walk.

In 1876, in Philadelphia, United States, the first women's Orange Association that is still active today was established, becoming an auxiliary order officially in 1906.

In December 1887, the Association of Loyal Orangewomen of Ireland was established by the Hon. Helena de Moleyns.

During the late 19th-century political controversy surrounding Irish Home Rule, female involvement expanded into British politics. In 1887, Lady Randolph Churchill, mother of Winston Churchill and a political hostess, joined the Orange Women's Association in London, which also formed that year. Her influence in the association pushed the gap closer between working class loyalists and high-society Tory opposition to Prime Minister William Ewart Gladstone's Home Rule bills.

In 1888, Orangewomen in Canada began directly engaging in the institution when Mary Tulk formed the first Canadian Orange association in Hamilton, Ontario. In 1894, the Lodges of the Ladies’ Orange Benevolent Association of Canada was founded as an auxiliary to men's lodges. It was incorporated the following year, and allowed women to hold public leadership opportunities in a society in which such roles were otherwise restricted. Its founder, Mary Catherine Cullum, served as Grand Mistress until 1912.

The Association of Loyal Orangewomen of Ireland was largely left dormant by the early 1900s. In 1911, under the leadership of Mrs. R. H. Johnston of Bawnboy House, County Cavan, and with the official consent of the Grand Orange Lodge of Ireland, the women's branch was formally reconstituted to push the influence of women in the Orange Order. This effort led to the reestablishment of the Association of Loyal Orangewomen of Ireland that operated similarly to a Grand Orange Lodge. This is the organisation that remains in place today.

In February 1912, the first women's Irish Orange lodge warrants were issued under the reestablished association. The first was Women's Orange Lodge of Lodge No. 1, founded by Margaret Bridgett. In December that year, she married the Belfast County Grand Master John Drennan. In April 1918, she went on to become the first elected Grand Mistress of the Sandy Row Women’s LOL No. 17 The second warrant was issued for the establishment of an Orange lodge in Ballymacarrett, Belfast, and the third warrant saw the establishment of an Orange lodge in Kingstown, County Dublin

In November 1909, the Ladies Orange Association of Scotland was established. The first Orange warrants were issued to form women's Orange lodges in Scotland.

In 1917, Orangewoman Julia McMordie became the first female member of Belfast City Council. She went on to become the first female high sheriff, and in 1921, became one of the first two female members of the Northern Ireland Parliament, in the founding year of Northern Ireland.

In 1926, Sister Mary S.A. McDonald of a Ladies' Orange Lodge in the Portadown District proposed the creation of a junior women's organisation. The following year, the Junior Orange Women's Association of Ireland was established.

By the 1930s, women's lodges had become a major component of Scottish Orangeism. Historical research indicates that their membership exceeded that of the male lodges in Scotland during this period.

In the 1940s, the Ladies' Orange Benevolent Association of Canada peaked at 27,000 members. The association often supported orphanages and other causes.

In 1953, Orangewoman Patricia Ford became the first female MP from Northern Ireland. She was elected for West Belfast.

In 1955, Orangewoman Patricia McLaughlin became the first female MP from Northern Ireland to win a contested seat.

In 2020, Sister Joan Beggs became the Most Worshipful Grand Mistress of the Loyal Orangewomen of Ireland. She has represented the Orange Order as a public spokeswoman for several events, including Orange Victims Day.

In 2020, the Museum of Orange Heritage launched an "In the Name of Sisterhood" exhibition, to celebrate International Women's Day, which focused on Sister Margaret Drennan, who served as Grand Mistress of Ireland. Margaret was the founder of the first Women's Orange Lodge of Lodge No. 1 in 1912.

In July 2026, a new Junior Orange Lodge for girls was established in Derrygonnelly, County Fermanagh, named Derrygonnelly WLOL No. 179. A ceremony and parade was held in the village, where they were accompanied by Ballyreagh Silver Band and Ballinamallard Accordion Band. The event was attended by Most Worshipful Grand Mistress Joan Beggs.

On 22 September 2026, it was announced that a centenary parade for the Junior Orange Women's Association of Ireland will take place in May 2027, hosted by Portadown.

== Women's National Orange Order Associations ==
Country	Governing Body	Established
Ireland (ROI and NI)	Association of Loyal Orangewomen of Ireland (ALOWI)	1887 (Reformed 1911)
Ireland (ROI and NI)	Junior Orange Women's Association of Ireland	1927
Scotland	Ladies Orange Association of Scotland (LOAS)	1909
England and Wales	Ladies Grand Orange Council of England (LGOCE) / Loyal Institution of Orange Ladies of England (LIOLE)	1960
Canada	Ladies' Orange Benevolent Association of Canada (LOBA)	1894
United States	Ladies' Loyal Orange Association of the United States of America (LLOAUSA)	1876 (Initiated 1906)

Women are fully integrated with the Grand Orange Lodges of Ghana, Togo, Australia and New Zealand.

== Women's Local lodge structure ==
Officer title	Role
Worshipful Mistress (W.M.)	Presides over the lodge and chairs meetings.
Deputy Mistress (D.M.)	Assists the Worshipful Mistress and deputises for her.
Immediate Past Mistress (I.P.M.)	Former Worshipful Mistress who may continue to provide guidance.
Chaplain	Leads prayers and devotional activities.
Secretary	Maintains minutes, records and correspondence.
Treasurer	Manages the lodge's finances.
Committee members	Assist with lodge business and activities.
Tyler	Attends to the lodge entrance and helps maintain the security of meetings.

== Women in the Independent Loyal Orange Institution ==
The Independent Loyal Orange Institution, which is a fraternity that split from the Grand Orange Lodge of Ireland in 1903, operates as mixed-gender lodges. Women can hold officer roles including Worshipful Mistress, Deputy Mistress, Secretary, Treasurer, Committee Women, and Doorwomen (Tylers). Under the ILOI's constitution, female members possess equal voting rights and direct representation at every level of the order, including the right to attend, speak, and vote at the Imperial Grand Lodge. Independent lodges also operate in Scotland, England, Canada, Australia and Argentina.

== Women's Provincial Orange Lodges ==
In Canada, there are three active provincial Orange lodges that oversee local lodges within their province. These are the New Brunswick Ladies Provincial Orange Lodge, Ontario Ladies Provincial Orange Lodge, and the Newfoundland & Labrador Ladies Provincial Orange Lodge.The latter province observes 12 July as a public holiday. Marching bands and Orange members hold a parade for The Twelfth

== Marches ==
Orangewomen participate in annual Orange walks, including the Twelfth of July, Battle of the Somme Commemoration and local parades. A Women's Lodge may hold their own march, accompanied by a marching band, usually to mark an anniversary or for the new year's election of officers.

== Songs ==
The contributions of women in the Orange Order are mentioned in the traditional Ulster Loyalist song "Ladies Orange Lodges O!".

The Orange Maid of Sligo, an Ulster Loyalist song.

== See also ==
- Grand Orange Lodge of Scotland
- Grand Orange Lodge of England
- Orange Order in the Republic of Ireland
- Orange Order in Canada
- Orange Order in the United States
- Orange Order in New Zealand
- Orange Order in Australia
- Orange Order in Africa
- List of Grand Orange Lodges
- Imperial Orange Council
- Royal Arch Purple
- Independent Loyal Orange Institution
