= 1898 North Down by-election =

UK Parliamentary by-election

The North Down by-election of 1898 was held on 7 September 1898. The by-election was held due to the death of the incumbent Irish Unionist Alliance MP, Thomas Waring. It was won by the Irish Unionist Alliance candidate John Blakiston-Houston, who unusually, beat another Irish Unionist Alliance candidate, Thomas Corbett.

== Result ==
1898 North Down by-election
Party	Candidate	Votes	%	±%
Irish Unionist	John Blakiston-Houston	3,381	52.1	N/A
Irish Unionist	Thomas Corbett	3,107	47.9	N/A
Majority		274	4.2	N/A
Turnout		6,488	66.9	N/A
Registered electors		9,702		
Irish Unionist hold		Swing	N/A	
