= 1953 North Down by-election =

UK Parliamentary by-election

The 1953 North Down by-election was held on 15 April 1953. It was held due to the incumbent Ulster Unionist Party MP, Walter Smiles, dying in the sinking of the MV Princess Victoria off the Copeland Islands, in the same storm which caused the North Sea flood of 1953. It was retained by his daughter, Patricia Ford, who was unopposed when she stood as the Unionist candidate. She became the first woman to sit as an Ulster Unionist MP but she stood down in the 1955 general election.

== Result ==
1953 North Down by-election
Party	Candidate	Votes	%	±%
UUP	Patricia Ford	Unopposed		
Registered electors				
UUP hold				
