= Thomas Waring =

Thomas Waring may refer to:

- Thomas Waring (barrister) (1828–1898), Irish barrister and conservative Member of Parliament
- Thomas R. Waring Jr. (1907–1993), American newspaper editor and segregationist
- Tom Waring (1906–1980), English professional association footballer
