= John Blakiston-Houston =

Irish politician (1829–1920)

Member of Parliament for North Down
- In office 7 December 1898 – 24 October 1900
- Preceded by: Thomas Waring
- Succeeded by: Thomas Lorimer Corbett

Personal details
- Born: 11 September 1829
- Died: 27 February 1920 (aged 90)
- Party: Irish Unionist
- Spouse: Marian Streatfield
- Children: 12

John Blakiston-Houston DL JP (11 September 1829 – 27 February 1920) was an Irish Member of Parliament.

Blakiston-Houston was the son of Richard Bayly Blakiston-Houston (d. 1857), of Orangefield, County Down, and his wife Mary Isabella Houston. He was a grandson of Sir Matthew Blakiston, 2nd Baronet. He married Marian Gertrude Streatfield, of Sussex (d. 1890); the couple had twelve children.

John Blakiston-Houston was High Sheriff (1860) and Deputy Lieutenant (D.L.) of County Down. He also held the office of Vice-Lord-Lieutenant of County Down. Between 1898 and 1900 he was the Irish Unionist Member of parliament for North Down at Westminster.

Parliament of the United Kingdom
Preceded by Thomas Waring	Member of Parliament for Down, North; 1898–1900	Succeeded by Thomas Lorimer Corbett
