= 1995 North Down by-election =

UK parliamentary by-election

- 15 June 1995
- Turnout: 38.6% (▼26.9%)
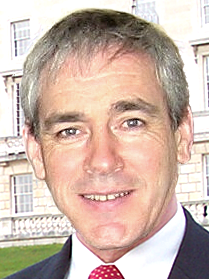

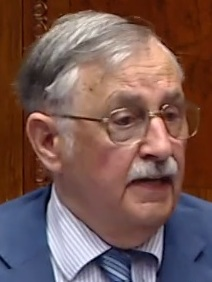
	First party	Second party
	UKUP
Candidate	Robert McCartney	Alan McFarland
Party	UK Unionist	UUP
Popular vote	10,124	7,232
Percentage	37.0%	26.4%
Swing	New	New
	Third party	Fourth party
	APNI
Candidate	Oliver Napier	Alan Chambers
Party	Alliance	Ind. Unionist
Popular vote	6,970	2,170
Percentage	25.4%	7.9%
Swing	▲10.7%	New
MP before election
James Kilfedder
UPUP
Elected MP
Robert McCartney
UK Unionist

The 1995 North Down by-election, in the North Down constituency, was held on 15 June 1995, following the death of James Kilfedder, who had represented the constituency since the 1970 general election. Kilfedder had formed the Ulster Popular Unionist Party in 1980, but the party disintegrated on his death.

== History ==
The North Down constituency was created in 1950, and had consistently returned Unionist MPs with large majorities. It had also seen some of the Alliance Party of Northern Ireland's strongest results, peaking at 22.1% of the vote in the 1983 general election, and in the 1992 general election, it had seen the Conservative Party's best result in Northern Ireland, picking up 32.0% of the vote.

In 1995, North Down was the wealthiest constituency in the province, and had one of the lowest Catholic populations. As a result, neither the Social Democratic and Labour Party nor Sinn Féin, the two parties most closely associated with the Catholic community in Northern Ireland, had regularly stood candidates in the constituency, and neither chose to stand in the by-election.

== Candidates ==
Bob McCartney had stood in the constituency for the Ulster Unionist Party in 1983, when he had come third with 20.3% of the vote. In 1987 he fell out with the party when he refused to withdraw and give Kilfedder a free run on a joint platform of opposition to the Anglo-Irish Agreement, instead running as a "Real Unionist". McCartney now announced his intention to stand in the election, as a UK Unionist. Despite their differences, he gained the tacit backing of the Democratic Unionist Party, who had won only 9.8% of the vote in 1992 and chose not to stand their own candidate.

The Ulster Unionist Party had not run a candidate in North Down since Bob McCartney in 1983, but they believed they were best placed to take Kilfedder's personal vote. They chose to run Alan McFarland, a former Army officer and then Parliamentary secretary to some of their MPs, in preference to Reg Empey, one of their most prominent members. The Alliance Party selected Oliver Napier, their former party leader, hoping his experience and notability would regain some of the votes which they had lost in the 1992 election. The Conservative Party had suffered a dramatic loss of votes in the local elections, and their candidate in the 1992 election had moved away, but they chose Stuart Sexton, a member from Croydon in South London.

Four other candidates stood. Alan Chambers, a local councillor, ran as an independent Unionist. The Natural Law Party stood James Anderson, their leader in Northern Ireland, Michael Brooks who had previously stood as an "Ulster Protestant" candidate in the 1987 Irish general election in Donegal North-East, stood on a platform to "Free Para Lee Clegg Now", and Christopher Carter stood as Ulster's Independent Voice.

The big story of the campaign was from The Guardian, who announced that if McCartney was elected, he would apply for the Labour Party whip, an unusual move for a unionist, who were more usually associated with the Conservatives.

== Result ==
The results gave McCartney a win, which he claimed was a victory for left-right politics, as opposed to sectarian politics, with the Ulster Unionists a disappointed distant second. Shortly after the election, James Molyneaux retired as their leader, and was replaced by David Trimble.

The Alliance came third, with their best ever share of the vote in the constituency. Chambers also saved his deposit, but the Conservatives received what was their worst vote in any UK Parliamentary election since 1918.

The by-election was the first since the Fermanagh and South Tyrone by-election of April 1981 where a seat transferred between two candidates from outside the major parties, and the first since the North Down by-election of 1986 won by a minor party.

1995 North Down by-election
Party	Candidate	Votes	%	±%
UK Unionist	Bob McCartney	10,124	37.0	New
UUP	Alan McFarland	7,232	26.4	New
Alliance	Oliver Napier	6,970	25.4	+10.7
Ind. Unionist	Alan Chambers	2,170	7.9	New
NI Conservatives	Stuart Sexton	583	2.1	−29.9
Free Para Lee Clegg Now	Michael Brooks	108	0.4	New
Independent Voice	Christopher Carter	101	0.4	New
Natural Law	James Anderson	100	0.4	−0.2
Majority		2,892	10.6	N/A
Turnout		27,388	38.6	−26.9
Registered electors		70,872		
UK Unionist gain from UPUP		Swing		

== Previous election ==
General election 1992: North Down
Party	Candidate	Votes	%	±%
UPUP	James Kilfedder	19,305	42.9	−2.2
NI Conservatives	Laurence Kennedy	14,371	32.0	New
Alliance	Addie Morrow	6,611	14.7	−4.7
DUP	Denny Vitty	4,414	9.8	New
Natural Law	Andrew Wilmot	255	0.6	New
Majority		4,934	10.9	+1.2
Turnout		44,956	65.5	+2.7
Registered electors		68,662		
UPUP hold		Swing		
