= Tim Collins (British Army officer) =

Northern Irish military officer (born 1960)

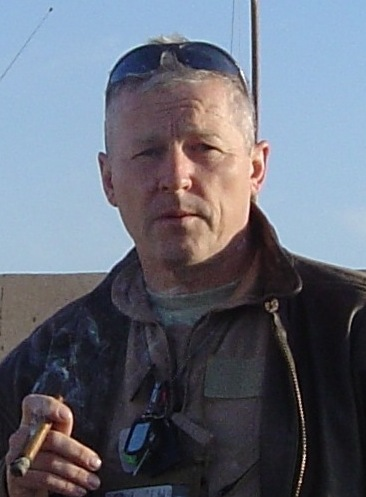
- Collins in 2008
- Born: 30 April 1960 (age 66); Belfast, Northern Ireland
- Military career
- Allegiance: United Kingdom
- Branch: British Army
- Service years: 1981–2004
- Rank: Colonel
- Commands: 1st Battalion, Royal Irish Regiment
- Conflicts: 1st Gulf War, Colombia Drugs War, Zaire Army Rebellion 1991, Bosnia, Kosovo, Iraq War
- Awards: Officer of the Order of the British Empire; Queen's Commendation for Valuable Service

Colonel Timothy Thomas Cyril Collins OBE (born 30 April 1960) is a retired Northern Irish military officer in the British Army. Before the Iraq War in 2003, he gave an eve-of-battle speech which was widely reported. United States President George W. Bush later had a copy of it displayed in the White House's Oval Office. He is the chairman and co-founder of intelligence-based security services company Horus Global. He unsuccessfully stood for the Ulster Unionist Party in the seat of North Down in the 2024 United Kingdom general election.

== Early life ==
Collins was born and raised in Belfast, Northern Ireland, where he grew up during The Troubles. He was educated at the Royal Belfast Academical Institution before attending Queen's University of Belfast, where he gained a degree in economics.

== Military career ==
After graduating from university, Collins was accepted into the Royal Military Academy Sandhurst, from where he was commissioned into the Royal Signals as a second lieutenant on a short service commission on 2 October 1981. He was promoted to lieutenant with seniority from 7 April 1982. He transferred to the Royal Irish Rangers on 18 October 1982. He switched to a full commission on 22 October 1984, and was promoted captain on 7 October 1985.

He passed selection into the SAS in 1988, going on to serve 2 operational tours with the Regiment and 1 tour at HQ Special Forces in York barracks London

He was promoted major on 30 September 1992, and lieutenant-colonel on 30 June 1999. Collins was appointed commanding officer of the 1st Battalion, Royal Irish Regiment in 2001. For a tour of duty in Northern Ireland between October 2001 and March 2002, he was awarded the Queen's Commendation for Valuable Service on 29 October 2002. It was in the capacity of 1 R Irish's commanding officer that he rose to prominence while serving in Iraq.

On 31 October 2003 he was appointed Officer of the Order of the British Empire, for his service in Iraq and was invested on 7 April 2004. Collins was promoted to colonel and moved to the General Staff on 30 June 2003.

He set up the Peace Support College in Sarajevo before becoming DACOS Training at HQ Land Command until his retirement.

=== Eve-of-battle speech ===
As Lieutenant Colonel (Commanding Officer) of the 1st Battalion, Royal Irish Regiment of the British Army, Collins gave a rousing eve-of-battle speech to his troops in Kuwait on Wednesday 19 March 2003. The speech was extemporised, and was recorded in shorthand by a single journalist, Sarah Oliver. No recording or film of the speech exists, Collins told the BBC.

==== Speech excerpt ====
We go to Iraq to liberate not to conquer. We will not fly our flags in their country. We are entering Iraq to free a people and the only flag which will be flown in that ancient land is their own. Show respect for them.

There are some who are alive at this moment who will not be alive shortly. Those who do not wish to go on that journey, we will not send. As for the others I expect you to rock their world. Wipe them out if that is what they choose. But if you are ferocious in battle remember to be magnanimous in victory.

Iraq is steeped in history. It is the site of the Garden of Eden, of the Great Flood and the birthplace of Abraham. Tread lightly there. You will see things that no man could pay to see and you will have to go a long way to find a more decent, generous and upright people than the Iraqis. You will be embarrassed by their hospitality even though they have nothing. Don't treat them as refugees for they are in their own country. Their children will be poor, in years to come they will know that the light of liberation in their lives was brought by you.

If there are casualties of war then remember that when they woke up and got dressed in the morning they did not plan to die this day. Allow them dignity in death. Bury them properly and mark their graves.

It is my foremost intention to bring every single one of you out alive but there may be people among us who will not see the end of this campaign. We will put them in their sleeping bags and send them back. There will be no time for sorrow.

The enemy should be in no doubt that we are his nemesis and that we are bringing about his rightful destruction. There are many regional commanders who have stains on their souls and they are stoking the fires of hell for Saddam. He and his forces will be destroyed by this coalition for what they have done. As they die they will know their deeds have brought them to this place. Show them no pity.

It is a big step to take another human life. It is not to be done lightly. I know of men who have taken life needlessly in other conflicts, I can assure you they live with the Mark of Cain upon them. If someone surrenders to you then remember they have that right in international law and ensure that one day they go home to their family.

The ones who wish to fight, well, we aim to please.

If you harm the regiment or its history by over-enthusiasm in killing or in cowardice, know it is your family who will suffer. You will be shunned unless your conduct is of the highest for your deeds will follow you down through history. We will bring shame on neither our uniform or our nation.

[Regarding the use by Saddam of chemical or biological weapons] It is not a question of if, it's a question of when. We know he has already devolved the decision to lower commanders, and that means he has already taken the decision himself. If we survive the first strike we will survive the attack.

As for ourselves, let's bring everyone home and leave Iraq a better place for us having been there.

Our business now is north.

==== In popular culture ====
The "Mark of Cain" line from the speech inspired the title of the 2007 Film4 Productions drama The Mark of Cain. In the film a commanding officer makes a speech based on Collins' to his men. Collins would disavow the film after a planned broadcast date of 5 April 2007 coincided with the 2007 Iranian seizure of Royal Navy personnel.

The last episode of the 2008 television series 10 Days to War features a version of the speech performed by Kenneth Branagh as Collins.

=== Accusations of detainee mistreatment ===
In 2003, Collins was accused by Major Re Biastre of the US Army's 402nd Civil Affairs Battalion of mistreating Iraqi detainees. In Biastre's allegations, he stated that he had never seen any of the alleged mistreatment personally, but had instead overheard them being discussed by British and American military personnel. The Royal Military Police (RMP) opened an investigation into Biastre's claims, during which it found that Biastre had been verbally reprimanded by Collins and made to stand at attention for 45 minutes for distributing sweets to Iraqi children against explicit orders not to do so. The allegations were denounced by USMC Major Stan Coerr, who stated in an interview that "I didn’t see any of these incidents and I don’t for a second believe them. The fact is that this whole thing was started by an incompetent officer lashing out at someone who embarrassed him in front of his troops." Several Royal Irish Regiment soldiers who had served under Collins signed testimonies supporting his refutations of Biastre's allegations. In September 2003, the Ministry of Defence announced that the RMP investigation had concluded that Collins was innocent of all charges and would not be prosecuted. Collins subsequently sued the Sunday Mirror in the High Court of Northern Ireland for libel over their reporting of the allegations, winning a substantial amount of undisclosed damages from them. After Collins' court victory, his solicitor Ernie Telford stated that the allegations "have caused immense distress to my client, his wife and children."

== Post-military career ==
He officially left the British Army on 5 August 2004.

=== Media appearances ===
Since leaving the Army, Collins' views on the Iraq conflict and other military issues have been widely sought. In 2007, Collins was host of a three-part documentary called "Ships That Changed the World" for BBC Northern Ireland. In December 2008 – during an interview on the BBC's Today programme, Collins said that, when he left in 2004, the British Army was already undermanned for existing commitments. In February 2011 Tim Collins appeared on the BBC news programme Panorama in a special entitled 'Forgotten Heroes'. In the documentary, Collins meets veterans struggling to cope with civilian life and sleeps rough on the streets of Brighton with another former soldier.

=== Politics ===
During the 2005 Ulster Unionist leadership election he was cited by a number of prominent Ulster Unionists as an outside figure who would make a good leader, but Collins declined as he felt he had "no experience of politics." Collins is a signatory of the founding statement of principles of the Henry Jackson Society, which advocates a pro-active approach to the spread of liberal democracy through the world. He has recently been critical of the Iraq war: "the UK and US pour blood and treasure into overseas campaigns which seem to have no ending and no goal ... Clearly I was naive".

In December 2011, it was revealed that Collins was approached to stand as an elected police and crime commissioner for the Conservative Party in Kent and originally was standing, however he later dropped out of the race. In August 2014, Collins was one of 200 public figures who were signatories to a letter to The Guardian opposing Scottish independence in the run-up to September's referendum on that issue.

Collins had been approached by both the Conservative Party and the Ulster Unionist Party (UUP) to run for Parliament. In January 2024, Collins confirmed that he would run for the UUP in the 2024 United Kingdom general election. He said that it was the right time to for a new career path, and he chose to run for the UUP because their views and values are compatible with his own. The Democratic Unionist Party previously asked Collins to run for them but he turned down the offer. He contested the North Down constituency and made controversial statements regarding the cost of insuring his Rolls-Royce. He finished third with 15.6% of the vote, and attributed his loss to voters being more interested in "potholes and hedges" than international affairs.

=== Business career ===
Collins is chairman of specialist security company, Horus Global.

== Works ==
- Collins, Tim (2006). Rules of Engagement. London: Review. ISBN 978-0-7553-1375-4. OCLC 62796448.
