= George Currie (Northern Irish politician) =

Northern Ireland politician (1905–1978)

George Currie MBE

Member of Parliament for North Down
- In office 26 May 1955 – 29 May 1970
- Preceded by: Patricia Ford
- Succeeded by: James Kilfedder

Personal details
- Born: 19 December 1905 Belfast, Ireland
- Died: 20 January 1978 (aged 72)
- Party: Ulster Unionist Party
- Education: Trinity College Dublin; Middle Temple
- Profession: Barrister

George Boyle Hanna Currie MBE (19 December 1905 – 20 January 1978) was a Northern Irish barrister and politician.

Currie went to Campbell College, Belfast, followed by Trinity College Dublin where he earned the degrees of Bachelor of Arts, Master of Arts, and Bachelor of Laws. He was called to the English Bar by the Middle Temple in 1932, and practiced on the Northern circuit based in Liverpool.

With an interest in politics, Currie was elected to Wirral Urban District Council in 1934 and served until 1950 including as Chairman of the Council in 1938–39. During the Second World War he served with the Royal Air Force Volunteer Reserve and was on the staff of Lord Dowding at RAF Fighter Command, later switching to the legal branch.

At the 1950 general election Currie fought as Conservative candidate for East Flintshire, a safe Labour seat. He fought this seat again in the 1951 election.

He was then selected for North Down where the sitting Ulster Unionist MP Patricia Ford was retiring after only two years. He won the seat in May 1955 and on 19 December made his maiden speech in a debate on the White Fish Subsidy (United Kingdom) No. 2 Scheme.

Currie easily kept the seat which he represented for fifteen years before himself retiring at the 1970 general election. His successor was James Kilfedder former West Belfast MP.

Parliament of the United Kingdom
Preceded by Patricia Ford	Member of Parliament for North Down; 1955–1970	Succeeded by James Kilfedder
