= Roselawn Cemetery =

Cemetery in Belfast, County Down, Northern Ireland

Coordinates: 54°33′35″N 5°51′23″W

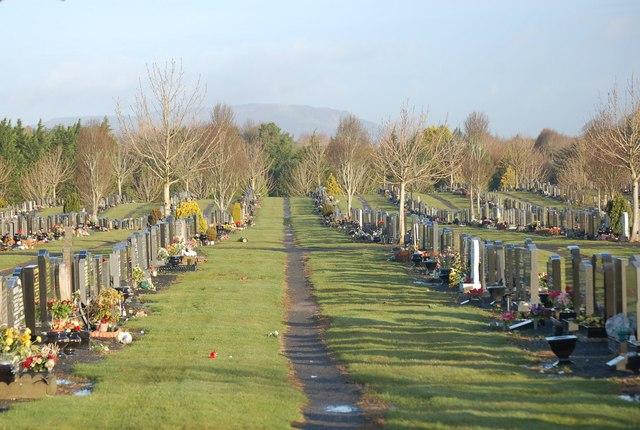
- Interactive map of Roselawn Cemetery

Details
- Established: 1954
- Location: Crossnacreevy, Belfast
- Country: Northern Ireland, UK
- Type: Public
- Owned by: Belfast City Council
- No. of interments: >50,000
- Website: Official website
- Find a Grave: Roselawn Cemetery

Roselawn Cemetery is a large cemetery and crematorium on the outskirts of Belfast in Northern Ireland. It opened in 1954. It is owned and operated by Belfast City Council. It is located on the Ballygowan Road.

== History ==
Roselawn Cemetery was laid out in 1952 as a ‘lawn’ cemetery and the ground was formally consecrated in 1954. Roses (traditional flowering shrubs, used extensively in cemeteries) were planted along the main driveway, giving the site its name. In 1961, the City of Belfast Crematorium, the first of its kind in Northern Ireland, opened its doors, with the first cremation taking place in July 1961. Land has been added over the years, and the site has been landscaped with lakes to make it more appealing to visitors. The surface area has been estimated at a little less than 300 acres, which would make it the largest municipal cemetery in the United Kingdom.

The cemetery contains the remains of an ancient ráth or ringfort, which is believed to be from the Iron Age or early Christian period.

== Notable interments ==
It has been estimated that there are between 43,000 and 44,000 memorial plaques. The site contains graves connected to the Troubles, including those of police and prison officers, soldiers and victims of the Abercorn Restaurant, Oxford Street and La Mon House Hotel bombings.

- Ian Adamson, Northern Ireland politician
- George Best, Northern Ireland professional football player
- May Blood, Baroness Blood, British politician
- George Cassidy, Northern Ireland jazz musician
- David Ervine, Northern Ireland Unionist politician and leader of the Progressive Unionist Party (PUP).
- B. J. Hogg, actor
- James Kilfedder, Northern Ireland unionist politician
- Helen Lewis, Czechoslovak-born Northern Ireland choreographer and Holocaust survivor

Cremations

- Basil Brooke, 1st Viscount Brookeborough, soldier and Ulster Unionist Party (UUP) politician, third Prime Minister of Northern Ireland. The ashes were scattered on his estate.
