= Robert John White =

Robert White
- John White at the Ulster Unionist Party Executive Committee during the Leader's address.

President of the Ulster Unionist Party
- In office 2006–2008
- Leader: Reg Empey
- Preceded by: Lord Rogan
- Succeeded by: Office abolished

Member of the Northern Ireland Forum for East Londonderry
- In office 30 May 1996 – 25 April 1998

Mayor of Coleraine
- In office 1977–1980
- Preceded by: A.N. Clarke
- Succeeded by: G.A. Mcllrath

Member of Coleraine Borough Council
- In office 19 May 1993 – 21 May 1997
- Preceded by: District created
- Succeeded by: David Barbour
- Constituency: Coleraine Central
- In office 15 May 1985 – 19 May 1993
- Preceded by: District created
- Succeeded by: District abolished
- Constituency: Coleraine Town
- In office 30 May 1973 – 15 May 1985
- Preceded by: Council created
- Succeeded by: District abolished
- Constituency: Coleraine Area C

Personal details
- Born: Coleraine, Northern Ireland
- Political party: Ulster Unionist

Robert John White, known as John White, is an Ulster Unionist politician in Northern Ireland.

== Political career ==
White was Mayor of Coleraine from 1977 to 1980, having been Deputy Mayor from 1973. He was elected to the council at every election from 1968 to 1993.

In 1996 he was elected to the Northern Ireland Forum for East Londonderry. He supported the Belfast Agreement in 1998. In 2006 he succeeded Lord Rogan as UUP President unopposed at the Party AGM.

Northern Ireland Forum
New forum	Member for East Londonderry; 1996–1998	Forum dissolved
Party political offices
Preceded by Lord Rogan	President of the Ulster Unionist Party; 2006–2008	Vacant Office merged with that of Chairman Title next held by David Campbell as Chairman of the UUP
Preceded by Lord Rogan	President of the Ulster Unionist Party; 2006–2008	Recreated Title next held by May Steele as Honorary President
Civic offices
Preceded by A N Clarke	Mayor of Coleraine; 1977–1980	Succeeded by G A McIlrath
