= Ulster Conservatives and Unionists =

2009–12 electoral alliance

- Ulster Unionist Leader: Sir Reg Empey MLA (2009-10); Tom Elliott MLA (2010-12)
- Conservative Leader: David Cameron MP (2009-12)
- Founded: 2009
- Dissolved: 2012
- Ideology: British unionism; Conservatism; Economic liberalism
- Political position: Centre-right
- European Parliament group: European Conservatives and Reformists
- International affiliation: International Democrat Union
- Colours: Light blue
- Member parties: Ulster Unionist Party; Conservative Party

Website
- www.voteforchangeni.com

The Ulster Conservatives and Unionists, officially registered as the Ulster Conservatives and Unionists – New Force (UCUNF), was an electoral alliance in Northern Ireland between the Ulster Unionist Party (UUP) and the Conservative Party.

== 2009 European Parliament campaign ==
The alliance was launched in 2009. Conservatives and Unionists candidates were first selected for the 2009 European Parliament election. The first candidate to stand for election using this description was Ulster Unionist Jim Nicholson, who polled 82,893 votes, 17.0% of the total, and was elected as a Member of the European Parliament (MEP).

== 2010 UK general election campaign ==
On 24 February 2010, the alliance announced 9 of the 18 candidates who were to run in the 2010 United Kingdom general election. The UUP's sole Member of Parliament (MP) from the 2005 general election, Sylvia, Lady Hermon for North Down, had expressed public dissatisfaction with the arrangement since early 2009, and left the UUP in March 2010, deciding to contest the forthcoming general election as an independent. As such, the alliance had no incumbent MPs. On 7 April 2010 the candidate for Fermanagh and South Tyrone, Tom Elliott, withdrew in favour of Independent Rodney Connor, leaving that constituency without a Unionist Party candidate.

'As things stand, Northern Ireland MPs need to be involved in decisions about their lives that are not devolved. I want the most talented people to form my government and that will mean people from all corners of the UK. Why are there great Ulstermen and women on our television screens, in our boardrooms and in our military but not in our Cabinet? The semi-detached status of Northern Ireland politics needs to end. This is not true representative democracy and it has got to change.'

— David Cameron

The Conservative and UUP alliance failed to gain any seats in the election. The UUP lost their only seat in North Down to Hermon's independent campaign, and Connor also lost Fermanagh and South Tyrone. Across Northern Ireland, the joint share of the vote was 15.2%.

== End of the alliance ==
After failed calls for the UUP to disband and join the Conservatives, the Conservatives in Northern Ireland were relaunched as NI Conservatives on 14 June 2012.

In October 2023, Ulster Unionist leader Doug Beattie attended Conservative Party conference in Manchester.

== Electoral results ==
=== European Parliament ===
Election	First Preference Vote	Vote %	Seats
2009	82,892	17.0%	1 / 3

=== Westminster ===
Election	House of Commons	Share of votes	Seats	+/-	Outcome
2010	55th	15.2%	0 / 18	▼1	No seats

=== Stormont ===
Election	Body	First preference votes	Vote %	Seats	Outcome
2011	4th Assembly	87,531	13.2%	16 / 108	Coalition
