= Reg Empey =

Northern Ireland politician (born 1947)

The Right Honourable The Lord Empey OBE
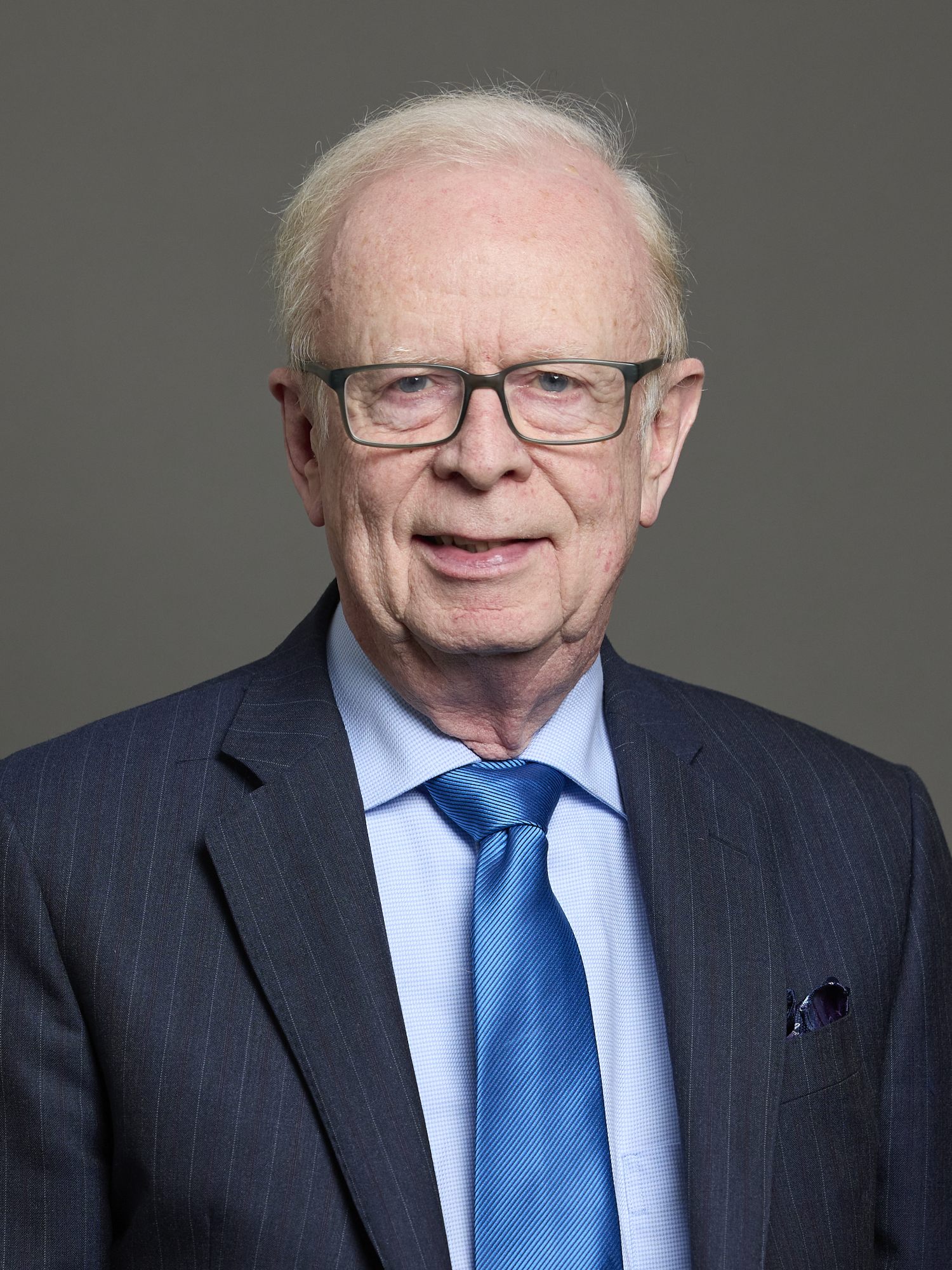
- Official portrait, 2025

First Minister of Northern Ireland
- Acting
- In office 1 July 2001 – 6 November 2001 Serving with Seamus Mallon
- Appointed by: David Trimble
- Preceded by: David Trimble
- Succeeded by: David Trimble
Party offices
Chairman of the Ulster Unionist Party
In office 1 April 2012 – 23 December 2019
Leader	Mike Nesbitt; Robin Swann; Steve Aiken
Preceded by	David Campbell
Succeeded by	Danny Kennedy
13th Leader of the Ulster Unionist Party
In office 24 June 2005 – 22 September 2010
Deputy	Danny Kennedy
Chairman	David Campbell
President	The Lord Rogan; John White
Preceded by	David Trimble
Succeeded by	Tom Elliott
United Ulster Unionist Party
1977–1984	Deputy Leader
Vanguard Progressive Unionist Party
1974–1975	Chairman
Ministerial offices
Minister for Employment and Learning
In office 8 May 2007 – 27 October 2010
Preceded by	Carmel Hanna
Succeeded by	Danny Kennedy
Minister of Enterprise, Trade and Investment
In office 1 July 1998 – 14 October 2002
Preceded by	Office established
Succeeded by	Nigel Dodds
Local government offices
46th and 50th Lord Mayor of Belfast
In office 1 June 1993 – 1 June 1994
Deputy	Hugh Smyth
Preceded by	Herbert Ditty
Succeeded by	Hugh Smyth
In office 1 June 1989 – 1 June 1990
Deputy	vacant
Preceded by	Nigel Dodds
Succeeded by	Fred Cobain
9th Deputy Lord Mayor of Belfast
In office 1 June 1988 – 1 June 1989
Lord Mayor	Nigel Dodds
Preceded by	Dixie Gilmore (1987)
Succeeded by	Eric Smyth (1990)
Member of Belfast City Council
In office 17 May 1985 – 5 May 2011
Constituency	Pottinger
Preceded by	Office established
Succeeded by	Niall Ó Donnghaile
Parliamentary offices
Member of the House of Lords
Lord Temporal
Life peerage 15 January 2011
Member of the Legislative Assembly
In office 25 June 1998 – 5 May 2011
Constituency	Belfast East
Preceded by	Office established
Succeeded by	Michael Copeland
Member of the Northern Ireland Forum
In office 30 May 1996 – 25 April 1998
Constituency	Belfast East
Preceded by	Office established
Succeeded by	Office abolished
Member of the Northern Ireland Constitutional Convention
In office 1 May 1975 – 6 March 1976
Constituency	Belfast East
Preceded by	Office established
Succeeded by	Office abolished

Personal details
- Born: Reginald Norman Morgan Empey; 26 October 1947 (age 79) Belfast, Northern Ireland
- Party: Ulster Unionist Party (Before 1973; 1984–2011; 2011-)
- Other political affiliations: Ulster Vanguard (1973–1975); United Ulster Unionist Party (1975–1984); Conservatives (2011)
- Spouse: Stella Empey (died 2023)
- Children: 2
- Education: Queen's University Belfast
- Profession: Businessman

Reginald Norman Morgan Empey, Baron Empey, OBE (born 26 October 1947), best known as Reg Empey, is a Northern Irish politician who served as the acting First Minister of Northern Ireland in 2001. He was the leader of the Ulster Unionist Party (UUP) from 2005 to 2010 and served as chairman of the party from 2012 to 2019. Empey was a Member of the Northern Ireland Assembly (MLA) for East Belfast from 1998 to 2011 and has been a life peer in the House of Lords since 2011.

== Early life and career ==
Reg Empey was born in West Belfast on 26 October 1947. His family were retailers, and his uncle was Stormont Ulster Unionist MP Joseph Morgan; another uncle was Ben Horan, who was a Belfast councillor for over 20 years. Empey attended Hillcrest Preparatory School, Belfast, and The Royal School, Armagh, before graduating with an economics degree from Queen's University of Belfast, where his contemporaries included the future MP Bernadette Devlin. After that he built up a business career, specifically in retailing. His Royal Avenue store, located opposite the British Army barracks, was destroyed in an explosion, and looted.

He first entered politics in the late 1960s when he joined the Ulster Young Unionist Council. Along with other hardline unionists, he left in protest at reforms and became an early member of the Vanguard Progressive Unionist Party, serving as the party chairman in 1975 and being elected to the Constitutional Convention in the same year.

When Vanguard split during the Northern Ireland Constitutional Convention, Empey joined the breakaway group which formed the United Ulster Unionist Party, serving as the party's deputy leader from 1977 until its dissolution in 1984.

== Political career ==
=== Ulster Unionist Party ===
Empey then rejoined the Ulster Unionist Party (UUP). He was elected to Belfast City Council, serving as Lord Mayor in 1989–1990 and 1993–1994.

He was appointed an Officer of the Order of the British Empire (OBE) in the 1994 New Year Honours for services to local government.

During this period Empey built up a political base in East Belfast, but in 1995 he sought to become the Ulster Unionists' candidate for the North Down by-election. He was not selected by North Down party members, losing out to Alan McFarland.

He was a senior Ulster Unionist negotiator for the Good Friday Agreement.

Empey became increasingly prominent in the UUP and was often a member of its negotiating teams throughout the 1990s, the decade when he first became a party officer, and he became a key ally of David Trimble, who became leader of the party in 1995. Trimble had been deputy leader of Vanguard in the years after the divide. In 1996, Empey was elected to the Northern Ireland Forum for East Belfast and in 1998 and 2003 he was elected to the Northern Ireland Assembly.

Reg Empey and John White at the Ulster Unionist Party Executive Committee during the Leader's address. In the foreground Roy Beggs is seen

=== Executive career (1998–2010) ===
When the Northern Ireland Executive was formed in 1999, Empey became Minister of Enterprise, Trade and Investment, holding the portfolio throughout the entirety of the Executive's existence. In June 2001 Trimble temporarily resigned as First Minister of Northern Ireland and appointed Empey to fulfil the functions of the office for the interim period until disagreements between the parties had been resolved. He undertook the role until November of that year. In 1999, Empey was knighted by Queen Elizabeth II.

He was the Minister for Employment and Learning from 2007 to 2010. He called for the Treasury to compensate investors in the collapsed mutual society Presbyterian Mutual which the Treasury rejected.

In October 2011, he welcomed the news that the National Transitional Council of Libya had agreed compensate victims of IRA bombings. He said the many shipments of arms sent to Ireland by Colonel Gaddafi for IRA use, were 'tantamount to an act of war against the United Kingdom.'

=== Leadership (2005–10) ===
In 2005, Trimble resigned as leader following a disastrous showing by the UUP in the 2005 general election. Empey stood in the contest to succeed him and on 24 June 2005, was elected. In a reversal of fortunes, his main opponent was Alan McFarland, to whom he had lost the by-election nomination ten years earlier.

On 15 May 2010, Empey announced that he was to stand down in late 2010 as leader of the Ulster Unionist Party. In August 2010, he confirmed that he would resign as leader in September 2010.

=== House of Lords (2011–present) ===
On 19 November 2010, it was announced that Empey would be created a life peer and will sit as a Conservative in the House of Lords. On 15 January 2011, he was created Baron Empey, of Shandon in the City and County Borough of Belfast, and took his seat supported by Lord Trimble and Lord Rogan.

Empey voted in favour of triggering Article 50 in 2017, to begin the United Kingdom's withdrawal from the European Union. He has since stated that "Brexit has been a disaster for unionism."

On 30 October 2024, Empey called on Democratic Unionist Party (DUP) leader Gavin Robinson to apologise on behalf of his party after it emerged that the DUP had secret meetings with Sinn Féin in the mid-2000s whenever the DUP had a policy of not speaking to Sinn Féin.

== First Minister of Northern Ireland (2001) ==
On 30 June 2001 David Trimble temporarily resigned as First Minister of Northern Ireland at midnight and appointed Empey to fulfil the functions of the office for the interim period until disagreements between the parties over decommissioning had been resolved. Trimble had resigned in protest against the IRA failure to redeem its pledge to put its weapons "completely and verifiably beyond use". Empey was one of Trimble's strongest supporters.

As alluded to above, Empey's premiership was marked by the continuing impasse arising from the Provisional Irish Republican Army (IRA)'s refusal of Trimble's demands that it decommission its arms, as per the commitments all parties had signed up to in section 7 pt. 3 (page 25) of the 1998 Good Friday Agreement.

On 7 August 2001, the IRA agreed on a method of destroying its arsenal. Tony Blair, Prime Minister of the United Kingdom at the time, described the breakthrough as "significant" and "historic". General John de Chastelain of Canada, chairman of the Independent International Commission on Decommissioning, said the proposals had been accepted by the panel as ones that would "put IRA arms completely and verifiably beyond use." The Ulster Unionists had said they would no longer take part in the Northern Ireland Assembly if the IRA did not begin disarming. The announcement came after meetings between the commission and a representative of the IRA.

Empey and the UUP's two other ministers in the Northern Ireland Executive resigned from their ministerial positions on 18 October 2001, putting a seven-day deadline on solving the crisis before being renominated on 24 October 2001.

On 2 November 2001, he proposed a motion ‘That the Rt Hon David Trimble, MP, MLA be First Minister and that Mr Mark Durkan, MLA be Deputy First Minister of the Assembly’, but it was defeated after two members of Trimble's party voted against him. Therefore, Empey continued as First Minister until Trimble was finally elected on 6 November in another motion proposed by Empey. The motion succeeded after three Alliance MLAs changed their designation temporarily from 'Other' to 'Unionist'.

In July 2025, declassified confidential government files revealed that if Trimble resigned as UUP leader in February 2002 there was support for Empey becoming the permanent First Minister with Jeffrey Donaldson having responsibility for party leadership and organisation.

== Personal life ==
Reg and Stella Empey have two children. Empey is a member of the Orange Order, his lodge being Eldon LOL 7, in the Belfast district. Lady Empey was appointed MBE in the 2007 New Year Honours for services to the community in Northern Ireland and died in 2023.

== Electoral history ==
Empey first stood for election in the 1975 elections to the Constitutional Convention, standing as a candidate in Belfast East for the Vanguard Unionist Progressive Party he received 4657 first preference votes he was elected. In the 1977 Local Government elections he received 981 first preference votes and was unsuccessful (he did not run in the 1981 Local Government Elections), and the 1982 Assembly election he received 503 first preference votes.

In the 1985 Local Government election, he was elected to Belfast City Council with 1117 first preference votes, this was reduced in the subsequent 1989 local government election to 864.

In 1993 he was elected having attained 1295 first preference votes, and was elected again in 1997 with 2309 first preference votes. However this still left him behind his main DUP rival in the Pottinger Electoral Area, Sammy Wilson.

Empey stood in every election since 1998 to the devolved Northern Ireland Assembly until the 2011 election. He was first elected to the Assembly in 1998 polling 12.8% of the popular vote, in 2003, 20.9% of the popular vote, and in 2007, 14% of the popular vote. Empey also stood against DUP MP for East Belfast Peter Robinson in the 2005 Westminster election polling 30.1% of the vote but failing to get elected.

In the 2010 general election, Empey contested the South Antrim seat, but was defeated by the incumbent William McCrea for the DUP.

Civic offices
Vacant Title last held by Dixie Gilmore	Deputy Lord Mayor of Belfast; 1988–1989	Vacant Title next held by Eric Smyth
Preceded by Nigel Dodds	Lord Mayor of Belfast; 1989–1990	Succeeded by Fred Cobain
Preceded by Herbert Ditty	Lord Mayor of Belfast; 1993–1994	Succeeded by Hugh Smyth
Northern Ireland Constitutional Convention
New convention	Member for East Belfast; 1975–1976	Convention dissolved
Northern Ireland Forum
New forum	Member for East Belfast; 1996–1998	Forum dissolved
Northern Ireland Assembly
New assembly Good Friday Agreement	Member of the Legislative Assembly for Belfast East; 1998–2002	Succeeded by Michael Copeland
Political offices
New office Good Friday Agreement	Minister of Enterprise, Trade and Investment; 1998–2002	Vacant Office suspended Title next held by Nigel Dodds
Vacant Office suspended Title last held by Carmel Hanna	Minister for Employment and Learning; 2007–2010	Succeeded by Danny Kennedy
Party political offices
Preceded by David Trimble	Leader of the Ulster Unionist Party; 2005–2010	Succeeded by Tom Elliott
Preceded by David Campbell	Chairman of the Ulster Unionist Party; 2012–2019	Succeeded by Danny Kennedy
Orders of precedence in the United Kingdom
Preceded by The Lord Wood of Anfield	Gentlemen; Baron Empey	Followed by The Lord Palmer of Childs Hill
