= Alan McFarland =

Northern Irish politician (born 1949)

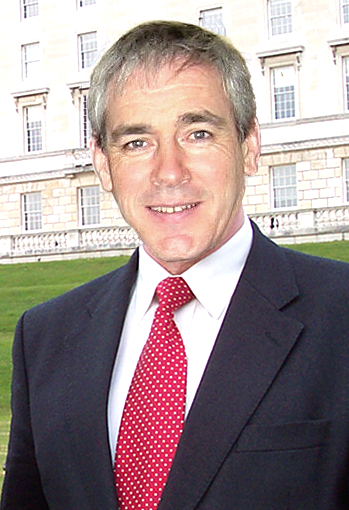

Member of the Legislative Assembly for North Down
- In office 25 June 1998 – 5 May 2011
- Preceded by: New Creation
- Succeeded by: Gordon Dunne

Northern Ireland Forum Member for North Down
- In office 30 May 1996 – 25 April 1998
- Preceded by: New forum
- Succeeded by: Forum dissolved

Personal details
- Born: 9 August 1949 (age 76) Plumbridge, Northern Ireland
- Party: Independent Unionist (from 2010)
- Other political affiliations: Ulster Unionist Party (until 2010)

Major Robert Alan McFarland (born 9 August 1949 in Plumbridge, County Tyrone) is a former Northern Irish unionist politician who was a Member of the Legislative Assembly (MLA) for North Down from 1998 to 2011.

Formerly a member of the Ulster Unionist Party (UUP), McFarland resigned from the party in 2010, following the agreed pact between the UUP and the Conservative Party ahead of the general election that year.

== Background ==
He attended Rockport School near Holywood and Campbell College in east Belfast. After a short career in banking he was admitted to the Royal Military Academy Sandhurst and was commissioned into the Royal Tank Regiment in 1974. He is also a member of Mensa.

He retired from the Army in 1992 with the rank of major and became a Parliamentary Assistant to James Molyneaux MP and the Rev. Martin Smyth MP.

=== Political career ===
In 1995, he was selected by the Ulster Unionists to contest the North Down by-election over the favourite for the nomination, Sir Reg Empey, but was beaten in the election by Robert McCartney. He was again beaten by McCartney in the 1997 general election, but by a narrower margin.

In 1996, he was elected to the Northern Ireland Forum for Political Dialogue for North Down and was involved in the talks process that resulted in the Belfast Agreement of 1998. He was one of three UUP members returned to the Assembly for North Down in the first elections to the body in 1998 and he retained his seat in the November 2003 election and March 2007 election.

He was, until reconstitution in 2006, one of the UUP representatives on the Northern Ireland Policing Board.

Following the resignation of David Trimble as UUP leader in 2005 he stood as a candidate in the contest to succeed him and was narrowly beaten by Sir Reg Empey. Sir Reg appointed McFarland as the party's chief negotiator following the election, in which role McFarland served through the period before restoration of devolution in Northern Ireland.

In 2007, following the restoration of devolution the details of a row between McFarland and Empey were leaked to the press. It is believed that McFarland turned down the nomination to be Minister of Health when he discovered that Empey planned to take the UUP's other ministerial portfolio himself, insisting that the party leader should concentrate on rebuilding the party from outside the Northern Ireland Executive. Empey did not back down from his stance and appointed Michael McGimpsey to the Department of Health instead.

=== Resignation from the Ulster Unionist Party ===
McFarland announced his resignation from the Ulster Unionist Party on 30 March 2010, five days after the resignation by North Down MP Lady Sylvia Hermon (also formerly UUP), citing his disagreement with the UUP electoral pact with the Conservative Party. He made his intentions clear to continue to sit as an independent in the Assembly.

In the 2011 Assembly Election, McFarland lost his seat.

Northern Ireland Forum
New forum	Member for North Down; 1996–1998	Forum dissolved
Northern Ireland Assembly
New assembly	MLA for North Down; 1998–2011	Succeeded by Gordon Dunne
