= Sylvia Hermon =

British politician (born 1955)

Lady Hermon
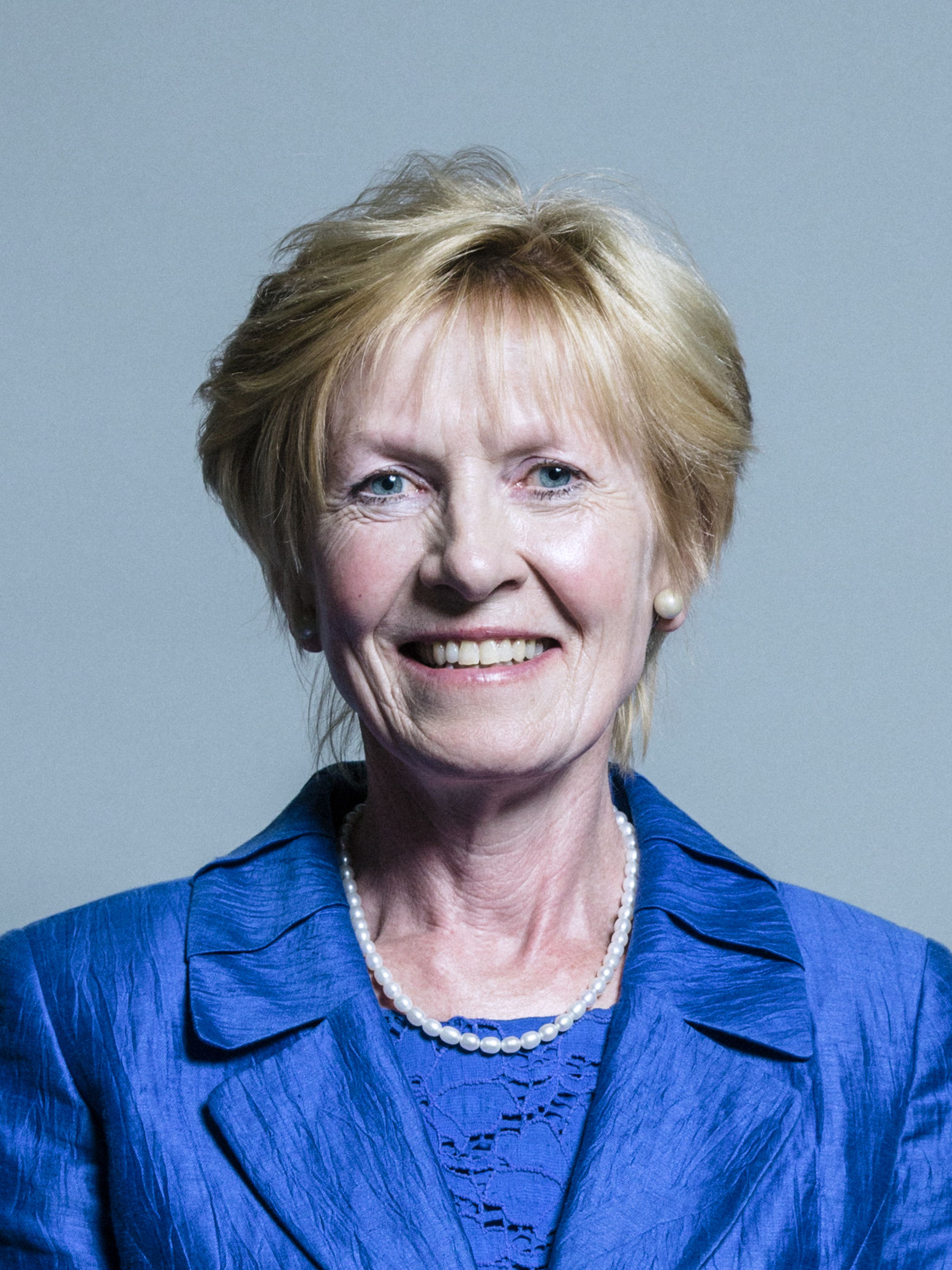
- Official portrait, 2017

Member of Parliament for North Down
- In office 7 June 2001 – 6 November 2019
- Preceded by: Robert McCartney
- Succeeded by: Stephen Farry

Personal details
- Born: Sylvia Eileen Paisley; 11 August 1955 (age 71) Galbally, County Tyrone, Northern Ireland
- Party: Independent Unionist (2010–2019)
- Other political affiliations: UUP (1998–2010)
- Spouse: Sir Jack Hermon
- Children: 2
- Education: Aberystwyth University; The College of Law
- Profession: Law lecturer, politician

Sylvia Eileen, Lady Hermon (née Paisley; born 11 August 1955) is a retired Unionist politician from Northern Ireland. She served as the Member of Parliament (MP) for the constituency of North Down from 2001 to 2019.

She was first elected for the Ulster Unionist Party (UUP), but left the party in 2010, sitting as an Independent unionist for the rest of her time as Member of Parliament. She is the widow of Sir Jack Hermon, who served as Chief Constable of the Royal Ulster Constabulary. She was the only independent MP elected at the 2010 general election, 2015 general election and 2017 general election.

On 25 March 2010, Lady Hermon announced her resignation from the Ulster Unionist Party, and had served since then as an independent MP. Her decision was triggered by the Ulster Unionist alliance with the Conservative Party. She successfully retained her seat in the 2010 election with a large gain in her share of the vote, increasing her majority, retaining the seat again in the 2015 election. She also retained her seat in 2017 with a reduced 41% of the vote.

She announced her decision not to contest her seat at the December 2019 general election in November 2019.

== Background ==
Born Sylvia Eileen Paisley, a Presbyterian in the mainly Republican area of Galbally, County Tyrone, her father was Robert Paisley, a farmer, and she had three sisters. Hermon's mother accidentally drowned when Hermon was four. She went to Dungannon High School before studying law at the University of Wales, Aberystwyth.

She lectured in law at the Queen's University of Belfast at the same time as David Trimble. She did not enter politics until 1998, when she joined the Ulster Unionist Party, having been impressed by the role the party had played in negotiating the Good Friday Agreement.

On 6 November 2008, her husband Sir John Hermon died. Shortly afterward, her father also died.

She is a long-standing supporter of the Alzheimer's Research Trust and helped launch its Northern Ireland network centre.

== Political career ==
Within the UUP, Hermon was regarded as being on the more socially liberal wing of the party, being characterised in The Guardian in 2005 as a 'liberal'. She was chosen as UUP candidate for the North Down constituency to contest the 2001 general election, and defeated the incumbent Robert McCartney of the UK Unionist Party by over 7,000 votes. During the election she gained the support of the local branch of the Alliance Party of Northern Ireland, who withdrew their own candidate.

Hermon became chair of the North Down branch of the UUP in 2001 and held this position until 2003. In 2001 she was also appointed UUP spokesperson for Youth and Women's Issues, Home Affairs and Trade and Industry. She subsequently lost the Trade and Industry portfolio and took responsibility for Culture, Media and Sport in 2002. Outside of the UUP, Hermon has also been involved in policing support and pensioners' rights campaigns.

In 2003, she voted in favour of the Iraq War.

Hermon was the only Ulster Unionist to be returned to Westminster in the 2005 general election and as a result figured in consideration for who would succeed David Trimble as party leader. Initially considered to be amongst the frontrunners, Hermon eventually declined the opportunity, feeling that she could not combine it with her responsibility of caring for her husband, who suffered from Alzheimer's disease, and instead supported the unsuccessful bid of Alan McFarland.

In 2009, Hermon announced her opposition to the Ulster Unionist link-up with the Conservative Party. She declared, in an unplanned announcement, during an interview in her constituency office,

At the present time, I can't see myself standing under a Conservative banner ... If my party chooses to move to call themselves by a different name, I'm terribly sorry and terribly disappointed by that but I remain an Ulster Unionist. That was certainly my mandate and I've loved serving the people of North Down. They have stood by me through the most difficult of times and if they choose and wish me to serve them I would do my very best to do that.

On 23 February 2010, Hermon confirmed that she would not be seeking the nomination as a Conservative and Unionist candidate. In her parliamentary votes, she was closer to the Labour Party than the Conservative Party. On 6 May 2010, standing as an independent unionist candidate, she was re-elected with a majority of over 14,000 votes ahead of the "Ulster Conservatives and Unionists – New Force" candidate. She was re-elected in May 2015 and June 2017, both times as an independent unionist, and the only independent MP elected in those Parliaments.

Although Hermon had previously been considered to be close to the Labour Party, she has said that she would not support the leader at the time, Jeremy Corbyn, in government. Hermon announced in November 2019 that she would not be standing as a candidate in the 2019 general election on 12 December. Her constituency position went to Stephen Farry of the Alliance Party.

=== Brexit ===
Hermon campaigned for the United Kingdom to remain in the European Union during the 2016 referendum on Brexit. Given that Sinn Féin, who also supported a Remain vote, abstain from taking up their seats in the House of Commons, and the DUP supported a Leave vote, Hermon was the only MP representing Northern Ireland in the 2017 Parliament who supported Remain. Hermon described the potential for a "no-deal" Brexit as a "threat to UK stability" and said that it could lead to a hard border, which could, combined with changing demographics in Northern Ireland, lead to a border poll on a united Ireland, which could lead to Northern Ireland uniting with the Republic of Ireland.

Hermon voted in favour of the Withdrawal Agreement in the meaningful vote on 15 January 2019, which was defeated by 432 votes to 202. She voted against the motion of no confidence in the government of Theresa May called by Jeremy Corbyn the following day. During the phase of indicative votes in Parliament, Hermon voted in favour of a second referendum, as well as the option of revoking Article 50 to avoid a no-deal Brexit.

Parliament of the United Kingdom
Preceded by Robert McCartney	Member of Parliament for North Down; 2001–2019	Succeeded by Stephen Farry
