= The Orange Maid of Sligo =

"The Orange Maid of Sligo" is a traditional Irish song dating from the nineteenth century. It is associated with Irish loyalism, although it is not overtly political in tone.

== Bibliography ==
- Cooper, David. The Musical Traditions of Northern Ireland and Its Diaspora: Community and Conflict. Ashgate Publishing, 2010.
