= Patricia Ford (politician) =

British politician (1921–1995)

The Right Honourable Patricia, Lady Fisher
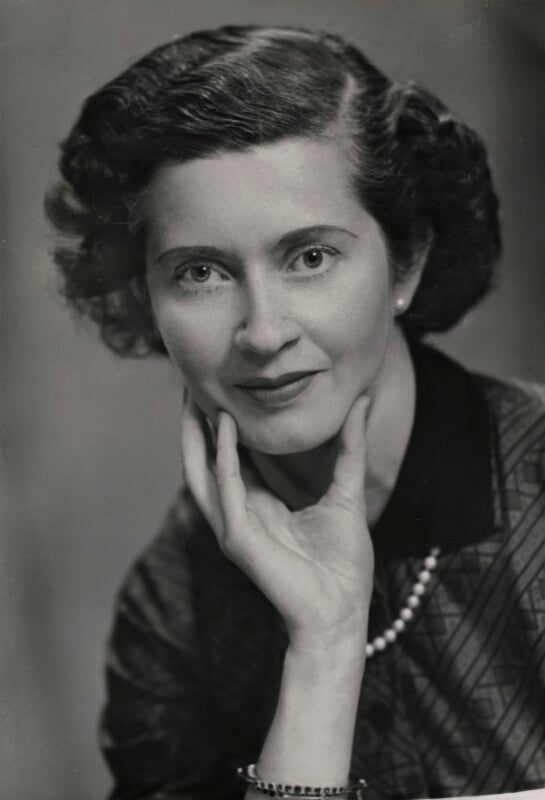
- Fisher in 1953

Member of Parliament for North Down
- In office 15 April 1953 – 6 May 1955
- Prime Minister: Winston Churchill
- Preceded by: Walter Smiles
- Succeeded by: George Currie

Personal details
- Born: Patricia Smiles; 5 April 1921 Donaghadee, County Down, Ulster, Ireland
- Died: 23 May 1995 (aged 74) Chilton, Buckinghamshire, England
- Party: Ulster Unionist Party
- Spouse(s): Neville Ford (m. 1941; div. 1956); 2 daughters Nigel Fisher (m. 1956)
- Children: 2

Patricia Ford, Lady Fisher (née Smiles; 5 April 1921 – 23 May 1995), was briefly an Ulster Unionist Party politician in the House of Commons of the United Kingdom. She was the first woman Member of Parliament from Northern Ireland, and the second woman to be returned to a seat in Westminster from a constituency on the island of Ireland (the first to take her seat).

== Early life ==
She was born at Donaghadee, County Down, and was educated at Bangor Collegiate School; Glendower Preparatory School, London; and abroad. Her father was Sir Walter D. Smiles, an Ulster Unionist MP, and her mother was Margaret Heigway.

== Career ==
Ford returned from living in Cheshire upon her father's death in the MV Princess Victoria disaster in January 1953 and was returned unopposed to Parliament from his North Down constituency. In her maiden speech to the House she was required to apologise for an article she had written in the Sunday Express, in which she mentioned that Bessie Braddock and Edith Summerskill had been snoring whilst asleep in the lady members' room. The matter was referred to the Committee for Privileges.

Ford was an advocate for equal pay and supported the Equal Pay Campaign Committee in their cross-party efforts. On 9 March 1954 she joined the Conservative Party's Irene Ward and the Labour Party's Edith Summerskill and Barbara Castle to submit the 'Equal Pay in the public services' petition, with over 80,000 signatures, to Parliament. The four policiticians arrived together in a horse drawn carriage decorated in suffragette colours.

She retired at the 1955 general election. In 1972, she founded and was co-chairman of the Women Caring Trust (subsequently renamed Hope for Youth Northern Ireland). She was expelled from the Ladies Orange Benevolent Association (L.O.B.A.) for attending a wedding at the Brompton Oratory.

== Personal life ==
In 1941, she married cricketer Neville Montagu Ford, son of the Very Rev. Lionel George Bridges Justice Ford and grandson of the 4th Lord Lyttelton. They had two daughters: Sarah, who married Sir Michael Grylls and whose son is explorer Bear Grylls, and Mary Rose, who is married and has two daughters.

Patricia Ford was divorced from her first husband, and in 1956 married Nigel Fisher MP, thereby becoming stepmother to Mark Fisher, who was later elected a Labour MP. She acquired the title of Lady Fisher when her husband was knighted in 1974.

Parliament of the United Kingdom
Preceded by W. D. Smiles	Member of Parliament for North Down; 1953–1955	Succeeded by George Currie
