= Campaign for Equal Citizenship =

Northern Irish political advocacy group

The Campaign for Equal Citizenship was a political advocacy group that supported the integration of Northern Ireland into the United Kingdom and called for the full participation of mainland political parties in Northern Irish politics.

The group was set up on 14 May 1986, following a meeting in Belfast and was initially chaired by Clifford Smyth and then by Robert McCartney, at the time a member of the Ulster Unionist Party. Many of the CEC's members were also involved in the British and Irish Communist Organisation and its front group, the Ingram Society. It was born from opposition to the Anglo-Irish Agreement with the Campaign fearing that the devolution proposals contained in the AIA would be the first step towards a united Ireland. The group claimed to have cross-community support, although for the most part it was supported by unionists due to its emphasis on links to Britain. However, it did gain some support amongst the 'Catholic Unionist' bloc, Roman Catholic supporters of the Alliance Party of Northern Ireland and a number of people involved with the Campaign for Labour Representation in Northern Ireland.

The group suffered a split in 1988, when its president Robert McCartney resigned over a dispute with its executive.

Ultimately the Labour Party refused their request to organise in Northern Ireland. The same was true of the Conservative Party, although demands by members led to the establishment of a Northern Irish party in 1989. There are loose associations between the Alliance Party and the Liberal Democrats, and the Social Democratic and Labour Party (SDLP) and the UK Labour Party.
