= Dennis Rogan, Baron Rogan =

British politician

The Right Honourable The Lord Rogan
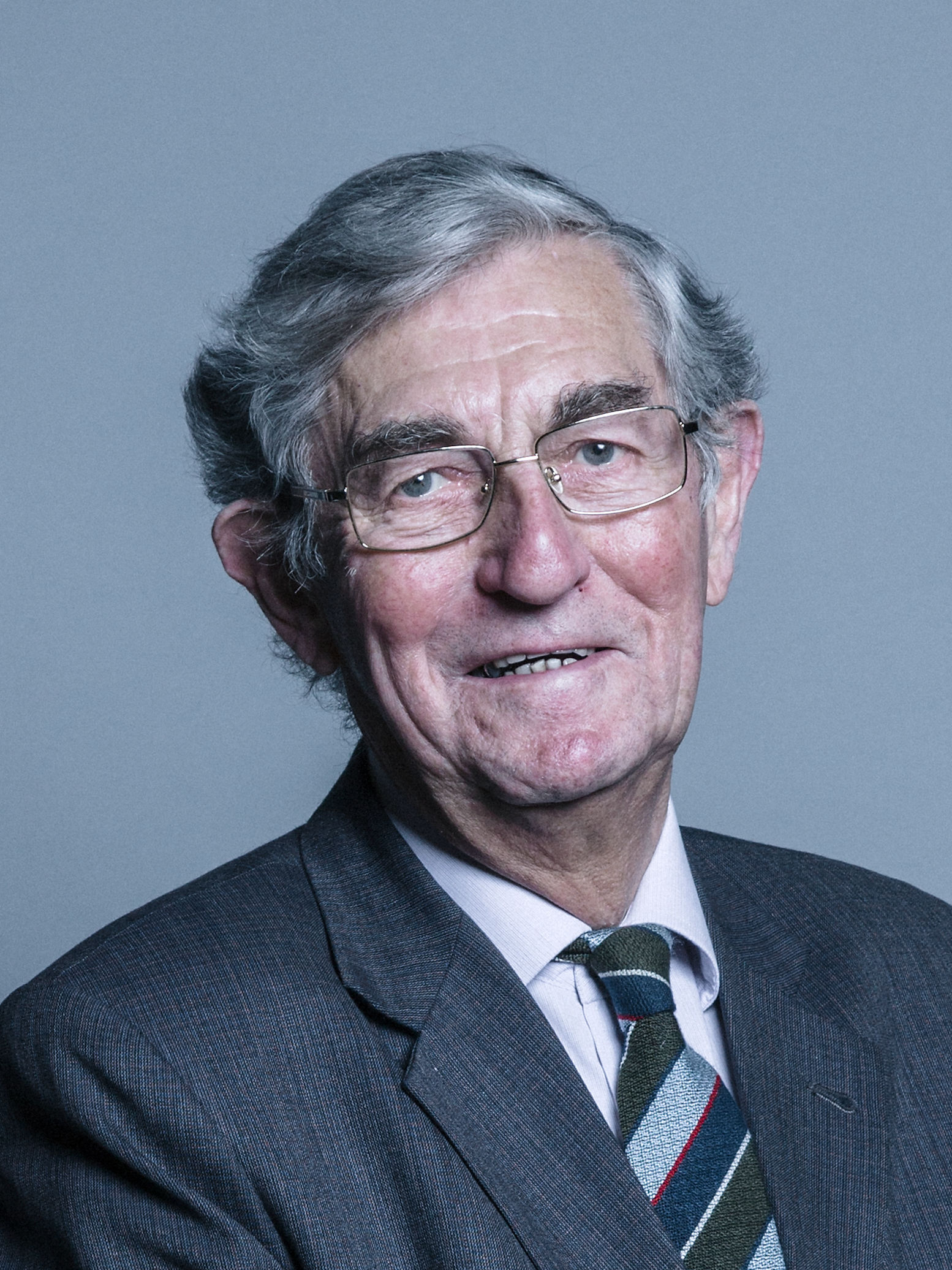

Deputy Speaker of the House of Lords
- Incumbent
- Assumed office 5 March 2018

Leader of the Ulster Unionist Party in the House of Lords
- Incumbent
- Assumed office 2009

President of the Ulster Unionist Party
- In office 2004–2006
- Preceded by: Martin Smyth
- Succeeded by: John White

Member of the House of Lords
- Lord Temporal
- Life peerage 16 July 1999

Personal details
- Born: 30 June 1942 (age 84) Dromore, County Down, Northern Ireland
- Party: Ulster Unionist Party
- Education: Open University; Harvard University

Dennis Robert David Rogan, Baron Rogan (born 30 June 1942), is a Northern Irish unionist politician and businessman, serving as Deputy Speaker of the House of Lords since 2018, and leader of the Ulster Unionist Party (UUP) in the House of Lords since 2009.

He has sat as a life peer in the House of Lords since 1999, and was president of the UUP from 2004 to 2006.

== Background ==
Lord Rogan is the son of Robert and Florence Rogan.

He was created a life peer as Baron Rogan, of Lower Iveagh in the County of Down, on 16 July 1999 and is regarded as leader of the UUP in the Lords.

Lord Rogan is founder and managing director of Dennis Rogan & Associates – Carpet Yarn Brokers, founder and chairman of Associated Processors Ltd – Jute Processors, chairman of Stakeholder Communications Ltd, chairman of Events Management Ltd, and deputy chairman of Independent News & Media (NI) Ltd.

He is a member of the international advisory board of Independent News & Media, patron of The Somme Association and "Friend" of The Salvation Army. Lord Rogan was the honorary colonel of 40 (Ulster) Signals Regiment until its disbandment in 2010.

He has co-chaired the British-Taiwanese all-party parliamentary group.

Lord Rogan supported Britain's exit from the European Union.

He was granted arms on 9 September 2021.

== See also ==
- List of Northern Ireland Members of the House of Lords

Political offices
| Preceded by Martin Smyth | President of the Ulster Unionist Party; 2004–2006 | Succeeded by John White |
Orders of precedence in the United Kingdom
| Preceded by The Lord Faulkner of Worcester | Gentlemen; Baron Rogan | Followed by The Lord Foster of Thames Bank |
