= Lee Clegg =

British Army soldier (born c. 1969)

Sergeant Lee Clegg (born c. 1969) is a British Army soldier who was convicted of murder for his involvement in the shooting dead of one teenage joyrider in West Belfast, Northern Ireland. His conviction was later overturned.

== Shooting ==
The shooting took place in West Belfast on 30 September 1990. Clegg, then a private originally from Bradford, England, and his fellow soldiers manning the checkpoint on the Upper Glen Road, fired nineteen bullets into a stolen Vauxhall Astra that passed through their checkpoint travelling at high speed. Clegg fired four of the bullets, the last of which killed 18-year-old passenger Karen Reilly. The driver, 17-year-old Martin Peake, also died at the scene, while the third passenger, Markiewicz Gorman, escaped with minor injuries.

== Sentencing ==
Clegg was sentenced to life imprisonment for murder in 1993, the court having decided that lethal force had been used without a lawful purpose. The fourth bullet was said to have been fired through the back of the car as it was leaving the checkpoint and was therefore no longer a threat to the soldiers. The murder conviction was condemned by unionists and some newspapers, including the Daily Mail, which began a campaign for Clegg's release on the grounds that he was just doing his job in difficult circumstances.

== Release and aftermath ==
Clegg was released under licence by then Northern Ireland Secretary Patrick Mayhew in 1995, which in turn led to rioting in Irish nationalist areas of Belfast. Sinn Féin repeatedly called the decision a "threat to the peace process". The release followed after a test shooting on another Astra conducted by pathologist Iain West and forensic expert Graham Renshaw on 4 June 1995.

== Appeals ==
A set of appeals to the Court of Appeal and House of Lords led to the quashing of the murder conviction in 1998 and a re-trial in March 1999, on the grounds that new evidence suggested that the fourth bullet entered the side of the car. At the retrial Clegg was cleared of murder, but a conviction for "attempting to wound" the driver of the car, Martin Peake, who also died in the incident, was upheld. The junior lawyer for Clegg was Keir Starmer.

Another appeal, this time at the Northern Ireland Court of Appeal, led to that lesser conviction also being overturned on 31 January 2000 owing to uncertainty over the accuracy of evidence that initially suggested Clegg's final bullet was fired after the vehicle had passed.

Clegg continued to serve as part of 16 Air Assault Brigade. In September 2007 the Daily Mail reported that Clegg would be serving in Afghanistan in 2008 as combat medic with the 2nd Battalion Parachute Regiment.

== Bibliography ==
- BBC News Soldier cleared of murder (1999 report)
- Guardian Unlimited Paratrooper Lee Clegg cleared of last charge over death of teenagers (2000 report)
