= Robert McCartney (Northern Irish politician) =

Northern Irish politician (born 1936)

Bob McCartney KC

Leader of the United Kingdom Unionist Party
- In office 1995–2007
- Deputy: David Vance
- Preceded by: Party created
- Succeeded by: Party dissolved

Member of the Legislative Assembly for North Down
- In office 25 June 1998 – 7 March 2007
- Preceded by: Constituency created
- Succeeded by: Brian Wilson
- In office 20 October 1982 – 1986
- Preceded by: Assembly re-established
- Succeeded by: Assembly abolished

Member of Parliament for North Down
- In office 15 June 1995 – 14 May 2001
- Preceded by: Sir James Kilfedder
- Succeeded by: Sylvia, Lady Hermon

Member of the Northern Ireland Forum for North Down
- In office 30 May 1996 – 25 April 1998
- Preceded by: Forum established
- Succeeded by: Forum dissolved

Personal details
- Born: 24 April 1936 (age 90) Shankill, Belfast, Northern Ireland
- Party: UK Unionist Party (1995 - 2008)
- Other political affiliations: Ulster Unionist Party (Until 1987)
- Education: Queen's University Belfast
- Profession: Barrister; Academic

Robert Law McCartney (born 24 April 1936) is a Northern Irish barrister and Unionist politician who was leader of the UK Unionist Party (UKUP) from 1995 to 2007. He was the Member of Parliament (MP) for North Down from 1995 to 2001 and a Member of the Northern Ireland Assembly (MLA) for North Down from 1998 to 2007.

== Political career ==
McCartney was initially a member of the Ulster Unionist Party (UUP) and first elected to the Northern Ireland Assembly in the 1982 Assembly election for North Down. He was later expelled from the UUP in June 1987, when he refused to withdraw from the general election of that year. He stood against the incumbent Popular Unionist Party MP Sir James Kilfedder in North Down as a "Real Unionist", but failed to win the seat.

In the 1995 by-election in North Down, after the death of Kilfedder, he was elected as a "UK Unionist" defeating the Ulster Unionist Party candidate. He subsequently established the United Kingdom Unionist Party to contest elections to the Northern Ireland Forum and the related talks which started in 1996. The other party representatives to the forum were Conor Cruise O'Brien and Cedric Wilson, a former low-level DUP member in the 1980s. McCartney retained his Westminster seat in the 1997 election.

He opposed the subsequent Good Friday Agreement in the May 1998 referendum and his party won five seats in the Assembly elections later that year (McCartney himself in North Down, Cedric Wilson in Strangford, Patrick Roche in Lagan Valley, Norman Boyd in South Antrim and Roger Hutchinson in East Antrim).

However, Wilson, Roche, Boyd and Hutchinson parted company with McCartney in December 1998 because of their leader's so-called 'exit strategy' from the Northern Ireland Assembly in the event of Sinn Féin being allowed seats in the new Northern Ireland Government. McCartney denounced them, saying all four were "famous in their own living rooms" and that their supporters could "fit into a telephone box". In 2008 both Wilson and Boyd attended meetings of Jim Allister's Traditional Unionist Voice.

In 1999, McCartney ran for the party in elections to the European Parliament, winning 2.9% of the first preference vote. He lost his Westminster seat in the 2001 election to the UUP candidate, Lady Sylvia Hermon.

He was committed to a policy of integration for Northern Ireland, whereby legislative devolution would no longer be Westminster's abiding policy, there would be no Stormont Legislative Assembly and the province would be a fully participating part of the United Kingdom; at the same time, the three main British political parties would fully organise in Northern Ireland. He was the president of the Campaign for Equal Citizenship in 1986, and led it in its four years of prominence after the 1985 Anglo-Irish Agreement. McCartney resigned as head of the Campaign for Equal Citizenship in 1988 over a dispute with its executive.

These integrationist policies, once popular in some sections of Unionism, receded with the introduction of devolution to Scotland and Wales, and the creation of a functioning Northern Ireland Assembly. However it is the case that other parts of the United Kingdom with devolved assemblies are fully covered by the three main British political parties, but not Northern Ireland.

McCartney also strongly opposed the St Andrews Agreement and in 2007 stood on an anti-agreement ticket in six constituencies. He lost his own seat in North Down, polling 1,806 first preference votes (5.9% of the total, and less than half the quota required to be elected). He also obtained 360 votes (1.2%) in Belfast North, 388 votes (0.8%) in Fermanagh and South Tyrone, 853 votes (2.0%) in Lagan Valley, 893 votes (2.3%) in South Antrim and 220 votes (0.5%) in West Tyrone.

== Retirement ==
McCartney claimed to have retired from politics following the loss of his seat in the 2007 Assembly Election to Brian Wilson of the Green Party. However, he still occasionally makes media appearances and writes newspaper articles. In October 2009, McCartney was guest speaker at the Traditional Unionist Voice party conference in Belfast, where he spoke on the situation surrounding the primary school transfer test, brought about by a Sinn Féin Education Minister.

== Notes ==
Northern Ireland Assembly (1982)
New assembly	MPA for North Down; 1982–1986	Assembly abolished
Parliament of the United Kingdom
Preceded by Sir James Kilfedder	Member of Parliament for North Down; 1995–2001	Succeeded by Sylvia, Lady Hermon
Northern Ireland Forum
New forum	Member for North Down; 1996–1998	Forum dissolved
Northern Ireland Assembly
New assembly	MLA for Down North; 1998–2007	Succeeded by Brian Wilson
Party political offices
New political party	Leader of the United Kingdom Unionist Party; 1995–2007	Vacant post not filled until party dissolved
