= Thomas Waring (barrister) =

Irish barrister and Conservative Member of Parliament

Member of Parliament for North Down
- In office 18 December 1885 – 12 August 1898
- Preceded by: Constituency created
- Succeeded by: John Blakiston-Houston

Personal details
- Born: 17 October 1828 Waringstown, Ireland
- Died: 12 August 1898 (aged 69)
- Party: Conservative; Irish Unionist
- Spouse(s): Esther Smyth (d.1873); Fanny Tucker (1874-83, died); Geraldine Stewart
- Profession: Barrister

Col. Thomas Waring JP (17 October 1828 – 12 August 1898) was an Irish barrister and Conservative Member of Parliament in the House of Commons at Westminster.

== Life ==
Born at his family's ancestral home, Waringstown House, Waringstown, County Down, then son of Major Henry Waring JP and Frances Grace Waring (herself the daughter of the Very Rev. Holt Waring, Dean of Dromore). Waring was elected Member of Parliament for North Down in 1885, sitting until his death in 1898. He also served as High Sheriff of Down in 1868. He was an opponent of William Ewart Gladstone's Home Rule policy.

== Family ==
His first wife, Esther Smyth of Ardmore, County Londonderry, died in 1873, aged 36, Waring married, secondly, on 6 August 1874, Fanny Tucker, of Trematon Castle, Cornwall. Fanny Waring died on 13 November 1883. Waring married for a third time, at Rostrevor, to Geraldine Stewart, of Ballyedmond, Rostrevor, County Down.

Parliament of the United Kingdom
New constituency	Member of Parliament for Down, North; 1885–1898	Succeeded by John Blakiston-Houston
