= List of MPs for constituencies in Northern Ireland (1997–2001) =

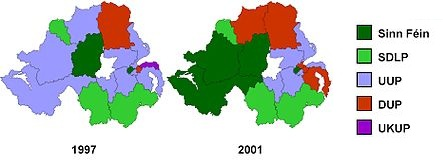
- Colours on map indicate the party allegiance of each constituency's MP.

This is a list of members of Parliament (MPs) elected to the House of Commons of the United Kingdom by Northern Irish constituencies for the 52nd Parliament of the United Kingdom (1997 to 2001). There are 18 such constituencies, thirteen of which were represented by Unionists and five by Nationalists. It includes MPs elected at the 1997 United Kingdom general election, held on 1 May 1997.

The list is sorted by the name of the MP.

Sinn Féin MPs follow an abstentionist policy of not taking their seats in the House of Commons.

== Composition ==
Affiliation	Members
Ulster Unionist	10
SDLP	3
Sinn Féin	2
DUP	2
UK Unionist	1
Total	18

== MPs ==
	Party	MP
East Antrim	Ulster Unionist	Roy Beggs
North Antrim	DUP	Ian Paisley
South Antrim	Ulster Unionist	Clifford Forsythe
Belfast East	DUP	Peter Robinson
Belfast North	Ulster Unionist	Cecil Walker
Belfast South	Ulster Unionist	Martin Smyth
Belfast West	Sinn Féin	Gerry Adams
North Down	UK Unionist	Robert McCartney
South Down	SDLP	Eddie McGrady
Fermanagh and South Tyrone	Ulster Unionist	Ken Maginnis
Foyle	SDLP	John Hume
Lagan Valley	Ulster Unionist	Jeffrey Donaldson
East Londonderry	Ulster Unionist	William Ross
Mid Ulster	Sinn Féin	Martin McGuinness
Newry and Armagh	SDLP	Seamus Mallon
Strangford	Ulster Unionist	John Taylor
West Tyrone	Ulster Unionist	William Thompson
Upper Bann	Ulster Unionist	David Trimble

- William McCrea was elected in the 2000 South Antrim by-election
