= Newtownabbey Area C =

District electoral areas in Newtownabbey, Northern Ireland

Newtownabbey Area C was one of the four district electoral areas in Newtownabbey, Northern Ireland which existed from 1973 to 1985. The district elected five members to Newtownabbey Borough Council, and formed part of the South Antrim constituencies for the Northern Ireland Assembly and UK Parliament.

It was created for the 1973 local elections, and contained the wards of Carnmoney, Cloughfern, Jordanstown, Monkstown and Rostulla. It was abolished for the 1985 local elections and mostly replaced by the Shore Road DEA with Carnmoney moving to the Manse Road DEA.

== Councillors ==
| Election | Councillor (Party) | Councillor (Party) | Councillor (Party) | Councillor (Party) | Councillor (Party) |
|---|---|---|---|---|---|
| 1981 | Samuel Neill (DUP) | Robert Caul (UUP) | Clifford Forsythe (UUP) | Desmond Dowds (Independent Unionist) | Claire Martin (Alliance) |
| 1977 | Samuel Neill (DUP) | Robert Caul (UUP) | Bertram Biggerstaff (UPNI)/ (UUP) | George Jones (Alliance) | Claire Martin (Alliance) |
| 1973 | Samuel Neill (DUP) | Letitia McCartney (UUP) | Bertram Biggerstaff (UPNI)/ (UUP) | Trevor Strain (UUP) | P. H. Johnston (Alliance) |

== 1981 Election ==
1977: 2 x Alliance, 1 x UUP, 1 x DUP, 1 x UPNI

1981: 2 x UUP, 1 x DUP, 1 x Alliance, 1 x Independent Unionist

1977-1981 Change: UUP and Independent Unionist gain from Alliance and UPNI

Newtownabbey Area C - 5 seats
| Party | Candidate | FPv% | Count | | | | | |
| Party | Candidate | FPv% | 1 | 2 | 3 | 4 | 5 | 6 |
|---|---|---|---|---|---|---|---|---|
| DUP | Samuel Neill* | 33.68% | 2,737 | | | | | |
| UUP | Clifford Forsythe | 18.45% | 1,499 | | | | | |
| UUP | Robert Caul* | 15.71% | 1,277 | 2,242.25 | | | | |
| Ind. Unionist | Desmond Dowds | 9.93% | 807 | 1,107.85 | 1,401 | | | |
| Alliance | Claire Martin* | 6.89% | 560 | 608.4 | 665.6 | 744.85 | 786.07 | 1,103.26 |
| Alliance | George Jones* | 6.57% | 534 | 548.3 | 634.1 | 752.8 | 816.34 | 1,044.29 |
| Alliance | Gordon Mawhinney | 5.66% | 460 | 488.05 | 523.8 | 555.65 | 593.99 | |
| Newtownabbey Labour | Brian Caul | 3.10% | 252 | 275.65 | 328.45 | | | |
Electorate: 15,006 Valid: 8,126 (54.15%) Spoilt: 206 Quota: 1,355 Turnout: 8,332 (55.52%)

== 1977 Election ==
1973: 3 x UUP, 1 x Alliance, 1 x DUP

1977: 2 x Alliance, 1 x UUP, 1 x DUP, 1 x UPNI

1973-1977 Change: Alliance and UPNI gain from UUP (two seats)

Newtownabbey Area C - 5 seats
| Party | Candidate | FPv% | Count | | | | | | |
| Party | Candidate | FPv% | 1 | 2 | 3 | 4 | 5 | 6 | 7 |
|---|---|---|---|---|---|---|---|---|---|
| Alliance | Claire Martin | 18.81% | 1,128 | | | | | | |
| UUP | Robert Caul | 17.23% | 1,033 | | | | | | |
| DUP | Samuel Neill* | 17.18% | 1,030 | | | | | | |
| Alliance | George Jones | 14.68% | 880 | 917 | 1,029.31 | | | | |
| Unionist Party NI | Bertram Biggerstaff* | 11.49% | 689 | 703 | 709.16 | 713.39 | 720.38 | 734.78 | 1,110.78 |
| Ind. Unionist | Desmond Dowds | 9.91% | 594 | 606 | 607.43 | 607.79 | 614.06 | 619.4 | 690.4 |
| UUP | Letitia McCartney* | 9.21% | 552 | 565 | 567.64 | 593.32 | 607.57 | 611.92 | |
| Independent | Olive Shannon | 1.50% | 90 | | | | | | |
Electorate: 14,661 Valid: 5,996 (40.90%) Spoilt: 157 Quota: 1,000 Turnout: 6,153 (41.97%)

== 1973 Election ==
1973: 3 x UUP, 1 x Alliance, 1 x DUP

Newtownabbey Area C - 5 seats
| Party | Candidate | FPv% | Count | | | | | | |
| Party | Candidate | FPv% | 1 | 2 | 3 | 4 | 5 | 6 | 7 |
|---|---|---|---|---|---|---|---|---|---|
| UUP | Bertram Biggerstaff | 26.62% | 2,117 | | | | | | |
| DUP | Samuel Neill | 24.96% | 1,985 | | | | | | |
| UUP | Letitia McCartney | 4.69% | 373 | 872.13 | 1,066.27 | 1,066.61 | 1,094.31 | 1,119.57 | 1,386.51 |
| UUP | Trevor Strain | 7.24% | 576 | 657.46 | 897.78 | 898.12 | 912.02 | 926.21 | 1,309.34 |
| Alliance | P. H. Johnston | 11.49% | 914 | 932.13 | 940.97 | 941.97 | 1,116.66 | 1,290.19 | 1,319.49 |
| Alliance | George Jones | 8.10% | 644 | 659.54 | 666 | 666.34 | 734.57 | 1,080.94 | 1,124.49 |
| UUP | James McWatters | 5.29% | 421 | 557.16 | 721.72 | 723.72 | 744.61 | 762.85 | |
| Alliance | Claire Martin | 6.05% | 481 | 498.39 | 505.19 | 507.19 | 594.29 | | |
| NI Labour | J. W. McDowell | 2.26% | 180 | 186.66 | 193.8 | 234.52 | | | |
| NI Labour | D. Doris | 2.53% | 201 | 207.29 | 214.43 | 234.45 | | | |
| NI Labour | Thomas Williamson | 0.78% | 62 | 62 | 66.76 | | | | |
Electorate: 12,142 Valid: 7,954 (65.51%) Spoilt: 78 Quota: 1,326 Turnout: 8,032 (66.15%)
