= Martin Meehan =

Martin Meehan may refer to:

- Marty Meehan (born 1956), former U.S. Representative from Massachusetts and current Chancellor of the University of Massachusetts, Lowell
- Martin Meehan (Irish republican) (1945–2007), Provisional Irish Republican Army member and Sinn Féin politician for South Antrim
