= Newtownabbey Area D =

District electoral areas in Newtownabbey, Northern Ireland

Newtownabbey Area D was one of the four district electoral areas in Newtownabbey, Northern Ireland which existed from 1973 to 1985. The district elected five members to Newtownabbey Borough Council, and formed part of the South Antrim constituencies for the Northern Ireland Assembly and UK Parliament.

It was created for the 1973 local elections, and contained the wards of Ballyhenry, Glengormley, Mossgrove, Mossley and Whitewell. It was abolished for the 1985 local elections and replaced by the Antrim Line DEA and the Manse Road DEA.

== Councillors ==
Election	Councillor (Party)	Councillor (Party)	Councillor (Party)	Councillor (Party)	Councillor (Party)
1981	James Smith (DUP)	Arthur Kell (UUP)	Ivan Hunter (UUP)	James Rooney (Alliance)	George Herron (Independent Unionist)
1977	James Smith (DUP)	Arthur Kell (UUP)	William McKee (UUP)	James Rooney (Alliance)	John Drysdale (Alliance)
1973	James Smith (DUP)	Arthur Kell (UUP)	William McKee (UUP)	M. J. Alexander (UUP)	John Drysdale (Alliance)

== 1981 Election ==
1977: 2 x Alliance, 2 x UUP, 1 x DUP

1981: 2 x UUP, 1 x DUP, 1 x Alliance, 1 x Independent Unionist

1977-1981 Change: Independent Unionist gain from Alliance

Newtownabbey Area D - 5 seats
Party	Candidate	FPv%	Count						
Party	Candidate	FPv%	1	2	3	4	5	6	7
DUP	James Smith*	37.29%	2,926						
Ind. Unionist	George Herron*	12.12%	951	1,557.1					
UUP	Ivan Hunter	12.10%	949	1,282.5	1,406.26				
Alliance	James Rooney*	13.61%	1,068	1,091.2	1,096.14	1,096.62	1,193.2	1,793.2	
UUP	Arthur Kell*	7.14%	560	781.56	833.04	914.4	926.24	993.24	1,169.24
UUP	William McKee*	6.63%	520	889.46	942.5	955.94	962.68	991.52	1,065.52
Independent	John Drysdale*	4.12%	323	330.54	333.66	333.9	396.48		
Alliance	John Smith	3.93%	308	337.58	341.22	341.94	376.68		
Newtownabbey Labour	Thomas Davidson	1.87%	147	159.76	161.84	161.84			
Newtownabbey Labour	Lindsay Prior	1.20%	94	96.5	97.16	97.4			
Electorate: 14,796 Valid: 7,846 (53.03%) Spoilt: 263 Quota: 1,308 Turnout: 8,109 (54.81%)

== 1977 Election ==
1973: 3 x UUP, 1 x Alliance, 1 x DUP

1977: 2 x Alliance, 2 x UUP, 1 x DUP

1977-1981 Change: Alliance gain from UUP

Newtownabbey Area D - 5 seats
Party	Candidate	FPv%	Count			
Party	Candidate	FPv%	1	2	3	4
Alliance	John Drysdale*	27.67%	1,553			
DUP	James Smith*	23.93%	1,343			
UUP	Arthur Kell*	16.96%	952			
Alliance	James Rooney	11.24%	631	1,209.8		
UUP	William McKee*	11.14%	625	650.2	881.9	1,084.14
UUP	James Michael	9.05%	508	517.2	686.25	756.97
Electorate: 13,277 Valid: 5,612 (42.27%) Spoilt: 168 Quota: 916 Turnout: 5,780 (43.53%)

== 1973 Election ==
1973: 3 x UUP, 1 x Alliance, 1 x DUP

Newtownabbey Area D - 5 seats
Party	Candidate	FPv%	Count													
Party	Candidate	FPv%	1	2	3	4	5	6	7	8	9	10	11	12	13	14
UUP	Arthur Kell	16.89%	1,381													
UUP	William McKee	16.19%	1,324	1,326.39	1,327.39	1,327.39	1,328.39	1,333.39	1,349.41	1,353.43	1,430.43					
DUP	James Smith	15.84%	1,295	1,295.29	1,295.29	1,299.29	1,299.29	1,307.29	1,329.29	1,332.3	1,348.43	1,355.79	1,457.79			
UUP	M. J. Alexander	6.30%	515	516.52	516.52	516.52	516.52	520.52	556.53	559.54	750.89	750.89	884.02	922.02	1,364.9	
Alliance	John Drysdale	10.88%	890	890.21	891.21	891.21	893.21	925.21	930.22	1,055.24	1,058.25	1,060.09	1,097.11	1,098.11	1,115.12	1,270.04
Alliance	Daniel Leckey	8.30%	679	679.24	682.24	683.24	685.24	713.24	714.24	830.26	831.28	833.12	860.12	864.12	876.44	1,201.44
SDLP	A. Carlin	6.21%	508	508.01	512.01	523.01	527.01	559.01	559.01	563.01	563.01	563.01	568.01	569.01	570.94	
UUP	George Rae	4.63%	379	382.65	384.65	384.65	385.65	386.65	388.67	388.68	414.19	469.39	523.44	545.44		
Ind. Unionist	George Herron	3.40%	278	278.16	278.16	280.16	281.16	287.16	373.18	379.18	385.23	385.23				
UUP	R. Martin	3.63%	297	302.09	303.09	303.09	307.11	312.11	321.11	325.13						
Alliance	M. Johnston	2.89%	236	236.1	238.1	242.1	245.1	269.1	269.11							
Independent	R. G. Maxwell	2.16%	177	177.09	177.09	177.09	177.09	181.09								
NI Labour	Eleanor McDowell	0.84%	69	69	90	99	163									
NI Labour	David Lowrie	0.78%	64	64.02	69.02	82.02										
Communist	William Somerset	0.55%	45	45	46											
NI Labour	James McFall	0.50%	41	41												
Electorate: 11,933 Valid: 8,178 (68.53%) Spoilt: 63 Quota: 1,364 Turnout: 8,241 (69.06%)
