= Newtownabbey Area B =

District electoral areas in Newtownabbey, Northern Ireland

Newtownabbey Area B was one of the four district electoral areas in Newtownabbey, Northern Ireland which existed from 1973 to 1985. The district elected six members to Newtownabbey Borough Council, and formed part of the South Antrim constituencies for the Northern Ireland Assembly and UK Parliament.

It was created for the 1973 local elections, and contained the wards of Bradan, Coole, Dunanney, Hopefield, Whiteabbey and Whitehouse. It was abolished for the 1985 local elections and replaced by the Doagh Road DEA.

== Councillors ==
Election	Councillor (Party)	Councillor (Party)	Councillor (Party)	Councillor (Party)	Councillor (Party)	Councillor (Party)
1981	David Hanna (DUP)	Cecil Stranger (UUP)/ (Loyalist)	Fraser Agnew (UUP)	Letitia McCartney (UUP)	John Elliott (Alliance)	Robert Kidd (Newtownabbey Labour)/ (NILP)
1977	George Herron (DUP)	Cecil Stranger (UUP)/ (Loyalist)	Ivan Hunter (UUP)	Doris Robb (UUP)	John Elliott (Alliance)	Robert Kidd (Newtownabbey Labour)/ (NILP)
1973	Thomas Gourley (United Loyalist)	Cecil Stranger (UUP)/ (Loyalist)	Alex McGowan (UUP)	Doris Robb (UUP)	John Elliott (Alliance)	Robert Kidd (Newtownabbey Labour)/ (NILP)

== 1981 Election ==
1977: 2 x UUP, 1 x DUP, 1 x Alliance, 1 x Newtownabbey Labour, 1 x Loyalist

1981: 3 x UUP, 1 x DUP, 1 x Alliance, 1 x Newtownabbey Labour

1977-1981 Change: Loyalist joins UUP

Newtownabbey Area B - 6 seats
Party	Candidate	FPv%	Count					
Party	Candidate	FPv%	1	2	3	4	5	6
DUP	David Hanna	34.78%	1,964					
UUP	Fraser Agnew	19.30%	1,090					
UUP	Letitia McCartney	9.69%	547	1,176.37				
UUP	Cecil Stringer*	7.97%	450	809.1				
Newtownabbey Labour	Robert Kidd*	7.67%	433	510.49	590.5	660.04	801.23	983.23
Alliance	John Elliott*	6.42%	363	392.61	453.09	583.62	595.42	653.68
Alliance	Hugh Montgomery	5.15%	291	307.38	351.48	409.62	417.08	445.11
Republican Clubs	Austin Kelly	6.64%	375	378.78	381.93	384.78	396.78	
Newtownabbey Labour	Alistair Keery	1.81%	102	123.42	151.14	169.38		
Communist	William Stewart	0.57%	32	33.89	40.19	41.33		
Electorate: 12,043 Valid: 5,647 (46.89%) Spoilt: 273 Quota: 807 Turnout: 5,920 (49.16%)

== 1977 Election ==
1973: 2 x UUP, 1 x Alliance, 1 x NILP, 1 x Loyalist, 1 x United Loyalist

1977: 2 x UUP, 1 x DUP, 1 x Alliance, 1 x Newtownabbey Labour, 1 x Loyalist

1973-1977 Change: DUP gain from United Loyalist, NILP joins Newtownabbey Labour

Newtownabbey Area B - 6 seats
Party	Candidate	FPv%	Count								
Party	Candidate	FPv%	1	2	3	4	5	6	7	8	9
UUP	Ivan Hunter	17.02%	737								
DUP	George Herron	16.01%	693								
Alliance	John Elliott*	11.92%	516	516.96	517.84	543.84	561.84	600	876.43		
Newtownabbey Labour	Robert Kidd*	8.48%	367	368.6	370.8	450.91	525.91	578.91	606.07	745.07	
UUP	Doris Robb*	12.22%	529	545.64	553.67	554.67	554.67	596.35	661.78	663.78	
Loyalist	Cecil Stringer*	10.56%	457	459.08	492.19	492.19	492.19	530.43	534.59	537.59	544.59
UUP	James McWatters	4.85%	210	302.48	322.39	325.66	325.66	377.06	379.49	403.49	450.49
Alliance	John Mellor	7.02%	304	305.28	305.61	307.61	329.61	342.72			
Ind. Unionist	Thomas Gourley*	5.34%	231	232.6	238.98	240.14	253.25				
Republican Clubs	J. J. Magee	3.88%	168	168	168.11	171.11					
Newtownabbey Labour	Brian Caul	2.70%	117	117.32	117.65						
Electorate: 12,848 Valid: 4,329 (33.69%) Spoilt: 208 Quota: 619 Turnout: 4,537 (35.31%)

== 1973 Election ==
1973: 2 x UUP, 1 x Alliance, 1 x NILP, 1 x Loyalist, 1 x United Loyalist

Newtownabbey Area B - 6 seats
Party	Candidate	FPv%	Count												
Party	Candidate	FPv%	1	2	3	4	5	6	7	8	9	10	11	12	13
UUP	Alex McGowan	20.58%	1,665												
Loyalist	Cecil Stringer	13.67%	1,106	1,121.3	1,122.3	1,122.3	1,124.3	1,124.3	1,142.6	1,142.6	1,463.6				
United Loyalist	Thomas Gourley	9.25%	748	761.8	762.8	762.8	764.4	767.4	777.5	777.5	853.5	1,118.31	1,121.31	1,244.31	
Alliance	John Elliott	9.75%	789	794.1	804.1	807.1	814.1	1,043.4	1,051.1	1,067.1	1,068.1	1,068.1	1,153.1	1,237.1	
UUP	Doris Robb	6.03%	488	744.5	745.5	747.8	747.8	756.1	894.6	895.6	898.8	917.23	918.23	1,100.01	1,158.97
NI Labour	Robert Kidd	5.40%	437	440.3	460.3	485.3	602.2	609.2	612.1	658.1	659.1	664.92	1,034.92	1,124.52	1,128.04
UUP	Agnes Moore	8.76%	709	823.3	823.3	826.3	828.3	834.3	914.8	914.8	916.6	923.39	925.69	995.48	1,021.36
Independent	Edna Stack	5.97%	483	493.8	497.8	505.8	508.4	515.4	534.8	540.8	545.8	557.44	579.44		
NI Labour	William Byrne	2.66%	215	215	230	266	285.3	292.3	293.3	511.3	511.3	511.3			
Loyalist	John Watson	4.92%	398	402.8	403.8	403.8	404.8	405.8	410.3	410.3					
NI Labour	Deirdre Byrne	2.58%	209	209.3	238.3	271.3	282.3	288.3	288.3						
UUP	Joseph Sherrard	2.60%	210	279.6	279.6	280.6	281.6	282.9							
Alliance	Phyllis Fortune	3.26%	264	264.9	268.9	271.9	275.9								
NI Labour	R. Johnston	1.87%	151	153.4	158.4	168.4									
NI Labour	Colm Mullan	1.37%	111	111.3	124.3										
Communist	Joseph Bowers	1.32%	107	107											
Electorate: 13,188 Valid: 8,090 (61.34%) Spoilt: 110 Quota: 1,156 Turnout: 8,200 (62.18%)
