= Duncan Shipley-Dalton =

Northern Irish politician (born 1970)

Duncan Shipley Dalton

Member of the Legislative Assembly for South Antrim
- In office 25 June 1998 – 26 November 2003
- Preceded by: New Creation
- Succeeded by: David Burnside

Personal details
- Born: Isle of Wight, England
- Party: Green Party (since 2023)
- Other political affiliations: Labour Party (2007 - 2022); UUP (1996 - 2007); NI Conservative (pre 1996)
- Education: University of Essex, Queen's University Belfast, Harvard University
- Profession: Barrister

Duncan Shipley Dalton is an English barrister, former Conservative Party activist and former unionist politician in Northern Ireland, who was an Ulster Unionist Party (UUP) Member of the Legislative Assembly (MLA) for South Antrim from 1998 to 2003.

From 1993–1994, he worked for the Royal Ulster Constabulary. Then, from 1994–98, he served in the Royal Irish Regiment.

== Early life and education ==
Shipley Dalton was born and brought up on the Isle of Wight. He studied law at the University of Essex. While serving in the Army he took his Bar examination at Queen's University Belfast and was called to the Bar of Northern Ireland in 1996, specialising in human rights and criminal defence. Later he completed a master's degree in human rights law at Queen's University Belfast. He also completed a further master's degree at Harvard University. In October 2019 he was called to the Bar of England and Wales.

== Political career ==
In May 1996 Shipley Dalton was an unsuccessful candidate for the Conservative Party in the Northern Ireland Forum election in Strangford, gaining 380 votes or 0.9%. He subsequently joined the Ulster Unionist Party (UUP). After the completion of the Stormont talks in 1998 Shipley Dalton was a supporter of the Belfast Agreement. At the 1998 Northern Ireland Assembly election, he was elected in South Antrim. He initially aimed to be selected as candidate for the UUP in the South Antrim by-election in 2000, but later withdrew, claiming that the party leadership preferred David Campbell to be their candidate. He endorsed David Campbell, but announced his retirement from Assembly politics at the forthcoming 2003 election.

After standing down, Shipley Dalton moved to the United States, where he was a supporter of the Democratic Party. In 2007 he returned to Southampton and became a Labour Party member before being expelled.

In 2023, Shipley Dalton joined the Green Party of England and Wales.

Northern Ireland Assembly
New assembly	MLA for Antrim South; 1998–2003	Succeeded by David Burnside
