= 1981 Newtownabbey Borough Council election =

Local government election in Northern Ireland

← 1977	20 May 1981	1985 →

All 21 seats to Newtownabbey Borough Council 11 seats needed for a majority
	First party	Second party	Third party
Party	UUP	DUP	Alliance
Seats won	9	5	3
Seat change	▲1	▲1	▼3
	Fourth party	Fifth party	Sixth party
Party	Ind. Unionist	Newtownabbey Labour	Unionist Party NI
Seats won	3	1	0
Seat change	▲3	0	▼1
	Seventh party
Party	Loyalist
Seats won	0
Seat change	▼1

Elections to Newtownabbey Borough Council were held on 20 May 1981 on the same day as the other Northern Irish local government elections. The election used four district electoral areas to elect a total of 21 councillors.

== Election results ==
Newtownabbey Borough Council Election Result 1981
Party	Seats	Gains	Losses	Net gain/loss	Seats %	Votes %	Votes	+/−
UUP	9	2	1	▲1	42.9	34.5	9,210	▼3.6
DUP	5	1	0	▲1	23.8	34.7	9,275	▲15.8
Alliance	3	0	3	▼3	14.3	15.6	4,174	▼5.3
Ind. Unionist	3	3	0	▲3	9.5	8.8	2,356	▲8.8
Newtownabbey Labour Party	1	0	0	0	4.8	3.8	1,028	▲1.3
Republican Clubs	0	0	0	0	0.0	1.4	375	▲0.5
Independent	0	0	0	0	0.0	1.2	323	▲1.2
Communist	0	0	0	0	0.0	0.1	32	▲0.1

Note: "Votes" are the first preference votes.

== Districts summary ==
Results of the Newtownabbey Borough Council election, 1981 by district
Ward	%	Cllrs	%	Cllrs	%	Cllrs	%	Cllrs	Total Cllrs
Ward	UUP		DUP		Alliance		Others		Total Cllrs
Area A	45.3	2	32.2	2	10.8	0	11.7	1	5
Area B	37.0	2	34.8	1	11.6	1	16.6	1	6
Area C	34.2	2	33.7	1	19.1	1	13.0	0	5
Area D	25.2	2	37.3	1	17.5	1	20.0	1	5
Total	34.5	9	34.7	5	15.6	3	15.2	4	21

== Districts results ==
=== Area A ===
1977: 3 x UUP, 1 x DUP, 1 x Alliance
1981: 2 x UUP, 2 x DUP, 1 x Independent Unionist
1977-1981 Change: DUP and Independent Unionist gain from UUP and Alliance

Newtownabbey Area A - 5 seats
Party	Candidate	FPv%	Count			
Party	Candidate	FPv%	1	2	3	4
UUP	Jim Wilson*	16.62%	850	951		
UUP	Arthur Templeton*	14.82%	758	832	872	
DUP	Trevor Kirkland	16.23%	830	852	853	
DUP	Mary Harkness*	16.00%	818	833	836	836.73
Ind. Unionist	Sidney Cameron*	11.69%	598	760	789	799.22
UUP	John Anderson	13.88%	710	762	786	794.03
Alliance	Pat McCudden*	10.75%	550			
Electorate: 8,958 Valid: 5,114 (57.09%) Spoilt: 129 Quota: 853 Turnout: 5,243 (58.53%)

=== Area B ===
1977: 2 x UUP, 1 x DUP, 1 x Alliance, 1 x Newtownabbey Labour, 1 x Loyalist
1981: 3 x UUP, 1 x DUP, 1 x Alliance, 1 x Newtownabbey Labour
1977-1981 Change: Loyalist joins UUP

Newtownabbey Area B - 6 seats
Party	Candidate	FPv%	Count					
Party	Candidate	FPv%	1	2	3	4	5	6
DUP	David Hanna	34.78%	1,964					
UUP	Fraser Agnew	19.30%	1,090					
UUP	Letitia McCartney	9.69%	547	1,176.37				
UUP	Cecil Stringer*	7.97%	450	809.1				
Newtownabbey Labour	Robert Kidd*	7.67%	433	510.49	590.5	660.04	801.23	983.23
Alliance	John Elliott*	6.42%	363	392.61	453.09	583.62	595.42	653.68
Alliance	Hugh Montgomery	5.15%	291	307.38	351.48	409.62	417.08	445.11
Republican Clubs	Austin Kelly	6.64%	375	378.78	381.93	384.78	396.78	
Newtownabbey Labour	Alistair Keery	1.81%	102	123.42	151.14	169.38		
Communist	William Stewart	0.57%	32	33.89	40.19	41.33		
Electorate: 12,043 Valid: 5,647 (46.89%) Spoilt: 273 Quota: 807 Turnout: 5,920 (49.16%)

=== Area C ===
1977: 2 x Alliance, 1 x UUP, 1 x DUP, 1 x UPNI
1981: 2 x UUP, 1 x DUP, 1 x Alliance, 1 x Independent Unionist
1977-1981 Change: UUP and Independent Unionist gain from Alliance and UPNI

Newtownabbey Area C - 5 seats
Party	Candidate	FPv%	Count					
Party	Candidate	FPv%	1	2	3	4	5	6
DUP	Samuel Neill*	33.68%	2,737					
UUP	Clifford Forsythe	18.45%	1,499					
UUP	Robert Caul*	15.71%	1,277	2,242.25				
Ind. Unionist	Desmond Dowds	9.93%	807	1,107.85	1,401			
Alliance	Claire Martin*	6.89%	560	608.4	665.6	744.85	786.07	1,103.26
Alliance	George Jones*	6.57%	534	548.3	634.1	752.8	816.34	1,044.29
Alliance	Gordon Mawhinney	5.66%	460	488.05	523.8	555.65	593.99	
Newtownabbey Labour	Brian Caul	3.10%	252	275.65	328.45			
Electorate: 15,006 Valid: 8,126 (54.15%) Spoilt: 206 Quota: 1,355 Turnout: 8,332 (55.52%)

=== Area D ===
1977: 2 x Alliance, 2 x UUP, 1 x DUP
1981: 2 x UUP, 1 x DUP, 1 x Alliance, 1 x Independent Unionist
1977-1981 Change: Independent Unionist gain from Alliance

Newtownabbey Area D - 5 seats
Party	Candidate	FPv%	Count						
Party	Candidate	FPv%	1	2	3	4	5	6	7
DUP	James Smith*	37.29%	2,926						
Ind. Unionist	George Herron*	12.12%	951	1,557.1					
UUP	Ivan Hunter	12.10%	949	1,282.5	1,406.26				
Alliance	James Rooney*	13.61%	1,068	1,091.2	1,096.14	1,096.62	1,193.2	1,793.2	
UUP	Arthur Kell*	7.14%	560	781.56	833.04	914.4	926.24	993.24	1,169.24
UUP	William McKee*	6.63%	520	889.46	942.5	955.94	962.68	991.52	1,065.52
Independent	John Drysdale*	4.12%	323	330.54	333.66	333.9	396.48		
Alliance	John Smith	3.93%	308	337.58	341.22	341.94	376.68		
Newtownabbey Labour	Thomas Davidson	1.87%	147	159.76	161.84	161.84			
Newtownabbey Labour	Lindsay Prior	1.20%	94	96.5	97.16	97.4			
Electorate: 14,796 Valid: 7,846 (53.03%) Spoilt: 263 Quota: 1,308 Turnout: 8,109 (54.81%)
