= Newtownabbey Area A =

District electoral areas in Newtownabbey, Northern Ireland

Newtownabbey Area A was one of the four district electoral areas in Newtownabbey, Northern Ireland which existed from 1973 to 1985. The district elected five members to Newtownabbey Borough Council, and formed part of the South Antrim constituencies for the Northern Ireland Assembly and UK Parliament.

It was created for the 1973 local elections, and contained the wards of Ballyclare, Ballyeaston, Ballynure, Doagh and Mallusk. It was abolished for the 1985 local elections and replaced by the Ballyclare DEA.

== Councillors ==
Election	Councillor (Party)	Councillor (Party)	Councillor (Party)	Councillor (Party)	Councillor (Party)
1981	Mary Harkness (DUP)	Trevor Kirkland (DUP)	Jim Wilson (UUP)	Arthur Templeton (UUP)	Sidney Cameron (Independent Unionist)/ (UUP)
1977	Mary Harkness (DUP)	Pat McCudden (Alliance)	Jim Wilson (UUP)	Arthur Templeton (UUP)	Sidney Cameron (Independent Unionist)/ (UUP)
1973	Thomas Bell (DUP)	James Craig (UUP)	Samuel Todd (UUP)	Arthur Templeton (UUP)	Sidney Cameron (Independent Unionist)/ (UUP)

== 1981 Election ==
1977: 3 x UUP, 1 x DUP, 1 x Alliance

1981: 2 x UUP, 2 x DUP, 1 x Independent Unionist

1977-1981 Change: DUP and Independent Unionist gain from UUP and Alliance

Newtownabbey Area A - 5 seats
Party	Candidate	FPv%	Count			
Party	Candidate	FPv%	1	2	3	4
UUP	Jim Wilson*	16.62%	850	951		
UUP	Arthur Templeton*	14.82%	758	832	872	
DUP	Trevor Kirkland	16.23%	830	852	853	
DUP	Mary Harkness*	16.00%	818	833	836	836.73
Ind. Unionist	Sidney Cameron*	11.69%	598	760	789	799.22
UUP	John Anderson	13.88%	710	762	786	794.03
Alliance	Pat McCudden*	10.75%	550			
Electorate: 8,958 Valid: 5,114 (57.09%) Spoilt: 129 Quota: 853 Turnout: 5,243 (58.53%)

== 1977 Election ==
1973: 4 x UUP, 1 x DUP

1977: 3 x UUP, 1 x DUP, 1 x Alliance

1973-1977 Change: Alliance gain from UUP

Newtownabbey Area A - 5 seats
Party	Candidate	FPv%	Count			
Party	Candidate	FPv%	1	2	3	4
UUP	Sidney Cameron*	28.90%	1,053			
DUP	Mary Harkness	17.73%	646			
UUP	Jim Wilson	15.70%	572	685.82		
UUP	Arthur Templeton*	13.23%	482	671.42		
Alliance	Pat McCudden	14.93%	544	572.56	579.46	603.96
UUP	Samuel Todd*	5.46%	199	280.9	346.9	461.18
Dominion Party	Kennedy Lindsay	4.04%	147	168.84	173.64	
Electorate: 8,719 Valid: 3,643 (41.78%) Spoilt: 109 Quota: 608 Turnout: 3,752 (43.03%)

== 1973 Election ==
1973: 4 x UUP, 1 x DUP

Newtownabbey Area A - 5 seats
Party	Candidate	FPv%	Count					
Party	Candidate	FPv%	1	2	3	4	5	6
UUP	Sidney Cameron	26.45%	1,379					
DUP	Thomas Bell	16.84%	878					
UUP	James Craig	15.46%	806	1,085.35				
UUP	Arthur Templeton	11.10%	579	642.64	643.01	674.93	680.78	912.17
UUP	Samuel Todd	11.37%	593	684.39	684.39	737.87	757.28	890.28
Alliance	T. A. Peoples	7.04%	367	382.17	398.17	409.93	699.52	749.92
UUP	Margaret McGregor	4.95%	258	306.84	309.21	409.19	442.93	
Alliance	Elizabeth McDowell	5.77%	301	309.51	343.25	354.45		
NI Labour	Alex Byrne	1.02%	53	54.85				
Electorate: 8,286 Valid: 5,214 (62.93%) Spoilt: 60 Quota: 870 Turnout: 5,274 (63.65%)
