= 1973 Newtownabbey District Council election =

Local government election in Northern Ireland

1973 Newtownabbey Borough Council election
| 30 May 1973 | 1977 → |

All 21 seats to Newtownabbey Borough Council 11 seats needed for a majority
| | First party | Second party | Third party |
|---|---|---|---|
| Party | UUP | Alliance | DUP |
| Seats won | 12 | 3 | 3 |
| | Fourth party | Fifth party | Sixth party |
| Party | NI Labour | Loyalist | United Loyalist |
| Seats won | 1 | 1 | 1 |

Elections to Newtownabbey Borough Council were held on 30 May 1973 on the same day as the other Northern Irish local government elections. The election used four district electoral areas to elect a total of 21 councillors.

== Election results ==
| Party | Seats | ± | First Pref. votes | FPv% | ±% |
|---|---|---|---|---|---|
| UUP | 12 | | 14,070 | 47.8 | |
| Alliance | 3 | | 5,565 | 18.9 | |
| DUP | 3 | | 4,158 | 14.1 | |
| NI Labour | 1 | | 1,793 | 6.1 | |
| Loyalist | 1 | | 1,504 | 5.1 | |
| United Loyalist | 1 | | 748 | 2.5 | |
| Independent | 0 | | 660 | 2.2 | |
| SDLP | 0 | | 508 | 1.7 | |
| Ind. Unionist | 0 | | 278 | 0.9 | |
| Communist | 0 | | 152 | 0.5 | |
| Totals | 21 | | 29,436 | 100.0 | — |

== Districts summary ==
Results of the Newtownabbey Borough Council election, 1973 by district
| Ward | % | Cllrs | % | Cllrs | % | Cllrs | % | Cllrs | % | Cllrs | Total Cllrs |
| Ward | UUP | | Alliance | | DUP | | NILP | | Others | | Total Cllrs |
|---|---|---|---|---|---|---|---|---|---|---|---|
| Area A | 69.3 | 4 | 12.8 | 0 | 16.8 | 1 | 1.0 | 0 | 0.0 | 0 | 5 |
| Area B | 38.0 | 2 | 13.0 | 1 | 0.0 | 0 | 13.9 | 1 | 35.1 | 2 | 6 |
| Area C | 43.8 | 3 | 25.6 | 1 | 25.0 | 1 | 5.6 | 0 | 0.0 | 0 | 5 |
| Area D | 47.6 | 3 | 22.1 | 1 | 15.8 | 1 | 2.1 | 0 | 12.4 | 0 | 5 |
| Total | 47.8 | 12 | 18.9 | 3 | 14.1 | 3 | 6.1 | 1 | 13.1 | 2 | 21 |

== Districts results ==
=== Area A ===
1973: 4 x UUP, 1 x DUP

Newtownabbey Area A - 5 seats
| Party | Candidate | FPv% | Count | | | | | |
| Party | Candidate | FPv% | 1 | 2 | 3 | 4 | 5 | 6 |
|---|---|---|---|---|---|---|---|---|
| UUP | Sidney Cameron | 26.45% | 1,379 | | | | | |
| DUP | Thomas Bell | 16.84% | 878 | | | | | |
| UUP | James Craig | 15.46% | 806 | 1,085.35 | | | | |
| UUP | Arthur Templeton | 11.10% | 579 | 642.64 | 643.01 | 674.93 | 680.78 | 912.17 |
| UUP | Samuel Todd | 11.37% | 593 | 684.39 | 684.39 | 737.87 | 757.28 | 890.28 |
| Alliance | T. A. Peoples | 7.04% | 367 | 382.17 | 398.17 | 409.93 | 699.52 | 749.92 |
| UUP | Margaret McGregor | 4.95% | 258 | 306.84 | 309.21 | 409.19 | 442.93 | |
| Alliance | Elizabeth McDowell | 5.77% | 301 | 309.51 | 343.25 | 354.45 | | |
| NI Labour | Alex Byrne | 1.02% | 53 | 54.85 | | | | |
Electorate: 8,286 Valid: 5,214 (62.93%) Spoilt: 60 Quota: 870 Turnout: 5,274 (63.65%)

=== Area B ===
1973: 2 x UUP, 1 x Alliance, 1 x NILP, 1 x Loyalist, 1 x United Loyalist

Newtownabbey Area B - 6 seats
| Party | Candidate | FPv% | Count | | | | | | | | | | | | |
| Party | Candidate | FPv% | 1 | 2 | 3 | 4 | 5 | 6 | 7 | 8 | 9 | 10 | 11 | 12 | 13 |
|---|---|---|---|---|---|---|---|---|---|---|---|---|---|---|---|
| UUP | Alex McGowan | 20.58% | 1,665 | | | | | | | | | | | | |
| Loyalist | Cecil Stringer | 13.67% | 1,106 | 1,121.3 | 1,122.3 | 1,122.3 | 1,124.3 | 1,124.3 | 1,142.6 | 1,142.6 | 1,463.6 | | | | |
| United Loyalist | Thomas Gourley | 9.25% | 748 | 761.8 | 762.8 | 762.8 | 764.4 | 767.4 | 777.5 | 777.5 | 853.5 | 1,118.31 | 1,121.31 | 1,244.31 | |
| Alliance | John Elliott | 9.75% | 789 | 794.1 | 804.1 | 807.1 | 814.1 | 1,043.4 | 1,051.1 | 1,067.1 | 1,068.1 | 1,068.1 | 1,153.1 | 1,237.1 | |
| UUP | Doris Robb | 6.03% | 488 | 744.5 | 745.5 | 747.8 | 747.8 | 756.1 | 894.6 | 895.6 | 898.8 | 917.23 | 918.23 | 1,100.01 | 1,158.97 |
| NI Labour | Robert Kidd | 5.40% | 437 | 440.3 | 460.3 | 485.3 | 602.2 | 609.2 | 612.1 | 658.1 | 659.1 | 664.92 | 1,034.92 | 1,124.52 | 1,128.04 |
| UUP | Agnes Moore | 8.76% | 709 | 823.3 | 823.3 | 826.3 | 828.3 | 834.3 | 914.8 | 914.8 | 916.6 | 923.39 | 925.69 | 995.48 | 1,021.36 |
| Independent | Edna Stack | 5.97% | 483 | 493.8 | 497.8 | 505.8 | 508.4 | 515.4 | 534.8 | 540.8 | 545.8 | 557.44 | 579.44 | | |
| NI Labour | William Byrne | 2.66% | 215 | 215 | 230 | 266 | 285.3 | 292.3 | 293.3 | 511.3 | 511.3 | 511.3 | | | |
| Loyalist | John Watson | 4.92% | 398 | 402.8 | 403.8 | 403.8 | 404.8 | 405.8 | 410.3 | 410.3 | | | | | |
| NI Labour | Deirdre Byrne | 2.58% | 209 | 209.3 | 238.3 | 271.3 | 282.3 | 288.3 | 288.3 | | | | | | |
| UUP | Joseph Sherrard | 2.60% | 210 | 279.6 | 279.6 | 280.6 | 281.6 | 282.9 | | | | | | | |
| Alliance | Phyllis Fortune | 3.26% | 264 | 264.9 | 268.9 | 271.9 | 275.9 | | | | | | | | |
| NI Labour | R. Johnston | 1.87% | 151 | 153.4 | 158.4 | 168.4 | | | | | | | | | |
| NI Labour | Colm Mullan | 1.37% | 111 | 111.3 | 124.3 | | | | | | | | | | |
| Communist | Joseph Bowers | 1.32% | 107 | 107 | | | | | | | | | | | |
Electorate: 13,188 Valid: 8,090 (61.34%) Spoilt: 110 Quota: 1,156 Turnout: 8,200 (62.18%)

=== Area C ===
1973: 3 x UUP, 1 x Alliance, 1 x DUP

Newtownabbey Area C - 5 seats
| Party | Candidate | FPv% | Count | | | | | | |
| Party | Candidate | FPv% | 1 | 2 | 3 | 4 | 5 | 6 | 7 |
|---|---|---|---|---|---|---|---|---|---|
| UUP | Bertram Biggerstaff | 26.62% | 2,117 | | | | | | |
| DUP | Samuel Neill | 24.96% | 1,985 | | | | | | |
| UUP | Letitia McCartney | 4.69% | 373 | 872.13 | 1,066.27 | 1,066.61 | 1,094.31 | 1,119.57 | 1,386.51 |
| UUP | Trevor Strain | 7.24% | 576 | 657.46 | 897.78 | 898.12 | 912.02 | 926.21 | 1,309.34 |
| Alliance | P. H. Johnston | 11.49% | 914 | 932.13 | 940.97 | 941.97 | 1,116.66 | 1,290.19 | 1,319.49 |
| Alliance | George Jones | 8.10% | 644 | 659.54 | 666 | 666.34 | 734.57 | 1,080.94 | 1,124.49 |
| UUP | James McWatters | 5.29% | 421 | 557.16 | 721.72 | 723.72 | 744.61 | 762.85 | |
| Alliance | Claire Martin | 6.05% | 481 | 498.39 | 505.19 | 507.19 | 594.29 | | |
| NI Labour | J. W. McDowell | 2.26% | 180 | 186.66 | 193.8 | 234.52 | | | |
| NI Labour | D. Doris | 2.53% | 201 | 207.29 | 214.43 | 234.45 | | | |
| NI Labour | Thomas Williamson | 0.78% | 62 | 62 | 66.76 | | | | |
Electorate: 12,142 Valid: 7,954 (65.51%) Spoilt: 78 Quota: 1,326 Turnout: 8,032 (66.15%)

=== Area D ===
1973: 3 x UUP, 1 x Alliance, 1 x DUP

Newtownabbey Area D - 5 seats
| Party | Candidate | FPv% | Count | | | | | | | | | | | | | |
| Party | Candidate | FPv% | 1 | 2 | 3 | 4 | 5 | 6 | 7 | 8 | 9 | 10 | 11 | 12 | 13 | 14 |
|---|---|---|---|---|---|---|---|---|---|---|---|---|---|---|---|---|
| UUP | Arthur Kell | 16.89% | 1,381 | | | | | | | | | | | | | |
| UUP | William McKee | 16.19% | 1,324 | 1,326.39 | 1,327.39 | 1,327.39 | 1,328.39 | 1,333.39 | 1,349.41 | 1,353.43 | 1,430.43 | | | | | |
| DUP | James Smith | 15.84% | 1,295 | 1,295.29 | 1,295.29 | 1,299.29 | 1,299.29 | 1,307.29 | 1,329.29 | 1,332.3 | 1,348.43 | 1,355.79 | 1,457.79 | | | |
| UUP | M. J. Alexander | 6.30% | 515 | 516.52 | 516.52 | 516.52 | 516.52 | 520.52 | 556.53 | 559.54 | 750.89 | 750.89 | 884.02 | 922.02 | 1,364.9 | |
| Alliance | John Drysdale | 10.88% | 890 | 890.21 | 891.21 | 891.21 | 893.21 | 925.21 | 930.22 | 1,055.24 | 1,058.25 | 1,060.09 | 1,097.11 | 1,098.11 | 1,115.12 | 1,270.04 |
| Alliance | Daniel Leckey | 8.30% | 679 | 679.24 | 682.24 | 683.24 | 685.24 | 713.24 | 714.24 | 830.26 | 831.28 | 833.12 | 860.12 | 864.12 | 876.44 | 1,201.44 |
| SDLP | A. Carlin | 6.21% | 508 | 508.01 | 512.01 | 523.01 | 527.01 | 559.01 | 559.01 | 563.01 | 563.01 | 563.01 | 568.01 | 569.01 | 570.94 | |
| UUP | George Rae | 4.63% | 379 | 382.65 | 384.65 | 384.65 | 385.65 | 386.65 | 388.67 | 388.68 | 414.19 | 469.39 | 523.44 | 545.44 | | |
| Ind. Unionist | George Herron | 3.40% | 278 | 278.16 | 278.16 | 280.16 | 281.16 | 287.16 | 373.18 | 379.18 | 385.23 | 385.23 | | | | |
| UUP | R. Martin | 3.63% | 297 | 302.09 | 303.09 | 303.09 | 307.11 | 312.11 | 321.11 | 325.13 | | | | | | |
| Alliance | M. Johnston | 2.89% | 236 | 236.1 | 238.1 | 242.1 | 245.1 | 269.1 | 269.11 | | | | | | | |
| Independent | R. G. Maxwell | 2.16% | 177 | 177.09 | 177.09 | 177.09 | 177.09 | 181.09 | | | | | | | | |
| NI Labour | Eleanor McDowell | 0.84% | 69 | 69 | 90 | 99 | 163 | | | | | | | | | |
| NI Labour | David Lowrie | 0.78% | 64 | 64.02 | 69.02 | 82.02 | | | | | | | | | | |
| Communist | William Somerset | 0.55% | 45 | 45 | 46 | | | | | | | | | | | |
| NI Labour | James McFall | 0.50% | 41 | 41 | | | | | | | | | | | | |
Electorate: 11,933 Valid: 8,178 (68.53%) Spoilt: 63 Quota: 1,364 Turnout: 8,241 (69.06%)
