= Loyalist Communities Council =

Loyalist organisation in Northern Ireland

- Formation: 9 October 2015; 11 years ago
- Founder: Jonathan Powell; David Campbell; David McNarry; Billy Hutchinson
- Purpose: British unionism; Ulster loyalism
- Chair: David Campbell

The Loyalist Communities Council (LCC) is a British Unionist and Loyalist organisation in Northern Ireland.

The organisation was founded in 2015 by English diplomat Jonathan Powell, and former Ulster Unionist Party chairman David Campbell, along with David McNarry and Billy Hutchinson.

Among representatives within the council are those representing paramilitary organisations such as the Ulster Volunteer Force (UVF), Ulster Defence Association (UDA) and Red Hand Commando (RHC).

In 2024, BBC News described the organisation as a legal entity that represents illegal organisations.

== History ==
=== Establishment ===
The organisation was launched in 2015 by former Downing Street Chief of Staff, Jonathan Powell. who had played a role within the political and social peace talks in Northern Ireland, along with UKIP Member of the Legislative Assembly (MLA) David McNarry, and Progressive Unionist Party leader Billy Hutchinson.

The organisation was launched on 13 October 2015 at a press conference fronted by Powell, McNarry and Hutchinson in response to the perceived neglect and social and political disenfranchisement of working class loyalists. As well as political issues, conceived social focuses of the council are upon looking at and improving areas of disadvantage including education.

The chairman of the council since its founding is David Campbell. Campbell is a former UUP politician and chairman, a former Senior Policy Advisor and Chief of Staff to Northern Ireland First Minister David Trimble and an Honorary Consul for Turkey in Northern Ireland as appointed by the Turkish President.

On the council's launch Dr Ian McNie, then moderator of the Presbyterian Church in Ireland said

We acknowledge the efforts made to encourage loyalist paramilitaries to participate constructively in an ongoing process towards a better society. This has to be a society in which more people feel included and engaged and where educational under-achievement and other disadvantages are tackled.

At the time of the council's launch, DUP MP Jeffrey Donaldson who would later become party leader said the organisation

could be a positive step towards a more normal society. The fact that three paramilitary groups have given their backing to this initiative is a positive statement of intent that they are prepared to look at how we can move forward in Northern Ireland.

=== Post-foundation ===
In the 2017 UK general election the LCC issued a statement supporting the DUP and the UUP. However, this support was rejected by both parties.

During the Brexit negotiations the council said that it was "strongly opposed" to the proposed Withdrawal Agreement due to the treatment of the Irish border question. In late February 2021 the DUP met with the LCC to discuss the Northern Ireland Protocol. In early March 2021 the LCC declared that, as a result of its opposition to the protocol, it would no longer support the Good Friday Agreement.

In 2024, BBC News described the organisation as paradoxical as a legal entity that represents illegal organisations, as well as being opaque in its structure and activities.
