= 1977 Newtownabbey Borough Council election =

Local government election in Northern Ireland

← 1973	18 May 1977	1981 →

All 21 seats to Newtownabbey Borough Council 11 seats needed for a majority
	First party	Second party	Third party
Party	UUP	Alliance	DUP
Seats won	8	6	4
Seat change	▼4	▲3	▲1
	Fourth party	Fifth party	Sixth party
Party	Unionist Party NI	Newtownabbey Labour	Loyalist
Seats won	1	1	1
Seat change	▲1	▲1	0
	Seventh party	Eighth party
Party	NI Labour	United Loyalist
Seats won	0	0
Seat change	▼1	▼1

Elections to Newtownabbey Borough Council were held on 18 May 1977 on the same day as the other Northern Irish local government elections. The election used four district electoral areas to elect a total of 21 councillors.

== Election results ==
Newtownabbey Borough Council Election Result 1977
Party	Seats	Gains	Losses	Net gain/loss	Seats %	Votes %	Votes	+/−
UUP	8	0	4	▼4	38.1	38.1	7,452	▼9.7
Alliance	6	3	0	▲3	28.6	28.4	5,556	▲9.5
DUP	4	1	0	▲1	19.0	19.0	3,712	▲4.9
Unionist Party NI	1	1	0	▲1	4.8	3.5	689	New
Loyalist	1	0	0	0	0.0	2.3	457	▲2.8
Ind. Unionist	0	0	0	0	4.2	2.5	825	▲4.2
Republican Clubs	0	0	0	0	0.0	0.9	168	New
British Ulster Dominion Party	0	0	0	0	0.0	0.8	147	New
Independent	0	0	0	0	0.0	0.5	90	▼1.7
Communist	0	0	0	0	0.0	0.1	32	▲0.1

Note: "Votes" are the first preference votes.

== Districts summary ==
Results of the Newtownabbey Borough Council election, 1977 by district
Ward	%	Cllrs	%	Cllrs	%	Cllrs	%	Cllrs	%	Cllrs	Total Cllrs
Ward	UUP		Alliance		DUP		UPNI		Others		Total Cllrs
Area A	63.3	3	14.9	1	17.7	1	0.0	0	4.1	0	5
Area B	34.1	2	18.9	1	16.0	1	0.0	0	31.0	2	6
Area C	26.4	1	33.5	2	17.2	1	11.5	1	11.4	0	5
Area D	37.2	2	38.9	2	23.9	1	0.0	0	0.0	0	5
Total	38.1	8	28.4	6	19.0	4	3.5	1	11.0	2	21

== Districts results ==
=== Area A ===
1973: 4 x UUP, 1 x DUP
1977: 3 x UUP, 1 x DUP, 1 x Alliance
1973-1977 Change: Alliance gain from UUP

Newtownabbey Area A - 5 seats
Party	Candidate	FPv%	Count			
Party	Candidate	FPv%	1	2	3	4
UUP	Sidney Cameron*	28.90%	1,053			
DUP	Mary Harkness	17.73%	646			
UUP	Jim Wilson	15.70%	572	685.82		
UUP	Arthur Templeton*	13.23%	482	671.42		
Alliance	Pat McCudden	14.93%	544	572.56	579.46	603.96
UUP	Samuel Todd*	5.46%	199	280.9	346.9	461.18
Dominion Party	Kennedy Lindsay	4.04%	147	168.84	173.64	
Electorate: 8,719 Valid: 3,643 (41.78%) Spoilt: 109 Quota: 608 Turnout: 3,752 (43.03%)

=== Area B ===
1973: 2 x UUP, 1 x Alliance, 1 x NILP, 1 x Loyalist, 1 x United Loyalist
1977: 2 x UUP, 1 x DUP, 1 x Alliance, 1 x Newtownabbey Labour, 1 x Loyalist
1973-1977 Change: DUP gain from United Loyalist, NILP joins Newtownabbey Labour

Newtownabbey Area B - 6 seats
Party	Candidate	FPv%	Count								
Party	Candidate	FPv%	1	2	3	4	5	6	7	8	9
UUP	Ivan Hunter	17.02%	737								
DUP	George Herron	16.01%	693								
Alliance	John Elliott*	11.92%	516	516.96	517.84	543.84	561.84	600	876.43		
Newtownabbey Labour	Robert Kidd*	8.48%	367	368.6	370.8	450.91	525.91	578.91	606.07	745.07	
UUP	Doris Robb*	12.22%	529	545.64	553.67	554.67	554.67	596.35	661.78	663.78	
Loyalist	Cecil Stringer*	10.56%	457	459.08	492.19	492.19	492.19	530.43	534.59	537.59	544.59
UUP	James McWatters	4.85%	210	302.48	322.39	325.66	325.66	377.06	379.49	403.49	450.49
Alliance	John Mellor	7.02%	304	305.28	305.61	307.61	329.61	342.72			
Ind. Unionist	Thomas Gourley*	5.34%	231	232.6	238.98	240.14	253.25				
Republican Clubs	J. J. Magee	3.88%	168	168	168.11	171.11					
Newtownabbey Labour	Brian Caul	2.70%	117	117.32	117.65						
Electorate: 12,848 Valid: 4,329 (33.69%) Spoilt: 208 Quota: 619 Turnout: 4,537 (35.31%)

=== Area C ===
1973: 3 x UUP, 1 x Alliance, 1 x DUP
1977: 2 x Alliance, 1 x UUP, 1 x DUP, 1 x UPNI
1973-1977 Change: Alliance and UPNI gain from UUP (two seats)

Newtownabbey Area C - 5 seats
Party	Candidate	FPv%	Count						
Party	Candidate	FPv%	1	2	3	4	5	6	7
Alliance	Claire Martin	18.81%	1,128						
UUP	Robert Caul	17.23%	1,033						
DUP	Samuel Neill*	17.18%	1,030						
Alliance	George Jones	14.68%	880	917	1,029.31				
Unionist Party NI	Bertram Biggerstaff*	11.49%	689	703	709.16	713.39	720.38	734.78	1,110.78
Ind. Unionist	Desmond Dowds	9.91%	594	606	607.43	607.79	614.06	619.4	690.4
UUP	Letitia McCartney*	9.21%	552	565	567.64	593.32	607.57	611.92	
Independent	Olive Shannon	1.50%	90						
Electorate: 14,661 Valid: 5,996 (40.90%) Spoilt: 157 Quota: 1,000 Turnout: 6,153 (41.97%)

=== Area D ===
1973: 3 x UUP, 1 x Alliance, 1 x DUP
1977: 2 x Alliance, 2 x UUP, 1 x DUP
1977-1981 Change: Alliance gain from UUP

Newtownabbey Area D - 5 seats
Party	Candidate	FPv%	Count			
Party	Candidate	FPv%	1	2	3	4
Alliance	John Drysdale*	27.67%	1,553			
DUP	James Smith*	23.93%	1,343			
UUP	Arthur Kell*	16.96%	952			
Alliance	James Rooney	11.24%	631	1,209.8		
UUP	William McKee*	11.14%	625	650.2	881.9	1,084.14
UUP	James Michael	9.05%	508	517.2	686.25	756.97
Electorate: 13,277 Valid: 5,612 (42.27%) Spoilt: 168 Quota: 916 Turnout: 5,780 (43.53%)
