= 2000 South Antrim by-election =

UK parliamentary by-election

- 21 September 2000
- Turnout: 43%
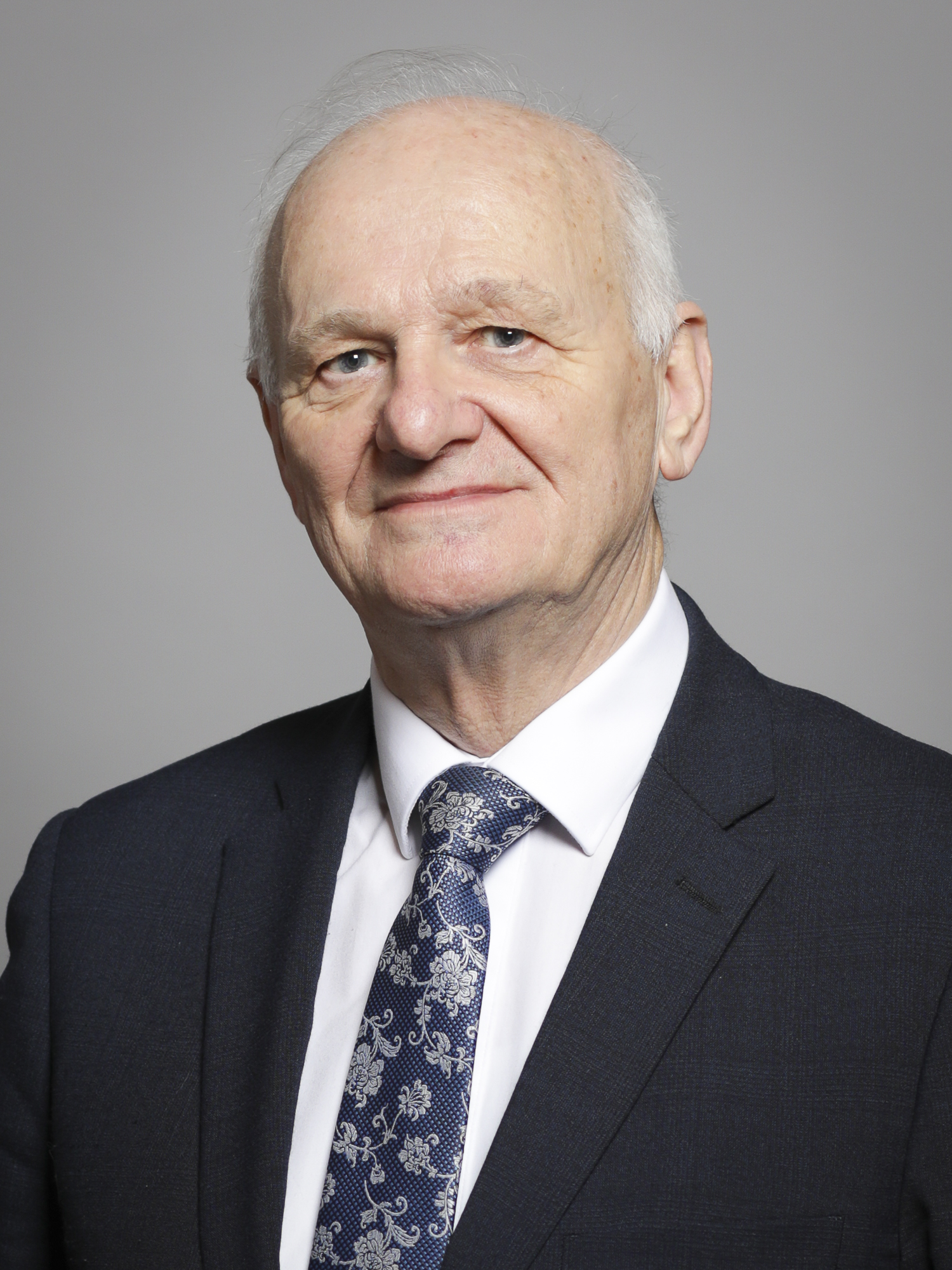

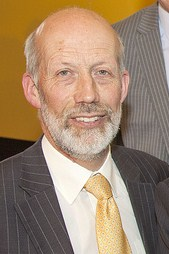
	First party	Second party	Third party
Candidate	William McCrea	David Burnside	Donovan McClelland
Party	DUP	UUP	SDLP
Popular vote	11,601	10,779	3,496
Percentage	38.0%	35.3%	11.4%
Swing	New	▼22.2pp	▼4.7pp
	Fourth party	Fifth party
Candidate	Martin Meehan	David Ford
Party	Sinn Féin	Alliance
Popular vote	2,611	2,031
Percentage	8.5%	6.6%
Swing	▲3.0pp	▼5.0pp
MP before election
Clifford Forsythe
UUP
Elected MP
William McCrea
DUP

A by-election for the United Kingdom parliamentary constituency of South Antrim was held on 21 September 2000 following the death of incumbent Ulster Unionist Party (UUP) Member of Parliament (MP) Clifford Forsythe. It was won by William McCrea of the Democratic Unionist Party (DUP), who gained the seat from the UUP.

== Candidates ==
The election arose after the Good Friday Agreement, with prisoner releases having started, but before the pro-agreement parties had reached an agreement on the shape of a devolved government. After a disputatious selection contest, the London-based public relations executive David Burnside was selected as the new Ulster Unionist Party candidate. Burnside claimed to have supported the Agreement at the time of its negotiation but to have since turned against the way in which it was being implemented. However this was at odds with his party's policy. This was seized upon by the Democratic Unionist Party candidate, former Mid-Ulster MP Rev. William McCrea in campaigning. McCrea campaigned on a policy of refusal to co-operate with Sinn Féin in the absence of progress on arms decommissioning.

The Northern Ireland Unionist Party initially selected Norman Boyd, who was a local member of the Northern Ireland Assembly (elected as a member of the United Kingdom Unionist Party). However, during the campaign Boyd withdrew, urging voters not to divide the anti-agreement vote, and supported McCrea. Although the Progressive Unionist Party had secured 8.7% of the vote at the previous general election, they did not stand on this occasion.

The Alliance Party of Northern Ireland selected David Ford, who was a member of the Northern Ireland Assembly for the area and who had previously fought the seat in the 1997 general election. With all the Unionist candidates opposed to the Good Friday Agreement to some degree, Ford hoped to gain the support of pro Agreement unionist voters. However, with the Unionist parties fighting fiercely, Ford faced the difficult task of convincing voters that a vote for the Alliance was not wasted, especially when many who supported the Agreement argued that the best realistic result for maintaining it would be for Burnside to win the seat.

The nationalist SDLP also ran their local assembly member, in this case Donovan McClelland. With the constituency overwhelmingly Protestant the SDLP had no chance of winning and much of the spotlight on them concerned their electoral battle with Sinn Féin as a prelude to forthcoming Assembly elections. Sinn Féin had no Assembly members but ran Martin Meehan, who had been their sole Assembly candidate the last time, in the hope of increasing his profile and building up their local organisation in preparation for a shot at the next election. The battle between McClelland and Meehan attracted much attention as it would indicate the movement of votes within the nationalist community between the two parties, though most agreed that it was always likely for the SDLP to come out on top in the highly middle-class constituency.

In addition the Natural Law Party selected David Collins. This was to be one of the last occasions that the party would fight an election in Northern Ireland.

== Campaign ==
With delays over the selection and the summer holiday intervening, polling day in the by-election was held off until 21 September, allowing extensive campaigning. The constituency is strongly Protestant and it was always clear that the real contest was between the two Unionist parties. Away from these two, interest was piqued by the advance of Sinn Féin, overtaking the Alliance in the number of votes won. Many believed that this heralded the former party subsequently taking the latter's Assembly seat in the next assembly election, but in the event Ford narrowly held on.

== Result ==
2000 South Antrim by-election
Party	Candidate	Votes	%	±%
DUP	William McCrea	11,601	38.0	New
UUP	David Burnside	10,779	35.3	−22.2
SDLP	Donovan McClelland	3,496	11.4	−4.7
Sinn Féin	Martin Meehan	2,611	8.5	+3.0
Alliance	David Ford	2,031	6.6	−5.0
Natural Law	David H. Collins	49	0.2	−0.3
Majority		822	2.7	N/A
Turnout		30,567	43.0	−14.8
Registered electors		71,047		
DUP gain from UUP		Swing	-5.7	

== General election result, 1997 ==
General election 1997: South Antrim
Party	Candidate	Votes	%	±%
UUP	Clifford Forsythe	23,108	57.5	−13.9
SDLP	Donovan McClelland	6,497	16.2	+3.4
Alliance	David Ford	4,668	11.6	+0.7
PUP	Hugh Smyth	3,490	9.0	New
Sinn Féin	Henry Cushinan	2,229	5.5	+2.5
Natural Law	Barbara A. Briggs	203	0.5	New
Majority		16,611	41.3	−16.8
Turnout		40,195	57.8	−5.1
Registered electors		69,512		
UUP hold		Swing	-8.2	

== See also ==
- List of United Kingdom by-elections
