= William McCrea, Baron McCrea of Magherafelt and Cookstown =

Northern Irish politician (born 1948)

The Reverend and Right Honourable The Lord McCrea of Magherafelt and Cookstown
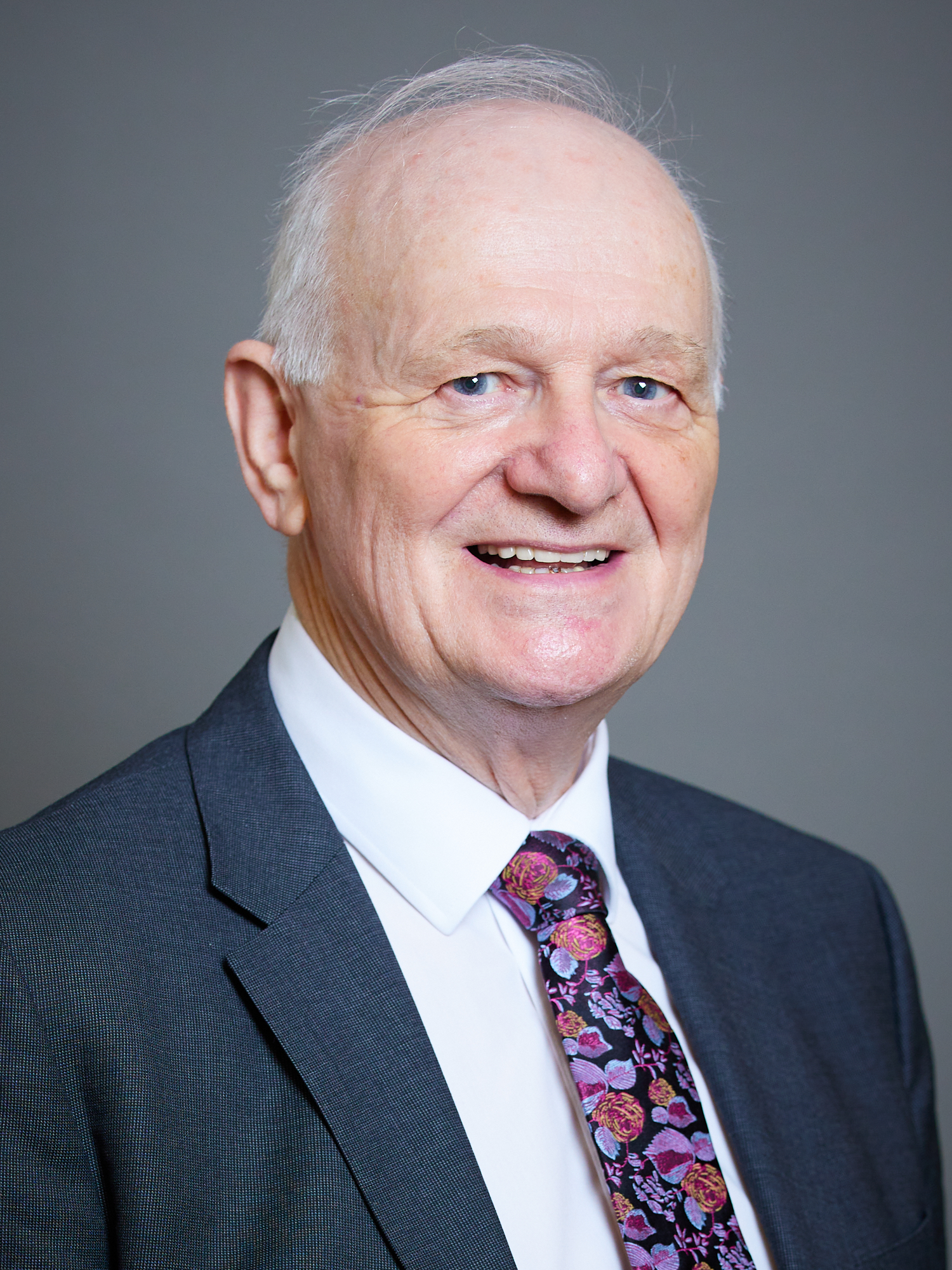
- Official portrait, 2022

Member of the House of Lords
- Lord Temporal
- Life peerage 19 June 2018

Member of Parliament for South Antrim
- In office 5 May 2005 – 30 March 2015
- Preceded by: David Burnside
- Succeeded by: Danny Kinahan
- In office 21 September 2000 – 14 May 2001
- Preceded by: Clifford Forsythe
- Succeeded by: David Burnside

Member of Parliament for Mid Ulster
- In office 9 June 1983 – 8 April 1997
- Preceded by: John Dunlop
- Succeeded by: Martin McGuinness

Member of the Legislative Assembly for South Antrim
- In office 7 March 2007 – 1 July 2010
- Preceded by: Paul Girvan
- Succeeded by: Paul Girvan

Member of the Legislative Assembly for Mid-Ulster
- In office 25 June 1998 – 30 January 2007
- Preceded by: Office created
- Succeeded by: Ian McCrea

Personal details
- Born: 6 August 1948 (age 78) Stewartstown, County Tyrone, Northern Ireland
- Party: Democratic Unionist Party
- Children: 5 (including Ian McCrea)
- Education: Ravenhill Theological Hall
- Occupation: Politician
- Profession: Minister
- Website: William McCrea website

Robert Thomas William McCrea, Baron McCrea of Magherafelt and Cookstown (born 6 August 1948) is a Democratic Unionist Party (DUP) politician, Christian singer and retired Free Presbyterian minister from Northern Ireland. As a politician, he represented South Antrim and Mid Ulster as their Member of Parliament (MP), representing Mid Ulster from 1983 to 1997; then South Antrim between 2000 and 2001, and then again from 2005 to 2015.

McCrea was also a Member of the Northern Ireland Assembly (MLA) for Mid Ulster from 1998 to 2007, before moving to represent South Antrim in the Assembly from 2007 to 2010.

== Early life and education ==
Robert Thomas William McCrea was born on 6 August 1948 in Stewartstown, Northern Ireland, the youngest of five children of Robert McCrea, a farmer, and Sarah Jayne. He was educated at Cookstown High School and spent a short time working in Social Security in the Civil Service of Northern Ireland before beginning training as a Free Presbyterian Church of Ulster minister. He undertook this training at Ravenhill Theological Hall in Belfast.

== Career ==
McCrea was a Democratic Unionist Party (DUP) member of Magherafelt District Council from its creation in 1973 until he stood down to concentrate on Westminster duties in 2010, and topped the poll in every local government election he contested from 1973–2005.

He ran unsuccessfully for the House of Commons at the 1982 Belfast South by-election. He was Member of Parliament for Mid Ulster from 1983 but lost this seat to Sinn Féin chief negotiator and deputy First Minister Martin McGuinness at the 1997 election. He took South Antrim at a by-election in 2000 caused by the death of Ulster Unionist Party MP Clifford Forsythe, but failed to retain this seat at the 2001 election. In the 2005 election he regained the seat anD held it at the 2010 election. The seat was regained by the UUP in 2015.

In 1996, he was elected to the Northern Ireland Forum for Mid-Ulster. From 1998 to 2007 he was a member of the Northern Ireland Assembly for Mid Ulster. He was therefore a political representative for two separate constituencies (Mid Ulster and South Antrim) from 2000 to 2001 and from 2005 to 2007.

At the 2007 election, he was elected as an Assembly Member for South Antrim. He resigned from the Assembly in 2010, following his return to Westminster at the general election of that year.

McCrea retired from ministry in 2018. He has made numerous gospel albums.

McCrea was created a life peer on 19 June 2018, taking the title Baron McCrea of Magherafelt and Cookstown, of Magherafelt in the County of Londonderry and Cookstown in the County of Tyrone.

== Controversy and paramilitary associations ==
McCrea was convicted in 1971 of riotous behaviour in Dungiven and sentenced to six months imprisonment. In 1972, McCrea issued a press release, saying, "We call on all Loyalists to give their continued support to the Ulster Defence Association as it seeks to ensure the safety of all law-abiding citizens against the bombs and bullets of the IRA. As the Catholic population have given their support to the IRA throughout this campaign of terror so must Loyalists grant unswerving support to those engaged in the cause of truth."

In September 1972, McCrea spoke at a rally in the Shankill Road area of Belfast protesting the conduct of the British Army's Parachute Regiment stationed locally, telling the crowd: "We never asked for the Army to come in. The loyalist people of Northern Ireland could have finished it themselves with the forces in this community." Uniformed UDA members checked cars entering the Glencairn estate before the protest and a UDA Land Rover patrolled in the vicinity. In 1975 he led a prayer service at the funerals of paramilitary members Wesley Somerville and Harris Boyle. The two terrorists were part of the Glenanne gang which carried out the Miami Showband killings and were accidentally blown up when the bomb they were planting in the band's minibus went off prematurely, killing them instantly. McCrea also conducted the funeral service for Benjamin Redfern, a UDA member who died while trying to escape the Maze Prison in a bin lorry in August 1984. Redfern was serving a life sentence for the murder of two Catholics.

At the DUP annual conference of April 1986, McCrea interrupted councillor Ethel Smyth when she said she regretted the death of Sean Downes, a 24-year-old Catholic civilian who had been killed by a plastic bullet fired by the Royal Ulster Constabulary (RUC) during an anti-internment march in Andersonstown in August 1984. McCrea shouted, "No. No. I’ll not condemn the death of John Downes [sic]. No Fenian. Never. No". In Northern Ireland and Scotland, the word Fenian is used as a slur for Roman Catholics.

Speaking in the Northern Ireland Assembly in March 1984 following an attempt on the life of Sinn Féin president Gerry Adams by the UDA which left him seriously wounded McCrea stated:

For years he has played with the sword and today he was on the verge of dying by the same sword. As one who believes in the death penalty, I do believe that the removal of Gerry Adams from this country would be a great bonus for law-abiding people.

In December 1986, McCrea aroused controversy when in an interview with Hot Press magazine following a recent threat by the "Ulster Freedom Fighters" (the UDA's cover name used to claim responsibility for attacks) to bomb Dublin, he commented that the Republic of Ireland "must reap what they sow" for its role in the Anglo-Irish Agreement. McCrea also claimed that the Agreement had come about because of IRA violence, and so people living in the Republic "must expect if they live by the sword they must die by the sword."

McCrea was the target of a parcel bomb to his home on 9 August 1988, when a package sent by the Irish People's Liberation Organisation was disarmed. McCrea had become suspicious when he noticed the package had a Dublin postmark. In September 1991, following the murder of Sinn Féin councillor Bernard O'Hagan by the UDA (who claimed the shooting under its outlawed "Ulster Freedom Fighters" cover name) in Magherafelt, County Londonderry, McCrea said "He who lives by the sword often dies by the sword" and "[O'Hagan] without apology stood for the policy of the Armalite in one hand and the ballot box in the other".

In February 1992, McCrea sent a message of sympathy to the family of RUC Constable Alan Moore, who had committed suicide after shooting dead three people and injuring two others at a Sinn Féin advice centre on the Falls Road, Belfast. Moore's family lived in Ballymena, outside McCrea's constituency; McCrea did not send any message of condolence to the families of the three Catholic men who died in Moore's attack.

McCrea was criticised when he appeared on a platform at a Portadown rally in support of the senior Ulster loyalist paramilitary Billy Wright, who had been threatened by the Ulster Volunteer Force (UVF) leadership, in September 1996. Wright was the founder and leader of the Loyalist Volunteer Force (which had broken away from the UVF), and had been threatened after he broke the UVF ceasefire by ordering the death of Catholic civilian Michael McGoldrick.

In 2000, McCrea was the subject of an early day motion by two MPs, Harry Barnes and Sir Peter Bottomley. The motion referenced a claim that McCrea had visited Wright's successor as LVF leader in order to persuade the LVF not to decommission any of its weapons. This claim has yet to be substantiated.

A Northern Ireland Office memo released under the thirty-year rule in December 2014 revealed that McCrea had called for the Royal Air Force to carry out "strikes against Dundalk, Drogheda, Crossmaglen and Carrickmore" at the DUP's annual conference in April 1986.

=== Alternative medicine ===
McCrea is a supporter of homeopathy, having signed several early day motions in support of its continued funding on the National Health Service, sponsored by Conservative MP David Tredinnick.

Northern Ireland Assembly (1982)
| New assembly | MPA for Mid-Ulster; 1982–1986 | Assembly abolished |
Parliament of the United Kingdom
| Preceded by John Dunlop | MP for Mid Ulster; 1983 – 1997 | Succeeded by Martin McGuinness |
| Preceded by Clifford Forsythe | MP for South Antrim; 2000 – 2001 | Succeeded by David Burnside |
| Preceded by David Burnside | MP for South Antrim; 2005 – 2015 | Succeeded by Danny Kinahan |
Northern Ireland Forum
| New forum | Member for Mid-Ulster; 1996–1998 | Forum dissolved |
Northern Ireland Assembly
| New assembly | MLA for Mid-Ulster; 1998–2007 | Succeeded by multiple members |
| Preceded by multiple members | MLA for South Antrim; 2007–2010 | Succeeded by Paul Girvan |
Orders of precedence in the United Kingdom
| Preceded by The Lord Lilley | Gentlemen; Baron McCrea of Magherafelt and Cookstown | Followed by The Lord McNicol of West Kilbride |
