= David Burnside =

British politician (born 1951)

Member of the Legislative Assembly for South Antrim
- In office 26 November 2003 – 1 June 2009
- Preceded by: Duncan Shipley-Dalton
- Succeeded by: Danny Kinahan

Member of Parliament for South Antrim
- In office 7 June 2001 – 11 April 2005
- Preceded by: William McCrea
- Succeeded by: William McCrea
- Majority: 1,011 (2.3%)

Personal details
- Born: David Wilson Boyd Burnside; 24 August 1951 (age 75) Ballymoney, Northern Ireland
- Party: Ulster Unionist Party (1978-2003, 2004-present)
- Other political affiliations: Independent Unionist (2003-2004); Vanguard Unionist Progressive Party (before 1978)
- Children: 2
- Education: Queen's University Belfast
- Profession: Businessman

Military service
- Allegiance: United Kingdom
- Branch/service: British Army
- Unit: Ulster Defence Regiment

David Wilson Boyd Burnside (born 24 August 1951) is a British politician who served as a Member of Parliament (MP) for South Antrim from 2001 to 2005 and a Member of the Northern Ireland Assembly (MLA) for South Antrim from 2003 to 2009.

In the 1970s, Burnside served as press officer for the Vanguard Unionist Progressive Party, and he unsuccessfully contested North Antrim for the party at the 1973 Northern Ireland Assembly election. After the collapse of Vanguard he joined the Ulster Unionist Party, standing unsuccessfully in the 1982 Northern Ireland Assembly but then took a back seat from politics for many years while working as a prominent public relations consultant based in London which led him to set up his own PR company. He also served in the Ulster Defence Regiment.

Since 2015 he has been a member of the Steering Committee of the Constitution Reform Group (CRG), a cross-party pressure group chaired by Robert Gascoyne-Cecil, 7th Marquess of Salisbury, which seeks a new constitutional settlement in the UK. The Constitution Reform Group's Act of Union Bill 2018 was introduced as a Private Member's Bill by Lord Lisvane in the House of Lords on 9 October 2018, when it received a formal first reading. The bill was described by the BBC as "one to watch" in the 2017-19 Parliament.

== British Airways ==
In 1984, Burnside was recruited by the British Airways Chairman John Leonard King to become the company's head of public relations. In this role, Burnside would speak for King, administer a £5 million budget and received numerous awards.

His success is perhaps overshadowed by the nature of his departure. British Airways was witnessing the emergence of a potentially strong rival, Richard Branson's Virgin Atlantic. Virgin, which began with one route and one Boeing 747 in 1984 was beginning to emerge as a serious threat on some of BA's most lucrative routes.

Following Virgin's highly publicized mission of mercy to Iraq to fly home hostages who had been held by Saddam Hussein in 1991, King is reported to have told Burnside and CEO Colin Marshall to "do something about Branson". This began the campaign of "dirty tricks", which ended in Branson suing King and British Airways for libel in 1992. King countersued Branson and the case went to trial in 1993. British Airways, faced with likely defeat, settled the case giving £500,000 to Branson and a further £110,000 to his airline; further, BA was to pay the legal fees of up to £3 million.

It was an article written by Burnside (given legal clearance) in BA News, the company's in house newsletter, that prompted Branson's legal action. Following the case Burnside was awarded a settlement of approximately £400,000 and free first class travel on BA for four years.

== Return to politics ==
Along with several prominent current Ulster Unionist politicians, Burnside was a member of the Vanguard Movement. He was press officer for the organisation from 1974 to 1977.

He was selected to defend the South Antrim constituency for the Ulster Unionists in a by-election in 2000, but narrowly lost to the Democratic Unionist Party candidate Rev. Willie McCrea.

However he reversed this defeat in the 2001 general election. Along with Jeffrey Donaldson (MP) and the Rev. Martin Smyth (MP), Burnside became an outspoken critic of his party leader, David Trimble's support for the Good Friday Agreement, arguing that the Provisional IRA's slow pace of decommissioning its arms meant that Sinn Féin, the political wing of the IRA, should not be allowed to serve in the power-sharing government.

On 23 June 2003, Burnside, Donaldson and Smyth resigned the UUP whip in the House of Commons, launching a strong attack on Trimble's leadership. The trio successfully fought off attempts to discipline them using the courts and in November 2003 both Burnside and Donaldson were elected to the Northern Ireland Assembly. However, Burnside declined to follow Donaldson when he resigned from the Ulster Unionist Party in December 2003. In 2005 he lost his Westminster Parliamentary seat. Burnside successfully retained his Assembly seat in March 2007. He declined to contest the 2005 leadership election.

Burnside resigned as an Assembly Member in June 2009 to concentrate on his business interests. His seat was taken by Antrim councillor Danny Kinahan.

David Burnside was revealed to have taken a group of prominent Russians, including a close ally of Vladimir Putin, to the 2013 Conservative summer fundraising party and introduced them to David Cameron.

== Rangers Football Club ==
Burnside was linked to a potential Rangers takeover in 2007 but nothing came of it. There was not enough investment available for the move.

== Sources ==
- Gregory, Martyn. Dirty Tricks: British Airways' Secret War Against Virgin Atlantic. London: Virgin, 2000. ISBN 0-7535-0458-8
- BBC Profile
- Glasgow Rangers Burnside Article
- Maiden Speech : House of Commons - 26 June 2001

Parliament of the United Kingdom
Preceded by William McCrea	Member of Parliament for South Antrim; 2001–2005	Succeeded by William McCrea
Northern Ireland Assembly
Preceded by Duncan Shipley-Dalton	MLA for Antrim South; 2003 – 2009	Succeeded by Danny Kinahan
