= Clifford Forsythe =

British politician

Member of Parliament for South Antrim
- In office 9 June 1983 – 27 April 2000
- Preceded by: James Molyneaux
- Succeeded by: William McCrea

Personal details
- Born: 24 August 1929 Glengormley, Northern Ireland
- Died: 27 April 2000 (aged 70) Belfast, Northern Ireland
- Party: Ulster Unionist Party
- Spouse: Lillian
- Children: 5

Clifford Forsythe (24 August 1929 – 27 April 2000) was an Ulster Unionist Party (UUP) politician who served as the Member of Parliament (MP) for South Antrim from 1983 until his death in 2000.

== Early life ==
Forsythe was born in Glengormley. He was a footballer with Derry City and Linfield Football Clubs. He won several footballing medals, and was described as a 'fine, speedy winger'.

== Career ==
He had previously been Mayor of Newtownabbey Borough Council, and was also a Member of the Northern Ireland Assembly from 1982 to 1986. He also once served as the President of the Northern Ireland Institute of Plumbing.

Forsythe was the constituency election agent for Ulster Unionist leader James Molyneaux, and later won the same seat, albeit with a reduced majority, in 1983.

In his paper Quangopus Government published by the Ulster Unionist Party in June 1992, Forsythe – as the then UUP Spokesman on Local Government – argued for devolution of responsibility to locally elected representatives.

In 1996, Forsythe survived an attempt to deselect him as an MP.

== Political views ==
Like Molyneaux, Forsythe opposed the Good Friday Agreement and supported proposals for a Northern Ireland-wide administrative assembly/regional council (with powers broadly analogous to the National Assembly for Wales) to administer legislation and public services that were, at that time, administered by Northern Ireland Office Ministers, civil servants and quangos.

On more than one occasion, Forsythe claimed that his experience – both in the 1982–86 Northern Ireland Assembly and as a Past Vice-chairman of the Ulster Monday Club – led him to conclude that the unimplemented 1979 Conservative General Election Manifesto commitment to administrative devolution in Northern Ireland offered the way forward for Northern Ireland.

He was an active member of the House of Commons' Social Security Select Committee from 1991 to 1997, and the Environment, Transport and the Regions Select Committee from 1997 until his death in 2000.

Shortly before his death, Forsythe criticised the Government for its failure to tackle social security fraud by paramilitary groups.

He argued that air travel between Great Britain and Northern Ireland should be exempt from air passenger duty, on the basis that the tax unfairly disadvantaged Northern Ireland compared with the rest of the United Kingdom given the limited alternative means of travelling between Belfast and London.

== Personal life and death ==
Forsythe, the father of five, was married twice; however, he was noted to be "intensely private" and did not discuss his personal life.

Forsythe died from complications of a heart attack and stroke at Royal Victoria Hospital, Belfast, on 27 April 2000, at the age of 70.

Civic offices
Preceded by C. W. Stringer	Mayor of Newtownabbey; 1982–1983	Succeeded by Leslie Caul
Northern Ireland Assembly (1982)
New assembly	MPA for South Antrim; 1982–1986	Assembly abolished
Parliament of the United Kingdom
Preceded by James Molyneaux	Member of Parliament for South Antrim; 1983 – 2000	Succeeded by William McCrea
