= South Antrim (UK Parliament constituency) =

Parliamentary constituency in the United Kingdom, 1950 onwards

Coordinates: 54.721°N 6.241°W

- County constituency for the House of Commons
- Boundary of South Antrim in Northern Ireland
- District: Antrim and Newtownabbey
- Major settlements: Antrim; Ballyclare; Randalstown

Current constituency
- Created: 1950
- Member of Parliament: Robin Swann (UUP)
- Created from: Antrim

1885–1922
- Created from: County Antrim; Lisburn
- Replaced by: Antrim

South Antrim is a parliamentary constituency in the House of Commons of the United Kingdom. The current MP is Robin Swann of the Ulster Unionist Party (UUP), first elected in the 2024 general election.

Map of current boundaries

== History ==
South Antrim is an overwhelmingly unionist constituency which once had the strongest vote for the Ulster Unionist Party anywhere in the province. From 1886 to 1974 the Conservative and Unionist members of the United Kingdom House of Commons formed a single Parliamentary party, and they continuously represented South Antrim.

In 1951, it was one of the last four seats to be uncontested in a British general election. In the 1979 general election, James Molyneaux had the largest majority of any MP in the entire of the United Kingdom, helped also by having one of the largest electorates.

The boundary changes in 1983 reduced the Ulster Unionist vote somewhat, with a significant portion now contained in the new Lagan Valley (which Molyneaux then contested) but the constituency still gave strong results for the party.

However, in April 2000 the Ulster Unionist incumbent, Clifford Forsythe, died suddenly. The ensuing by-election took place amidst a fierce political struggle between the Ulster Unionist Party and the Democratic Unionist Party over the Good Friday Agreement, an agreement that the UUP were themselves split over. The DUP had not contested the seat at the previous general election but on this occasion stood William McCrea, the former MP for Mid Ulster, who campaigned strongly on the DUP's refusal to co-operate with Sinn Féin in the absence of arms decommissioning by the IRA. The local UUP branch selected David Burnside to contest the seat who declared that he had supported the Good Friday Agreement at the time that it was signed but had since become disillusioned with its implementation. As a result, many commentators predicted that whatever the outcome of the election it was a severe blow for the UUP's leader David Trimble. On a low turnout amidst a fierce contest McCrea narrowly won the seat.

Burnside was nominated again to contest the seat in the 2001 general election in which he overturned McCrea's majority, aided by tactical voting by SDLP and Alliance voters. However the DUP were eager to regain the seat and in the 2003 Assembly election they outpolled the UUP by 298 votes. In the 2005 general election McCrea defeated Burnside in their third contest, but with a noticeably lower swing than those garnered by other DUP candidates who ousted UUP MPs. McCrea held the seat in the 2010 general election with a reduced majority. The seat was won by the UUP at the 2015 general election following the defeat of McCrea by Danny Kinahan. The DUP regained the seat following the 2017 general election with the defeat of Kinahan by Paul Girvan. Girvan would hold the seat until 2024, when Robin Swann, a former Health Minister who led Northern Ireland's response to the COVID-19 pandemic, retook the seat for the UUP on a 12.3% swing, giving them a seat in the Commons for the first time in 7 years.

== Boundaries ==
From 1885, this constituency was one of four county divisions of the former Antrim constituency. It comprised the baronies of Massereene Upper, Massereene Lower, that part of the barony Antrim Upper in the parish of Antrim, that part of the barony of Toome Upper not in the constituency of Mid Antrim, that part of the barony of Belfast Upper not in the constituency of East Antrim, and so much of the parliamentary borough of Belfast as was in the County of Antrim. It returned one Member of Parliament. In 1922, it was merged into a new Antrim constituency.

The seat was re-created in 1950 when the old Antrim two MP constituency was abolished as part of the final move to single-seat constituencies. The seat was reduced in size for the 1974 general election, with the town of Carrickfergus and the areas between it and Larne town transferred to North Antrim. Additionally some territory was transferred to Belfast West. Despite these changes, the seat had become the largest in the entire United Kingdom by the time of the Northern Ireland Assembly elections of 1982, by which time its electorate had passed the 131,000 mark. For the 1983 general election Northern Ireland received new seats. Consequently, South Antrim was significantly reduced, losing a lot of territory to the new seats of East Antrim and Lagan Valley as well as minor sections to Belfast West, Belfast North and Upper Bann. The new South Antrim which was fought for the 1983 election contained only 43% of the previous seat. In 1995 there were minor changes around the borders with North Belfast and West Belfast. The seat fought at the 2005 election encompassed the entirety of the district of Antrim and part of the district of Newtownabbey.

Following consultation of boundary changes across Northern Ireland, the altered South Antrim constituency fought at the 2010 general election is made up as follows:

- Glenavy from Lisburn City government area
- Ballyclare North, Ballyclare South, Ballyduff, Ballynure, Ballyrobert, Burnthill, Carnmoney, Doagh, Hawthorne, Mallusk, and Mossley, from Newtownabbey
- The district of Antrim

== Members of Parliament ==
Election	Member	Party
1885	William Ellison-Macartney	Conservative
1891	William Ellison-Macartney	Irish Unionist
1903 by-election	Charles Craig	Irish Unionist
1921	Charles Craig	Ulster Unionist
1922	constituency abolished	
1950	constituency recreated	
1950	Douglas Savory	Ulster Unionist
1955	Knox Cunningham	Ulster Unionist
1970	James Molyneaux	Ulster Unionist
1983	Clifford Forsythe	Ulster Unionist
2000 by-election	William McCrea	Democratic Unionist
2001	David Burnside	Ulster Unionist
2003	David Burnside	Independent Unionist
2004	David Burnside	Ulster Unionist Party
2005	William McCrea	Democratic Unionist
2015	Danny Kinahan	Ulster Unionist
2017	Paul Girvan	Democratic Unionist
2024	Robin Swann	Ulster Unionist

== Elections ==
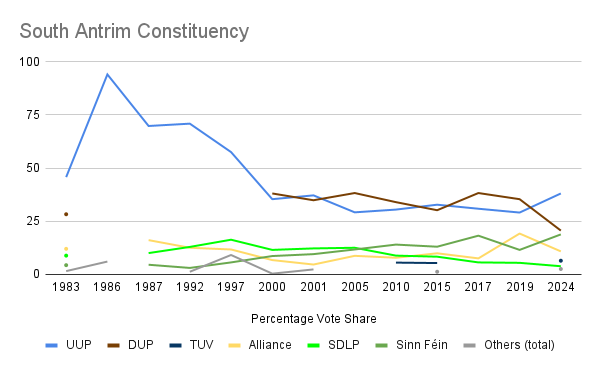
South Antrim election results

=== Elections in the 2020s ===
2024 general election: South Antrim
Party	Candidate	Votes	%	±%
UUP	Robin Swann	16,311	38.0	+8.9
DUP	Paul Girvan	8,799	20.5	−15.7
Sinn Féin	Declan Kearney	8,034	18.7	+7.3
Alliance	John Blair	4,574	10.7	−7.7
TUV	Mel Lucas	2,693	6.3	New
SDLP	Roisin Lynch	1,589	3.7	−1.3
Green (NI)	Lesley Veronica	541	1.3	New
Aontú	Siobhán McErlean	367	0.9	New
Majority		7,512	17.5	N/A
Turnout		42,908	55.7	−4.2
Registered electors		77,058		
UUP gain from DUP		Swing	+12.3	

=== Elections in the 2010s ===
2019 general election: South Antrim
Party	Candidate	Votes	%	±%
DUP	Paul Girvan	15,149	35.3	−2.9
UUP	Danny Kinahan	12,460	29.0	−1.8
Alliance	John Blair	8,190	19.1	+11.7
Sinn Féin	Declan Kearney	4,887	11.4	−6.7
SDLP	Roisin Lynch	2,288	5.3	−0.2
Majority		2,689	6.3	−1.1
Turnout		42,974	59.9	−3.4
Registered electors		71,743		
DUP hold		Swing	−0.6	

2017 general election: South Antrim
Party	Candidate	Votes	%	±%
DUP	Paul Girvan	16,508	38.2	+8.1
UUP	Danny Kinahan	13,300	30.8	−1.9
Sinn Féin	Declan Kearney	7,797	18.1	+5.2
Alliance	Neil Kelly	3,203	7.4	−2.4
SDLP	Roisin Lynch	2,362	5.5	−2.7
Majority		3,208	7.4	N/A
Turnout		43,292	63.3	+9.1
Registered electors		68,244		
DUP gain from UUP		Swing	+5.0	

2015 general election: South Antrim
Party	Candidate	Votes	%	±%
UUP	Danny Kinahan	11,942	32.7	+2.3
DUP	William McCrea	10,993	30.1	−3.8
Sinn Féin	Declan Kearney	4,699	12.9	−1.0
Alliance	Neil Kelly	3,576	9.8	+2.1
SDLP	Roisin Lynch	2,990	8.2	−0.5
TUV	Rick Cairns	1,908	5.2	−0.2
NI Conservatives	Alan Dunlop	415	1.1	New
Majority		949	2.6	N/A
Turnout		36,523	54.2	+0.3
Registered electors		67,425		
UUP gain from DUP		Swing	+3.1	

2010 general election: South Antrim
Party	Candidate	Votes	%	±%
DUP	William McCrea	11,536	33.9	−4.3
UCU-NF	Reg Empey	10,353	30.4	+1.3
Sinn Féin	Mitchel McLaughlin	4,729	13.9	+2.3
SDLP	Michelle Byrne	2,955	8.7	−3.7
Alliance	Alan Lawther	2,607	7.7	−0.9
TUV	Mel Lucas	1,829	5.4	New
Majority		1,183	3.5	−5.6
Turnout		34,009	53.9	−2.8
Registered electors		63,054		
DUP hold		Swing	−2.8	

=== Elections in the 2000s ===
2005 general election: South Antrim
Party	Candidate	Votes	%	±%
DUP	William McCrea	14,507	38.2	+3.4
UUP	David Burnside	11,059	29.1	−8.0
SDLP	Noreen McClelland	4,706	12.4	+0.3
Sinn Féin	Henry Cushinan	4,407	11.6	+2.2
Alliance	David Ford	3,278	8.6	+4.1
Majority		3,448	9.1	N/A
Turnout		37,957	56.7	−5.8
Registered electors		66,580		
DUP gain from UUP		Swing	+5.7	

2001 general election: South Antrim
Party	Candidate	Votes	%	±%
UUP	David Burnside	16,366	37.1	−20.4
DUP	William McCrea	15,355	34.8	New
SDLP	Sean A. McKee	5,336	12.1	−4.1
Sinn Féin	Martin Meehan	4,160	9.4	+3.9
Alliance	David Ford	1,969	4.5	−7.1
NI Unionist	Norman Boyd	972	2.2	New
Majority		1,011	2.3	−39.0
Turnout		44,158	62.5	+4.7
Registered electors		70,651		
UUP hold		Swing	−10.2	

2000 South Antrim by-election
Party	Candidate	Votes	%	±%
DUP	William McCrea	11,601	38.0	New
UUP	David Burnside	10,779	35.3	−22.2
SDLP	Donovan McClelland	3,496	11.4	−4.8
Sinn Féin	Martin Meehan	2,611	8.5	+3.0
Alliance	David Ford	2,031	6.6	−5.0
Natural Law	David H. Collins	49	0.2	−0.3
Majority		822	2.7	N/A
Turnout		30,567	43.0	−14.8
Registered electors		71,047		
DUP gain from UUP		Swing	−5.7	

=== Elections in the 1990s ===
1997 general election: South Antrim
Party	Candidate	Votes	%	±%
UUP	Clifford Forsythe	23,108	57.5	−13.9
SDLP	Donovan McClelland	6,497	16.2	+3.4
Alliance	David Ford	4,668	11.6	+0.7
PUP	Hugh Smyth	3,490	9.0	New
Sinn Féin	Henry Cushinan	2,229	5.5	+2.5
Natural Law	Barbara A. Briggs	203	0.5	New
Majority		16,611	41.3	−16.8
Turnout		40,195	57.8	−5.1
Registered electors		69,512		
UUP hold		Swing	−8.2	

1992 general election: South Antrim
Party	Candidate	Votes	%	±%
UUP	Clifford Forsythe	29,956	70.9	+1.1
SDLP	Donovan McClelland	5,397	12.8	+2.9
Alliance	John Blair	5,244	12.4	−3.6
Sinn Féin	Henry Cushinan	1,220	2.9	−1.5
Monster Raving Loony	Denis (Dino) Martin	442	1.1	New
Majority		24,559	58.1	+4.3
Turnout		42,259	62.9	+0.0
Registered electors		67,192		
UUP hold		Swing		

=== Elections in the 1980s ===
1987 general election: South Antrim
Party	Candidate	Votes	%	±%
UUP	Clifford Forsythe	25,395	69.8	+24.1
Alliance	Gordon Mawhinney	5,808	16.0	+4.1
SDLP	Donovan McClelland	3,611	9.9	+1.2
Sinn Féin	Henry Cushinan	1,592	4.4	+0.2
Majority		19,587	53.8	+36.3
Turnout		36,406	62.9	−2.6
Registered electors		61,649		
UUP hold		Swing		

1986 South Antrim by-election
Party	Candidate	Votes	%	±%
UUP	Clifford Forsythe	30,087	94.1	+48.4
"For the Anglo-Irish Agreement"	"Peter Barry" (Wesley Robert Williamson)	1,870	5.9	New
Majority		28,217	88.2	+70.7
Turnout		31,957	53.5	−12.0
Registered electors		60,780		
UUP hold		Swing		

1983 general election: South Antrim
Party	Candidate	Votes	%	±%
UUP	Clifford Forsythe	17,727	45.7	−23.3
DUP	Roy Thompson	10,935	28.2	New
Alliance	Gordon Mawhinney	4,612	11.9	−4.3
SDLP	Alban Maginness	3,377	8.7	−1.4
Sinn Féin	Sean H. Laverty	1,629	4.2	New
Workers' Party	Kevin Smyth	549	1.4	New
Majority		6,792	17.5	−35.3
Turnout		38,829	65.5	+7.3
Registered electors		59,233		
UUP hold		Swing		

=== Elections in the 1970s ===
1979 general election: South Antrim
Party	Candidate	Votes	%	±%
UUP	James Molyneaux	50,782	69.0	−2.5
Alliance	Charles Kinahan	11,914	16.2	+0.9
SDLP	Patrick Rowan	7,432	10.1	−3.1
United Labour	Bob Kidd	1,895	2.6	New
Republican Clubs	Kevin Smyth	1,615	2.2	New
Majority		38,868	52.8	−3.4
Turnout		73,638	58.2	+0.1
Registered electors		126,444		
UUP hold		Swing		

October 1974 general election: South Antrim
Party	Candidate	Votes	%	±%
UUP	James Molyneaux	48,892	71.5	+3.9
Alliance	Charles Kinahan	10,460	15.3	−2.3
SDLP	Patrick Rowan	9,061	13.2	+0.9
Majority		38,432	56.2	+6.2
Turnout		68,413	58.1	−3.0
Registered electors		117,834		
UUP hold		Swing		

February 1974 general election: South Antrim
Party	Candidate	Votes	%	±%
UUP	James Molyneaux	48,203	67.6	+6.4
Alliance	Charles Kinahan	12,559	17.6	New
SDLP	Patrick John Rowan	8,769	12.3	New
Independent	Bob Kidd	1,801	2.5	New
Majority		35,644	50.0	+9.3
Turnout		71,332	61.1	−6.9
Registered electors		118,483		
UUP hold		Swing		

1970 general election: South Antrim
Party	Candidate	Votes	%	±%
UUP	James Molyneaux	59,589	61.2	−3.1
NI Labour	Robert Johnston	19,971	20.5	−15.2
Ind. Unionist	Tom Caldwell	10,938	11.2	New
National Democratic	Daniel MacAllister	6,037	6.2	New
Ulster Liberal	Rodney Smith	913	0.9	New
Majority		39,618	40.7	+12.1
Turnout		97,448	68.0	+12.1
Registered electors		143,274		
UUP hold		Swing		

=== Elections in the 1960s ===
1966 general election: South Antrim
Party	Candidate	Votes	%	±%
UUP	Knox Cunningham	40,840	64.3	−5.6
NI Labour	Sydney Stewart	22,672	35.7	+11.3
Majority		18,168	28.6	−16.9
Turnout		63,512	55.9	−8.4
Registered electors		113,645		
UUP hold		Swing		

1964 general election: South Antrim
Party	Candidate	Votes	%	±%
UUP	Knox Cunningham	47,325	69.9	−25.2
NI Labour	Sydney Stewart	16,531	24.4	New
Ind. Republican	Leo Wilson	3,830	5.7	New
Majority		30,794	45.5	−13.7
Turnout		67,686	64.3	+5.0
Registered electors		105,304		
UUP hold		Swing		

=== Elections in the 1950s ===
1959 general election: South Antrim
Party	Candidate	Votes	%	±%
UUP	Knox Cunningham	52,786	95.1	+4.4
Sinn Féin	Michael Traynor	2,745	4.9	−4.4
Majority		50,041	90.2	+8.8
Turnout		55,531	59.3	−6.0
Registered electors		93,634		
UUP hold		Swing		

1955 general election: South Antrim
Party	Candidate	Votes	%	±%
UUP	Knox Cunningham	50,347	90.7	N/A
Sinn Féin	Michael Traynor	5,155	9.3	New
Majority		45,192	81.4	N/A
Turnout		55,502	65.3	N/A
Registered electors		84,939		
UUP hold		Swing		

1951 general election: South Antrim
Party	Candidate	Votes	%	±%
UUP	Douglas Savory	Unopposed		
Registered electors		79,533		
UUP hold				

1950 general election: South Antrim
Party	Candidate	Votes	%	±%
UUP	Douglas Savory	41,023	83.6	
NI Labour	Edward Brown	8,068	16.4	
Majority		32,955	67.2	
Turnout		49,091	63.3	
Registered electors		77,499		
UUP win (new seat)				

=== Elections in the 1910s ===
1918 general election: South Antrim
Party	Candidate	Votes	%	±%
Irish Unionist	Charles Craig	13,270	85.1	N/A
Sinn Féin	Kevin O'Shiel	2,318	14.9	New
Majority		10,952	70.2	N/A
Turnout		15,558	67.1	N/A
Registered electors				
Irish Unionist hold		Swing	N/A	

December 1910 general election: South Antrim
Party	Candidate	Votes	%	±%
Irish Unionist	Charles Craig	Unopposed		
Registered electors		9,900		
Irish Unionist hold				

January 1910 general election: South Antrim
Party	Candidate	Votes	%	±%
Irish Unionist	Charles Craig	5,310	69.41	N/A
Liberal	William Moffat Clow	2,340	30.59	New
Majority		2,970	38.82	N/A
Turnout		7,650	77.27	N/A
Registered electors		9,900		
Irish Unionist hold		Swing	N/A	

=== Elections in the 1900s ===
1906 general election: South Antrim
Party	Candidate	Votes	%	±%
Irish Unionist	Charles Craig	Unopposed		
Registered electors				
Irish Unionist hold				

1903 South Antrim by-election
Party	Candidate	Votes	%	±%
Irish Unionist	Charles Craig	4,464	55.25	+0.86
Russellite Unionist	Samuel Robert Keightley	3,615	44.75	New
Majority		849	10.50	+1.72
Turnout		8,079	78.93	+13.86
Registered electors		10,236		
Irish Unionist hold		Swing	N/A	

1900 general election: South Antrim
Party	Candidate	Votes	%	±%
Irish Unionist	William Ellison-Macartney	3,674	54.39	N/A
Ind. Unionist	Samuel Lawther	3,081	45.61	New
Majority		593	8.78	N/A
Turnout		6,755	65.07	N/A
Registered electors		10,381		
Irish Unionist hold		Swing	N/A	

=== Elections in the 1890s ===
1895 general election: South Antrim
Party	Candidate	Votes	%	±%
Irish Unionist	William Ellison-Macartney	Unopposed		
Registered electors				
Irish Unionist hold				

1892 general election: South Antrim
Party	Candidate	Votes	%	±%
Irish Unionist	William Ellison-Macartney	Unopposed		
Registered electors				
Irish Unionist hold				

=== Elections in the 1880s ===
1886 general election: South Antrim
Party	Candidate	Votes	%	±%
Irish Conservative	William Ellison-Macartney	Unopposed		
Registered electors		10,824		
Irish Conservative hold				

1885 general election: South Antrim
Party	Candidate	Votes	%	±%
Irish Conservative	William Ellison-Macartney	5,047	57.8	
Liberal	John Dougherty Barbour	3,680	42.2	
Majority		1,367	15.6	
Turnout		8,727	80.6	
Registered electors		10,824		
Irish Conservative win (new seat)				

== See also ==
- List of parliamentary constituencies in Northern Ireland
