= Mitchell-Thomson =

Mitchell-Thomson is a surname, and may refer to:

- Malcolm Mitchell-Thomson, 3rd Baron Selsdon (1937–2024), British banker and businessman
- Mitchell Mitchell-Thomson (1846–1918), British merchant and baronet
- Peter Mitchell-Thomson, 2nd Baron Selsdon (1913–1963), British racing driver
- William Mitchell-Thomson, 1st Baron Selsdon (1877–1938), Scottish politician and Postmaster-General

.
