= Baron Selsdon =

Barony in the Peerage of the United Kingdom

Baron Selsdon, of Croydon in the County of Surrey, is a title in the Peerage of the United Kingdom. It was created on 14 January 1932 for the Conservative politician Sir William Mitchell-Thomson, 2nd Baronet. His son, the second Baron, was a successful racing driver, winning the 1949 24 Hours of Le Mans in the first Ferrari (although his codriver, Luigi Chinetti, actually drove for all but one half-hour). The titles were then held by the second Baron's only son, the third Baron, who succeeded in 1963. He was one of the ninety elected hereditary peers that remain in the House of Lords after the House of Lords Act of 1999, till 2021, when he was removed due to non-attendance, under the provisions of the House of Lords Reform Act 2014. Lord Selsdon sat on the Conservative benches. Since 2024, the titles are held by the third Baron's only son, the fourth Baron. The Mitchell-Thomson Baronetcy, of Polmood in the County of Peebles, was created in the Baronetage of the United Kingdom on 26 September 1900 for the first Baron's father, Sir Mitchell Mitchell-Thomson, Lord Provost of Edinburgh from 1897 to 1900.

== Mitchell-Thomson Baronets, of Polmood (1900) ==
- Sir Mitchell Mitchell-Thomson, 1st Baronet (1846–1918)
- Sir William Lowson Mitchell-Thomson, 2nd Baronet (1877–1938) (created Baron Selsdon in 1932)

== Barons Selsdon (1932) ==
- William Lowson Mitchell-Thomson, 1st Baron Selsdon (1877–1938)
- Patrick William Malcolm Mitchell-Thomson, 2nd Baron Selsdon (1913–1963)
- Malcolm McEacharn Mitchell-Thomson, 3rd Baron Selsdon (1937–2024)
- Callum Malcolm McEacharn Mitchell-Thomson, 4th Baron Selsdon (born 1969)

The heir apparent is the current holder's son, the Hon. Alec Callum Mitchell-Thomson (born 2006)

== Arms ==
Coat of arms of Baron Selsdon
Crest A dexter hand couped at the wrist Proper grasping a crosscrosslet fitchee in bend sinister Gules. Escutcheon Per pale Argent and Gules between three mascles a stag's head cabossed all counterchanged. Supporters Two seahorses Proper crined Sable finned Or. Motto Deus Providebit (God Will Provide)

== Notes ==
Baronetage of the United Kingdom
Preceded by McConnell baronets	Mitchell-Thomson baronets of Polmood; 26 September 1900	Succeeded by Aird baronets
