= Luigi Chinetti =

Italian born racecar driver

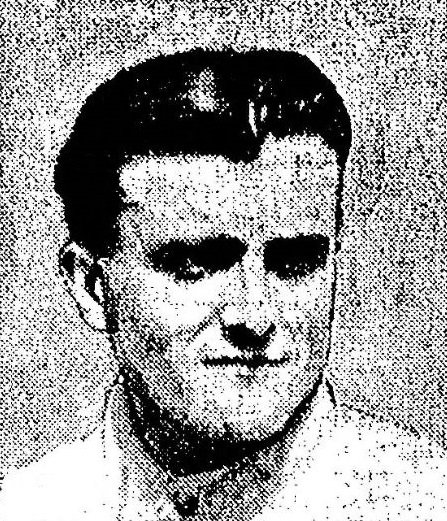
- Nationality: (Italy) Italian (United States) American
- Born: July 17, 1901 Jerago con Orago, Italy
- Died: August 17, 1994 (aged 93) Greenwich, Connecticut

24 Hours of Le Mans career
- Years: 1932–1935, 1937–1939, 1949–1953
- Teams: Raymond Sommer; Alfa Romeo; Private; Lord Selsdon
- Best finish: 1st (1932, 1934, 1949)
- Class wins: 3 (1932, 1934, 1949)

Luigi Chinetti (July 17, 1901 – August 17, 1994) was an Italian-born racecar driver, who emigrated to the United States during World War II. He drove in 12 consecutive 24 Hours of Le Mans races, taking three outright wins there and taking two more at the Spa 24 Hours race. Chinetti owned the North American Racing Team, which successfully ran privateer Ferraris in sports car and Formula One races. For many years he was the exclusive American importer of Ferrari automobiles to the United States.

== Biography ==
Chinetti was born in Jerago con Orago, a little north of Milan. The son of a gunsmith, he apprenticed in his father's workshop where he earned a lathe operator's certificate at age 12 and qualified as a mechanic at age 14. In 1917, at age 16, he went to work for Alfa Romeo as a mechanic, where he met another young hire named Enzo Ferrari. The rise to power of Benito Mussolini's National Fascist Party in his native country prompted a move to Paris where he worked for Alfa Romeo as a salesman.

Chinetti also began to race sports cars as a driver, earning a reputation in endurance events, the 24 Hours of Le Mans in particular. Driving cars from Alfa Romeo, Talbot, and Ferrari, Chinetti competed in every Le Mans race held between 1932 and 1953. He entered a car in the 1954 race, but as sponsor rather than driver.

Following the outbreak of World War II in Europe, Chinetti went to the United States of America. He traveled as part of the Lucy O'Reilly Schell Écurie Bleue team, that also included driver René Dreyfus, for an appearance at the 1940 Indianapolis 500. Chinetti remained in New York, getting approval to work at Pratt and Whitney and then supporting the Allied war effort at J. S. Inskip, working on Rolls-Royce engines in the same shop as Italian master mechanic Alfred Momo. Chinetti applied for American citizenship in 1947, and took the oath of allegiance on 6 March 1950. His naturalization was sponsored by Zora Arkus-Duntov.

When the war ended, Chinetti returned to Europe in late 1949. He first went to Paris, only to find that his property had been lost in the war. From there he carried on to Modena for a meeting with Enzo Ferrari, whose car factory had been converted to making machine tools for wartime production. The two men met on Christmas Eve in Ferrari's office. Some accounts of this evening describe a highly dramatic meeting between an uncertain and somewhat despondent Ferrari considering abandoning the making of sports cars, and a confident and enthusiastic Chinetti countering that Ferrari must stop making machine tools and resume building racing cars; that the race cars would be paid for by building road cars that Chinetti would sell in America; and placing an order then and there for 25 cars. Other sources point out that in June of that year, Ferrari had already begun building a new racing car; the 125. This new car would use an engine designed by Gioacchino Colombo in August 1945 and first fired on a test bench in September 1946, and that one month after that Ferrari issued a brochure outlining the types of cars he planned to build. It is also pointed out that, while Chinetti had been selling cars such as pre-war Alfas and Talbots to American customers from as early as 1946, he would not have then been in a position to commit to an order of the rumored magnitude. In either case, it seems that Chinetti left the meeting with an agreement to be Ferrari's agent in France and the United States.

As both an individual team owner and through N.A.R.T., Chinetti not only left a legacy of fielding some of the best drivers of the era, but of cultivating some of the highest quality up-and-coming talent, the two groups including names such as Stirling Moss, Mario Andretti, Phil Hill, Pedro and Ricardo Rodríguez, Graham Hill, and Jean-Pierre Jarier. One driver that Chinetti tried to promote was journalist Denise McCluggage. The three-time Le Mans winner submitted McCluggage's name as one of his drivers for Le Mans, but the application was denied. Chinetti was able to sponsor Yvonne Simon in the 1950 24 Hours of Le Mans partnered with Michel Kasse, and fielded the all-female team of Simon and Betty Haig at the 1951 24 Hours of Le Mans.

Chinetti Sr. sold his business in 1977. He remained in Greenwich, Connecticut after his retirement and died on 17 August 1994 at the age of ninety-three.

=== Ferrari ===
Enzo Ferrari appointed Chinetti as his Ferrari factory agent in the United States. Chinetti opened the first—and for a while the only—Ferrari dealership in the country. Later his territory became all areas east of the Mississippi River. Chinetti's reputation continued to draw clients from across the country throughout his career. In addition to handling Ferrari, Chinetti Motors was also U.S. agent for Automobili OSCA of Bologna until 1967. The original showroom of his Greenwich, Connecticut business has been demolished but the business with new location remains open, owned by Miller Motorcars, a Ferrari-Maserati dealership.

The first Ferrari sold by Chinetti to the US was a Tipo 166 MM Touring Barchetta, chassis 0002 M, sold to Tommy Lee in Los Angeles in the first three months of 1949. The second car sold, and the first sold through the dealership, was a Ferrari Tipo 166 Spyder Corsa, chassis 016-I, to Briggs Cunningham. Cunningham drove it to second place at Watkins Glen in 1949. That car ultimately ended up in Cunningham's motorcar museum. The third car was Tipo 166 MM Barchetta 0010 M sold to Kimberly-Clark tissue-paper fortune heir Jim Kimberly. Kimberly and the Ferrari appeared at some eastern events, but on 1 April 1951 with Marshall Lewis behind the wheel it would be the first Ferrari to race and win west of the Mississippi. In 1952 Chinetti sold 1951 Ferrari 212 Export Barchetta 0078E to Phil Hill near the beginning of the future World Champion's career. Chinetti would later hire Hill as a driver, and later still recommend him to Ferrari, who at first put him in sports-racing cars and later added Hill to their Formula One (F1) team. Most of Chinetti's other sales were kept secret to protect the privacy of his wealthy clients.

=== N.A.R.T. ===
Chinetti founded the privateer North American Racing Team (N.A.R.T.) with financial support from George Arents and Jan de Vroom. Chinetti's reputation and existing relationship with Ferrari guaranteed a supply of former works cars and support for many years. The team ran very successful endurance racing programs both at Sebring and Le Mans right into the 1970s.

Ferrari's F1 158s raced in N.A.R.T. blue and white for two races at the end of the 1964 season. When the FIA refused to homologate the Ferrari 250 LM for international sports car racing, Enzo Ferrari returned his competition license and vowed to never race in Ferrari Red again. With the championship on the line, Ferrari's cars appeared in N.A.R.T. colors for the 1964 United States Grand Prix at Watkins Glen, and again at the 1964 Mexican Grand Prix. By the start of the 1965 season the dispute was resolved, and the cars were painted red once again.

In addition to the racing cars, the team commissioned limited-run special variants of Ferrari road cars. One such project was the 275 GTS/4 NART Spyder. Left without a convertible model after production of the 250 GT California ended in 1962, Chinetti obtained factory permission to have coachbuilder Scaglietti convert a series of 4-cam 275GTB/4 coupés into open-top cars. Of a planned run of 25, only 10 are believed to have been built.

In the mid-1970s, Chinetti commissioned Giovanni Michelotti to begin a series of Ferrari Daytonas with heavily customized bodywork that would be called the Ferrari 365 GTB/4 Daytona NART Spider. The first was shown at the 1974 Turin Auto Show. The second conversion was chassis number 15965, and was built up as a racing car in anticipation of an appearance at the 1975 24 Hours of Le Mans, although the car was withdrawn before the race. In 1975 Chinetti ordered three more Michelotti conversions built to road car specifications. One of these three, chassis 14299, was completed in 1977 and then specially customized by Chinetti as a gift for his wife.

== Personal life ==
Chinetti married on 18 April 1942. He and wife Marion had one son; Luigi "Coco" Chinetti Junior.

On 27 July 1963, Luigi Jr. married Mamie Spears Reynolds (1942–2014), daughter of U.S. Senator Robert Rice Reynolds and Evalyn Washington "Evie" McLean. Reynolds was the first woman to qualify for the Daytona 500. Luigi Jr. and Reynolds divorced after two years.

== Racing career ==
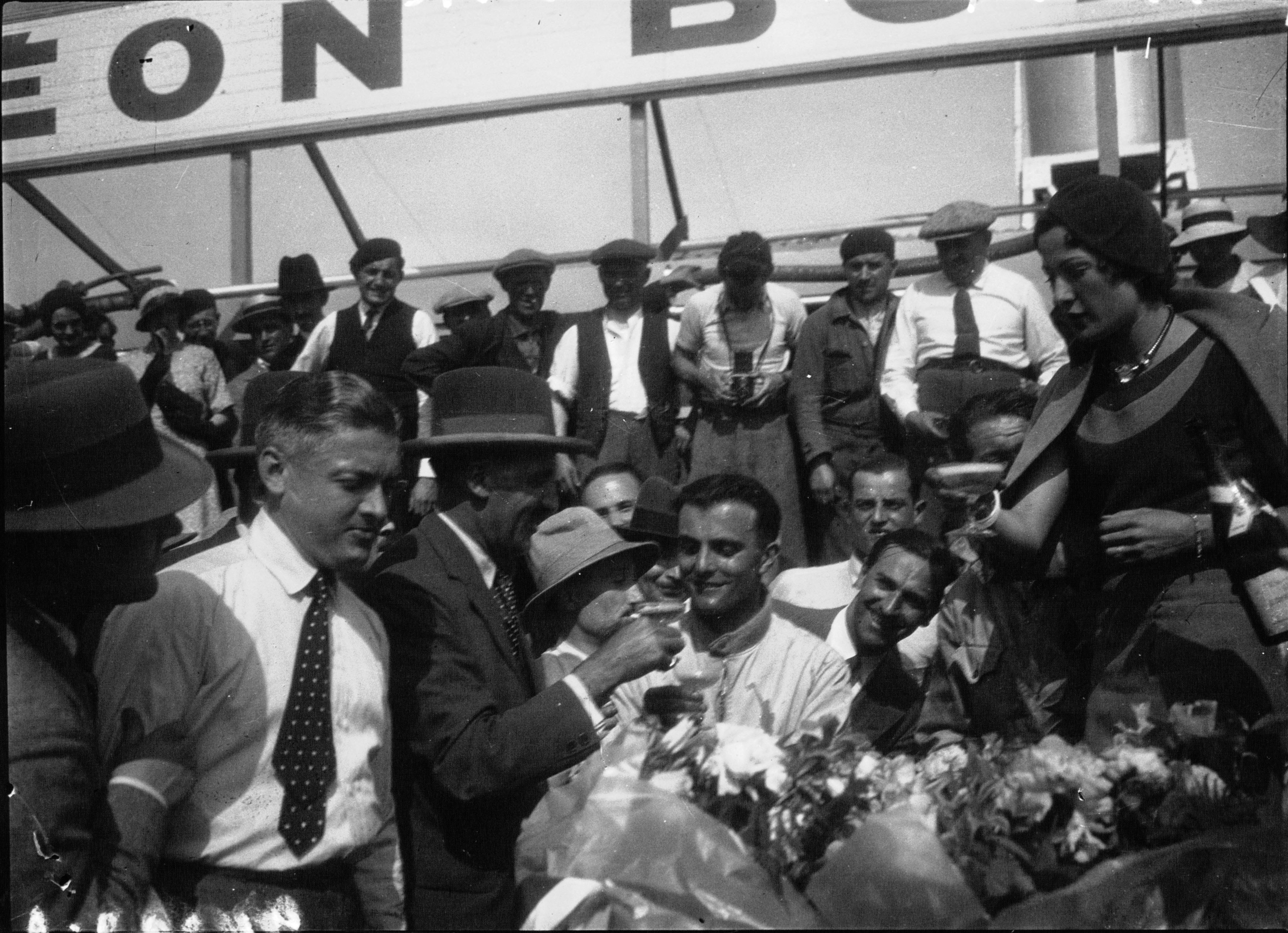
Chinetti winner of the 1932 24 Hours of Le Mans

Driving an Alfa Romeo race car entered by his co-driver Raymond Sommer, Chinetti won at his very first 24 hours of Le Mans race in 1932. The following year, with Louis Chiron as co-driver, he won the Spa 24 Hours endurance race in Belgium. He teamed up with Philippe Étancelin in 1934 to win his second 24 hours of Le Mans.

At the 1949 24 Hours of Le Mans race, Chinetti drove the first Ferrari ever to win the event, and became the second three-time winner of the race. The Ferrari 166M in which Chinetti won was turned over to Baron Selsdon of Scotland (Peter Mitchell-Thomson) for twenty minutes during the race, making Thomson the official co-driver although Chinetti had driven twenty-three of the hours of the race. Following the race, Thomson purchased that automobile through Chinetti.

Chinetti made three appearances at the Spa 24 Hours, taking outright wins in 1933 in an Alfa Romeo 8C 2300 partnered with Phillipe Varent, and again in 1949 in a Ferrari Tipo 166 MM driving for Ferrari with Jean Lucas.

Chinetti also posted wins at the Paris 12 Hours; once in 1948 in a Ferrari Tipo 166 SC, and again in 1950 in a Tipo 166 MM teamed with Jean Lucas.

In 1951, Chinetti was the riding mechanic in the Ferrari 212 that won the grueling Carrera Panamericana race, a 2,100-mile (3,400 km), five-day competition across Mexico. Chinetti appeared in the Carrera Panamericana three more times in subsequent years, with the highest finish being a third place in 1952.

== Racing record ==
=== Complete 24 Hours of Le Mans results ===
Year	Team	Co-Drivers	Car	Class	Laps	Pos.	Class Pos.
1932	(France) Raymond Sommer	(France) Raymond Sommer	Alfa Romeo 8C 2300 LM	5.0*	218	1st	1st
1933	(Italy) Soc. An. Alfa Romeo	(France) Philippe de Gunzbourg	Alfa Romeo 8C 2300	5.0*	233	2nd	2nd
1934	(Italy) Luigi Chinetti	(France) Philippe Étancelin	Alfa Romeo 8C 2300	3.0	213	1st	1st
1935	(Italy) Luigi Chinetti	(Monaco) Jacques Gastaud	Alfa Romeo 8C 2300	3.0	116	DNF	
1937	(Italy) Luigi Chinetti	(Monaco) Louis Chiron	Talbot T150C	5.0	7	DNF	
1938	(Italy) Luigi Chinetti	(France) Philippe Étancelin	Talbot T1500 SS Coupé	5.0	66	DNF	
1939	(Italy) Luigi Chinetti	(United Kingdom) Taso Mathieson	Talbot T26	5.0	102	DNF (Contact)	
1949	(United Kingdom) Lord Selsdon	(United Kingdom) Peter Mitchell-Thomson, Baron Selsdon	Ferrari 166MM	S2.0	235	1st	1st
1950	(United States) Luigi Chinetti	(France) Pierre Louis-Dreyfus	Ferrari 195 Sport	S3.0	121	DNF (Transmission)	
1951	(United States) Luigi Chinetti	(France) Jean Lucas	Ferrari 340 America	S5.0	246	8th	5th
1952	(United States) Luigi Chinetti	(France) Jean Lucas	Ferrari 340 America	S5.0	250	DSQ (Early refuel)	
1953	(United States) Luigi Chinetti	(United States) Tom Cole	Ferrari 340MM Spider	S5.0	175	DNF (Fatal accident - Cole)	
Sources:

- Note *: equivalent class for supercharging, with x1.4 modifier to engine capacity.

=== Complete 12 Hours of Sebring results ===
Year	Team	Co-Drivers	Car	Class	Laps	Pos.	Class Pos.
1950	(United States) Briggs Cunningham	(Italy) Alfredo Momo	Ferrari 195 S	S3.0	104	7th	1st

=== Complete Carrera Panamericana results ===
Year	Team	Co-Drivers/Navigator	Car	Class	Pos.	Class Pos.
1951	(Italy) Centro Deportivo Italiano	(Italy) Piero Taruffi	Ferrari 212 Inter Vignale	-	1st	
1952	(Mexico) Industrias 1-2-3	(France) Jean Lucas	Ferrari 340 Mexico Vignale Berlinetta	S	3rd	3rd
1953	(Italy) Scuderia Guastalla	(Spain) Alfonso de Portago	Ferrari 375 MM Vignale Spyder	S+1.6	DNF (Over time limit; engine)	
1954	(United States) John Shakespeare	(United States) John Shakespeare	Ferrari 375 MM Pinin Farina	S+1.5	6th	4th

=== World Sportscar Championship results ===
Season	Team	Race car	1	2	3	4	5	6	7
1953	Luigi Chinetti Scuderia Gustalla	Ferrari 340 MM Ferrari 375 MM	USA	ITA	FRA	BEL	DEU	UK	MEX
1953	Luigi Chinetti Scuderia Gustalla	Ferrari 340 MM Ferrari 375 MM			DNF				DNF
1954	John Shakespeare	Ferrari 375 MM	ARG	USA	ITA	FRA	UK	MEX	
1954	John Shakespeare	Ferrari 375 MM						6	

Preceded by Earl Howe; Tim Birkin	Winner of the 24 Hours of Le Mans; 1932 with: Raymond Sommer	Succeeded by Raymond Sommer; Tazio Nuvolari
Preceded by Raymond Sommer; Tazio Nuvolari	Winner of the 24 Hours of Le Mans; 1934 with: Philippe Étancelin	Succeeded by Johnny Hindmarsh; Luis Fontés
Preceded by Jean-Pierre Wimille; Pierre Veyron	Winner of the 24 Hours of Le Mans; 1949 with: Peter Mitchell-Thomson	Succeeded by Louis Rosier; Jean-Louis Rosier
