= Robert Lawrie =

- Nationality: British
- Born: 1903 Burnley, Lancashire, England
- Died: 1982 (aged 78–79)
24 Hours of Le Mans career
- Years: 1949, 1950, 1951, 1952
- Teams: Robert Lawrie; Private
- Best finish: 11th (1949 & 1951)
- Class wins: 0

Robert Lawrie (1903–1982) was a British alpine and polar equipment specialist and racing driver.

Robert Lawrie was born in Burnley. He trained as a shoe and boot maker at his father's firm which he later ran. By the late 1920s he had become an accomplished climber and alpinist, and he started to design, manufacture and supply mountaineering boots to his own design. His boots proved popular and he was commissioned to supply boots for the 1933 Everest expedition led by Hugh Ruttledge. In 1935 he moved the business, now known as Robert Lawrie Ltd, to London, eventually working out of premises in his home in Seymour Street. He provided boots, climbing and mountaineering equipment to many expeditions and Military Operations including John Hunt's successful 1953 Everest campaign, for which he trained Wilfrid Noyce in the art of boot repair. The shops' boots and his craftsmanship where also used in preparation and duringOperation Gunnerside during the Norwegian heavy water sabotage.

A keen amateur racing driver, he participated in four 24 Hours of Le Mans races, debuting on 25 June 1949. He finished in 11th position in the 1949 Le Mans driving his Aston Martin 2-Litre Sports (DB1) and also 11th in 1951 driving his Jaguar XK-120.

In 1959 the Lawrie Glacier on the west coast of Graham Land in Antarctica was officially named. The glacier was first mapped by the British Graham Land Expedition (1934–37) to which Robert Lawrie had supplied boots and equipment.
