= Peter Mitchell-Thomson, 2nd Baron Selsdon =

British peer and racing driver (1913-1963)

The Right Honourable The Lord Selsdon
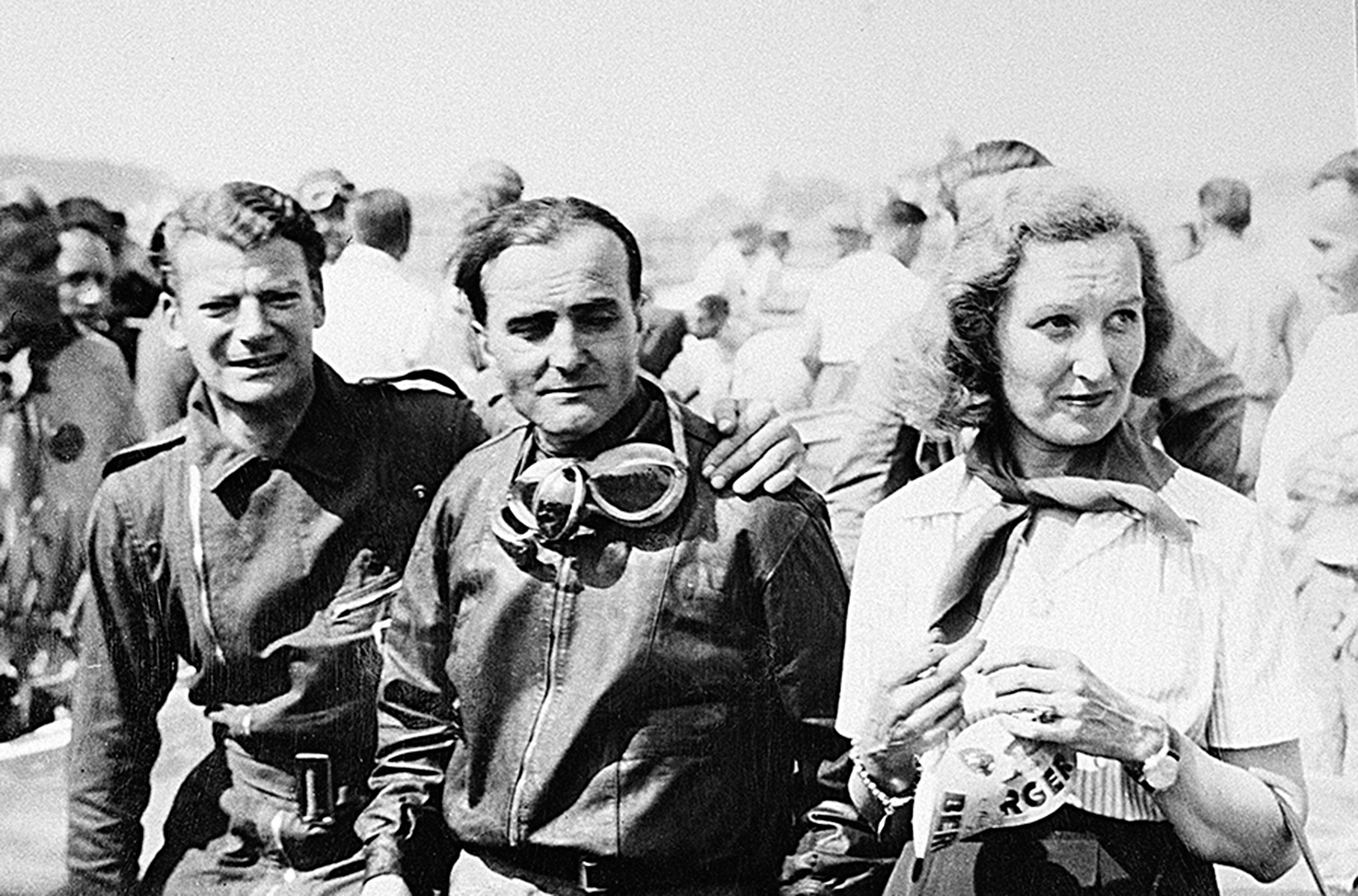
- From left: Selsdon, Luigi Chinetti and Marion Chinetti at Le Mans on 26 June 1949

Member of the House of Lords Lord Temporal
- In office 24 December 1938 – 7 February 1963; Hereditary Peerage
- Preceded by: The 1st Lord Selsdon
- Succeeded by: The 3rd Lord Selsdon

Personal details
- Born: 28 May 1913
- Died: 7 February 1963 (aged 49)
- Parents: William Mitchell-Thomson (father); Lady (Anne) Madeleine Mitchell-Thomson (mother)
- Relatives: Malcolm Mitchell-Thomson (son)

24 Hours of Le Mans career
- Years: 1935, 1939, 1949–1950
- Teams: Private
- Best finish: 1st (1949)
- Class wins: 1 (1949)

Patrick William Malcolm Mitchell-Thomson, 2nd Baron Selsdon (28 May 1913 – 7 February 1963), also known as Peter Mitchell-Thomson, was a British peer and racing driver won the 1949 24 Hours of Le Mans with Luigi Chinetti in a Ferrari 166 MM.

== Family ==
He was the only son of William Mitchell-Thomson, 1st Baron Selsdon (1877–1938), and his first wife, Madeleine McEacharn (1887–1946), also known as Anne. His grandfathers were Mitchell Mitchell-Thomson and Sir Malcolm McEacharn.

He married first, on 12 November 1936, Phoebette Swithinbank (1916 - 1991), with whom he had one son, Malcolm McEacharn Mitchell-Thomson, 3rd Baron Selddon (1937−2024). After their divorce, he married Effie Lilian Johnson, née Brennan (d. 1956), the following year.

== Racing career ==
=== Pre-war ===
Mitchell-Thomson's mother was an active supporter of British club racing, particularly for Frazer Nash. She provided competition cups for the Frazer-Nash car club. She entered an un-blown Frazer Nash for him to drive at Brooklands, and would stand in the pits opening golf umbrellas adorned with various symbols in order to pass information onto him during races. He finished seventh in the 1933 B.R.D.C. 500 Miles Race, and represented Oxford University in an inter-varsity race at the Brooklands finale later that year. He returned to "The 500" in 1934, retiring with engine troubles, and again in 1935, not classified as a finisher.

In 1934, Mitchell-Thomson led a team of three Frazer Nash drivers to fourth place in the Light Car Club's annual Relay Race at Brooklands. He was part of the Frazer Nash team on the 1934 Alpine Trial, a gruelling endurance test held over six days and 1,970 mi (3,170 km) from Nice to Munich, and helped the team secure second place in their group. He finished 6th in class and 15th overall in the Ulster Tourist Trophy. He was jointly awarded the Selsdon Bowl by the Frazer Nash Car Club for all-round performance in 1934.

In 1935, Mitchell-Thomson represented Oxford in the inter-varsity speed trials at Syston Park. At the Donington Meeting in August, he took part in two races but suffered brake troubles.

Under the direction of W. O. Bentley, Lagonda Ltd. redeveloped their V12 road car for the 1939 24 Hours of Le Mans. The 4 1/2-litre engine was tuned for a theoretical top speed of 142 mph (229 km/h) and the car weighed just 26 cwt (1,300 kg). Lagonda built two cars for the race; Mitchell-Thomson purchased one and entered with Lord William Waleran as co-driver. The team gave strict instructions not to exceed a pre-determined average speed based on the 1938 event, to ensure that the untried design went the distance. The cars did not challenge the likes of Bugatti and Delage, the former setting a new distance record, but impressed the British motoring press by securing third and fourth positions. Despite this promising performance, the outbreak of the Second World War prevented any further development of the model. Mitchell-Thomson piloted his Lagonda car to second place in the B.A.R.C. August Meeting at Brooklands, the last ever meeting at the circuit. He set the fifth-fastest lap of the meeting, averaging 128.08 mph (206.12 km/h). He travelled to Belgium for the Liège Grand Prix, scheduled for 27 August 1939 and held at the site of Expo 1939 Liège. He set the third-fastest practice time, but the event was cancelled due to the mobilisation of troops and war began within days. In October 1939, he was reported as being on the Police Reserve.

=== Post-war ===
In 1946, Mitchell-Thomson purchased a Talbot-Lago T26C, serial number 90202. He retired from the 1946 Coupe de la Résistance and made a shared drive with Yves Giraud-Cabantous in the 1947 French Grand Prix but retired with engine issues. He secured a reserve entry for himself in the 1948 British Grand Prix but this did not materialise into a full entry. He entered the Luton Hoo Speed Trials but withdrew from the event. He entered the car to other events with drivers such as Louis Chiron at the wheel. Mitchell-Thomson owned the car until at least 1949 and it was regularly seen in race meetings for many years after his ownership.

In 1949, Mitchell-Thomson purchased a Ferrari 166 MM and entered it for the 24 Hours of Le Mans alongside Luigi Chinetti. Recognising that Chinetti was the quicker driver, Mitchell-Thomson allowed him to drive most of the race, taking a single one-hour stint between 4:26 a.m. and 5:38 a.m. once a three-lap lead had been established. The strategy paid off and the duo took the first of twelve overall wins for Ferrari in the race. He returned in 1950 partnering Jean Lucas; the pair ran strongly until Lucas crashed out from sixth at around 8 a.m.

Mitchell-Thomson became one of the three directors of the HRG Engineering Company in 1947, fulfilling a desire to become involved with a car manufacturing company. He remained in this position until his death in 1963. In 1955, Mitchell-Thomson was reported as serving on the B.A.R.C. Committee.

=== The Sixty Mercedes ===
Mitchell-Thomson owned a 1903 Mercedes 60, once the fastest production car in the world, which he entered to many heritage races. It took part in several editions of the London to Brighton Run, and made an appearance at the 1937 Imperial Trophy at Crystal Palace. He competed with the car in the 1936 Tilburstow Hill Climb. The car later fell into disrepair until he sold it to Peter Hampton in 1953, who restored it and continued to enter it to competitions. It is thought that only four examples of the "Sixty" survive today.

=== Other appearances ===
Mitchell-Thomson made a cameo appearance in the Will Hay film Ask a Policeman, in which the main characters end up on the Brooklands circuit after a police chase and get mixed up in a motor race.

== Complete 24 Hours of Le Mans results ==
Year	Team	Co-Drivers	Car	Class	Laps	Pos.	Class Pos.
1935	(United Kingdom) M.T.U. Collier (private entrant)	(United Kingdom) Michael Collier	Frazer Nash TT Replica	1.5	77	DNF	
1939	(United Kingdom) Lord Selsdon (private entrant)	(United Kingdom) Lord William Waleran	Lagonda V12	5.0	239	4th	2nd
1949	(United Kingdom) Lord Selsdon (private entrant)	(United States) Luigi Chinetti	Ferrari 166 MM	S 2.0	235	1st	1st
1950	(United Kingdom) Lord Selsdon (private entrant)	(France) Jean Lucas	Ferrari 166 MM Berlinetta LM	S 2.0	164	DNF (Accident)	

== Arms ==
Coat of arms of Peter Mitchell-Thomson, 2nd Baron Selsdon
Crest A dexter hand couped at the wrist Proper grasping a crosscrosslet fitchee in bend sinister Gules. Escutcheon Per pale Argent and Gules between three mascles a stag's head cabossed all counterchanged. Supporters Two seahorses Proper crined Sable finned Or. Motto Deus Providebit (God Will Provide)

Peerage of the United Kingdom
Preceded by William Mitchell-Thomson	Baron Selsdon; 1938–1963	Succeeded by Malcolm Mitchell-Thomson
Sporting positions
Preceded by Jean-Pierre Wimille; Pierre Veyron	Winner of the 24 Hours of Le Mans; 1949 with: Luigi Chinetti	Succeeded by Louis Rosier; Jean-Louis Rosier
