= Aero Minor =

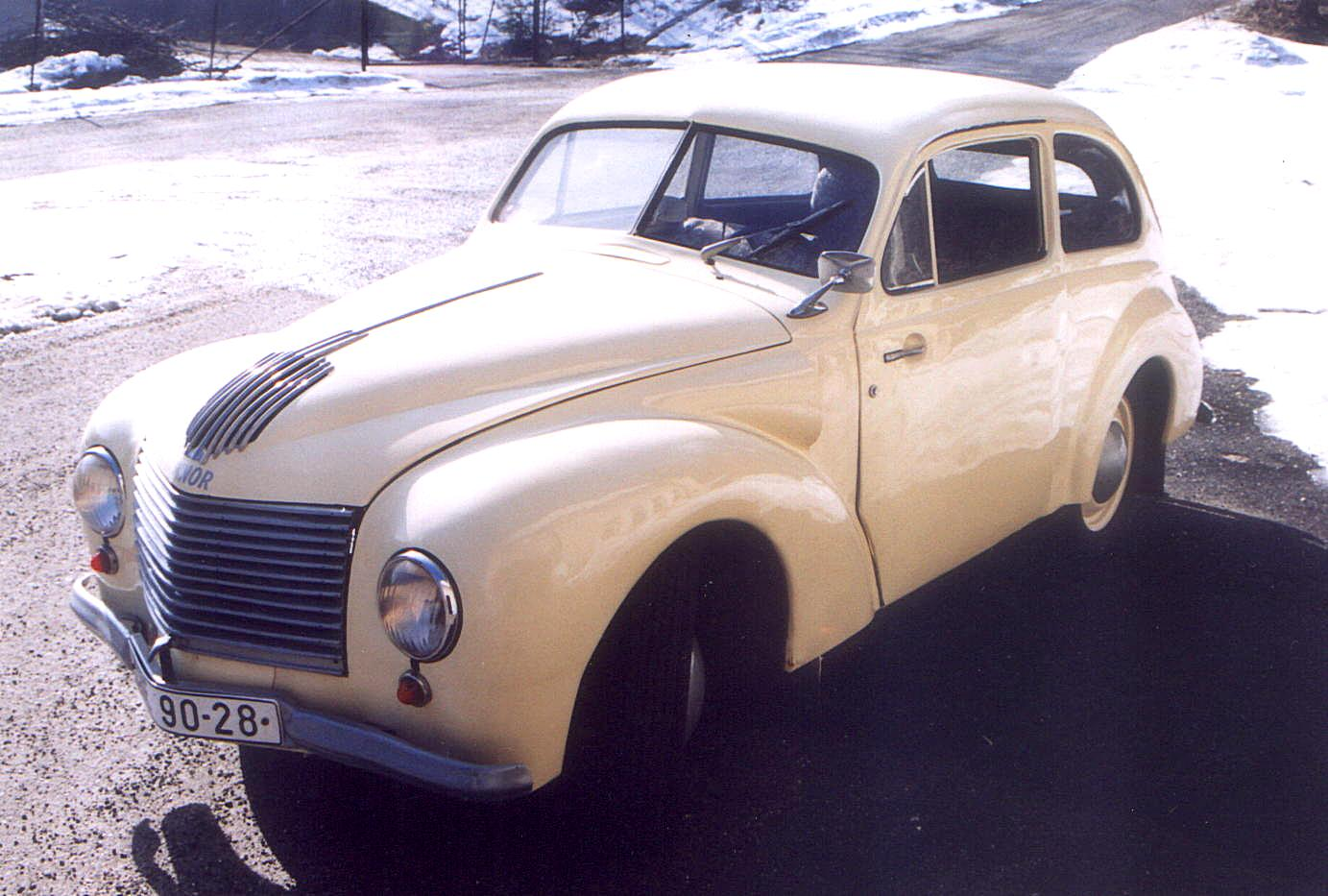
Aero Minor

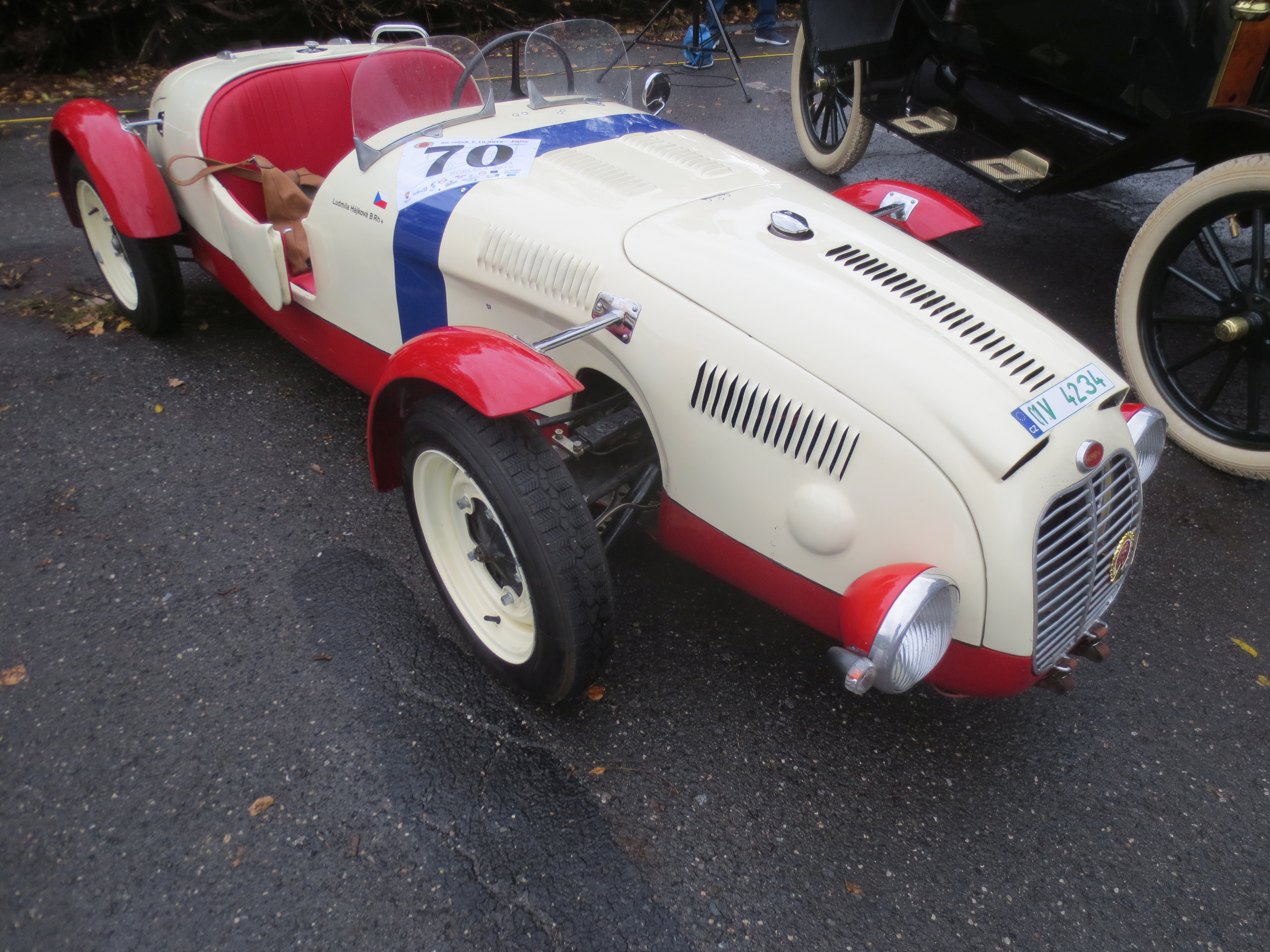
Aero Minor Sport

The Aero Minor is a Czechoslovak automobile that was manufactured by Aero from 1946 until 1952. It was designed by Jawa Motors engineers on their previous Jawa Minor design; they worked on it secretly during the German occupation of Czechoslovakia. It had a two-cylinder, two-stroke engine with 615cc displacement and front wheel drive. The car reached speeds of up to 90 km/h. The engine produced 20 hp and it had a fuel consumption of 8 L/100 km. It carried saloon and station wagon bodies.

The Aero Minor excelled in its time with its spacious body, quiet operation, low fuel consumption and long service life. A total of 14,178 cars were produced, half of the cars were exported to 23 countries, mainly to the Netherlands, Belgium, France, Sweden, Austria and Switzerland. Many long-distance and demonstration rides were undertaken with the Aero Minor. In 1947, the famous traveler František Alexander Elstner set out from Prague to Africa across the Sahara to the Gulf of Guinea and back. In 1948, another Aero Minor reached the Arctic Circle being the first car to reach these places in the winter.

The car was also successful in car competitions and on the racetrack. A sports version Aero Minor Sport competed at 24 Hours of Le Mans in 1949, where it took second place in its class. For racing purposes, the engine bore was enlarged, increasing the displacement to 744 cm3 and power increased to 23 kW (30 hp) at 5000 rpm. This race car was used by many successful Czechoslovak car racers.

== Sources ==
^ Hans-Otto Neubauer, "A.A.G.", in G.N. Georgano, ed., The Complete Encyclopedia of Motorcars 1885-1968 (New York: E.P. Dutton and Co., 1974), pp.28. Library of Congress Card No 68-22674.
