= 1910 North Down by-election =

UK Parliamentary by-election

The 1910 North Down by-election was held on 28 April 1910. The by-election was held due to the death of the incumbent Irish Unionist MP, Thomas Corbett. It was won by the Irish Unionist candidate William Mitchell-Thomson, who was unopposed.

1910 North Down by-election
Party	Candidate	Votes	%	±%
Irish Unionist	William Mitchell-Thomson	Unopposed		
Registered electors				
Irish Unionist hold				
