= William Mitchell-Thomson, 1st Baron Selsdon =

British politician

The Right Honourable The Lord Selsdon KBE PC
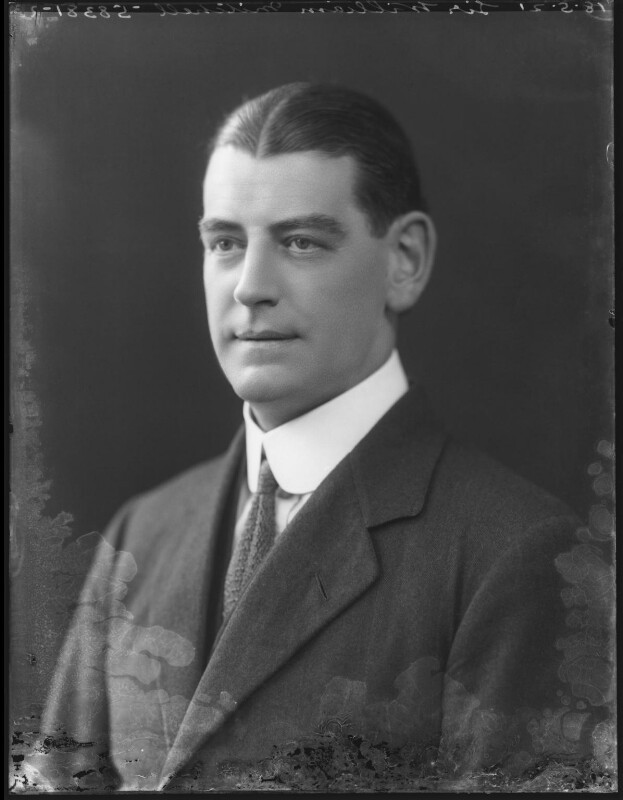

Postmaster General
- In office 4 November 1924 – 4 June 1929
- Monarch: George V
- Prime Minister: Stanley Baldwin
- Preceded by: Vernon Hartshorn
- Succeeded by: Hastings Lees-Smith

Parliamentary Secretary to the Board of Trade
- In office 1 April 1921 – 19 October 1922
- Monarch: George V
- Prime Minister: David Lloyd George
- Preceded by: Philip Cunliffe-Lister
- Succeeded by: The Viscount Wolmer

Parliamentary Secretary to the Ministry of Food Control
- In office 19 April 1920 – 1 April 1921
- Monarch: George V
- Prime Minister: David Lloyd George
- Preceded by: Charles McCurdy
- Succeeded by: Post abolished

Member of the House of Lords Lord Temporal
- In office 14 January 1932 – 24 December 1938; Hereditary Peerage
- Preceded by: Peerage created
- Succeeded by: The 2nd Lord Selsdon

Member of Parliament for Croydon South
- In office 6 December 1923 – 14 January 1932
- Preceded by: Allan Macgregor Smith
- Succeeded by: Herbert Williams

Member of Parliament for Glasgow Maryhill
- In office 14 December 1918 – 26 October 1922
- Preceded by: Constituency created
- Succeeded by: John William Muir

Member of Parliament for North Down
- In office 28 April 1910 – 25 November 1918
- Preceded by: Thomas Lorimer Corbett
- Succeeded by: Thomas Watters Brown

Member of Parliament for North West Lanarkshire
- In office 8 February 1906 – 10 February 1910
- Preceded by: Charles Mackinnon Douglas
- Succeeded by: William Pringle

Personal details
- Born: 15 April 1877 Edinburgh, Scotland
- Died: 24 December 1938 (aged 61) London, England
- Party: Scottish Unionist; Irish Unionist; Conservative
- Spouse: Annie McEacharn
- Children: Peter

William Lowson Mitchell-Thomson, 1st Baron Selsdon KBE PC (15 April 1877 – 24 December 1938), known as Sir William Mitchell-Thomson, 2nd Baronet, from 1918 to 1932, was a Scottish politician who served as British Postmaster-General from 1924 till 1929.

== Biography ==
Mitchell-Thomson was born at number 7 Carlton Terrace, Edinburgh, the son of Mitchell Mitchell-Thomson, Lord Provost of Edinburgh, who was created a baronet in 1900.

Mitchell-Thomson was educated at Winchester College and Balliol College, Oxford. He earned his LL.B with distinction from the University of Edinburgh in 1902. He joined the Scottish bar that same year, but spent several years traveling before returning to Scotland.

He was elected as a Unionist Member of Parliament for North West Lanarkshire in 1906, serving until his defeat at the January 1910 general election. He was an Irish Unionist Party MP for North Down from April 1910 until 1918.

During the First World War, he served as Director of Restriction of Enemy Supplies. He was appointed a Commander of the Order of the British Empire in the 1918 New Year Honours.

Following the War, he was appointed the British representative on the Supreme Economic Council, followed by appointments as Parliamentary Secretary to the Ministry of Food and the Board of Trade.

He was then MP for Glasgow Maryhill between 1918 and 1922, and Conservative MP for Croydon South, South London from 1923 to 1932.

In 1922, Mitchell-Thomson was Parliamentary Secretary to the Board of Trade and from 1924 until 1929, he served as Postmaster General. During the General Strike of 1926, he served as Chief Civil Commissioner. He was made a Privy Counsellor in 1924.

In 1932, Mitchell-Thomson resigned from the House of Commons and was raised to the peerage as Baron Selsdon, of Croydon in the County of Surrey.

In May 1934 the British government appointed a committee, under the guidance of Lord Selsdon, to begin enquiries into the viability of setting up a public television service, with recommendations as to the conditions under which such a service could be offered. The results of the Selsdon Report were issued as a single Government White Paper in January of the following year. The BBC was to be entrusted with the development of television. Lord Selsdon was one of those to appear on the first day of BBC television broadcasts, 2 November 1936, now in his new capacity as Chairman of the Television Advisory Committee.

== Personal life ==
Mitchell-Thomson was twice married. In 1907, he first married Madeleine, daughter of Sir Malcolm McEacharn, who was also known as Anne. They had a daughter who died in infancy, and a son, Peter. The marriage ended in divorce in 1932. The next year, he married Effie Lilian Loder Johnson, who as Effie Cook was a member of Pelissier's Follies.

Lord Selsdon died at his home in 20 Grosvenor Square, London, in December 1938, aged 61. He was cremated at Golders Green Crematorium, and his ashes were later buried in Edinburgh. His eldest son Peter, who became a well-known racing driver, succeeded him in his titles.

== Arms ==
Coat of arms of William Mitchell-Thomson, 1st Baron Selsdon
Crest A dexter hand couped at the wrist, Proper grasping a crosscrosslet fitchee in bend sinister Gules. Escutcheon Per pale Argent and Gules between three mascles a stag's head cabossed all counterchanged. Supporters Two seahorses, Proper crined Sable finned Or. Motto Deus Providebit (God Will Provide)

Parliament of the United Kingdom
Preceded by Charles Mackinnon Douglas	Member of Parliament for North West Lanarkshire; 1906 – January 1910	Succeeded by William Pringle
Preceded by Thomas Lorimer Corbett	Member of Parliament for North Down; 1910–1918	Succeeded by Thomas Watters Brown
New constituency	Member of Parliament for Glasgow Maryhill; 1918–1922	Succeeded by John Muir
Preceded by Allan Smith	Member of Parliament for Croydon South; 1923–1932	Succeeded by Herbert Williams
Political offices
Preceded by Vernon Hartshorn	Postmaster General; 1924–1929	Succeeded by Hastings Lees-Smith
Peerage of the United Kingdom
New creation	Baron Selsdon; 1932–1938	Succeeded by Peter Mitchell-Thomson
Baronetage of the United Kingdom
Preceded by Mitchell Mitchell-Thomson	Baronet (of Polmood); 1918–1932	Succeeded by Peter Mitchell-Thomson
