= 1949 24 Hours of Le Mans =

17th 24 Hours of Le Mans endurance race

Previous: 1939	Next: 1950
Index: Races | Winners

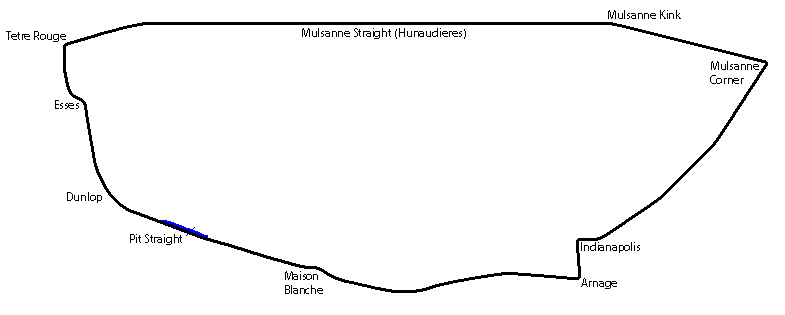
Le Mans in 1949

The 1949 24 Hours of Le Mans was the 17th Grand Prix of Endurance, and took place on 25 and 26 June 1949. Luigi Chinetti won the race for a third time in the first Ferrari barchetta by driving 22.5 hours. This race also saw the death of British driver Pierre Maréchal when his Aston Martin DB2 was involved in an accident between Arnage and Maison Blanche around 1:00 P.M. with twenty-one hours run. Marechal had attempted to pass another car there and he hit an embankment and the hapless Briton was crushed by the overturning car.

This was the first race held at the circuit following the end of World War II. Even though the war had ended four years prior, major infrastructure reconstruction throughout France meant that the return of the race was of secondary concern, and thus was not run until after France had established itself again. Following the end of the war the circuit needed extensive repairs. During the war the RAF, then the Luftwaffe, had used the airfield by the pits, as well as the 5 km Hunaudières straight as a temporary airstrip (thereby also making it a target for Allied bombing). So it was four years before the Automobile Club de l'Ouest (ACO) was in a position to revive the great race. Assisted with money from the government, the pits and grandstand had been rebuilt, a new 1000-seat restaurant and administration centre built and the whole track was resurfaced. However one section of the hinterland was still off-limits as it had not yet been cleared of landmines. Likewise, in that time the car manufacturers had also been rebuilding.

== Regulations ==
Most of the entry list for this year's race was from cars built or designed before the war. The ACO put preference to those entered in the last, 1939, race for the Biennial Cup. So there were twelve cars from that race back for the Cup. Otherwise, there were fourteen entries from manufacturers - although "works" entries effectively, many were one-car small companies.

The regulations used by the ACO were based on those of the new FIA, created in 1946. There were ten classes, based on engine size, and at least ten cars had to have been produced before the entry was submitted. Supercharged engines’ equivalence was calculated at 2:1 for engine capacity. However, for this new start, sportscar prototypes were now given admission for the first time, "as an exceptional measure to contribute towards a faster revival of automobile manufacture" by the French Service des Mines (Vehicle registration authority), or its foreign equivalent That was, in a sense, just formalising an unofficial practice started in the 1930s, when race-specific cars were entered at Le Mans and other races for the win with no intentions of going into full production. The ACO reserved the right to disqualify a car not entered 'in the spirit of the regulations'.

In days of petrol rationing, there was considerable interest in the Index of Performance - the measure of cars making an improvement on its nominal assigned distance, based on engine size. Entrants had to choose to run on either gasoline (68-Octane), diesel or ‘’ternary’’ fuel (a blend of 60% gasoline, 25% ethanol, 15% benzole). All fuel was supplied by the ACO. Fuel, oil and water could only be topped up after 25 laps had been run, and ACO inspectors sealed the radiator and oil-caps after each refill. A spare wheel, fire extinguisher and toolkit had to be carried in the car and on-circuit repairs could only be done by the driver, with the onboard tools. Night-time (when it was compulsory for lights to be on) was defined as being between 9.30pm and 4.30am.

Finally there was the Hors Course rule, whereby after 12 hours, any car that had not completed 80% of its corresponding Performance Index distance was disqualified. Also, the car had to be running to take the chequered flag with a final lap taking no longer than 30 minutes.

Prizemoney still overwhelmingly favoured the Index of Performance, awarding FF1,000,000 to that competition's winner (equivalent to about €23000 currently), whereas only 10% of that - FF100,000 was awarded to the winners on overall distance and of the Biennial Cup. FF10,000 was awarded to the leader at the end of each hour, increasing to FF25,000 at the 6-hour mark, FF50,000 at 12-hours, FF100,000 at 18-hours and FF200,000 at the 24th hour. So a car leading start-to-finish would still only reap FF675,000 compared to the Index of Performance. There was also a FF50,000 prize with the Coupe des Dames for the top female driver.

== Entries ==
From a staggering initial list of over a hundred prospective entries, the ACO trimmed the field down to 49 starters. There were 18 cars in the S3000 and S5000 categories - 15 French and 3 British cars. These included 3 Talbots, 7 Delahayes, 4 Delages and a Delettrez, driven by its constructor brothers – the first diesel-engined car to compete at Le Mans, using an engine from an American Army GMC truck. The Talbot-Lagos included the two biggest cars in the field: a new SS saloon for André Chambas’ Ecurie Verte team, and a 2-seater sportscar modified from the current T26 grand-prix car for Paul Vallée's works-supported Ecurie France team. Both used the new 4.5L straight-6 engine, developing 240 bhp. The third Talbot was a modified pre-war T150C raced by the very capable father-and-son Rosier team.

Most French hopes rested on the Delahayes: there were two new 4.5L 175 S raced by Parisian car-dealer Charles Pozzi (himself teamed with 1938 winner Eugène Chaboud), as well as five privately entered pre-war type 135 CS (a sports-car version of the 135 S grand prix car, and race-winner in 1938), running the smaller 3.6-litre 160 bhp engine.

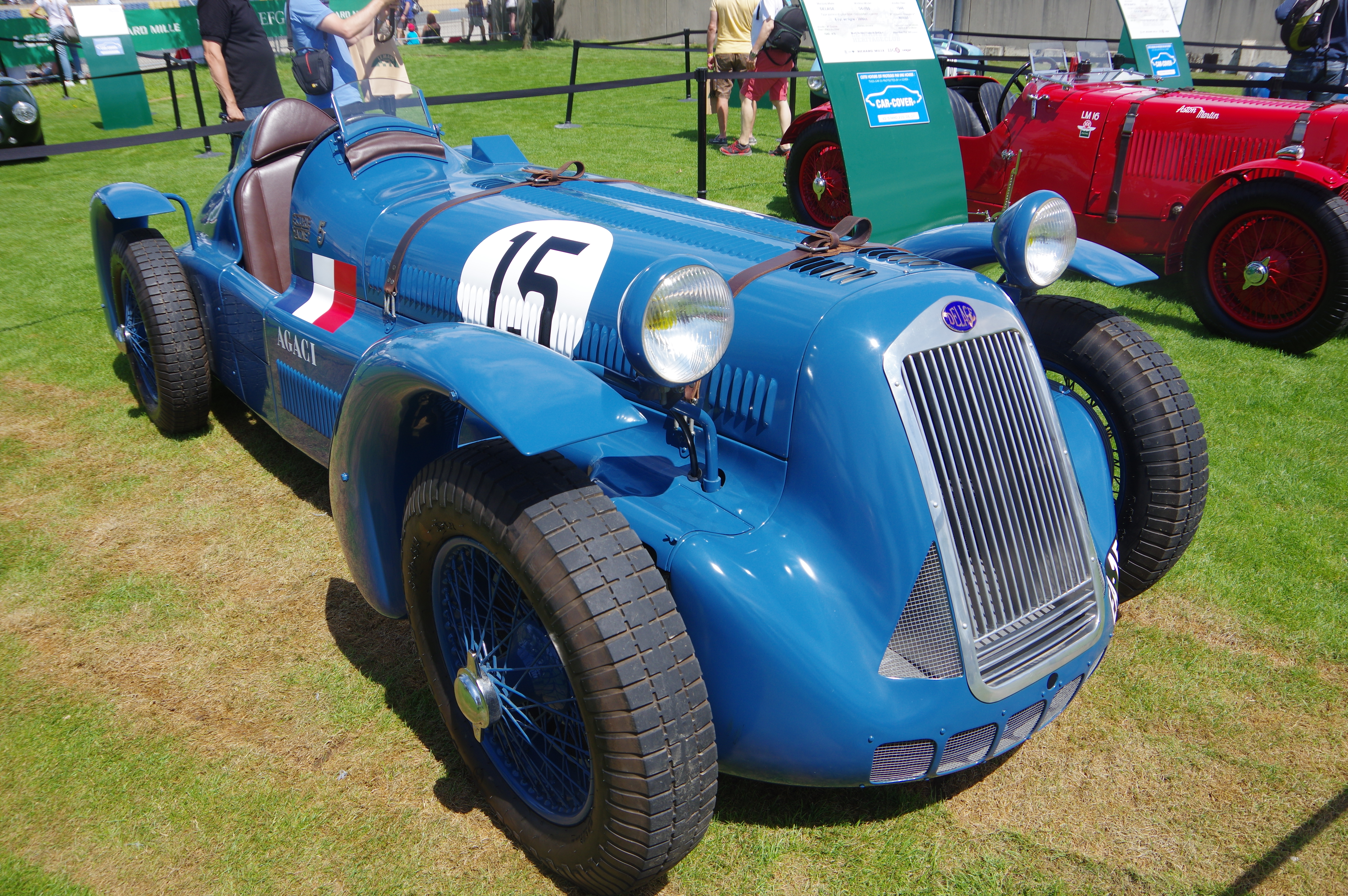
Delage D6 of Versini and Serraud, which retired due to engine failure

Delage was represented by four D6S cars, all privately entered, built just after war's end in the Delahaye factory but based on a pre-war chassis and the old 3.0-litre, 145 bhp engine.

The three British cars were a 2.4L Healey Elliott saloon driven to and from the race from England, a unique 1938 Bentley sedan originally designed for the Greek tycoon Nico Embiricos, and a brand-new Aston Martin DB2 prototype, with a 2.6L Lagonda engine designed by W.O. Bentley

The middle categories (S2000 and S1500) numbered 16 cars. In retrospect, the biggest news was the arrival of an Italian newcomer: Enzo Ferrari was represented by two racing versions of his first production car, with a two-litre V12 developing 140 bhp and a top speed of 210 km/h. He had been Alfa Romeo's team manager in the 1930s but was now a constructor in his own right. However, not confident of the car's reliability, Ferrari had not entered instead the pair were privately entered. Both had recently been purchased after gaining success in the Mille Miglia.

Entered from Great Britain were a new Frazer-Nash ‘High-Speed’, driven by British motorcycle ace Norman Culpan, and company owner Harold Aldington and a works trio of lightened HRG 1500s (co-organised by future Gulf team manager John Wyer). David Brown, who had recently purchased Aston Martin and Lagonda, fielded three works prototypes – the aforementioned 2.6L DB2 and two 2.0L versions. Three privately entered Astons also took the start, including two pre-war models.

A number of small specialist sportscar companies started up in post-war France, and two of the most significant were those of Amédée Gordini, and Charles Deutsch/René Bonnet. Overcommitted in 1949, the 1500cc Gordinis didn't make the start, but two new DB cars were present – one driven by the team owners themselves.

Finally, there were 15 cars in the small classes (S1100 & S750). A traditional rivalry was started between the Monopoles, Simcas, Gordinis (and later DBs in this class) all using Citroen, Simca or Panhard engines at various times, all vying for the Index of Performance prize. Under the ‘prototype’ provision, a half-dozen Simcas were entered with a variety of bodystyles and one of those (for Mahé/Crovetto ) was installed with the race's first pit/car radio, as pioneered in American motor-racing.

The other new international marque in the race were two Aero-Minors with 745cc two-stroke engines from Czechoslovakia (one of which had to drive all the way to the race from Prague after its truck-transporter broke down). A privately entered Renault 4CV was the first rear-engined car to race at Le Mans.

== Practice ==
As was usual, the cars were numbered in order of their engine size, the big Talbot-Lago of Chambas and Morel having #1. There was no grid based on practice time, instead the cars would be lined up, in echelon, in numerical order for the iconic “Le Mans start”. It was Louis Rosier in his Talbot T150 who recorded the fastest lap in practice. Jean Lucas badly damaged the Dreyfus Ferrari avoiding a child who had wandered onto the circuit during the practice. Tireless work overnight got the car repaired just in time to take the start.

== Race ==
=== Start ===
The race started at 4pm in blazing hot sunshine, and Pozzi's new Delahaye sports-cars took off into a handy lead. At the end of the first hour, Chaboud and Flahaut led in the Delahayes, from Dreyfus, Rosier, Chinetti, and Vallée in one of the big Talbots. The pace of the leading Delahayes was frantic; in the second hour André Simon set the fastest lap of the race. Soon after, Rosier came to a stop at Arnage after 21 laps, his car overheating. However, because it was before the 25-lap minimum he was not allowed to refill the water and became an early retirement.

Four hours in, Chaboud still led from Flahault, with the Ferraris of Chinetti (now up to 3rd) & Dreyfus just behind. Yet barely half an hour later, just before dusk, Chaboud, with a big lead, stopped at Mulsanne with an engine fire, burning out the electrics. The sister car of André Simon briefly took over the lead, until he also started having problems with overheating dropping him down to 18th, and was overtaken by the Ferrari.

=== Night ===
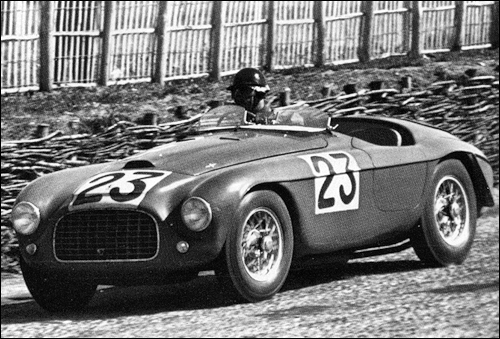
Ferrari 166 MM of Lucas and Dreyfus during the race, before they retired due to a serious crash

Chinetti stayed in the car through the night, as Mitchell-Thompson was not feeling well. When he pitted, Dreyfus took over at the front but then just before 10pm Dreyfus crashed heavily and rolled near the Maison Blanche corner when trying to overtake two cars at once. The driver was uninjured but the car was wrecked. This time it was the Talbot-Lago of Mairesse / Vallée that inherited the lead ahead of Chinetti. Through attrition, the Delage of Veuillet/Mouche and the Culpan/Alderton Frazer-Nash had risen to 3rd and 4th respectively.

At midnight, Chinetti had a narrow lead from Mairesse and Veuillet – all on the same lap. Fourth was Louveau's Delage, then the Frazer-Nash, Gérard's Delage and the Delahaye of Tony Rolt (in his first Le Mans). The leading Aston Martin (of Maréchal/Mathieson) was running in 8th and the brand new “works” DB-5 of Deutsch/Bonnet had moved up into 10th. In the early hours, the Mairesse Talbot retired with engine trouble, and Veuillet's Delage arrived at the pits with an engine-fire, thus allowing Gérard's Delage and the DB to move up the order, and the other big Talbot up into the top-10. Also moving up the leader-board was the Pozzi Delahaye of Simon/Flahaut, having been driven hard though the night back into contention.

=== Morning ===
Finally at 4.30am, as dawn broke, Chinetti came into the pits with a three-lap lead and handed over the Ferrari to Mitchell-Thompson. He managed just 72 minutes before having to hand it back to Chinetti for the rest of the race. But the hard racing was taking its toll on the new car, and Chinetti was now having to nurse a slipping clutch. The chasing pack was now led by the Delages of Louveau and Gérard, who gradually closed in on the exhausted Chinetti.

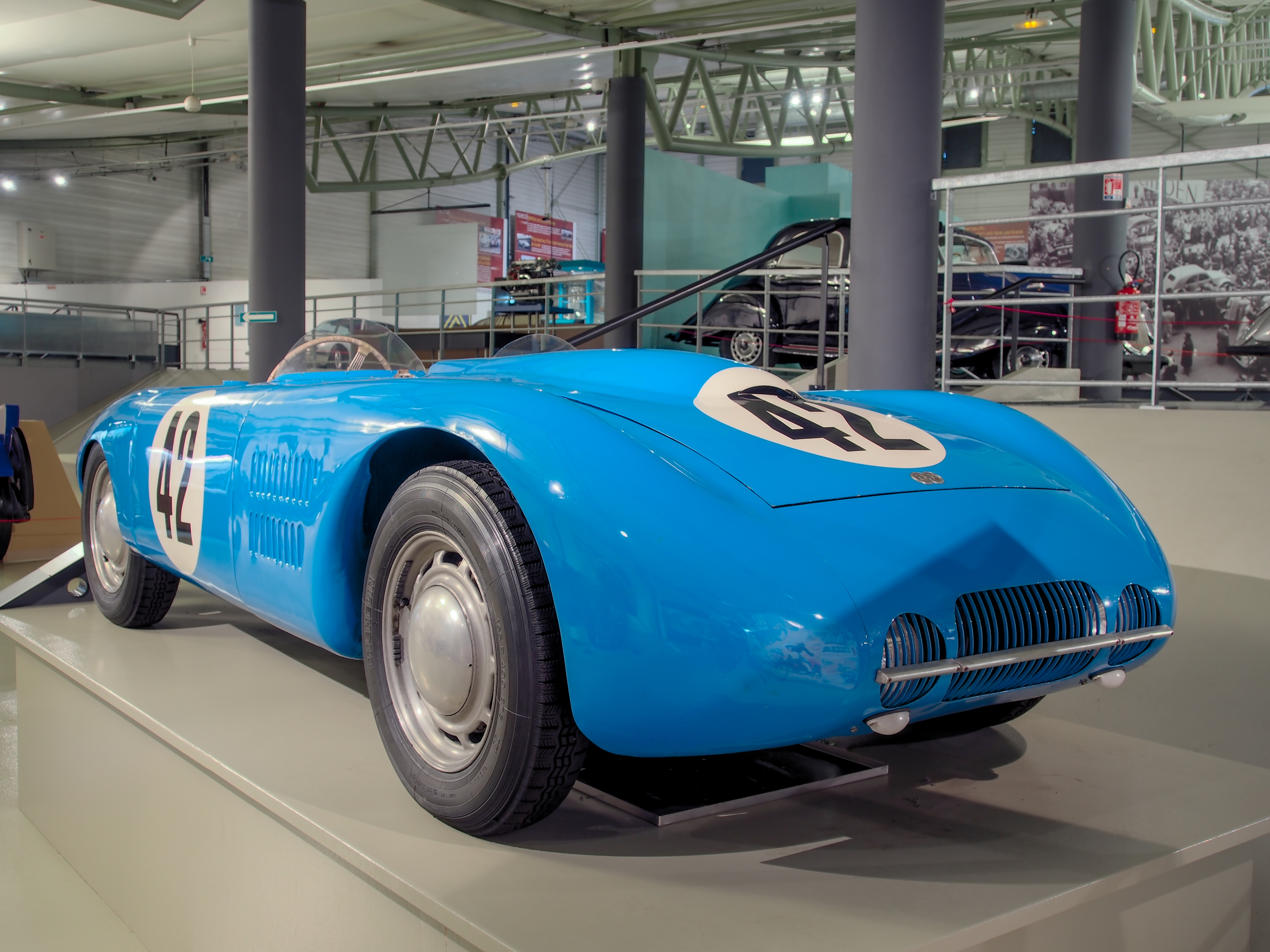
DB of Bonnet and Deutsch, which retired due to a seized camshaft

After all the hard work getting back to 5th overall, Flahout's engine finally gave out mid-morning. The little DB-5 had reached as high as sixth but then its camshaft seized at a similar time. Likewise, the Delettrez diesel came to a stop. It had performed steadily, if not quickly, but blocked fuel lines caused its demise when in 23rd place.

Except for Louveau's Delage, all the leading cars were now running under duress: aside from Chinetti's clutch, Gérard's Delage was streaming oil-smoke, the Fraser-Nash had lost its clutch and having fuel-feed issues and Maréchal's Aston Martin was losing its brakes. The last was the most serious and, ultimately, tragic: at 1pm the Aston Martin's brakes failed completely coming into the Maison Blanche curves. In a violent crash, the car rolled, the engine was torn away and the roof crushed. Pierre Maréchal was immediately taken to hospital in a critical condition but died the next day from spinal injuries.

=== Finish and post-race ===
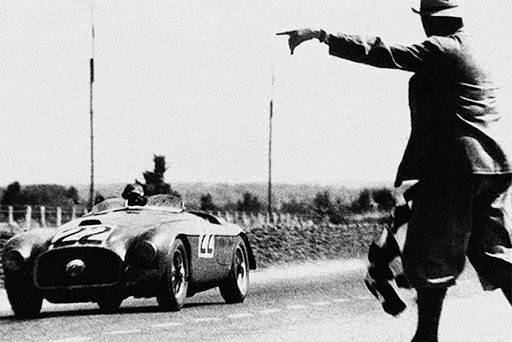
The winning Ferrari 166 MM crosses the finish line, with Chinetti driving

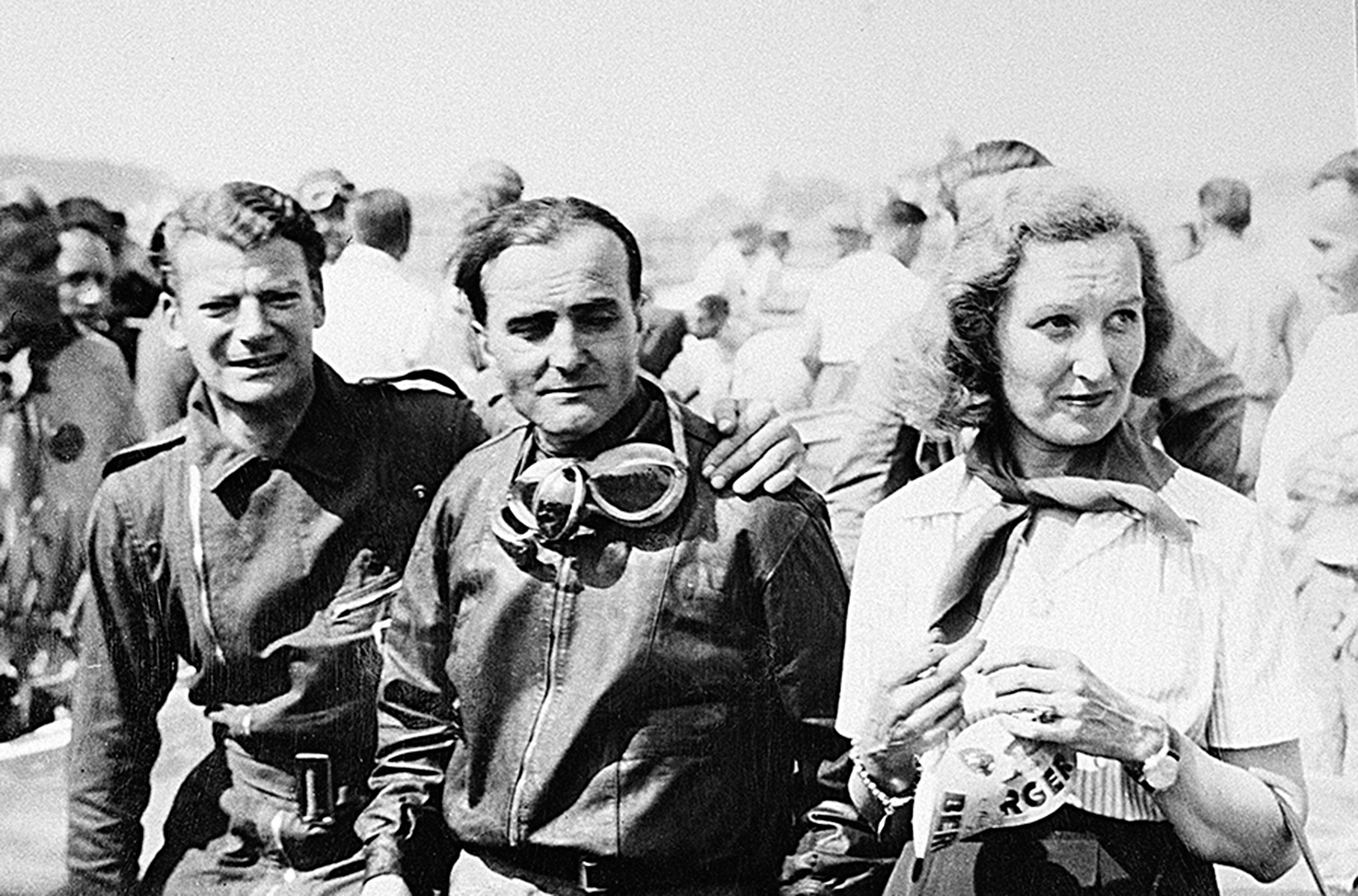
Race winners Mitchell-Thomson (left) and Chinetti (center), with Chinetti's wife, Marion (right)

Over the course of the race Louveau had chased hard, gaining back two laps on the slowing Ferrari. Up to the last lap he was drifting through the corners, thrilling a growing crowd, who began to envision a comeback victory for the French driver. But it was not to be and the veteran Chinetti carefully nursed his car home with just enough pace. At 4pm Charles Faroux, originator and director of the race since its inception in 1923, was again the man to wave the chequered flag – overseen by the new French President, Vincent Auriol.

Chinetti got home by only 15 km - just over a lap - from the charging Louveau (who matched Delage's best Le Mans result). The Frazer-Nash had moved up to third after midday and, although ten laps behind the leaders, kept it despite gearbox problems and virtually no clutch by the end.

The big #1 Talbot-Lago SS sedan had been running well all race and had comfortably moved into 4th place until the very last lap when it stopped on circuit with engine failure (or out of fuel!). After running strongly Louis Gérard lost time when the engine lost a cylinder, then he was one of the first on the scene and stopped to help poor Maréchal. His Delage inherited the Talbot's fourth place and finished trailing a plume of oil smoke.

Veterans Georges Grignard (who would later buy the stock of the bankrupt Talbot company) and Robert Brunet brought home the first of the Delahayes, in 5th place winning the S5000 class. In sixth came the Bentley of owner Jack Hay and racing journalist Tommy Wisdom, that had not missed a beat all race, apart from two punctures. Having had a night's sleep afterward, Hay then swapped the big fuel tank for the family luggage and they headed off to the Côte d’Azur on holiday.

After the demise of the DB, it was the HRG of Jack Fairman (in his first Le Mans) who inherited the 1500cc class lead despite being 10 laps adrift and he held that to the end of the race. Both Aero-Minor's finished (the only manufacturer to finish a complete team) with one of the cars finishing second in the Index of Performance. Otherwise, it was a rugged race in the weekend's heat – only 16 of the 49 starters being classified. The ‘’ternary’’ fuel was blamed for a number of engine problems affecting the cars during the race.

For the Italian-born Chinetti, who had emigrated to America after the war, this was his third Le Mans victory (the second man to do so after Woolf Barnato’s trio of victories for Bentley). He had driven for nearly 23 hours – no mean feat for the 47-year old – which was the reverse of his first win in 1932, when he had been ill and Raymond Sommer had to do most of the driving. Mitchell-Thompson, after finishing 4th in the 1939 race and victory here, won the Biennial Cup.

It was the first victory for a V12 engine, and until the Porsche victory in 2015 with its 2.0L hybrid-turbo, the Ferrari 1995cc engine was the smallest engine to win Le Mans outright. Such overachievement also meant a victory in the Index of Performance, giving a clean sweep to Ferrari of all the silverware in its very first Le Mans – not matched until McLaren’s comprehensive win at first attempt in 1995. After being repaired, Dreyfus’ Ferrari went on the following weekend to win the Spa 24-Hours race, driven by Chinetti and Simon.

== Official results ==
Results taken from Quentin Spurring's book, officially licensed by the ACO

Pos	Class	No	Team	Drivers	Chassis	Engine	Score
1	S 2.0	22	(United Kingdom) Peter Mitchell-Thomson, Lord Selsdon (private entrant)	(United States) Luigi Chinetti (United Kingdom) Peter Mitchell-Thomson, Lord Selsdon	Ferrari 166 MM	Ferrari 2.0L V12	235
2	S 3.0	15	(France) Henri Louveau (private entrant)	(France) Henri Louveau (Spain) Juan Jover	Delage D6S-3L	Delage 3.0L i6	234
3	S 2.0	26	(United Kingdom) Mrs. P. Trevelyan (private entrant)	(United Kingdom) Harold John Aldington (United Kingdom) Norman Culpan	Frazer Nash High Speed Le Mans Replica	Bristol 2.0L I6	224
4	S 3.0	14	(United Kingdom) W.S. Watney (private entrant)	(France) Louis Gérard (Spain) Francisco Godia-Sales	Delage D6S-3L	Delage 3.0L I6	212
5	S 5.0	11	(France) Pierre Meyrat (private entrant)	(France) Pierre Meyrat (France) Robert Brunet	Delahaye 135CS	Delahaye 4.0L I6	210
6	S 5.0	6	(United Kingdom) H.S.F. Hay (private entrant)	(United Kingdom) Jack "Zoltan" Hay (United Kingdom) Tommy Wisdom	Embiricos Bentley Paulin	Bentley 4.3L I6	210
7	S 2.0	27	(United Kingdom) Arthur Jones (private entrant)	(United Kingdom) Arthur Jones (United Kingdom) Nick Haines	Aston Martin DB2	Aston Martin 2.0L I4	207
8	S 1.5	35	(United Kingdom) Ecurie Lapin Blanc (United Kingdom) HRG Engineering	(United Kingdom) Eric Thompson (United Kingdom) Jack Fairman	HRG 1500 Lightweight Le Mans	Singer 1.5L I4	202
9	S 5.0	12	(France) René Bouchard (private entrant)	(France) René Bouchard (France) Pierre Larrue	Delahaye 135MS	Delahaye 3.6L I6	200
N/C*	S 5.0	9	(France) Henry Leblanc (private entrant)	(France) Henry Leblanc (France) Jean Brault	Delahaye 135CS	Delahaye 3.6L I6	194
10	S 2.0	29	(United Kingdom) Robert Lawrie (private entrant)	(United Kingdom) Robert Lawrie (United Kingdom) Richard W. Parker	Aston Martin 2-Litre Sports (DB1)	Aston Martin 2.0L I4	193
11	S 1.1	44	(France) Monopole-Poissy	(France) Jean de Montrémy (France) Eugène Dussous	Monopole Sport	Simca 1.1L I4	185
N/C*	S 3.0	20	(United Kingdom) Jack Bartlett (private entrant)	(United Kingdom) Jack Bartlett (United Kingdom) Nigel Mann	Healey Elliott	Riley 2.4L I4	180
12	S 1.1	47	(France) N.J. Mahé / R. Crovetto (private entrant)	(France) Norbert Jean Mahé (France) Roger Crovetto	Simca Huit	Gordini 1.1L I4	178
13	S 750	58	(Czechoslovakia) Let-Aviation	(Czechoslovakia) František Sutnar (Czechoslovakia) Otto Krattner	Aero Minor Sport 750	Aero 0.7L Flat-2 (2-Stroke)	177
14	S 1.5	41	(France) Auguste Lachaize (private entrant)	(France) Auguste Lachaize (France) Albert Debille	DB Tank	Citroën 1.5L I4	176
N/C*	S 1.1	52	(France) André Guillard (private entrant)	(France) André Guillard (France) Théodore Martin	Simca Huit	Gordini 1.1L I4	156
15	S 750	60	(France) Ecurie Verte	(France) Emmanuel Baboin (France) Pierre Gay	Simca Six	Simca 0.6L I4	156
16	S 750	59	(France) Jacques Poch (private entrant)	(Czechoslovakia) Ivan Hodač (France) Jacques Poch	Aero Minor Sport 750	Aero 0.7L Flat-2 (2-Stroke)	150

- Note *: Not Classified as car failed to achieve its allotted distance

== Did Not Finish ==
Pos	Class	No	Team	Drivers	Chassis	Engine	Laps	Reason
DNF	S 5.0	1	(France) André Chambas / Écurie Verte	(France) André Chambas (France) André Morel	Talbot-Lago Grand Sport Coupé	Talbot-Lago 4.5L I6	222	Engine (headgasket) (24hr)
DNF	S 3.0	18	(France) Auguste Veuillet (private entrant)	(France) Auguste Veuillet (France) Edmond Mouche	Delage D6-3L	Delage 3.0L I6	208	Engine / fire (23hr)
DNF	S 2.0	28	(United Kingdom) Mrs. R.P. Hichens (private entrant)	(France) Pierre Marechal (United Kingdom) Donald Mathieson	Aston Martin DB2	Aston Martin 2.0L i4	192	Accident (23hr)
DNF	S 5.0	4	(France) Ecurie Charles Pozzi	(France) André Simon (France) Pierre Flahaut	Delahaye 175S	Delahaye 4.5L I6	179	Engine (19hr)
DNF	S 1.5	42	(France) René Bonnet (France) Automobiles DB	(France) René Bonnet (France) Charles Deutsch	DB 5	Citroën 1.5L I4	175	Engine (19hr)
DSQ	S 1.5	43	(United Kingdom) G.E. Phillips (private entrant)	(United Kingdom) George Phillips (United Kingdom) R.M. Dryden	MG TC Special Body	MG 1.3L I4	134	Outside assistance (18hr)
DNF	S 5.0	8	(France) Louis Villeneuve (private entrant)	(France) Marius Chanal (France) Yves Giraud-Cabantous	Delahaye 135CS	Delahaye 3.6L I6	128	Engine / fire (18hr)
DNF	S 5.0	10	(United Kingdom) R.R.C. Walker Racing Team	(United Kingdom) Tony Rolt (United Kingdom) Guy Jason-Henry	Delahaye 135CS	Delahaye 3.6L I6	126	Engine (21hr)
DNF	S 5.0	5	(France) Etablissements Delettrez	(France) Jean Delettrez (France) Jacques Delettrez	Delettrez Diesel	Delettrez 4.4L I6 (Diesel)	123	Out of fuel (20hr)
DNF	S 1.1	45	(France) Monopole-Poissy	(France) Jean Hémard (France) Raymond Leinard	Monopole	Simca 1.1L I4	120	Engine (17hr)
DNF	S 1.1	48	(France) Just-Emile Vernet (private entrant)	(France) Just-Emile Vernet (France) Claude Batault	Simca Huit	Simca 1.1L I4	118	Accident (16hr)
DNF	S 1.1	56	(France) Jacques Savoye (private entrant)	(France) Jacques Savoye (France) Marcel Renault	Singer 9	Singer 1.0L I4	97	Transmission (14hr)
DNF	S 5.0	2	Écurie France; Talbot-Lago	(France) Paul Vallée (France) Guy Mairesse	Talbot-Lago Monoplace Décalée	Talbot-Lago 4.5L I6	95	Engine (10hr)
DNF	S 1.1	54	(France) Mme Vivianne Elder (private entrant)	(France) Vivianne Elder (France) René Camerano	Simca Huit	Simca 1.1L I4	95	Engine (13hr)
DNF	S 1.1	46	(France) Robert Redge (private entrant)	(France) Félix Lecerf (France) Robert Redge	Simca Dého	Simca 1.1L I4	89	Engine (13hr)
DNF	S 1.1	50	(France) Amédée Gordini (France) Automobiles Gordini	(France) Pierre Veyron (France) José Scaron	Simca-Gordini T8	Simca 1.1L I4	88	Transmission (10hr)
DNF	S 1.5	34	(United Kingdom) Ecurie Lapin Blanche (United Kingdom) HRG Engineering	(United Kingdom) Jack Scott-Douglas (United Kingdom) Neville Gee	HRG 1500 Lightweight Le Mans	Singer 1.5L I4	83	Engine (13hr)
DNF	S 3.0	16	(France) Marc Versini (private entrant)	(France) Marc Versini (France) Gaston Serraud	Delage D6-3L	Delage 3.0L I6	58	Engine (7hr)
DNF	S 2.0	23	(France) J.A. Plisson (private entrant)	(France) Jean Lucas (France) Pierre Louis-Dreyfus ("Ferret")	Ferrari 166 MM	Ferrari 2.0L V12	53	Accident (6hr)
DNF	S 5.0	3	(France) Ecurie Charles Pozzi	(France) Eugène Chaboud (France) Charles Pozzi	Delahaye 175S	Delahaye 4.5L I6	52	Electrics / fire (6hr)
DNF	S 2.0	30	(United Kingdom) Peter Monkhouse (private entrant)	(United Kingdom) Peter Monkhouse (United Kingdom) Ernest Stapleton	Aston Martin Speed Model	Aston Martin 2.0L I4	45	Cooling (7hr)
DNF	S 1.1	51	(France) Robert Tocheport (private entrant)	(France) Robert Tocheport (Switzerland) Roget Carron	Simca Huit	Simca 1.1L I4	45	Radiator (6hr)
DNF	S 1.5	36	(France) Just-Emile Vernet (private entrant)	(France) Georges Trouis (France) Roger Eckerlein	Riley RMA	Riley 1.5L I4	40	Electrics (11hr)
DNF	S 2.0	31	(United Kingdom) Dudley C. Folland (private entrant)	(United Kingdom) Anthony Heal (United Kingdom) Dudley Folland	Aston Martin Speed Model	Aston Martin 2.0L I4	26	Engine (4hr)
DNF	S 5.0	7	(France) Ecurie Rosier	(France) Louis Rosier (France) Jean-Louis Rosier	Talbot-Lago Spéciale	Talbot-Lago 4.1L I6	21	Fanbelt (3hr)
DNF	S 1.1	57	(France) Camille Hardy (private entrant)	(France) Camille Hardy (France) Maurice Roger	Renault 4CV	Renault 0.8L I4	21	Engine (7hr)
DNF	S 1.5	33	(United Kingdom) Ecurie Lapin Blanche (United Kingdom) HRG Engineering	(United Kingdom) Peter Clark (United Kingdom) Mortimer Morris-Goodall	HRG 1500 Lightweight Le Mans	Singer 1.5L I4	11	Water-hose (3hr)
DNF	S 3.0	19	(United Kingdom) Aston Martin Lagonda Ltd.	(United Kingdom) Leslie Johnson (United Kingdom) Charles Brackenbury	Aston Martin DB2	Lagonda 2.6L I6	6	Water pump (1hr)
DNF	S 2.0	32	(Belgium) Louis Eggen (private entrant)	(Belgium) Louis Eggen (Belgium) Egon Kraft de la Saulx	Alvis TA 14	Alvis 1.9L I4	6	Engine (1hr)
DNF	S 1.1	49	(France) Amédée Gordini (France) Automobiles Gordini	(France) Jean Trévoux (France) Marcel Lesurque	Simca-Gordini TMM	Simca 1.1L I4	5	Transmission (1hr)

== 15th Rudge-Whitworth Biennial Cup (1939/1949) ==
Pos	Class	No	Team	Drivers	Chassis	Score
1	S 2.0	22	(United Kingdom) Peter Mitchell-Thomson, Lord Selsdon	(United States) Luigi Chinetti (United Kingdom) Peter Mitchell-Thomson, Lord Selsdon	Ferrari 166 MM	1.272
2	S 2.0	26	(United Kingdom) Mrs. P. Trevelyan	(United Kingdom) Harold John Aldington (United Kingdom) Norman Culpan	Frazer Nash High Speed Le Mans Replica	1.216
3	S 2.0	27	(United Kingdom) Arthur Jones	(United Kingdom) Arthur Jones (United Kingdom) Nick Haines	Aston Martin DB2	1.123
4	S 3.0	14	(United Kingdom) W.S. Watney	(France) Louis Gérard (Spain) Francisco Godia-Sales	Delage D6S-3L	1.085

== Statistics ==
- Fastest Lap in practice – Louis Rosier, #7 Talbot-Lago T150C Spéciale – 5:02
- Fastest Lap – André Simon, #4 Delahaye 175S – 5:12.5
- Distance – 3178.299 km (1975.00 miles)
- Average Speed – 132.420 km/h
- Attendance – 83000. or 183000

== Trophy Winners ==
- 15th Rudge-Whitworth Biennial Cup – #22 Luigi Chinetti / Peter Mitchell-Thomson, Lord Selsdon
- Index of Performance – #22 Luigi Chinetti / Peter Mitchell-Thomson, Lord Selsdon
