= Malcolm Mitchell-Thomson, 3rd Baron Selsdon =

British peer (1937–2024)

The Right Honourable The Lord Selsdon

Member of the House of Lords
- Lord Temporal
- Hereditary peerage 30 July 1963 – 11 November 1999
- Preceded by: The 2nd Baron Selsdon
- Succeeded by: Seat abolished
- Elected Hereditary Peer; 11 November 1999 – 11 May 2021
- Election: 1999
- Preceded by: Seat established
- Succeeded by: The 4th Baron Altrincham

Personal details
- Born: 27 October 1937
- Died: 15 September 2024 (aged 86)
- Party: Conservative

Malcolm McEacharn Mitchell-Thomson, 3rd Baron Selsdon (27 October 1937 – 15 September 2024) was a British peer, banker and businessman. He sat in the House of Lords from 1963 to 2021, having been elected as one of the 90 hereditary peers who retained their seats after the passing of the House of Lords Act 1999.

== Background ==
The son of Patrick William Malcolm Mitchell-Thomson, 2nd Baron Selsdon (1913−1963), and his first wife, Phoebette Swithinbank (d. 1991), Selsdon was educated at Winchester College. He served in the Royal Navy from 1956 to 1958, reaching the rank of sub-lieutenant in the Royal Naval Reserve.

Selsdon was married twice: in 1965 to Patricia Anne Smith (d. 2018); and in 1995, after divorcing his first wife, to Gabrielle Williams. He had one son, Callum Malcolm McEacharn Mitchell-Thomson, 4th Baron Selsdon (b. 1969).

Selsdon died on 15 September 2024, at the age of 86.

== Parliamentary career ==
Having succeeded his father as Baron Selsdon at the age of 25, he took his seat in the House of Lords on 30 July 1963. He made his maiden speech on 9 December 1970 in a debate entitled Pollution and Protection of the Environment. His next speech was in a debate on the EEC: British entry negotiations on 19 January 1971. In his third speech he seconded the Address in Reply to Her Majesty's Most Gracious Speech by Lady Macleod of Borve (widow of Iain Macleod) on 2 November 1971, an honour given him after he caught the eye of fellow Wykehamist and EEC enthusiast Lord Jellicoe, Leader of the House of Lords.

Seldson was a delegate to the Council of Europe from 1972 to 1978. He chaired the Committee for Middle East Trade from 1979 to 1986 and was a member of the British Overseas Trade Board and the Eastern European Trade Council.

He was one of the 90 hereditary peers elected to remain in the House of Lords after the passing of the House of Lords Act 1999, sitting as a Conservative. His membership ended on 11 May 2021 due to non-attendance. At the time, in his 58th year of service, he was the second longest-serving member of the House of Lords after Lord Trefgarne.

== Business career ==
Selsdon worked for the UAM Group from 1959 to 1963, for the London Press Exchange Group from 1964 to 1972 and for Singer & Friedlander from 1972 to 1976. Between 1976 and 1990 he was the director of international banking and public finance adviser for the Midland Bank Group. In addition, he worked from 1978 to 1998 with Merloni Group, from 1994 to 1998 for Raab Karcher and after 1996 for the MJ Gleeson Group. Between 1992 and 1998 he was president of the British Exporters' Association.

== Other interests ==
Selsdon was a keen sportsman − a player of rackets, squash and real and lawn tennis, as well as a skier and sailor − and he chaired the Greater London and South East Regional Council for Sport and Recreation from 1977 to 1983. In 2001 he became president of the Anglo-Swiss Society, and in 2004 he was honorary treasurer and honorary secretary of the House of Lords Yacht Club.

Coat of arms of Malcolm Mitchell-Thomson, 3rd Baron Selsdon
Crest A dexter hand couped at the wrist Proper grasping a crosscrosslet fitchee in bend sinister Gules. Escutcheon Per pale Argent and Gules between three mascles a stag's head cabossed all counterchanged. Supporters Two seahorses Proper crined Sable finned Or. Motto Deus Providebit (God Will Provide)

== Sources ==
- "DodOnline". Archived from the original on 3 October 2006.

Peerage of the United Kingdom
Preceded by Peter Mitchell-Thomson	Baron Selsdon; 1963–2024; Member of the House of Lords (1963–1999)	Succeeded by Callum Mitchell-Thomson
Parliament of the United Kingdom
New office created by the House of Lords Act 1999	Elected hereditary peer to the House of Lords under the House of Lords Act 1999; 1999–2021	Succeeded by The Lord Altrincham
