= Polmood =

Village in Scottish Borders, Scotland

Coordinates: 55°32′N 3°24′W

Polmood is a small settlement in southern Scotland north-east of Tweedsmuir on the A701 in the Scottish Borders, in the valley of the River Tweed.

Polmood was for many centuries the centre of the Hunter family in the lowlands and the earliest record was a charter dated 1057 to Norman Hunter of Polmood. It was once a Peel tower, part of a chain of beacons running down the Tweed Valley. At the end of the nineteenth century the temporary Talla Railway was built close to Polmont to deliver building materials during the construction of the Talla Reservoir.

Polmood House was erected on 1638 on the site of the older tower by Robert Hunter (d.1689). This house was ruinous by 1864 but was rebuilt and modernised by Houston Mitchell who had acquired the house and grounds in 1847. A 17th century dovecot survives 50m east of the house.

The estate was acquired by Mitchell Mitchell-Thomson, an Edinburgh businessman and politician who took his baronetcy title from the Peeblesshire estate of Polmood which he had acquired before 1916.

Polmood is commemorated in "The Piper of Polmood" a piece based on old Scottish folk-tunes by Victor Babin.

== In fiction ==
A Norman Hunter of Polmood, described as the ninth of that name and chief forester of the King of Scotland, features as one of the main characters in The Bridal of Polmood, a tale by James Hogg, the Ettrick Shepherd.

== See also ==
- List of places in the Scottish Borders
- List of places in Scotland

Next Peel tower upwards	Tweed Valley	Next Peel tower downwards
Oliver Castle	Polmood	Kingledoors
