= Mitchell Mitchell-Thomson =

British merchant and local government official

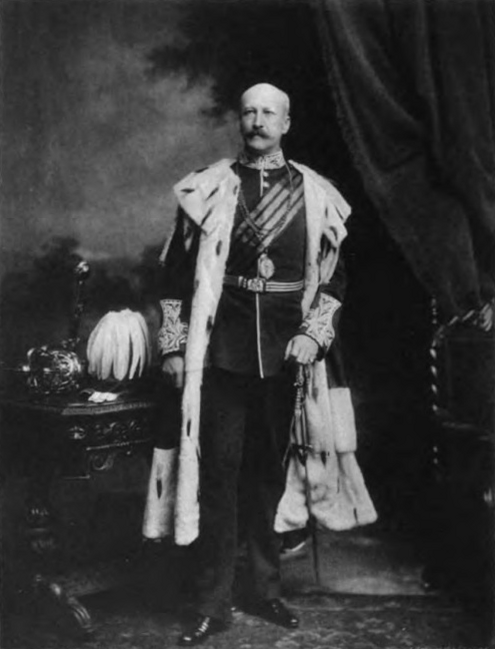
Sir M Mitchell Thomson, Lord Provost of Edinburgh

Sir Mitchell Mitchell-Thomson, 1st Baronet, FRSE, FSA(Scot) (5 December 1846 – 15 November 1918) was a British merchant and businessman who served as the Lord Provost of Edinburgh 1897 to 1900. He was also a Director of the Bank of Scotland.

== Life ==
He was born in Alloa, Clackmannanshire, Scotland, the youngest son of Andrew Thomson, a timber merchant, and his wife, Janet Mitchell. He was a maternal grandson of William Mitchell (1781–1854). He was educated at the Edinburgh Institution.

He followed in his father's trade as a timber merchant and monies (mainly from his mother's side) allowed him to purchase major tracts of land in Kincardineshire and Peeblesshire. His firm, Mitchell-Thomson & Co, operated from Granton Harbour north of Edinburgh.

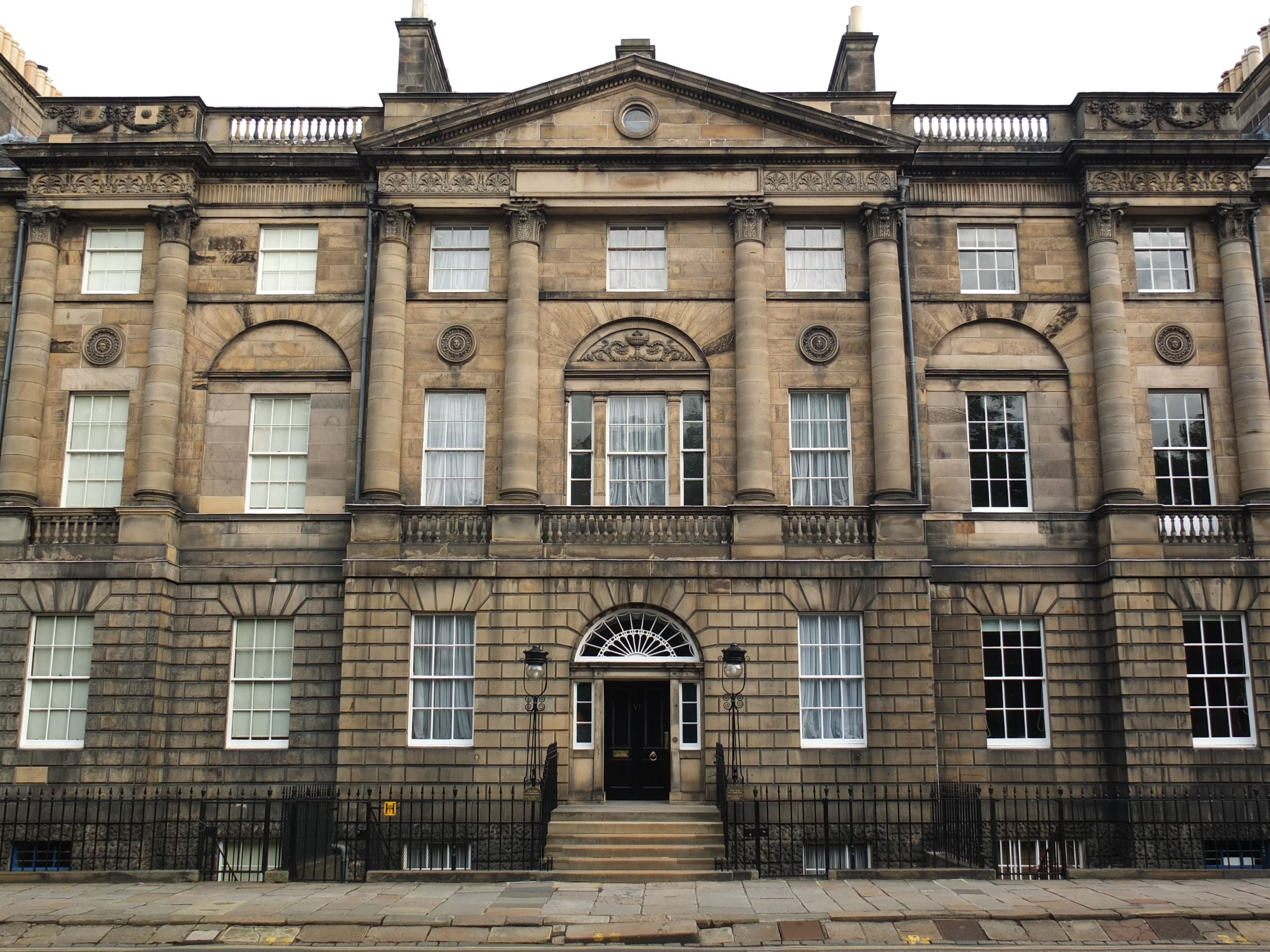
Mitchell-Thomson's stunning house at 6 Charlotte Square (Bute House)

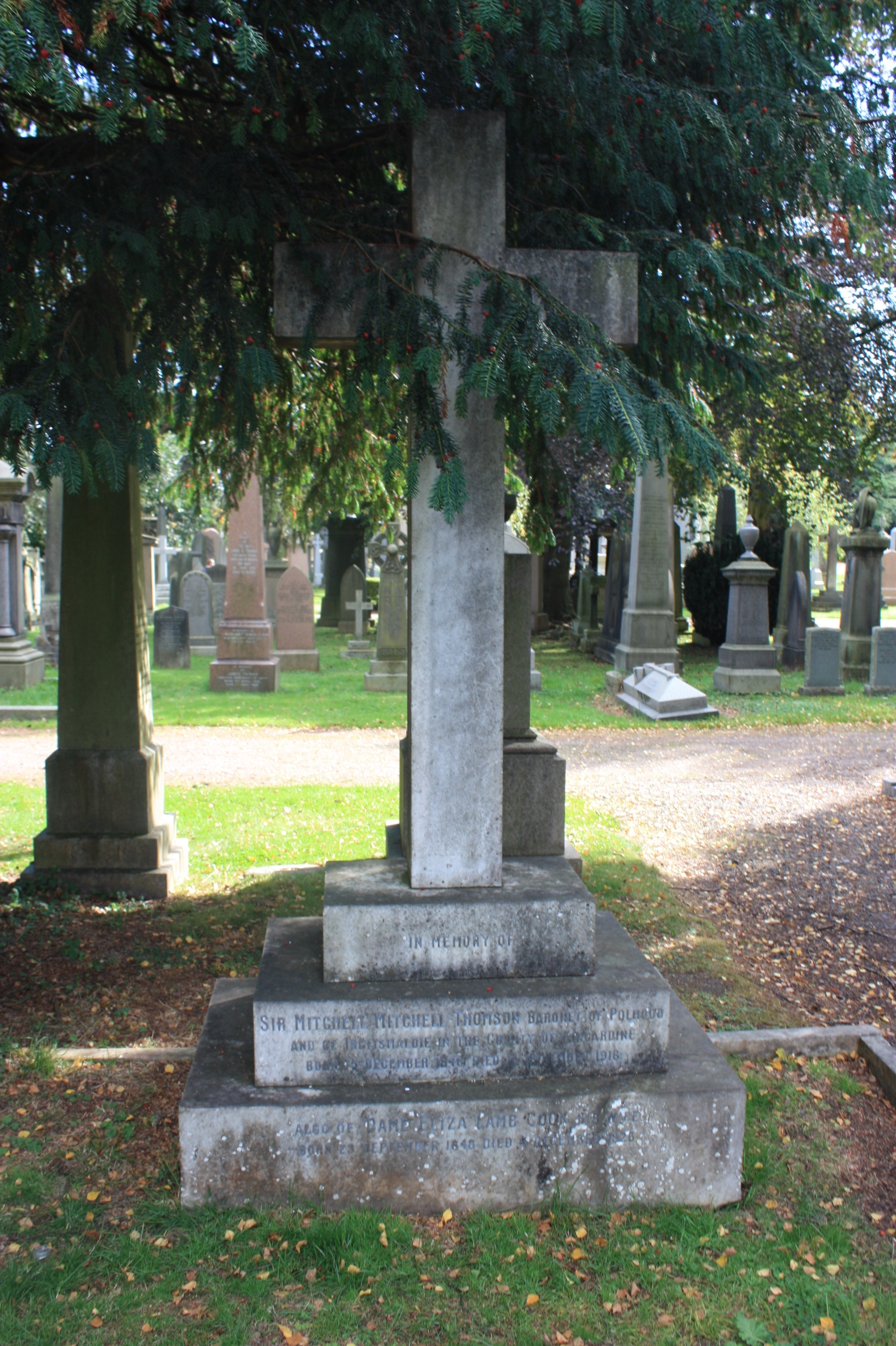
The grave of Mitchell Mitchell-Thomson, Dean Cemetery

He entered local politics in 1882 standing unsuccessfully for a council seat in Edinburgh. He finally was elected as a councillor in 1890. He served on the city’s Gas, Education and Water Commissions. He was the chairman on the Northhill Soup Kitchen committee in Edinburgh. He was a trustee and chairman for George Heriot’s School in Edinburgh. He was Provost of Edinburgh (1897–1900) and a JP for Peeblesshire. He was also a representative for Edinburgh to the General Council of the Church of Scotland. He served on the committee of the Edinburgh branch of the Navy league in the 1900s. He was not a free trader in that he was chairman of the Scottish Trade Protection Society (1890s) and later the Tariff Reform League (1900s).

He served as Lord Provost of Edinburgh from 1897 to 1900, succeeding Sir Andrew McDonald. As was customary for retiring Lord Provost's, he was created a baronet by Queen Victoria in 1900. During this period (1899) he was also elected a Fellow of the Royal Society of Edinburgh. His proposers were Sir John Murray, Alexander Crum Brown, Robert Flint and Alexander Buchan. During this period he also served as Honorary President of George Heriots Former Pupils Golf Club.

He started out a partner in the family timber business and later held directorships at various times in a range of Scottish-based companies (the Bank of Scotland, the Scottish Widow’s Fund Life Assurance Society, the British Investment Trust Company Arizona Trusts and Mortgage Company, the Scottish Reversionary Company Ltd.; the Caledonian Railway and the London Advisory Committee of the Canada Steamship Line Limited (1917). By 1916 he had acquired over 1,900 acres (7.7 km^{2}) of land including an estate in Peeblesshire called Polmood which he sold in 1917. He also owned land in Kincardineshire.

In later life he was living at 6 Charlotte Square, a huge and prestigious townhouse in the centre of Edinburgh designed by Robert Adam. His "country estate" was Polmood House in Tweedsmuir.

He died at home in Edinburgh on 15 November 1918. He is buried facing the north path of Dean Cemetery in Edinburgh, at the west end of the section closest to the main entrance.

== Family ==
He was married twice: firstly to Eliza Flowerdew Lowson in 1876 by whom he had one son William Mitchell-Thomson, 1st Baron Selsdon; and secondly, to Eliza Lamb Cook in 1880 by whom he had two daughters. At the time of his first marriage, he lived with his family at 7 Carlton Terrace on Calton Hill.

== Awards and honours ==
He was a Member of the Royal Company of Archers. He was elected to the Royal Society of Edinburgh in 1899. His proposers were Sir John Murray, Alexander Crum Brown, Robert Flint and Alexander Buchan.

For political and other services he was created Baronet of Polmood in the County of Peebles in 1900. He was a Knight of Grace of the Order of St. John of Jerusalem. He changed his surname to Mitchell-Thomson on acquiring the title.

Baronetage of the United Kingdom
| New creation | Baronet (of Polmood); 1900–1918 | Succeeded by William Mitchell-Thomson |
