= List of UK Parliament constituencies in Northern Ireland =

The Northern Ireland constituencies to the House of Commons of the UK Parliament, coloured in the party colour of the winning MP at the 2024 United Kingdom general election in Northern Ireland.

Northern Ireland is divided into 18 UK Parliament constituencies: 4 borough constituencies in Belfast and 14 county constituencies elsewhere. The Northern Ireland Act 1998 provides that the constituencies for the Northern Ireland Assembly are the same as the constituencies that are used for the United Kingdom Parliament. Parliamentary constituencies are not used for local government, which is instead carried out by 11 district councils.

== Constituencies ==
Each constituency returns one Member of Parliament (MP) to the House of Commons at Westminster.

- Belfast East
- Belfast North
- Belfast South and Mid Down
- Belfast West
- East Antrim
- East Londonderry
- Fermanagh and South Tyrone
- Foyle
- Lagan Valley
- Mid Ulster
- Newry and Armagh
- North Antrim
- North Down
- South Antrim
- South Down
- Strangford
- Upper Bann
- West Tyrone

== 2024 general election ==
Democratic Unionist Sinn Féin Social Democratic and Labour Ulster Unionist Alliance Party Traditional Unionist Voice

Name (Note: BC denotes borough constituency, CC denotes county constituency.)	Electorate	Majority (Note: The majority is the number of votes the winning candidate receives more than their nearest rival.)	MP	Unionist %	Nationalist % (Note: Includes People Before Profit, which is classified as "other" in the Northern Ireland Assembly.)	Other %	Map
Belfast East BC	72,917	2,676	Gavin Robinson	55.4	1.4	43.2	A very small constituency, located in the east of the country.
Belfast North BC	74,240	5,612	John Finucane	36.9	49.5	13.6	A very small constituency, located in the east of the country
Belfast South & Mid Down BC	74,749	12,506	Claire Hanna	27.0	49.1	23.9	A very small constituency, located in the East of the country.
Belfast West BC	75,346	15,961	Paul Maskey	17.1	78.8	4.2	A very small constituency, located in the East of the country.
East Antrim CC	73,302	1,306	Sammy Wilson	63.2	9.7	27.0	A medium-sized constituency, located in the East of the country.
East Londonderry CC	75,707	179	Gregory Campbell	47.3	42.6	10.1	A fairly large constituency, located in the north of the country.
Fermanagh & South Tyrone CC	77,828	4,571	Pat Cullen	39.7	54.3	5.9	A very large constituency, comprising the southwest area of the country.
Foyle CC	73,496	4,166	Colum Eastwood	13.9	78.8	7.3	A medium-sized constituency found in the south east of the county.
Lagan Valley CC	82,201	2,959	Sorcha Eastwood	59.1	2.1	38.8	A medium constituency located inland, in the southeast of the country.
Mid Ulster CC	74,000	14,923	Cathal Mallaghan	31.8	63.5	4.8	A medium constituency, located slightly to the north and west of the centre of the country.
Newry & Armagh CC	78,244	15,493	Dáire Hughes	28.8	65.2	5.9	A medium constituency in the south of the country.
North Antrim CC	74,697	450	Jim Allister	65.0	23.8	11.2	A large constituency in the north of the county.
North Down CC	73,885	7,305	Alex Easton	63.9 (Note: Includes Easton, who was supported by the DUP and TUV.)	1.5	34.6	A medium-sized constituency found in the south east of the county.
South Antrim CC	77,058	7,512	Robin Swann	64.8	23.3	12.0	A medium constituency located in the east of the county.
South Down CC	76,248	9,280	Chris Hazzard	23.6	68.3	8.0	A medium constituency located in the south-east of the county.
Strangford CC	74,525	5,131	Jim Shannon	58.6	11.8	29.7	A medium constituency located in the south-east of the county.
Upper Bann CC	81,249	7,406	Carla Lockhart	53.4	33.3	13.3	A medium constituency in the centre of the county.
West Tyrone CC	74,269	15,917	Órfhlaith Begley	27.6	67.1	5.2	A medium-sized constituency found in the west of the county.

== Historical representation by party ==
Where a cell is marked → (with a different colour of frame to the preceding cell) it indicates that the previous MP continued to sit under a new party affiliation. Changes are dated in the header row: either a general election (four-figure year, bold, link) or by-election or change in affiliation (two-figure year, italic, link or details appear on hover).

=== 1801 to 1832 (22 MPs) ===
==== Antrim ====
Tory Whig

Constituency	1801	1802	1806	07	1807	1812	14	16	1818	19	1820	22	1826	1830	1831
Antrim	Staples	O'Neill													
Antrim	MacNaghten					F. Seymour-Conway			H. H. Seymour			R. Seymour-Conway	MacNaghten	G. Chichester	→
Belfast	J. May						S. May	Michel	A. Chichester		G. Chichester			A. Chichester	
Carrickfergus	Dalway	S. Chichester		Craig		A. Chichester			G. Chichester		A. Chichester			Hill	
Lisburn	Hatton	F. Seymour-Conway				Moore			Foster	H. B. Seymour			Meynell		

==== Londonderry ====
Tory Whig

Constituency	1801	01	1802	1806	07	1807	09	1812	14	14	15	1818	1820	23	1826	1830	1831	31
Coleraine	W. Jones			*	W. Jones		J. Beresford	G. Beresford	J. Beresford					Brydges				Copeland
Londonderry City	Alexander		Hill*													Ferguson		
County Londonderry	C. Stewart									A. Stewart		A. R. Stewart				T. Jones		
County Londonderry	vacant	Hill	G. Beresford					Ponsonby			Dawson					Bateson		

* Sir George Hill, 2nd Baronet, was elected to sit as MP for both Coleraine and Londonderry City in the 1806 general election and chose to continue to sit for Londonderry City, hence the 1807 by-election, in which Walter Jones was restored to his seat.

==== Tyrone ====
Tory Whig Independent

Constituency	1801	01	02	1802	03	1806	07	1807	09	1812	1818	1820	25	1826	1830	1831
Dungannon	J. Knox	C. Hamilton		*	C. Hamilton	*	J. Hamilton	Cl. Hamilton	Scott	Holford	T. Knox jnr				J. J. Knox	
Tyrone	Lowry-Corry		John Stewart			T. Knox snr				John Stewart			H. Lowry-Corry			
Tyrone	James Stewart									T. Knox jnr	W. Stewart				H. Stewart	

* At both the 1802 and 1806 elections, George Knox was returned for both Dungannon and Dublin University and chose to sit for the university seat.

==== Armagh ====
Tory Whig

Constituency	1801	1802	1806	1807	1812	15	16	1818	19	1820	1826	1830	1831	31
Armagh	Duigenan						Webber	Foster		Stuart	Goulburn		Chetwynd-Talbot	Brydges
County Armagh	Acheson snr			Richardson						Caulfeild		Acheson jnr		
County Armagh	Cope	Caulfeild		W Brownlow		Caulfeild		C Brownlow*						
Newry	Moore	Corry	F Needham						FJ Needham		Knox			

* Charles Brownlow was initially elected as a Tory but at some point changed his affiliation to sit with the Whigs.

==== Down ====
Tory Whig

Constituency	1801	01	1802	05	1806	1807	12	1812	15	17	1818	1820	21	1826	1830	1831
Down	R Stewart			Meade						Hill						
Down	Savage					Ward	R Stewart						Forde	F Stewart		
Downpatrick	C Rowley	SC Rowley	Hawthorne		Ruthven*	Croker		Hawthorne	Annesley			Maxwell			Ruthven	

* The Parliaments of England by Henry Stooks Smith suggests that after the 1806 election there was a petition, which led to Edward Southwell Ruthven (Whig) being unseated and John Wilson Croker (Tory) being declared duly elected. Parliamentary Election Results in Ireland, 1801–1922, edited by BM Walker, does not make any reference to such a petition.

==== Fermanagh ====
Tory

Constituency	1801	1802	02	03	06	06	1806	07	1807	1812	1818	1820	23	1826	28	1830	1831
Enniskillen	Hamilton	Beresford	Burroughs		King	Fremantle	Sneyd	Bennet	Pochin	Magenis					AH Cole		
Fermanagh	Archdall snr	Archdall jnr															
Fermanagh	JW Cole			GL Cole									Lowry-Corry				WW Cole

=== 1832 to 1885 (29 MPs) ===
==== Antrim ====
Conservative Whig Peelite Liberal

Constituency	1832	1835	35	1837	38	41	1841	45	45	1847	52	1852	52	53	1857
Antrim	J. O'Neill					Alexander						E. Pakenham			
Antrim	G. Chichester			Irving					H. B. Seymour	E. C. Macnaghten		Macartney			
Belfast	A. Chichester	McCance	Dunbar	Gibson	J. Tennent					R. Tennent		Davison			
Belfast	J. Tennent	→		G. Chichester	Dunbar		Johnson	A. Chichester		→		Cairns			
Carrickfergus	C. Dobbs	Kirk								Stapleton-Cotton					W. Dobbs
Lisburn	Meynell									H. B. Seymour	J. Tennent		Smyth	Richardson	

Constituency	1859	60	63	63	1865	66	1868	69	73	1874	78	1880	85
Antrim	T. Pakenham				G. H. Seymour			H. Seymour		Chaine			Sinclair
Antrim	Upton		E. O'Neill									E. MacNaghten	
Belfast	Davison	Getty					Johnston				Ewart		
Belfast	Cairns					Lanyon	McClure			Corry			
Carrickfergus	Torrens						Dalway					Greer	
Lisburn	Richardson		Barbour	Verner					Wallace				

==== Londonderry ====
Conservative Whig Liberal

Constituency	1832	33	1835	1837	1841	42	43	44	1847	52	1852	1857	57
Coleraine	Beresford*	Copeland		Litton			Boyd			Naas		Boyd	
Londonderry City	Ferguson												
County Londonderry	Jones												Greer
County Londonderry	R. Bateson					R. Bateson jnr		T. Bateson				Clark	

Constituency	1859	60	62	1865	1868	72	1874	78	1880	81	84
Coleraine	Boyd		Bruce				Taylor		Bruce		
Londonderry City	Ferguson	McCormick		Hamilton	Dowse	Lewis					
County Londonderry	Dawson						Smyth	McClure			
County Londonderry	Heygate						Law			Porter	Walker

*unseated on petition

==== Tyrone ====
Conservative Peelite Liberal

Constituency	1832	1835	1837	38	39	1841	1847	51	1852	1857	1859	1865	1868	73	1874	1880	80	81
Dungannon	J. Knox		T. Knox	T. Knox jnr				W. Knox							T. Dickson		J. Dickson	
Tyrone	H. T. Lowry Corry						→		→					H. W. Lowry Corry		Litton		T. Dickson
Tyrone	Stewart	Hamilton	Alexander		Hamilton		→		→						Ellison-Macartney			

==== Armagh ====
Conservative Whig Peelite Liberal

Constituency	1832	1835	1837	40	1841	1847	51	1852	55	1857	1859	64	1865	67	1868	71	73	1874	75	1880
Armagh	Dobbin		Curry	Rawdon				Moore	Bond	Miller	Bond		Miller	Vance					Beresford	
County Armagh	Acheson					Caulfeild				Close		Stronge						Close		
County Armagh	Verner														W. Verner jnr		E. Verner			Richardson
Newry	Hill	Brady	Ellis		F. J. Needham	→	Hallewell	Kirk			Quinn		Innes		Kirk	F. C. Needham		Whitworth		Thomson

==== Down ====
Conservative Whig Peelite Liberal

Constituency	1832	1835	36	1837	1841	45	1847	51	1852	1857	1859	1865	67	1868	1874	78	1880	84
Down	A. M. Hill		A. W. B. Hill			Hill-Trevor											A. W. Hill	
Down	Stewart								D. S. Ker	Forde					Crawford	Vane-Tempest-Stewart		R. W. Ker
Downpatrick	Maxwell	D. Ker			D. S. Ker		R. Ker	Hardinge		R. Ker	D. S. Ker		Keown		Mulholland			

==== Fermanagh ====
Conservative

Constituency	1832	34	1835	1837	40	1841	44	1847	51	1852	54	1857	59	1859	1865	1868	1874	1880
Enniskillen	A. Cole						H. Cole		Whiteside				J. Cole			Crichton		L. Cole
Fermanagh	Archdall	M. Archdale															W. Archdale	
Fermanagh	W. Cole				Brooke						H. Cole							Crichton

=== 1885 to 1918 (25 MPs) ===
==== Antrim ====
Conservative Party Irish Unionist Russellite Unionist Independent Unionist

Constituency	1885	1886	87	1892	1895	99	1900	03	1906	Jan 1910	Dec 1910	13	15
East Antrim	J. McCalmont	→										R. McCalmont	
Mid Antrim	R. O'Neill	→								A. O'Neill			H. O'Neill
North Antrim	Macnaghten	→	Lewis	Connor	H. McCalmont	Moore			Glendinning	Kerr-Smiley			
South Antrim	Ellison-Macartney	→						Craig					

==== Armagh ====
Conservative Party Irish Unionist Irish Parliamentary Party (1885-90, 1900-22) / Irish National League (1890-1900) Irish National Federation Healyite Nationalist Nationalist Party

Constituency	1885	86	1886	91	1892	1895	00	1900	1906	06	09	Jan 1910	Dec 1910	17	18
Mid Armagh	McKane	Corry	→	Barton			Lonsdale								Lonsdale
North Armagh	Saunderson		→							Moore				Allen	
South Armagh	Blane				McHugh			J. Campbell	McKillop		O'Neill				Donnelly

==== Belfast ====
Conservative Party Irish Unionist Independent Unionist Liberal Unionist Irish Parliamentary Party (1885-90, 1900-22) / Irish National League (1890-1900) Irish National Federation Nationalist Party Labour Unionist

Constituency	1885	1886	89	90	92	1892	1895	96	1900	02	05	1906	07	Jan 1910	Dec 1910	14	Apr 17	Jul 17
Belfast East	de Cobain	→			Wolff										McMordie	Sharman-Crawford		
Belfast North	Ewart		Harland		→			Haslett			Dixon		Clark	Thompson				
Belfast South	Johnston	→			→					Sloan				Chambers				Lindsay
Belfast West	Haslett	Sexton		→		Arnold-Forster						Devlin						

==== Down ====
Conservative Party Irish Unionist Russellite Unionist Irish Parliamentary Party (1885-90, 1900-22) / Irish National League (1890-1900) Irish National Federation Nationalist Party

Constituency	1885	1886	90	1892	1895	98	1900	02	05	1906	07	08	Jan 1910	10	Dec 1910
East Down	Ker	→	Rentoul					Wood		Craig					
North Down	Waring	→				Blakiston-Houston	Corbett							Mitchell-Thomson	
South Down	Small	McCartan		→			→	McVeagh							
West Down	A. W. Hill	→				A. Hill			Liddell		A. W. Hill	MacCaw			
Newry	J. H. McCarthy			Carvill			→			Mooney					

==== Fermanagh ====
Irish Unionist Russellite Unionist Irish Parliamentary Party (1885-90, 1900-22) / Irish National League (1890-1900) Irish National Federation

Constituency	1885	1886	1892	1895	98	1900	03	1906	Jan 1910	Dec 1910	16
North Fermanagh	Redmond		Dane		Archdale		Mitchell	Fetherstonhaugh			Archdale
South Fermanagh	H. Campbell		McGilligan	Jordan		→				Crumley	

==== Londonderry ====
Conservative Party Irish Unionist Liberal Unionist Liberal Party Irish Parliamentary Party (1885-90, 1900-22) / Irish National League (1890-1900) Irish National Federation

Constituency	1885	1886	91	1892	1895	99	1900	1906	Jan 1910	Dec 1910	12	13	14	16
Londonderry City	Lewis	J. McCarthy		Ross	Knox	Moore	Hamilton					Hogg	Dougherty	
North Londonderry	Mulholland		→		Atkinson			Barrie						
South Londonderry	Healy	Lea					Gordon				→			Henry

==== Tyrone ====
Conservative Party Irish Unionist Russellite Unionist Liberal Unionist Liberal Party Irish Parliamentary Party (1885-90, 1900-22) / Irish National League (1890-1900) Irish National Federation Nationalist Party

Constituency	1885	1886	90	91	1892	1895	1900	02	1906	06	07	Jan 1910	Dec 1910	11	16	18
East Tyrone	Reynolds		→			Doogan	→			Kettle			Redmond			Harbison
Mid Tyrone	Kenny			→		Murnaghan	→					Brunskill	McGhee			
North Tyrone	E. Hamilton				F. Hamilton	Hemphill			Dodd		Barry			Russell		
South Tyrone	O'Brien	Russell						→			→	Horner			Coote	

=== 1918 to 1922 (30 MPs) ===
Irish Unionist Independent Unionist Labour Unionist Sinn Féin

Constituency	1918	19	19	21	21	21	22	22	22	22
East Antrim	R McCalmont		Hanna							
Mid Antrim	H O'Neill									
North Antrim	Kerr-Smiley									
South Antrim	Craig									
Mid Armagh	Lonsdale			Armstrong						
North Armagh	Allen									
South Armagh	Donnelly									
Belfast Pottinger	Dixon									
Belfast Duncairn	Carson			McConnell						
Belfast Cromac	Lindsay									
Belfast Falls	Devlin									
Belfast Ormeau	Moles									
Belfast Shankill	McGuffin									
Belfast St Anne's	Burn									
Belfast Victoria	Donald									
Belfast Woodvale	Lynn									
Queen's University	Whitla									
Constituency	1918	19	19	21	21	21	22	22	22	22
East Down	Reid									
North Down	Brown							H Wilson		Simms
South Down	McVeagh									
West Down	D Wilson				Wallace			Hayes		
Mid Down	Craig					Sharman-Crawford				
North Fermanagh	Archdale									
South Fermanagh	O'Μahony									
Londonderry City	MacNeill									
North Londonderry	Anderson	Barrie							Macnaghten	
South Londonderry	Henry					Chichester	Pain			
Tyrone North-East	Harbison									
Tyrone North-West	Griffith									
South Tyrone	Coote									
Constituency	1918	19	19	21	21	21	22	22	22	22

=== 1922 to 1950 (13 MPs) ===
Ulster Unionist Ulster Progressive Unionist Independent Unionist New Party Northern Ireland Labour Independent Labour Federation of Labour Irish Labour Nationalist Party

Constituency	1922	1923	1924	29	1929	31	1931	34	1935	38	39	40	43	43	1945	46	48	49
Antrim (Two members)	Craig				McConnell								Campbell		Haughton			
Antrim (Two members)	O'Neill																	
Armagh	Allen																Harden	
Belfast East	Dixon											Harland			Cole			
Belfast North	McConnell				Somerset										Neill			
Belfast South	Moles				Stewart					→					Gage			
Belfast West	Lynn				Allen	→	Browne						Beattie	→		→		→
Down (Two members)	Reid										Little				→	Mullan		
Down (Two members)	Simms						Vane-Tempest-Stewart								Smiles			
Fermanagh and Tyrone (Two members)	Harbison		Pringle		Harbison	Healy			Cunningham									
Fermanagh and Tyrone (Two members)	Healy		Falls		Devlin			Stewart	Mulvey									
Londonderry	Macnaghten			Ross														
Queen's University of Belfast	Whitla	Sinclair										Savory						

=== 1950 to 1983 (12 MPs) ===
Periodic boundary reviews commenced in 1947. The elections at which these were implemented are tagged with diamond suit characters, ♦.

The 1st Periodic Review boundary map can be viewed on the ARK elections website. Changes in the 2nd review were relatively minor.

Unionist parties	Ulster Unionist Protestant Unionist (pre-1971) / Democratic Unionist (post-1971) Vanguard Unionist / United Ulster Unionist (Mid Ulster, 1975-83) Conservative Party Independent Unionist Ulster Popular Unionist
Nationalist parties	Independent Republican Unity Nationalist Party Anti H-Block (pre-1982) / Sinn Féin (post-1982) Republican Labour Social Democratic and Labour
Other	Alliance Independent Independent Socialist Irish Labour

Constituency	1950 ♦	51	1951	52	53	54	1955	57	59	1959	63	1964	1966	69	1970	70	71	72	73	Feb 1974 ♦	Oct 1974	75	77	78	1979	80	81	81	82
Antrim N	H. O'Neill				P. O'Neill					Clark					Paisley		→												
Antrim S	Savory						Cunningham								Molyneaux														
Armagh	Harden					Armstrong				Maginnis										McCusker									
Belfast E	McKibbin								McMaster											Craig				→	Robinson				
Belfast N	Hyde									Mills								→	→	Carson					McQuade				
Belfast S	Gage			Campbell							Pounder									Bradford			→					Smyth	
Belfast W	Teevan^{3}		Beattie				McLaughlin					Kilfedder	Fitt			→										→			
Down N	Smiles				Ford		Currie								Kilfedder								→			→			
Down S	Orr																				Powell								
Ferm. & S Tyr.	Healy						Grosvenor^{1}					Hamilton			McManus					West	Maguire						Sands	Carron	→
Londonderry	Ross	Wellwood					Chichester-Clark													Ross									
Mid Ulster	Mulvey		O'Neill				Forrest^{2}	→						Devlin		→				Dunlop		→							

Notes:

1. The constituency was won by Philip Clarke of Sinn Féin, but he was unseated on petition on the basis that his criminal conviction (for Irish Republican Army activity) made him ineligible. Instead, the seat was awarded to the Ulster Unionist Party (UUP) candidate.
2. The seat was originally won by Tom Mitchell of Sinn Féin, but Mitchell was subsequently unseated upon petition, on the grounds that his terrorist convictions made him ineligible to sit in Parliament. The seat was awarded to Charles Beattie of the UUP. However, Beattie in turn was also found ineligible to sit due to holding an office of profit under the crown, triggering a further by-election.
3. Original winner of the 1950 election in that seat, J. G. MacManaway (UUP), disqualified due to being a clergyman. Teevan won the subsequent by-election

=== 1983 to present (17, then 18 MPs) ===
3rd and 4th Review boundary maps can be viewed on the ARK elections website: 1983, 1997.

Alliance Party Democratic Unionist Independent Sinn Féin Social Democratic and Labour Traditional Unionist Voice UK Unionist Party Ulster Popular Unionist Ulster Unionist

Constituency	1983 ♦	86	1987	90	1992	95	1997 ♦	00	2001	04	2005	10	2010 ♦	11	13	2015	2017	18	2019	24	2024 ♦
Belfast East	P Robinson												Long			G Robinson					
Belfast North	Walker								Dodds										Finucane		
Belfast South	Smyth^{1}										McDonnell						Pengelly		Hanna		
Belfast South and Mid Down																					Hanna
Belfast West	Adams				Hendron		Adams							Maskey							
East Antrim	Beggs										Wilson										
East Londonderry	Ross								Campbell												
Fermanagh & South Tyrone	Maginnis								Gildernew							Elliott	Gildernew				Cullen
Foyle	Hume										Durkan						McCallion		C Eastwood		
Lagan Valley	Molyneaux						Donaldson			→										→	S Eastwood
Mid Ulster	McCrea						McGuinness								Molloy						Mallaghan
Newry & Armagh	Nicholson	Mallon									Murphy					Brady					Hughes
North Antrim	Paisley												Paisley Jr^{1}								Allister
North Down	Kilfedder					McCartney			Hermon			→							Farry		Easton
South Antrim	Forsythe							McCrea	Burnside		McCrea					Kinahan	Girvan				Swann
South Down	Powell		McGrady										Ritchie				Hazzard				
Strangford	Taylor								I Robinson				Shannon								
Upper Bann	McCusker			Trimble							Simpson								Lockhart		
West Tyrone							Thompson		Doherty								McElduff	Begley			

^{1}Paisley Jr was suspended from the DUP between July and November 2018.

== Seats by political alignment (1983–present) ==
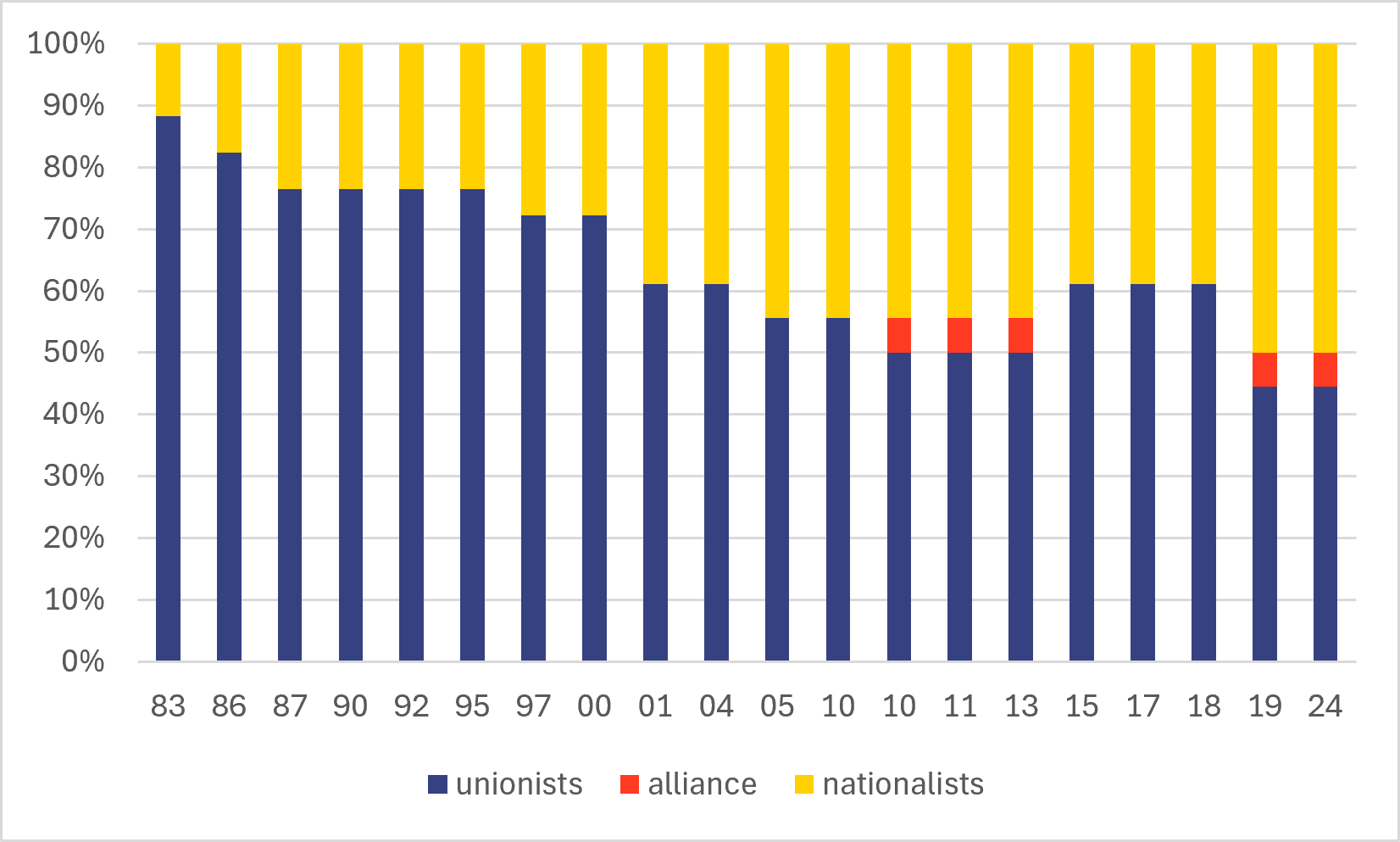

== Boundary changes ==
=== 2025–present ===
Constituencies since 2025

Following the abandonment of the Sixth Periodic Review (the 2018 review), the Boundary Commission for Northern Ireland formally launched the 2023 Review on 5 January 2021. In accordance with the provisions of the Parliamentary Constituencies Act 2020, the number of constituencies allocated to Northern Ireland was unchanged, at 18. Initial proposals were published on 20 October 2021 and, following two periods of public consultation, revised proposals were published on 17 November 2022. Final recommendations were published on 28 June 2023.

Under the recommendations, the following constituencies for Northern Ireland came into effect at the 2024 general election:

Constituency	Type	Electorate	Previous electorate
Belfast East	BC	70,076	66,273
Belfast North	BC	71,372	72,332
Belfast South and Mid Down	BC	71,978	70,134 (former Belfast South constituency)
Belfast West	BC	71,921	65,761
East Antrim	CC	69,936	64,907
East Londonderry	CC	72,213	69,359
Fermanagh and South Tyrone	CC	74,643	72,945
Foyle	CC	69,890	74,431
Lagan Valley	CC	76,332	75,884
Mid Ulster	CC	70,094	70,501
Newry and Armagh	CC	74,585	81,329
North Antrim	CC	71,165	77,156
North Down	CC	70,412	67,109
South Antrim	CC	71,646	71,915
South Down	CC	71,772	79,295
Strangford	CC	70,070	66,990
Upper Bann	CC	76,969	83,028
West Tyrone	CC	70,614	66,339

Belfast South and Mid Down is a new constituency, replacing the former Belfast South constituency which had a much smaller area. All of the others have undergone boundary changes, primarily to bring the electorate within the range of 69,724 to 77,062 as required by the Parliamentary Constituencies Act 1986, as amended in 2020.

=== 2010–2025 ===
Constituencies from 2010

Under the Fifth Periodic Review, the following configuration of constituencies was adopted in 2008. They were used in four general elections: 2010, 2015, 2017 and 2019, and also in four Assembly elections: 2011, 2016, 2017 and 2022.

=== 1997–2010 ===
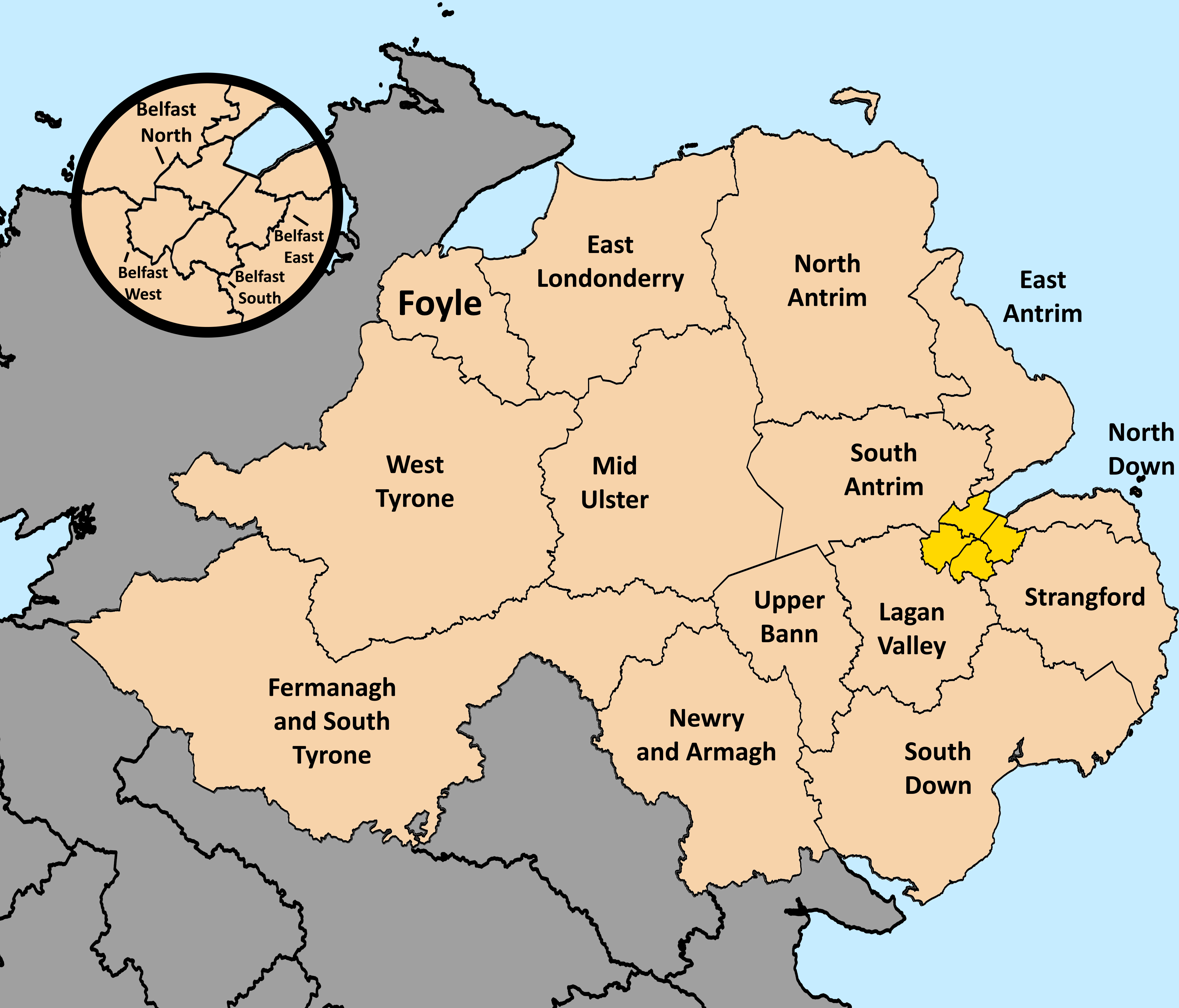
Constituencies from 1997

Under the Fourth Periodic Review, the following configuration of constituencies was adopted in 1995. They were used in three general elections: 1997, 2001 and 2005, and also in four Northern Ireland-wide elections: the Forum election in 1996, and the Assembly elections in 1998, 2003 and 2007.

=== 1983–1997 ===
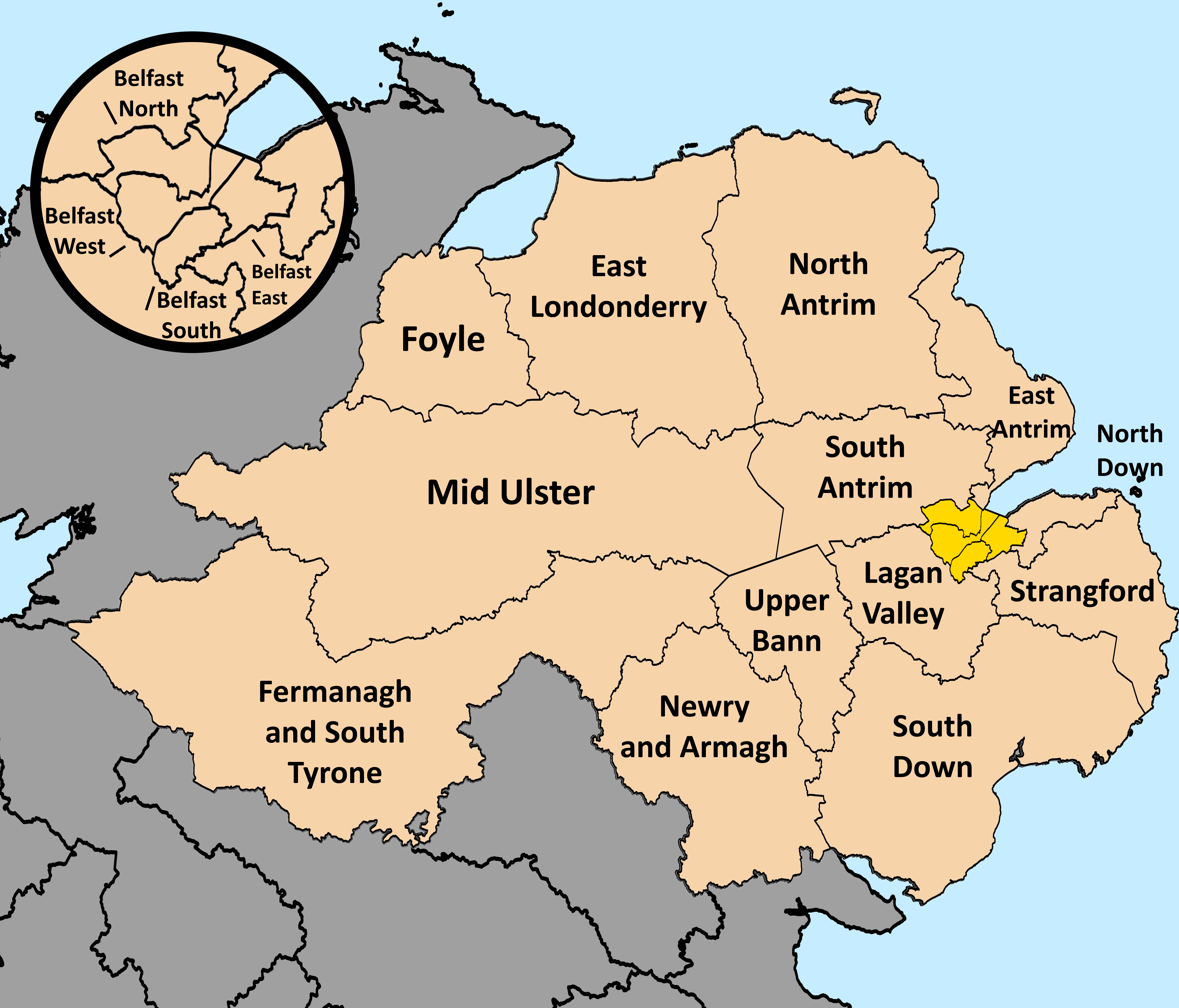
Constituencies from 1983

Under the House of Commons (Redistribution of Seats) Act 1979, the number of seats permitted for Northern Ireland was increased from 12 to "not greater than 18 or less than 16". This followed the abolition of the Parliament of Northern Ireland under the Northern Ireland Constitution Act 1973.

Under the Third Periodic Review, the following configuration of constituencies was adopted in 1982, with an increase from 12 to 17 constituencies. They were used in three general elections: 1983, 1987, and 1992.

=== 1974–1983 ===
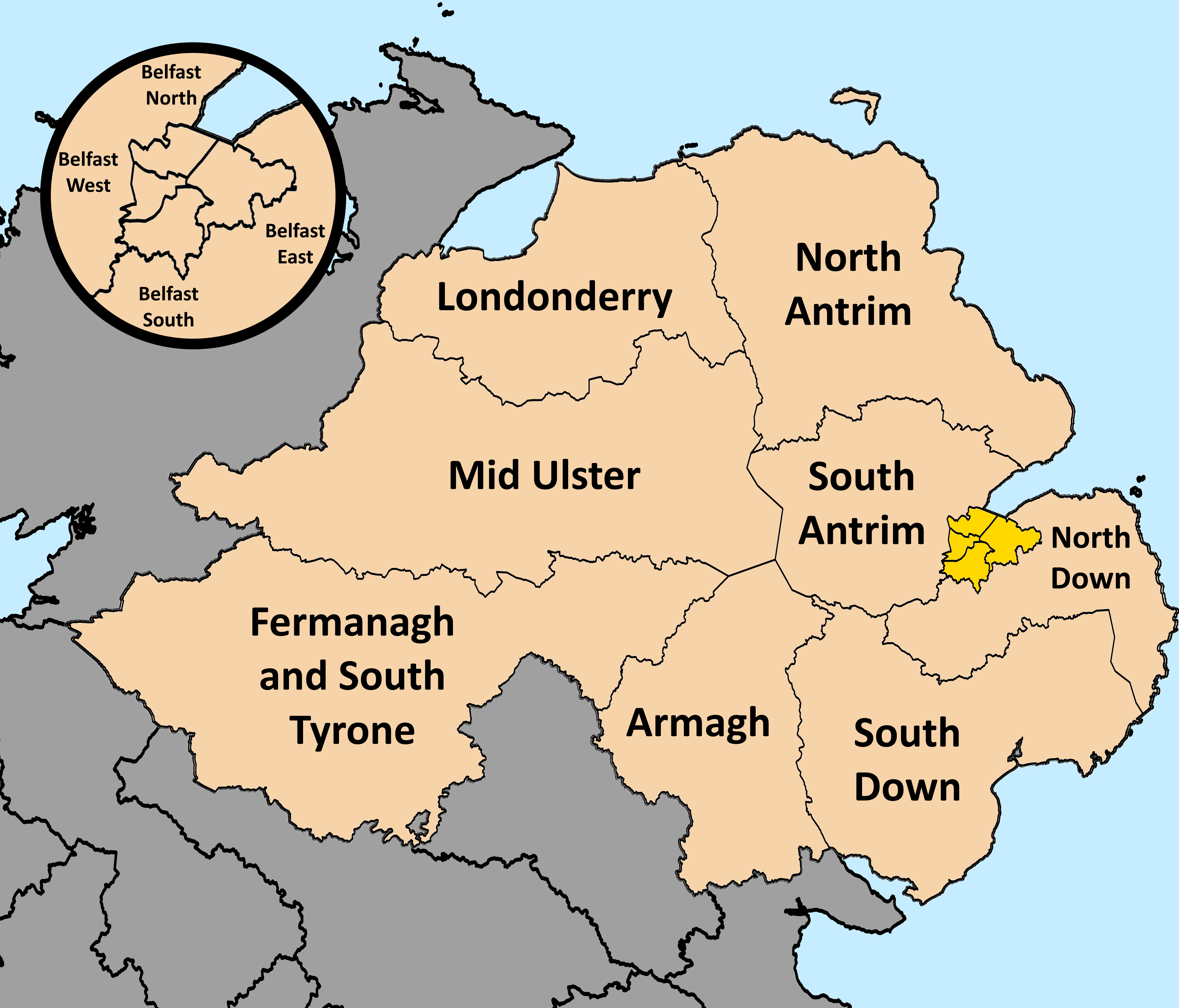
Constituencies from 1974

Under the Second Periodic Review, the following configuration of constituencies was adopted in November 1970, after the general election earlier that year. They were used in three general elections: February 1974, October 1974, and 1979, and also in three Northern Ireland-wide elections: the 1973 Assembly election, the 1975 Constitutional Convention election, and the 1982 Assembly election.

=== 1950–1974 ===
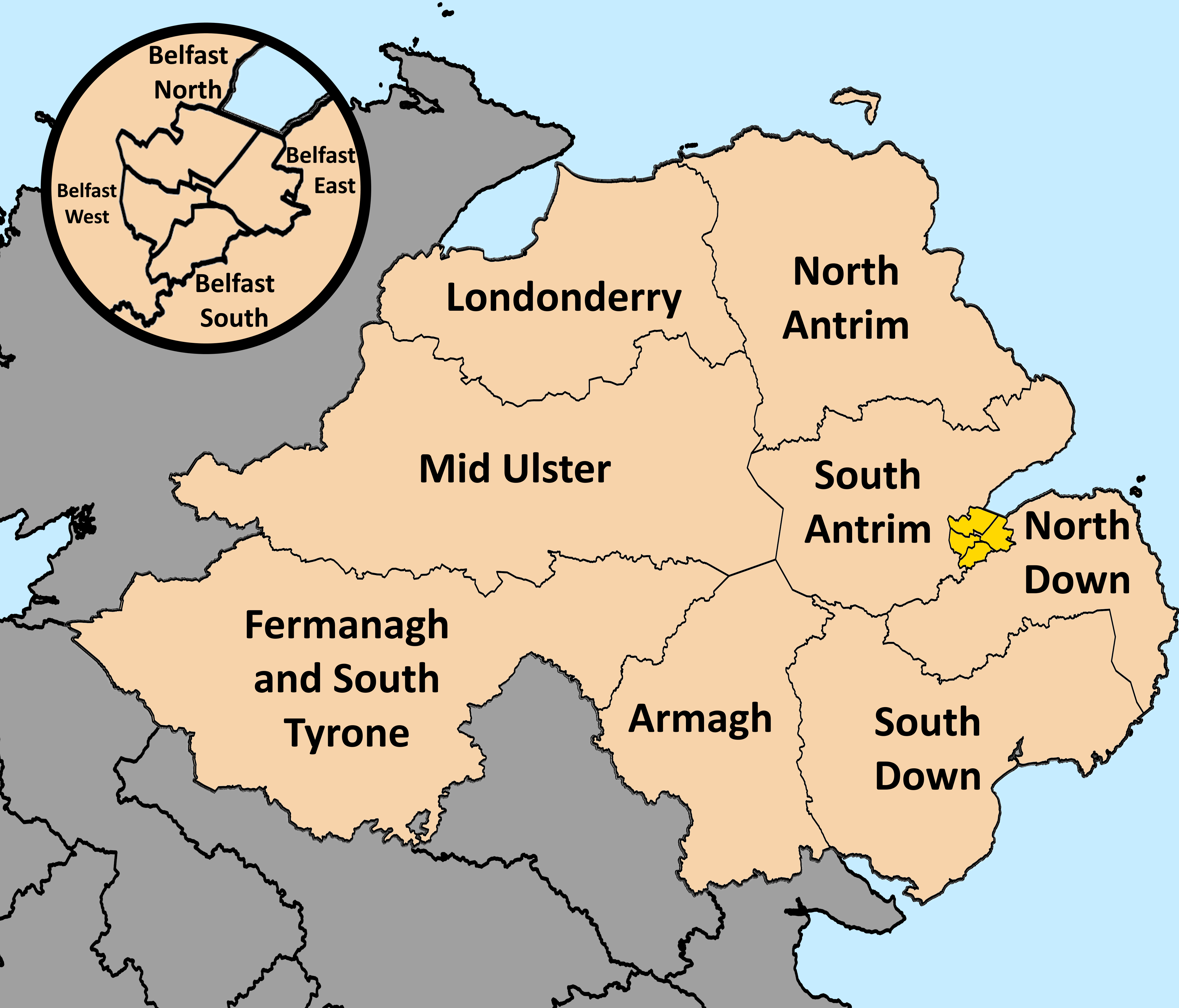
Constituencies from 1950

Under the Representation of the People Act 1948, the following configuration of constituencies was adopted. They were used in seven general elections: 1950, 1951, 1955, 1959, 1964, 1966 and 1970.

The First Periodic Review, which reported in 1954 and took effect at the 1955 United Kingdom general election, made no changes to the number or boundaries of Northern Ireland constituencies.

The introduction of these constituencies accompanied the abolition of the Queen's University of Belfast constituency. It also abolished the two-member constituencies.

Under the new boundaries, Antrim was split into two single-member constituencies: North Antrim and South Antrim. Down was likewise split into North Down and South Down. Tyrone and Fermanagh was split into Fermanagh and South Tyrone in the south, and Mid Ulster in the north, which also gained further area from the Londonderry constituency.

=== 1922–1950 ===
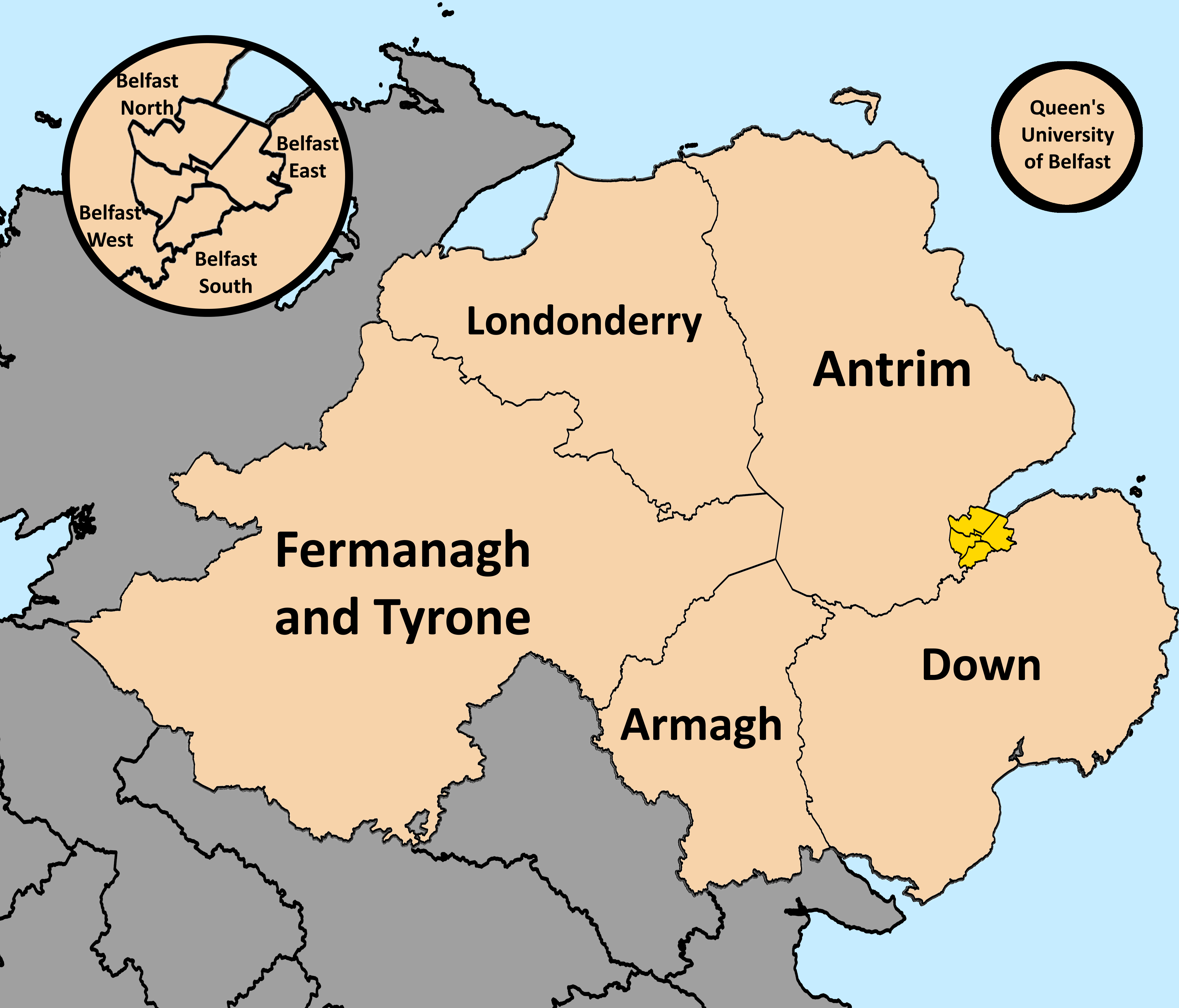
Constituencies from 1922

Under the Government of Ireland Act 1920, Northern Ireland was created on 3 May 1921, and the number of seats at Westminister in the area it covered was reduced in number from 30 to 13, across 10 constituencies.

Under these boundaries, Antrim, Down, and Fermanagh and Tyrone each elected two MPs using the bloc voting system, and Northern Ireland had one university constituency, the Queen's University of Belfast constituency. As with other university constituencies in the UK, the QUB constituency elected 1 MP by the graduates of the university, regardless of where they resided, in addition to any other vote they might have.

== See also ==
- Politics of Northern Ireland
