= Francis Needham =

Francis Needham may refer to:

- Francis Needham, 1st Earl of Kilmorey (1748–1832), Anglo-Irish soldier and Member of Parliament
- Francis Needham, 2nd Earl of Kilmorey (1787–1880), Anglo-Irish peer and Member of Parliament
- Francis Needham, 3rd Earl of Kilmorey (1842–1915), Anglo-Irish peer and Member of Parliament
- Francis Needham, 4th Earl of Kilmorey (1883–1961), Royal Navy officer and Anglo-Irish peer
- Francis Needham, Viscount Newry (1815–1851), Anglo-Irish Member of Parliament
