= Thomas Francis Knox =

Anglo-Irish ultramontane Roman Catholic priest and author

Father Francis Knox (born as Thomas Francis Knox; 24 December 1822 – 20 March 1882, London) was an Ulster-Scots ultramontane Roman Catholic priest and author, known for his historical writings and translations.

== Early life and education ==
Knox was born in Brussels, the eldest son in a family connected to the Protestant Irish peerage. His father John Henry Knox, Tory MP for Newry, was the third son of Thomas Knox, 1st Earl of Ranfurly. His mother was Lady Mabella Josephine Needham, daughter of Francis Needham, 1st Earl of Kilmorey.

He was educated at a Hampshire private school and attended Trinity College, Cambridge, graduating in 1845.

== Career ==
Knox became a Roman Catholic convert, in 1845 under the influence of Frederick William Faber. Encouraged to travel for two years by his concerned father, Knox hoped to see Mexico but was lucky to survive a shipwreck off Yucatán. Continuing to the United States, he decided to prepare for ordination in France. Invited to Rome for papal instruction by John Henry Newman in 1847, Knox proceeded as an Oratorian novice, taking Francis as his name in religion, as Father Francis Knox, with half a dozen priests. The rest of his life centred on the Oratorian group in England.

The group based at the Birmingham Oratory divided in April 1849. Together with Faber, Knox set up the London Oratory. The splitting up of the original Oratorian group was partly driven by personal difficulties, and in particular Newman’s attitude to Knox, who was proving troublesome. From 1865 to 1868 Knox served a term as superior of the London Oratory.

Knox has been called "the most learned of all the fathers of that time". He translated the autobiography of Henry Suso in 1865. In 1867 he defended a maximalist interpretation of the doctrine of Papal infallibility, though in a "dry and moderate tone". Appointed Westminster diocesan archivist when Cardinal Manning put the Oratorians in charge of the diocesan archives in 1876, he edited several volumes of English Catholic records.

== Works ==
- The Life of Blessed Henry Suso by Himself (translation, 1865)
- When Does The Church Speak Infallibly? or, the nature and scope of the church's teaching office (1867)
- The Last Survivor of the Ancient English Hierarchy, Thomas Goldwell, Bishop of St. Asaph (1876). Originally appeared in The Month, Jan–Feb 1876. Republished in Thomas Edward Bridgett, Queen Elizabeth and the Catholic Hierarchy (1889)
- (ed. with introduction) The First And Second Diaries Of The English College, Douay (1878)
- (ed. with introduction) The Letters and Memorials of William Cardinal Allen (1882)
