= Alexander Blake =

Alexander Blake may refer to:

- Alexander Blake (MP) (fl.1650), English MP for Peterborough
- Alexander Blake (cricketer) (born 1989), English cricketer
- Alexander Blake (martyr) (c.1564–1590), English Catholic priest and martyr

== See also ==
- Alex Blake (disambiguation)
