= Henry Thomson (Irish politician) =

Irish Justice of the Peace and Conservative politician

Henry Thomson (1840 – 30 December 1916) was an Irish justice of the peace and Conservative politician. From 1880 to 1885 he was a member of parliament, representing Newry in the House of Commons of the United Kingdom of Great Britain and Ireland, of which the whole of Ireland was then a part.

Born in 1840, Thomson was the second son of Henry Thomson of Newry, County Down, by his marriage to Anne, daughter of the Rev. William Henry, of Tassagh, County Armagh. He was educated at Trinity College, Dublin. In 1866, he married Alice Cecilia, the youngest daughter of Henry Corbet-Singleton of Aclare, County Meath.

He was a significant supporter of hare-coursing, and from 1878 onwards kept his own pack of harriers, described in 1886 as "consisting of thirteen couples, average height seventeen inches", with kennels at Newry, but with a hunting country more in County Armagh than County Down. He was also for a time Master of the Newry Harriers, but by 1886 had been succeeded as Master by Thomas D'Arcy Hoey JP.

In 1893, his name was published as one of the "six hundred gentlemen" of the new Ulster Defence Union.

In London, Thomson was a member of the Carlton Club. At the time of his death on 30 December 1916, his address was given in Who's Who as Scarvagle House, Scarva, Co. Newry (sic).

Parliament of the United Kingdom
Preceded by William Whitworth	Member of Parliament for Newry; 1880 – 1885	Succeeded by Justin Huntly McCarthy
