= Denis Caulfield Brady =

Irish politician; Member of UK Parliament

Denis Caulfield Brady JP DL (1804 – 30 November 1886) was a Whig Member of the Parliament of the United Kingdom who represented the constituency of Newry. He was a native of Newry, the son of Thomas Brady and Rose Caulfield, and educated at Trinity College Dublin. He was a reformer, in favour of the emancipation of Catholics and the abolition of tithes, and he was elected through the support of the poor Catholics of Newry. As a result of Brady's victory over Sir Thomas Staples in 1835, the Earl of Kilmorey evicted more than 80 families from his lands for their votes. Brady became Chairman of the Newry Navigation Company and was also a Magistrate and Lord Lieutenant for County Down. He remained a devoted member of the Liberal Party, into which the Whigs merged in 1859, but toward the end of his life he increasingly supported the Unionist cause. He died in Newry, aged 82.

Parliament of the United Kingdom
Preceded by Lord Marcus Hill	Member of Parliament for Newry; 1835 – 1837	Succeeded by John Ellis
