= Arthur Marcus Hill Cheek =

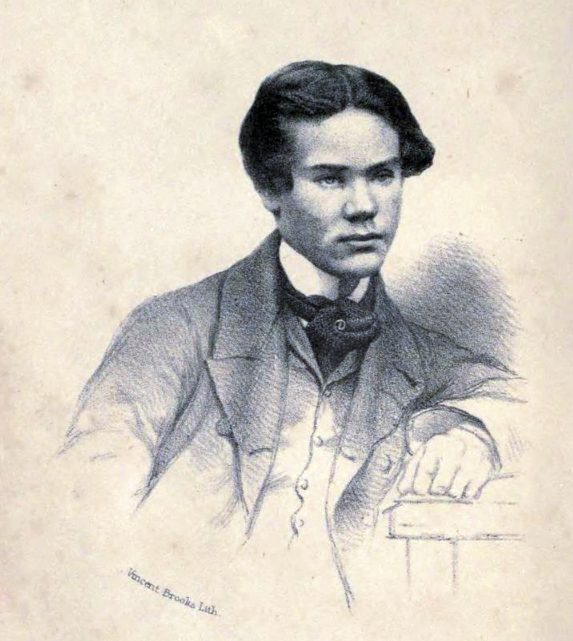
- Portrait of Cheek
- Born: 31 July 1840; Evesham, Worcestershire
- Died: 16 June 1857 (aged 16); Allahabad Fort, Allahabad
- Burial place: Allahabad Fort
- Military career
- Allegiance: East India Company
- Branch: Bengal Army
- Service years: 1857
- Rank: Ensign
- Nickname: "The young martyr of Allahabad"
- Units: 6th Regiment of Bengal Native Infantry

Ensign Arthur Marcus Hill Cheek (31 July 1840 – 16 June 1857) was a Bengal Army officer known posthumously as "the young martyr of Allahabad." Cheek joined the Bengal army in February 1857, and on 28 April arrived in India, where he was posted to the 6th Regiment of Bengal Native Infantry. On 6 June, the regiment mutinied as part of the Indian Rebellion of 1857, and Cheek was injured and captured by mutinous sepoys before dying of his injuries in captivity on 16 June. Cheek's fellow prisoners claimed that he had refused to renounce his Christian faith and convert to Islam while in captivity, thus transforming him into a martyr among Christian circles in Britain and India.

== Early life ==
Arthur Marcus Hill Cheek, the fourth child of Oswald Cheek and Emma Ashwin, was born on 31 July 1840 in Evesham, Worcestershire. He was given the names "Arthur Marcus Hill" in honour of his godfather, Arthur Marcus Hill, who was the MP for Evesham at the time of his birth. He was baptised on 15 August 1840 at the All Saints Church, Evesham.

== Military service and death ==
When Cheek was 16 his father obtained, with the help of Cheek's godfather, a commission in the East India Company's Presidency armies. He was not required to attend Addiscombe Military Seminary for the standard two years but was required to pass an examination, which he did on 3 February 1857. Cheek was subsequently commissioned as an ensign in the Bengal Army on 4 February 1857. He departed from Southampton on 20 March, arriving in Calcutta on 28 April. There, he was assigned to the 6th Regiment of Bengal Native Infantry, which was stationed in Allahabad. After taking leave for three weeks to visit family members who were living in India, Cheek made his way to his regiment, arriving at Allahabad on 19 May.

The Indian Rebellion of 1857 began at Meerut on 10 May 1857. The officers of the 6th had full confidence in their men and around 80 Indian sepoys of the unit formed the guard at Allahabad Fort. On the evening of 6 June, the officers were called out from the mess to the parade square by a bugle sounded by mutinous sepoys of the 6th, who then shot and killed them. Cheek escaped the massacre, as he had returned to his personal residence.

Cheek wounded by a sabre-wielding mutineer on that evening but managed to escape from Allahabad Fort, although the details of how he escaped were not recorded. After five days he was discovered badly injured in a ravine by mutineers of the 6th and taken prisoner. On the morning of 16 June, Cheek was brought into the fort on a stretcher. He died that same evening and was buried in the grounds of Allahabad Fort following a Christian funeral on the morning of 17 June.

== Account of "martyrdom" ==
An Indian Christian reverend, Gopenauth Nundy, claimed after Cheek's death that he was held captive with him in Allahabad Fort. Nundy alleged that attempts were made by their captors to convert them from Christianity to Islam by keeping them in stocks in the sun without water until they capitulated. He also claimed that Cheek said to him "Padre Sahib, hold onto your faith – don't give it up!" A fellow prisoner, a British woman named Mrs. Coleman, reported that Cheek told her to "be true to your faith and hope."

A memorial tablet, inscribed with the following, was placed on the Cheek family tomb in the graveyard next to the All Saints Church in Evesham:

"The young Martyr of Allahabad" Ensign in the 6th Bengal Native Infantry and 2nd son of O. and E Cheek. born 31 July 1840. He fell a victim to the wretched Indian Mutiny in 1857 and is memorable for his heroic conduct and faithful confession in his dying moments testified by the encouraging words which he then addressed to a native Christian catechist tormented by the Mohammedans "Come what may, do not deny the Lord Jesus." He was interred in the covered way of the Fort at Allahabad 17th June 1857.
