= Earl of Kilmorey =

Title in the Peerage of Ireland

Earldom of Kilmorey
- Arms: Argent, a Bend Azure, between two Bucks' Heads cabossed Sable. Crest: A Demi-Phoenix in flames proper. Supporters: Dexter: A Horse Argent; Sinister: A Stag proper.
- Creation date: 12 January 1822
- Created by: George IV
- Peerage: Peerage of Ireland
- First holder: Francis Needham, 12th Viscount Kilmorey
- Present holder: Richard Francis Needham, 6th Earl of Kilmorey
- Heir apparent: Robert Needham, Viscount Newry and Mourne
- Remainder to: The 1st Earl's heirs male of the body lawfully begotten
- Subsidiary titles: Viscount Kilmorey; Viscount Newry and Mourne
- Status: Extant
- Former seat: Mourne Park
- Motto: Nunc aut nunquam ("Now or never")

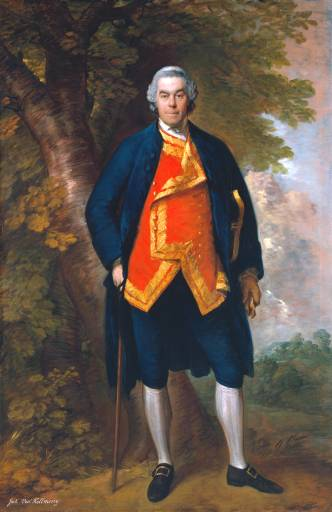
John Needham, 10th Viscount Kilmorey, by Thomas Gainsborough

Earl of Kilmorey (/kɪlˈmʊri/) is a title in the Peerage of Ireland. It was created in 1822 for Francis Needham, 12th Viscount Kilmorey, a General in the British Army and former Member of Parliament for Newry. He was made Viscount Newry and Mourne, in the County of Down, at the same time, also in the Peerage of Ireland.

The title of Viscount Kilmorey was created in the Peerage of Ireland in 1625 for Sir Robert Needham, Member of Parliament for Shropshire, and High Sheriff of Shropshire in 1606. His son, the second Viscount, represented Newcastle-under-Lyme in Parliament and supported King Charles I during the Civil War. His younger son, the fourth Viscount (who succeeded his elder half-brother), also fought as a Royalist in the Civil War. His great-great-grandson was the twelfth Viscount, who was created Earl of Kilmorey in 1822.

He was succeeded by his son, the second Earl. He also represented Newry in the House of Commons. His grandson, the third Earl, (son of Francis Jack Needham, Viscount Newry) was briefly Member of Parliament for Newry and sat in the House of Lords as an Irish representative peer from 1881 to 1915.

His eldest son, the fourth Earl, served as Lord Lieutenant of County Down and as Vice-Admiral of Ulster and Commanding Officer of HMS Caroline, Ulster Division Royal Naval Reserve. Lord Kilmorey was also an Irish Representative Peer from 1916 to 1961, becoming the last surviving Irish Representative Peer to sit in the House of Lords. He was succeeded by his nephew, the fifth Earl. He was the son of Major the Hon. Francis Edward Needham, second son of the third Earl.

As of 2017 the titles are held by the fifth Earl's eldest son, the sixth Earl, who succeeded in 1977. He does not use his titles and did not use his courtesy title of Viscount Newry and Mourne which he was entitled to from 1969 to 1977, and is known as Sir Richard Needham. He is a former Conservative government minister.

The Needham estate, known as Mourne Park, is near Kilkeel in County Down in Northern Ireland but the title and estate were separated when the fifth Earl inherited the title but opted to live in England. The Needham estate or Mourne Park is now owned by the Anley family, descendants of the 4th Earl of Kilmorey. The house was badly damaged by fire on 18 May 2013.

== Viscounts Kilmorey (1625) ==
- Robert Needham, 1st Viscount Kilmorey (died 1631)
- Robert Needham, 2nd Viscount Kilmorey (died 1653) son
- Robert Needham, 3rd Viscount Kilmorey (died 1657) son
- Charles Needham, 4th Viscount Kilmorey (died 1660) half-brother
- Robert Needham, 5th Viscount Kilmorey (1655–1668) son
- Thomas Needham, 6th Viscount Kilmorey (c. 1659–1687) brother
- Robert Needham, 7th Viscount Kilmorey (1683–1710) son
- Robert Needham, 8th Viscount Kilmorey (1702–1717) son
- Thomas Needham, 9th Viscount Kilmorey (1703–1768) brother
- John Needham, 10th Viscount Kilmorey (1710–1791) brother
- Robert Needham, 11th Viscount Kilmorey (1746–1818) son
- Francis Needham, 12th Viscount Kilmorey (1748–1832) (created Earl of Kilmorey in 1822) brother

== Earls of Kilmorey (1822) ==
- Francis Needham, 1st Earl of Kilmorey (1748–1832)
- Francis Jack Needham, 2nd Earl of Kilmorey (1787–1880)
- Francis Charles Needham, 3rd Earl of Kilmorey (1842–1915)
- Francis Charles Adelbert Henry Needham, 4th Earl of Kilmorey (1883–1961)
- Francis Jack Richard Patrick Needham, 5th Earl of Kilmorey (1915–1977)
- Richard Francis Needham, 6th Earl of Kilmorey (born 1942)

The heir apparent is the present holder's son Robert Francis John Needham, Viscount Newry and Mourne (born 1966).
The heir apparent's heir apparent is his son Hon. Thomas Francis Michael Needham (born 1998).
