= Alex Blake =

Alex Blake may refer to:

- Alex Blake (musician) (born 1951), American post-bop jazz double-bassist and electric bass guitarist
- Alex Blake (cricketer) (born 1989), English cricketer
- Alex Blake (Criminal Minds), fictional character
- Alex Blake (actor), British actor who played Zayan Scott in EastEnders

== See also ==
- Alexander Blake (disambiguation)
