= 1871 Newry by-election =

UK Parliamentary by-election

The 1871 Newry by-election was fought on 23 January 1871. The by-election was fought due to the death of the incumbent Liberal MP William Kirk. It was won by the unopposed Conservative candidate Viscount Newry and Morne. The Liberal Party narrowly won the seat at the 1874 general election.
