= Violet Needham =

British children's author

- Born: Amy Violet Needham; 5 June 1876 Mayfair, London
- Died: 8 June 1967 (aged 91) London, UK
- Occupation: Novelist, Juvenile Literature
- Genre: Fantasy, Historical, Contemporary
- Years active: 1939-1966
- Notable works: The Black Riders (1939), The Stormy Petrel (1942), The Woods of Windri (1944)
- Relatives: Charles Needham, illegitimate son of Francis Needham, 2nd Earl of Kilmorey (father) Henriëtte Amelia Charlotte Vincente Barones van Tuyll van Serooskerken (mother)

Amy Violet Needham (5 June 1876, Mayfair – 8 June 1967, London), was the author of 19 popular novels for children, a number of which, during the 1940s, were made widely available to the British public by BBC's The Children's Hour radio programme.

== Early life ==
Born at 9, John Street, Berkeley Square (now Chesterfield Gardens, W1), London, Needham was the daughter of Colonel Charles Needham, of the 1st Life Guards (illegitimate son of Francis Needham, 2nd Earl of Kilmorey) and Henriette Amélie Charlotte Vincentia (known as 'Amy'), daughter of Dutch aristocrat Vincent Gildemeester Baron van Tuyll van Serooskerken, who had made a fortune in East Indian tin. Charles Needham was a gambler and their finances fluctuated considerably. Violet and her sister Evelyn were educated at home, a common practice for women of their day and social standing.

Needham's early life, spent moving between houses large and small in England and on the continent, is seen as providing the basis for many of her books.

== Adult life ==
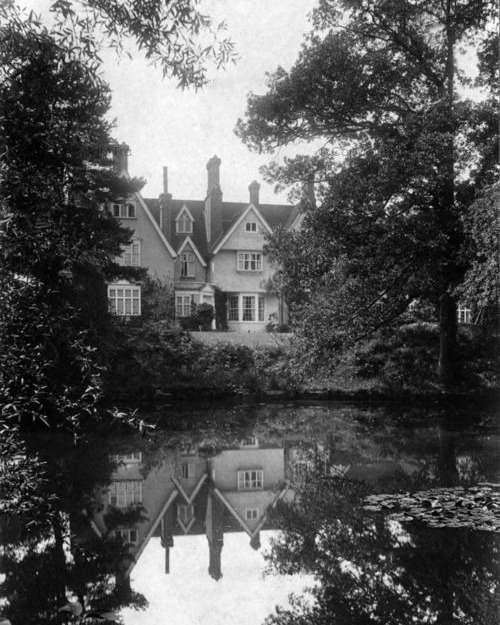
Tylehurst, Forest Row, East Sussex, 1909 (Needham ownership 1902-1935)

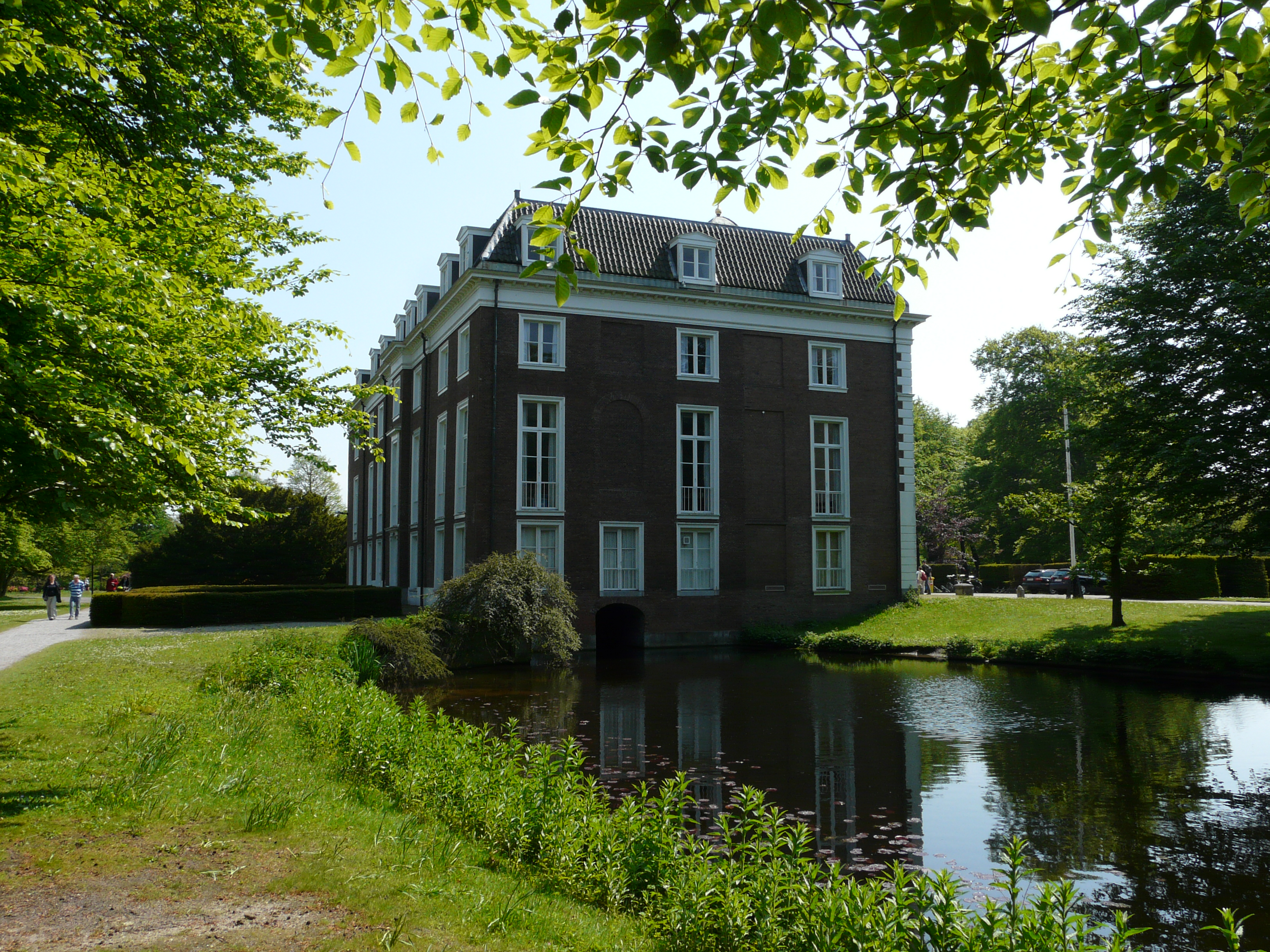
Huys Clingendael, "the house athwart the dark canal"

The family spent summer holidays in Europe, and lived there for six years when Needham and her sister were young women, their father being military attaché at Rome from 1895 to 1901. Needham and her family returned to England in 1902 when her mother bought Tylehurst, Forest Row, East Sussex, which would remain the family home for 35 years.

Still living at Tylehurst with her parents, Needham participated in the London season for some years. Summers the Needhams visited family on the continent. Needham's half Dutch mother had four sisters who had variously married English, Austrian, and Dutch nationals, this last the owner of Huys Clingendael, a convenient reunion locale where Needham told stories to younger cousins "Dutch, French, Austrian and English" but gave it up in favour of gardening and home pursuits. Her sister Evelyn married in 1903 and had four sons, and Needham was a devoted aunt, telling bedtime stories which formed the basis of the 'Stormy Petrel' adventures. Her attempts at being published were turned down on the grounds that the work was too difficult for children.

Needham befriended the explorer and alpinist Douglas William Freshfield (d. 1934), a contemporary of her father but with whom she shared many interests. After Freshfield's wife's death in 1911 it has been suggested that the two would have married but for the opposition of Freshfield's family. Following the deaths of Freshfield and her father Charles in 1934 (on the day of Diamond Wedding anniversary), and her mother Amy in 1936, Tylehurst was sold and Violet went to live in London.

Here, through a younger family member, she was able to present the manuscript of 'The Black Riders' to the publishing house William Collins, Sons. Once again, the work was decreed too difficult for children, but, following endorsement by the children of one of the Collins family directors, it was accepted for publication.

== Writing ==
Needham came to writing late in life, publishing her first book, The Black Riders, in 1939, at the age of 63. In her lifetime, she published nineteen novels; a twentieth, The Sword of St Cyprian, existed in a state of near-completion at the time of her death, and was published by the Violet Needham Society in 2003. Selections from the incomplete manuscript of her final book, An Accursed Heritage, appeared in the Society's journal Souvenir.

Her books can be divided into three groups: Ruritanian, historical, and contemporary. The eleven Ruritanian novels, sometimes known as the Empire series or the Stormy Petrel series, are set in three fictional countries in Eastern Europe: the Empire, Flavonia, and Ornowitza, the latter being a small duchy between the other two.

The Ruritanian novels fall into two groups. Some, like The Black Riders and The Stormy Petrel are set in the early twentieth century. Others, such as The Woods of Windri and The Changeling of Monte Lucio are set in an undefined mediaeval period with monasteries playing an important role.

Her first novel, The Black Riders, introduces the hero Dick Fauconbois, known as the "Stormy Petrel". He lives in the Empire, although he visits Flavonia during the course of the novel. It is the story of an orphan boy who becomes a member of a secret rebel movement led by a saint-like figure called Far-Away Moses. Their chief enemy is Count Jasper, known as Jasper the Terrible, the chief of the paramilitary Black Riders. The villain Jasper is described as a darkly attractive character, whose allure is felt by the main female heroine, Wych Hazel. The novelist and poet Michele Roberts described how her childhood reading of The Black Riders "both turned me on and made me feel guilty. Secret pleasure reading it; secret guilt."

Needham is known for writing "characters remarkable among the children's books of the period for having real moral dilemmas, and faults as well as virtues."

== Bibliography ==
=== Ruritanian ===
- The Black Riders (1939)
- The Emerald Crown (1940)
- The Stormy Petrel (1942)
- The Woods of Windri (1944)
- The House of the Paladin (1945)
- The Changeling of Monte Lucio (1946)
- The Betrayer (1950)
- Richard and the Golden Horse Shoe (1954)
- The Great House of Estraville (1955)
- The Secret of the White Peacock (1956)
- The Red Rose of Ruvina (1957)
- The Sword of St Cyprian (2003)

=== Contemporary ===
- The Horn of Merlyns (1943)
- The Bell of the Four Evangelists (1947)
- Pandora of Parrham Royal (1951)
- How Many Miles to Babylon? (1953)

=== Historical ===
- The Boy in Red (1948)
- The Avenue (1952)
- Adventures at Hampton Court (1954)
- Adventures at Windsor Castle (1957)

== Legacy ==
In the early 1950s, Needham left her London house to live with her widowed sister, subsequently giving up writing after a motor accident. The sisters died a day apart, Violet on the 8 June 1967 and Evelyn the next day.

In the 1940s Needham's books were broadcast on BBC's The Children's Hour, which brought her work to a wide audience in the UK. This young generation of readers included future writers like Auberon Waugh, Antonia Fraser, Ann Swinfen and A. S. Byatt. Needham invokes a romantic "otherwhere," and makes it familiar, with a subtle, understated magical tone. As one of the "Last of the Victorians," Needham occupies a position as a little known mother of modern fantasy, with early preoccupations with naming, the nature of magic, and heroism.
