= Patrick Needham, 5th Earl of Kilmorey =

Francis Jack Richard Patrick Needham, 5th Earl of Kilmorey (4 October 1915 – 12 April 1977), known as Patrick Needham and after 1961 as Patrick Kilmorey, was an Irish peer.

The son of Major the Hon. Francis Edward Needham, in turn a younger son of the 3rd Earl of Kilmorey, and of Blanche Esther Combe, he succeeded to his uncle's titles in 1961.

He did not inherit the Mourne Park Estate, the Needham family's country estate near Kilkeel in County Down, Northern Ireland, but instead inherited contents to the value of the estate. According to Sir Richard Needham (current Earl of Kilmorey, in his book Battling For Peace: Northern Ireland's Longest Serving British Minister (1999)), the fifth Earl did not believe any of his own family would wish to live in Northern Ireland again.

Norah, Countess of Kilmorey, his aunt and widow of the 4th Earl, continued to live at Mourne Park until her death in 1985 when the estate passed to other family members.

On 28 April, he married Helen Bridget Faudel-Phillips, daughter of Sir Lionel Faudel-Phillips, 3rd Baronet. They had three sons, including his heir Richard Needham.

Peerage of Ireland
Preceded by Francis Needham	Earl of Kilmorey; 1961–1977	Succeeded by Richard Needham
