= Christopher Bales =

English Catholic priest and martyr

Christopher Bales, also spelt Christopher Bayles, alias Christopher Evers (c.1564–1590), was an English Catholic priest and martyr. He was beatified in 1929.

== Biography ==
Christopher was born at Coniscliffe near Darlington, County Durham, England, about 1564. He entered the English College at Rome on 1 October 1583, but owing to ill-health was sent to the College at Reims. Bales suffered from consumption.

He was ordained on 28 March 1587 at Reims. Sent to England on 2 November 1588, he was soon arrested, racked and tortured by Topcliffe, and hung up by the hands for twenty-four hours at a time and "bore all most patiently".

Bales was tried and condemned for high treason on the charge of having been ordained beyond seas and coming to England to exercise his office. He asked Judge Anderson whether Augustine of Canterbury, Apostle of the English (who did the same), was also a traitor; the judge said no, but that the act had since been made treason by law.

He was executed on 4 March 1590, "about Easter", in Fleet Street (London), opposite Fetter Lane. On the gibbet was set a placard: "For treason and favouring foreign invasion". He spoke to the people from the ladder, saying that his only "treason" was his priesthood. On the same day, Nicholas Horner was executed in Smithfield for having made Bales a jerkin, and Alexander Blake for lodging him in his house.

== Alexander Blake ==
Alexander Blake was an ostler convicted of aiding Bale and was hanged outside his own door at Gray's Inn Lane.

== See also ==
- Catholic Church in the United Kingdom
- Douai Martyrs

== Sources ==
- Herbermann, Charles, ed. (1913). "Ven. Christopher Bales" . Catholic Encyclopedia. New York: Robert Appleton Company.
- John Gibbons, Concertatio Ecclesiae Catholicae in Anglia (Trier, 1589). (Formerly attributed to John Bridgewater).
- Richard Challoner, Memoirs
- John Hungerford Pollen, Acts of English Martyrs (London, 1891)
- Northern Catholic Calendar
- Thomas Francis Knox, Douay Diaries (London, 1878)
