= Peter Quinn (MP) =

Irish Conservative Party Member of the Parliament of the United Kingdom

Peter Quinn, was an Irish Conservative Party Member of the Parliament of the United Kingdom who represented the constituency of Newry from 1859 to 1865. He was a successful local businessman and land agent for several large estates in the Newry area. Two of his sons served in India, both with the Bengal Civil Service; John became Commissioner for Lucknow and Charles Commissioner for Bhaugalpore.

Parliament of the United Kingdom
Preceded by William Kirk	Member of Parliament for Newry; 1859 – 1865	Succeeded by Arthur Charles Innes
