= Edmund Gilling Hallewell =

British politician (1796–1881)

Edmund Gilling Hallewell (1796 – 5 November 1881) was an English politician and Irish Conservative Party Member of the Parliament of the United Kingdom who represented the constituency of Newry from 1851 to 1852.

Hallewell was born in Boroughbridge, Yorkshire, the second son of Reverend John Hallewell of Farnham. His mother, Ellen, was a daughter of Edmund Gilling of Marton-le-Moor, Yorkshire. He was educated at Ripon Grammar School.

In 1821, he married Martha Watts, only daughter and heir of Joseph Watts of Stratford House, Stroud, Gloucestershire. Their son Lieutenant-Colonel Edmund Hallewell (1822–1869) married Sophia Reid, the daughter of General Sir William Reid. In 1855, he married Anne Winthrop, the third daughter of Admiral Winthrop.

For 50 years, he was a Magistrate for Gloucestershire. He died at his home, Beauchamp House in Churcham, near Gloucester, aged 85.

Parliament of the United Kingdom
Preceded by Viscount Newry and Mourne	Member of Parliament for Newry; 1851 – 1852	Succeeded by William Kirk
