= Francis Needham, 3rd Earl of Kilmorey =

Anglo-Irish peer and Conservative Member of Parliament

The Right Honourable The Earl of Kilmorey KP ADC
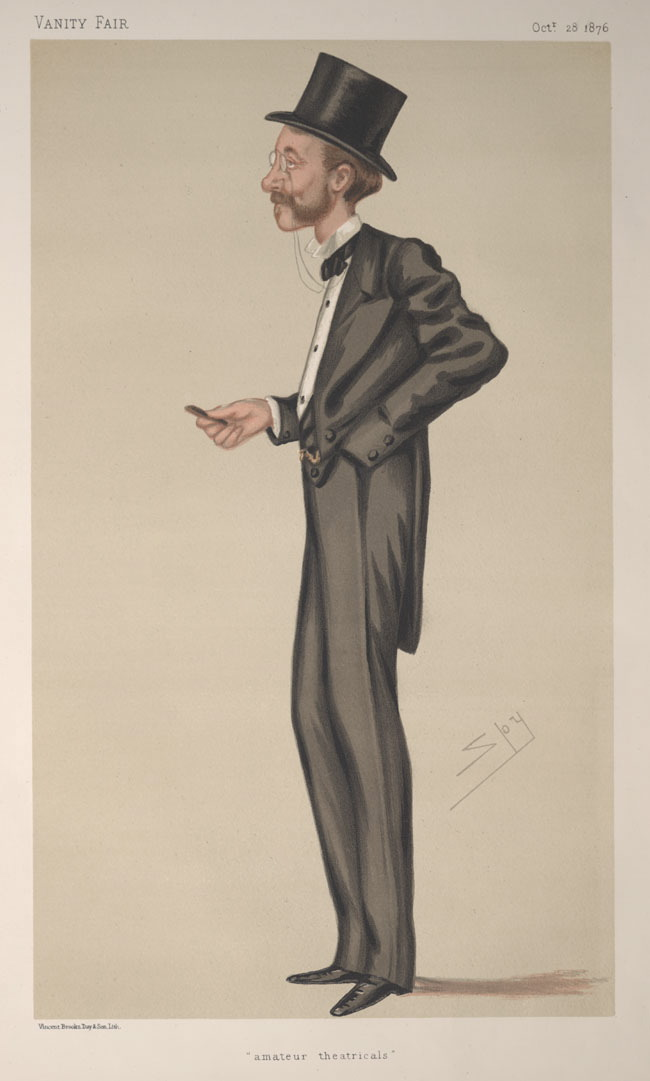
- "Amateur theatricals". Caricature of the Earl of Kilmorey by Spy published in Vanity Fair in 1876.

Personal details
- Born: Francis Charles Needham; 2 August 1842 London, England
- Died: 28 July 1915 (aged 72) London, England
- Party: Conservative
- Spouse: Ellen Constance Baldock (m. 1881)
- Children: Francis Needham, 4th Earl of Kilmorey
- Parent(s): Francis Needham, Viscount Newry; Anne Amelia Colville
- Education: Eton College
- Alma mater: Christ Church, Oxford
- Occupation: Politician

Military service
- Allegiance: United Kingdom
- Branch/service: British Army
- Years of service: 1865–96
- Rank: Colonel
- Unit: Yeomanry Force

Francis Charles Needham, 3rd Earl of Kilmorey KP ADC (2 August 1842 – 28 July 1915), styled Viscount Newry from 1851 to 1880, was an Anglo-Irish peer and Conservative Member of Parliament.

== Background and education ==
Kilmorey was the eldest son of Francis Needham, Viscount Newry, son of Francis Needham, 2nd Earl of Kilmorey. His mother was Anne Amelia Colville, daughter of General Sir Charles Colville. He attended Eton College and Christ Church, Oxford.

In 1862 (aged nineteen), Kilmorey proposed to give a ball; this was prohibited by the college authorities, chiefly by Charles Lutwidge Dodgson (better known as Lewis Carroll). The wife of Henry Liddell, the Dean of the college, had supported the ball; the Liddells' Irish residence was close to the Kilmorey seat of Mourne Park, and this favour to a family friend might have made social connections for her several daughters (including Alice). The ball and the resulting coldness between the Liddells and Carroll is mentioned in his diary as "Lord Newry's business". He graduated in 1864.

== Political career ==
In 1874 he served as High Sheriff of Down and was then elected to the House of Commons for Newry in 1871, a seat he held until 1874. In 1880 he succeeded his grandfather as Earl of Kilmorey, but as this was an Irish peerage it did not entitle him to an automatic seat in the House of Lords. However, the following year Kilmorey was elected an Irish representative peer, and sat in the House of Lords until his death in 1915. In 1890 he was made a Knight of the Order of St Patrick.

== Military career ==
As Viscount Newry, he was commissioned Cornet in the North Shropshire Yeomanry Cavalry in 1865, then promoted Captain in 1871, before the Cavalry were merged into the unified Shropshire Yeomanry regiment. He continued in the latter, being promoted Major in 1883 and becoming Lieutenant-Colonel in command of the regiment in 1889. He retired in 1896 and was made Honorary Colonel of the regiment.

After the accession of King Edward VII in 1901, Lord Kilmorey was appointed Aide-de-camp (Supernumerary) to His Majesty for the service of His Yeomanry Force. He also received the rank of colonel in the Yeomanry Force.

== Personal life ==
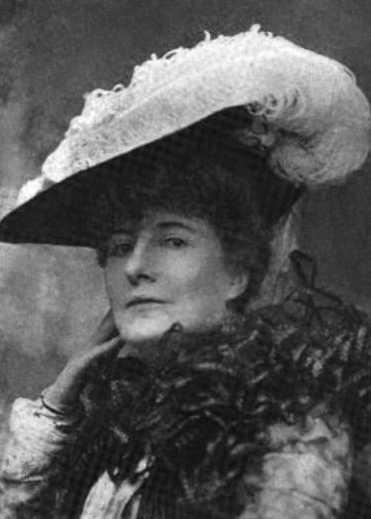
Ellen Constance Baldock

Lord Kilmorey married in 1881 Ellen Constance Baldock, daughter of Edward Holmes Baldock (MP for Shrewsbury). She was a renowned beauty who caused a scandal by being bequeathed the 'Teck emeralds' among other jewels, from her lover, Prince Francis of Teck, brother of Queen Mary. She also reputedly had a liaison with Edward VII, a frequent visitor to the Kilmorey estates at Mourne Park, County Down.

・Francis Charles Adelbert Henry 4th Earl of Kilmorey.

・Francis Edward (1886 - 1955) married Blanche Esther, daughter of Richard Combe and Constance Augusta (daughter of George Conyngham, 3rd Marquess Conyngham) has issue Patrick Needham, 5th Earl of Kilmorey.

・Cynthia Almina Constance Mary married George Child Villiers, 8th Earl of Jersey.

Lord Kilmorey died in July 1915, aged 72, of pleurisy and pneumonia at his Mayfair townhouse at 5 Aldford Street. He was buried at Kilkeel, County Down. Lady Kilmorey died in 1920.

Parliament of the United Kingdom
Preceded by William Kirk	Member of Parliament for Newry; 1871–1874	Succeeded by William Whitworth
Political offices
Preceded by The Viscount Bangor	Representative peer for Ireland; 1881–1915	Succeeded by The Earl of Cavan
Peerage of Ireland
Preceded by Francis Jack Needham	Earl of Kilmorey; 1880–1915	Succeeded by Francis Charles Adelbert Henry Needham
