= William Whitworth (politician) =

British politician

William Whitworth Esq

Member of Parliament for Newry
- In office 1874–1880
- Preceded by: Viscount Newry
- Succeeded by: Henry Thomson

Mayor of Drogheda
- In office 1876–1876

Sheriff of Drogheda
- In office 1869–1869

Personal details
- Born: August 23, 1813 Ashton-under-Lyne, Lancashire, England
- Died: December 28, 1886 (aged 73) Drogheda, Ireland
- Party: Liberal
- Occupation: Chief Engineer Russian Admiralty, cotton manufacturer, politician

William Whitworth (23 August 1813 – 28 December 1886) was a British cotton manufacturer and politician. He was a Liberal Member of the Parliament of the United Kingdom and represented the constituency of Newry, Ireland from 1874 to 1880.

Whitworth was born in Manchester, Lancashire, to Nicholas Whitworth, an iron maker, and Sarah Barratt, and was baptised in a Methodist church. He was a prominent local businessman, being a partner with his brother in Benjamin Whitworth and Brothers, who established The Boyne Cotton Mills that employed over 3,000 people around Drogheda, Ireland. He was sheriff of Drogheda in 1869 and mayor in 1876.

He married Maria Martin (1820-1845) on 6 December 1840 in Nikolaev, Russia while William was employed as a Chief Engineer by the Russian Admiralty. They had three children together: Sarah (born 1841), William (born 1843) and Richard (born 1844). William was retained in Russia throughout the duration of the Crimean War (1845-1855). Maria died in 1845. William later married Katherine Wright and they had a daughter Sophia in 1849.

Whitworth died at his home in Drogheda, after suffering a stroke, on 28 December 1886.

Parliament of the United Kingdom
Preceded by Viscount Newry	Member of Parliament for Newry; 1874 – 1880	Succeeded by Henry Thomson
