= Ulster Defence Union =

UDU emblem, featuring the motto Quis Separabit? (Who shall Separate?).

The Ulster Defence Union was a unionist organization formed in 1893 to oppose the Irish Home Rule movement, following a rally at the Ulster Hall, Belfast. Its principal aim was to resist the Second Home Rule Bill of 1893.

The UDU was launched by the publication of a manifesto on 17 March 1893, the signatories of which included Colonel Edward Saunderson, MP. Shortly after its creation, it adopted the motto Quis Separabit? (Who shall Separate?) The structure of the new Union was set out in a "Plan of Organisation" which was signed by Daniel Dixon, Lord Mayor of Belfast and President of the Provisional Committee.

On 1 September 1893, the Second Home Rule Bill was passed by the House of Commons by 347 votes to 304, but when it came to the House of Lords it was heavily defeated, by 419 votes to only 41. By October 1893, the UDU had a Central Assembly described as comprising six hundred gentlemen, which first met on 24 October 1893, from among whom an executive committee of forty was elected. This committee also included, ex officio, the Ulster Unionist members of both houses of parliament. In October 1893, at an Ulster Defence Union meeting in Belfast, Saunderson said, celebrating the scale of opposition in the Lords: "Home Rule is dead. It was dissected in the House of Commons, buried in the House of Lords, and even the Irish people would not trouble to give it a wake."

Eventually, in 1905, the organization took part in the formation of the Ulster Unionist Council, which was a precursor of the Ulster Unionist Party.

== See also ==
- Irish Home Rule movement
- Ulster Unionism
- Ulster Unionist Council
- Ulster Unionist Party
- Ulster Covenant
- Ulster Volunteers
- Irish Unionist Alliance
- United Irish League
