= Justin Huntly McCarthy =

Irish writer, historian and nationalist politician (1859–1936)

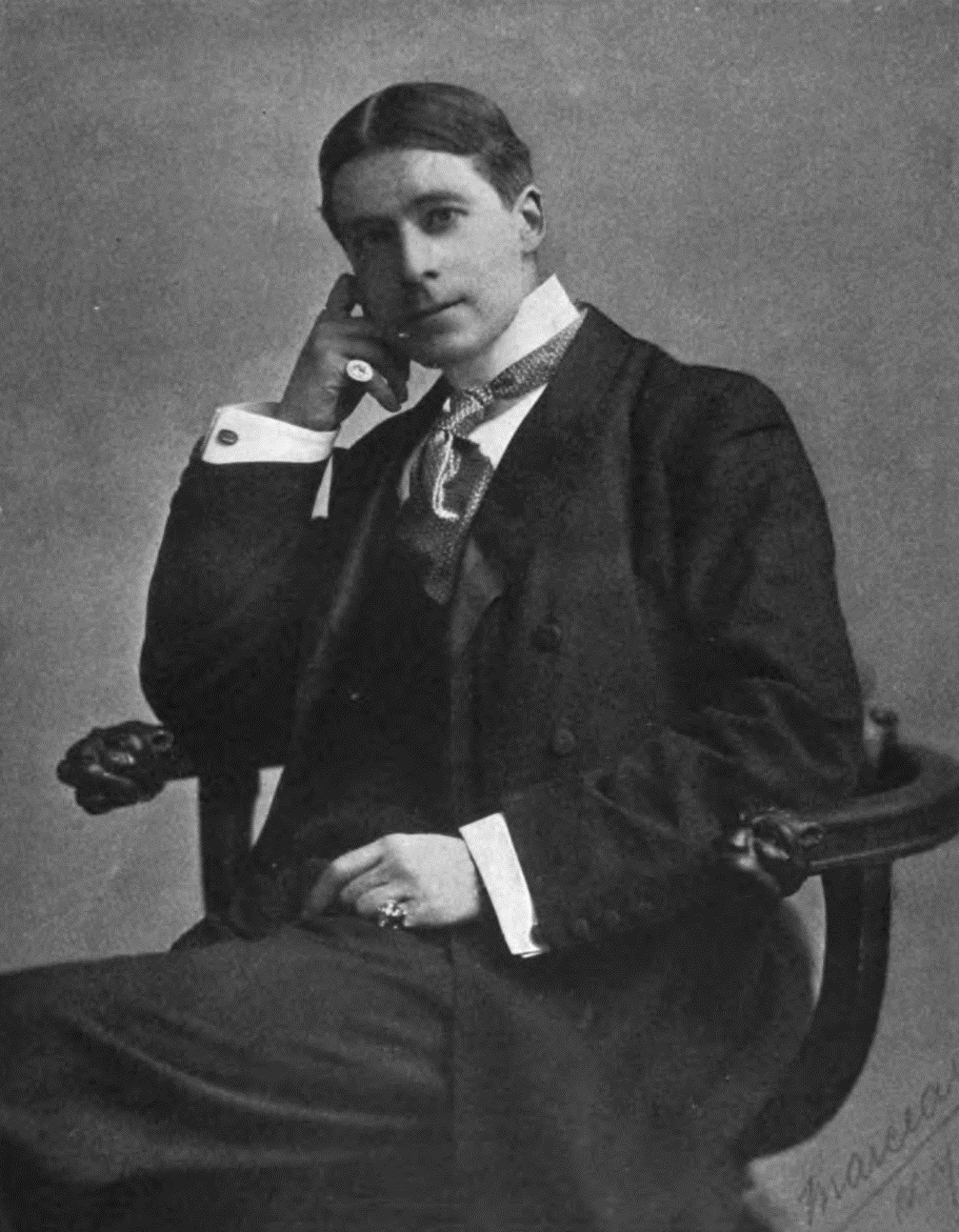

Member of Parliament for Athlone
- In office 1884–1885
- Preceded by: John James Ennis
- Succeeded by: Constituency abolished

Member of Parliament for Newry
- In office 1885–1892
- Preceded by: Henry Thomson
- Succeeded by: Patrick Carvill

Personal details
- Born: 1859
- Died: 20 March 1936 Putney, London, England
- Party: Home Rule League; Irish Parliamentary Party
- Spouses: Cecilia Loftus (1893-1899); Loullie Killick (1908-1936)
- Parent: Justin McCarthy (father)

Justin Huntly McCarthy (1859 – 20 March 1936) was an Irish writer, historian, and nationalist politician. He was a Member of Parliament (MP) from 1884 to 1892, taking his seat in the House of Commons of the United Kingdom.

He was the son of Justin McCarthy (1830–1912). Since both father and son were writers, historians, and Members of Parliament, they are sometimes confused in lists and compilations.

== Political career ==
McCarthy was first elected to Parliament at a by-election on 12 June 1884, when he was returned unopposed as the Home Rule League member for Athlone, following the death of the Liberal MP Sir John James Ennis.

Athlone lost its status as a parliamentary borough under the Redistribution of Seats Act 1885, and at the 1885 general election McCarthy stood instead in the borough of Newry in County Down, where he was returned unopposed for the Irish Parliamentary Party. He was re-elected in 1886, with a comfortable majority over the Liberal Unionist Reginald Saunders, but did not contest the 1892 election.

== Writing ==
McCarthy wrote various novels, plays, poetical pieces and short histories. He was briefly married to the actress Cissie Loftus. They married in Edinburgh in 1894, and though they divorced in 1899, in 1901 she originated the role of Katherine de Vaucelles, the heroine in If I Were King.

Among other works, he wrote biographies of Sir Robert Peel (1891), Pope Leo XIII (1896) and William Ewart Gladstone (1898). In 1889 he published prose translations of 466 quatrains of the Rubaiyat of Omar Khayyam. He also wrote:

In 1893, he translated some Gazels from Divan of Hafiz, the 14th century Persian poet, which was published in a 152-page volume by David Nutt. 1000 copies were made, 800 for England and 200 for America.

- Serapion and Other Poems (1883)
- Outline of Irish History (1883)
- England under Gladstone, 1880-1885, 2nd ed. (1885)
- Doom (1886)
- Our Sensation Novel (1886)
- Hafiz in London (1886)
- Lady Burton's Edition of Her Husband's Arabian Nights Translated Literally from the Arabic (1886-1888); Prepared for Household Reading by Justin Huntly McCarthy, MD; 6 vols.; London: Waterlow & Sons, Limited, London Wall.
- The Case for Home Rule (1887)
- Camiola, a Girl with a Fortune (1888)
- An outline of Irish history: from the earliest times to the present day (1890)
- Lily Lass (1890)
- The Fate of Fenella: A Novel, co-written in 1892.
- Divan of Hafiz, Gazels, translated by J H McCarthy London: D.Nutt (1893)
- Modern England (1898)
- Michel de Montaigne, Essayes of Montaigne (1899) Justin Huntly McCarthy Editor
- Cissie Loftus: An Appreciation (1899)
- Reminiscences (2 vols., 1899)
- A Short History of the United States (1899)
- A Woman of Impulse (1899) was made into a film in 1918 Woman of Impulse
- The French Revolution, (1890 Vols 1,2 & 1897 Vols 3,4)
- A History of the Four Georges (and of William IV) (1901) with Justin McCarthy
- If I Were King (1901) Garden Theatre (New York), (1902) St James's Theatre (London)), which was named "Best Play of the 1901–02 Broadway Season", and was adapted into the 1925 operetta The Vagabond King, its 1930 film version, its 1956 film version, and the 1938 film If I Were King.
- The Reign of Queen Anne (1902)
- Marjorie (1903)
- The Proud Prince (1903), the play opened at The Lyceum, Broadway, NY on 2 Nov 1903.
- The lady of Loyalty house (1904)
- The Dryad (1905)
- The flower of France (1906)
- The illustrious O'Hagan (1906)
- Needles and Pins (1907)
- Seraphica: A Romance (1907)
- The Duke's Motto: A Melodrama (1908)
- The god of love (1909)
- The gorgeous Borgia: a romance (1909)
- The O'Flynn: A Novel (1910)
- The king over the water: or, The marriage of Mr. Melancholy (1911)
- A health unto His Majesty (1912)
- Calling the Tune (1913) it was made into a musical film in 1936, Calling the Tune.
- Fool of April (1914)
- The Glorious Rascal (Pretty Maids All in a Row) (1915)
- Nurse Benson (1919)
- Henry Elizabeth (1920)
- The Golden Shoe (1921)

== Family life ==
McCarthy married musical artist Cecilia Loftus in 1893 in Edinburgh, Scotland, but the marriage did not last long and was dissolved in 1899. He married again in 1908 to Loullie Killick. McCarthy died at his home in Putney on 20 March 1936.

Parliament of the United Kingdom
Preceded by Sir John Ennis, Bt	Member of Parliament for Athlone; 1884 – 1885	Constituency abolished
Preceded by Henry Thomson	Member of Parliament for Newry; 1885 – 1892	Succeeded by Patrick Carvill
