= John Ellis (Newry MP) =

Irish Conservative Party Member of the Parliament

Member of Parliament for Newry
- In office 1837–1841

Personal details
- Born: 21 November 1812 Ireland
- Died: Unknown
- Party: Conservative
- Spouse: Ellen Knollys (m. 1835)

John Ellis (21 November 1812 – unknown date of death) was an Irish Conservative Party Member of the Parliament of the United Kingdom who represented the constituency of Newry from 1837 to 1841.

Ellis was born in November 1812, the fourth of ten sons. His father, John, was a barrister and was descended from an ancient Cornish family. Ellis lived in Youghal and married Ellen Knollys in December 1835.

Parliament of the United Kingdom
Preceded by Denis Caulfield Brady	Member of Parliament for Newry; 1837 – 1841	Succeeded by Viscount Newry and Morne
