= John Mooney (Irish politician) =

Irish politician

Sir John Joseph Mooney KBE JP (1874 – 12 April 1934) was an Irish nationalist politician. He was a Member of Parliament (MP) from 1900 to 1918, taking his seat as an Irish Parliamentary Party member of the House of Commons of what was then the United Kingdom of Great Britain and Ireland. He was a member of a prominent Dublin business and pub-owning family, J G Mooney & Co plc.

At the general election in October 1900, Mooney stood as the nationalist candidate in County Dublin South, where the agricultural reformer Horace Plunkett had held the seat for the Unionists since 1892. However, Plunkett's conciliatory approach to nationalists led to hardline unionists backing an independent unionist candidate, splitting the unionist vote, and Mooney won the seat with 43% of the votes, becoming the youngest member of the House of Commons.

Mooney did not stand again in South Dublin, where the unionists reunited at the 1906 general election and regained the seat. He stood instead in the safer nationalist territory of the Newry constituency in County Down, where he was returned to Westminster with a slim majority over his only opponent, an Independent Nationalist candidate.

At the January 1910 election, he was returned with a two-to-one majority over a unionist opponent, and in December 1910 he was returned unopposed, holding the seat until the parliamentary borough of Newry was abolished at the 1918 general election.

Mooney was one of the younger members of John Redmond's inner circle. He was Redmond's Parliamentary Private Secretary, and also treasurer of the Irish Parliamentary Party. After 1918 he pursued a career at the English Bar. He was also knighted after the war, for services to the Crown in connection with the war. He was married to Ethel Macmillan in 1912, who was possibly a relative or Harold Macmillan the British Prime Minister.

Parliament of the United Kingdom
Preceded by Horace Plunkett	Member of Parliament for County Dublin South; 1900 – 1906	Succeeded by Walter Long
Preceded by Patrick Carvill	Member of Parliament for Newry; 1906 – 1918	Constituency abolished
