= Patrick Carvill =

Irish politician (1839–1924)

Patrick George Hamilton Carvill (1839 – 10 January 1924) was an Irish Liberal and nationalist politician. He was a Member of Parliament (MP) for Newry from 1892 to 1906, taking his seat as an Irish Parliamentary Party member of the House of Commons of what was then the United Kingdom of Great Britain and Ireland.

Carvill first stood for Parliament at the 1880 general election, when he was a Liberal candidate in Newry, but he lost the seat by a margin of 5% to a Conservative candidate. He did not stand again until the 1892 general election, when he won the seat as an Anti-Parnellite Irish National Federation candidate, defeating both a Unionist and a Parnellite opponent. He was re-elected in 1895 with a wide margin, and when the Irish Parliamentary Party (IPP) reunited for the 1900 general election was returned unopposed as an IPP candidate. He lost the seat at the general election in January 1906, when he stood as an Independent Nationalist, and was defeated by John Mooney, the IPP candidate and outgoing MP for South Dublin.

Parliament of the United Kingdom
Preceded by Justin Huntly McCarthy	Member of Parliament for Newry; 1892 – 1906	Succeeded by John Mooney
