= Marcus Sandys, 3rd Baron Sandys =

British politician

The Right Honourable The Lord Sandys
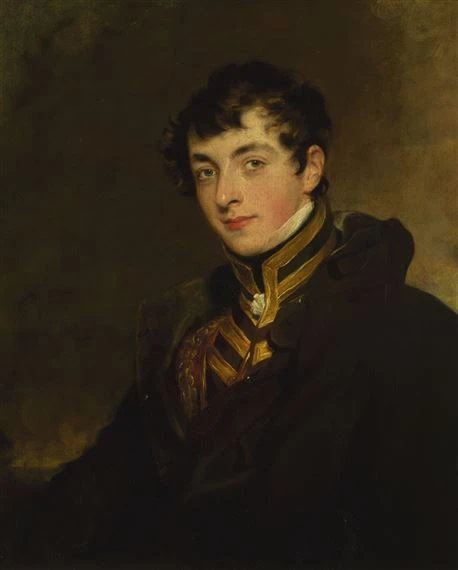
- Portrait by Thomas Lawrence

Treasurer of the Household
- In office 23 July 1847 – 21 February 1852
- Monarch: Victoria
- Prime Minister: Lord John Russell
- Preceded by: Lord Robert Grosvenor
- Succeeded by: Lord Claud Hamilton

Personal details
- Born: 28 January 1798
- Died: 10 April 1863 (aged 65)
- Party: Whig
- Spouse: Louisa Blake (d. 1886)

Arthur Marcus Cecil Sandys, 3rd Baron Sandys (28 January 1798 – 10 April 1863), known as Lord Marcus Hill until 1860, was a British Whig politician. Lea & Perrins has claimed that Sandys encountered a precursor to Worcestershire sauce while in India with the East India Company in the 1830s, and commissioned the local apothecaries to recreate it, eventually leading to its popularity in England.

== Background ==
Born Lord Marcus Hill, Sandys was a younger son of Arthur Hill, 2nd Marquess of Downshire, and Mary, 1st Baroness Sandys, daughter of Colonel the Hon. Martin Sandys. Arthur Hill, 3rd Marquess of Downshire, was his elder brother.

== Political career ==
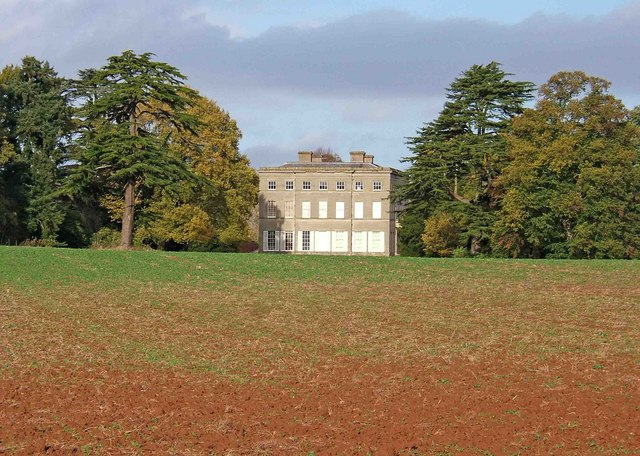
Ombersley Court, seat of the Barons Sandys

Sandys was Member of Parliament for Newry from 1832 to 1835 and for Evesham from 1838 to 1852. He served as Comptroller of the Household under Lord Melbourne in 1841 and under Lord John Russell between 1846 and 1847 and as Treasurer of the Household under Russell between 1847 and 1852. In 1860 he succeeded his elder brother as third Baron Sandys. The following year he assumed by royal licence the surname of Sandys in lieu of Hill.

== Family ==
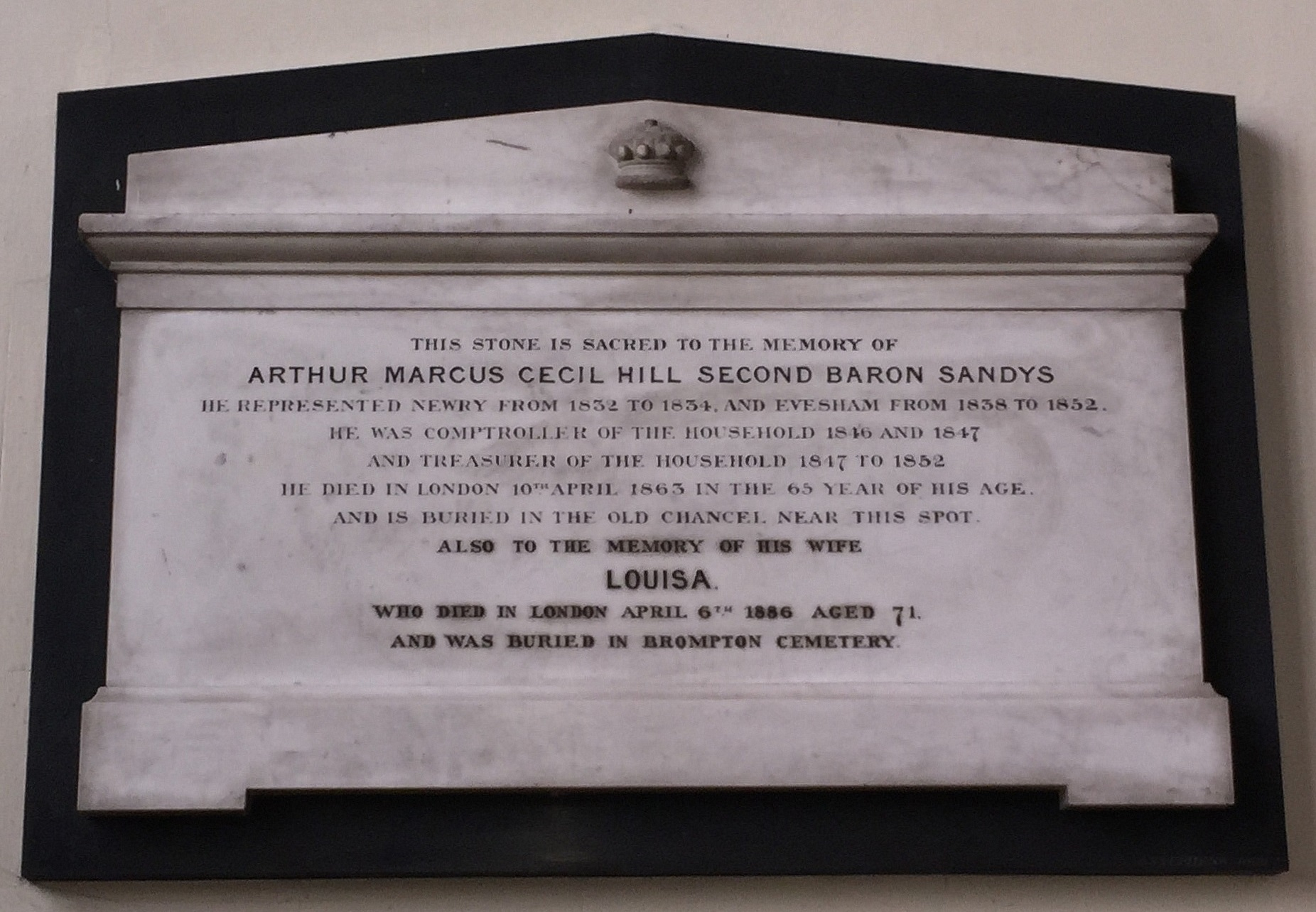
Saint Andrew's church, Ombersley: memorial on Arthur Marcus Cecil Sandys, Lord Sandys (1798–1863)

Lord Sandys married Louisa, daughter of Joseph Blake, in 1837. He died in April 1863, aged 65, and was succeeded by his eldest son, Augustus. Lady Sandys died in April 1886.

He was a godfather to Marcus Cheek, "the young martyr of Allahabad", who was given the forenames Arthur Marcus Hill in his honour.

== Arms ==
Coat of arms of Marcus Sandys, 3rd Baron Sandys

Crest
1st: a Griffin segreant per fess Or and Gules (Sandys); 2nd: a Reindeer's Head couped at the neck Gules attired and plain collared Or (Hill)
Escutcheon
Quarterly: 1st and 4th, Or a Fess dancetty between three Cross Crosslets fitchy Gules (Sandys); 2nd and 3rd, Sable on a Fess Argent between three Leopards passant guardant Or spotted of the field as many Escallops Gules (Hill)
Supporters
On either side a Griffin wings elevated per fess Or and Gules gorged with a Collar dancetty of the last
Motto
Probum Non Paenitet (The honest man has not to repent)

Parliament of the United Kingdom
Preceded by John Henry Knox	Member of Parliament for Newry; 1832–1835	Succeeded by Denis Caulfield Brady
Preceded by Peter Borthwick; George Rushout-Bowles	Member of Parliament for Evesham; 1838–1852; With: George Rushout-Bowles 1838–1841; Peter Borthwick 1841–1847; Sir Henry Willoughby, Bt 1847–1852	Succeeded by Sir Henry Willoughby, Bt; Grenville Berkeley
Political offices
Preceded by Hon. George Byng	Comptroller of the Household; 1841	Succeeded by Hon. George Dawson-Damer
Preceded by Hon. George Dawson-Damer	Comptroller of the Household; 1846–1847	Succeeded by Hon. William Lascelles
Preceded by Lord Robert Grosvenor	Treasurer of the Household; 1847–1852	Succeeded by Lord Claud Hamilton
Peerage of the United Kingdom
Preceded by Arthur Hill	Baron Sandys; 1860–1863	Succeeded by Augustus Sandys
