= Francis Needham, 4th Earl of Kilmorey =

Anglo-Irish peer and military officer (1883–1961)

Captain The Right Honourable The Earl of Kilmorey OBE PC (NI) ADC DL
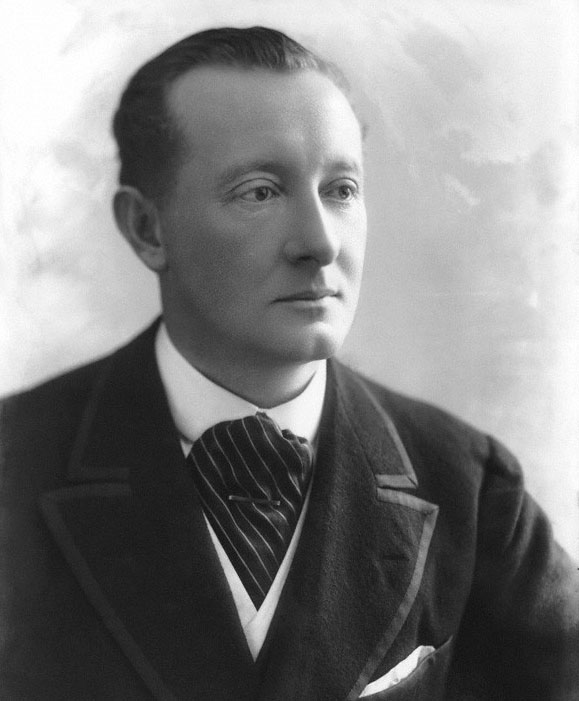
- Earl of Kilmorey in 1920

Personal details
- Born: Francis Charles Adelbert Henry Needham; 26 November 1883 Brentford, Middlesex, England
- Died: 11 January 1961 (aged 77) Mourne Park, County Down, Northern Ireland
- Citizenship: British
- Spouse: Lady Norah Frances Hastings
- Children: 2
- Parent(s): Francis Needham, 3rd Earl of Kilmorey; Ellen Constance Baldock
- Education: Eton College
- Alma mater: Royal Military Academy Sandhurst

Military service
- Allegiance: United Kingdom
- Branch/service: British Army; Royal Navy
- Years of service: 1901–1946
- Rank: Captain
- Unit: King's Shropshire Light Infantry; 1st Life Guards; Royal Naval Volunteer Reserve
- Battles/wars: First World War

Captain Francis Charles Adelbert Henry Needham, 4th Earl of Kilmorey, OBE, PC (NI), ADC, DL (26 November 1883 – 11 January 1961), styled Viscount Newry until 1915, was a Royal Navy officer and Anglo-Irish peer.

In 1916 he was appointed as an Irish representative peer, to sit in the House of Lords for life representing Ireland. No more such peers were appointed after the independence of the Irish Free State in 1922, and when Kilmorey died in 1961 he was the last such surviving peer.

== Background ==
Kilmorey was the eldest son of Francis Needham, 3rd Earl of Kilmorey, and Ellen Constance Baldock. He was educated at Eton College and the Royal Military College, Sandhurst. He was from a prominent Ulster family with roots in Cheshire.

== Military career ==
He was commissioned into the 3rd (Militia) Battalion, King's Shropshire Light Infantry in 1901, and in March 1902 transferred to the 1st Life Guards as a Second Lieutenant. He was promoted Lieutenant again in 1904 and Captain in 1907. He resigned his commission in 1911. He returned to the Army during the First World War, reaching the rank of Major. In 1930 he was appointed Captain in the Royal Naval Volunteer Reserve in which rank from 1930 to his retirement in 1946 he was commanding officer of the Ulster Division of the Royal Navy Volunteer Reserve based in HMS Caroline in Belfast Harbour (now a museum). He was appointed an Officer of the Military Division of the Order of the British Empire in the 1936 Birthday Honours.

== Political career ==
He also served as High Sheriff of County Down in 1913, as Lord Lieutenant of County Down from 1949 to 1959 and as Vice-Admiral of Ulster from 1937 to 1961. From 1916 until his death, Kilmorey sat in the House of Lords as an Irish representative peer, becoming the last surviving Irish representative Peer. In 1936 he was admitted to the Privy Council of Northern Ireland.

== Family ==
Lord Kilmorey married Lady Norah Frances Hastings, daughter of Warner Francis John Plantagenet Hastings, 15th Earl of Huntingdon, in 1920. They had two daughters. He died in January 1961, aged 77, at the family seat of Mourne Park. He was succeeded in his titles by his nephew Patrick.

The ancestral Mourne Park Estate, of some 800 acres (3.2 km^{2}), in County Down, Northern Ireland (including the lordships and manors of Newry, Mourne and Greencastle) was not, however, inherited by the 5th Earl who opted to inherit contents to the value of the estate as he lived in England. It is currently owned by the Anley family, descendants of the late Lady Eleanor Needham, elder daughter of the 4th Earl of Kilmorey.

Honorary titles
Preceded by The Marquess of Londonderry	Lord Lieutenant of County Down; 1949–1959	Succeeded by Sir Roland Nugent, Bt
Peerage of Ireland
Preceded by Francis Needham	Earl of Kilmorey; 1915–1961	Succeeded by Patrick Needham
Political offices
Preceded by The Lord Massy	Representative peer for Ireland; 1916–1961	Office lapsed
