= Arthur Charles Innes =

Irish Politician (1834–1902)

Arthur Charles Innes (1834–1902), was an Irish Conservative Party Member of the Parliament of the United Kingdom who represented the constituency of Newry from 1865 to 1868.

Parliament of the United Kingdom
Preceded by Peter Quinn	Member of Parliament for Newry; 1865 – 1868	Succeeded by William Kirk
