= William Kirk (MP) =

Irish businessperson and politician

- Born: 1795; Larne, Ireland
- Died: 20 December 1870 (aged 74–75)
- Monuments: Kirk Memorial, Keady
- Citizenship: United Kingdom
- Occupation: Member of Parliament for Newry
- Years active: 1852-1859, 1868-1870
- Known for: Campaigner for tenant rights
- Political party: Independent Irish Party, Liberal Party

William Kirk (1795 – 20 December 1870) was an Irish linen-mill entrepreneur and Member of the Parliament of the United Kingdom. He was elected, with the endorsement of the Tenant Right League, as an independent for constituency of Newry in 1852, and again in 1857. He stood down as a candidate for re-election in 1859. In 1865 he entered the arena as a Liberal candidate for Armagh, but he failed to win the seat. His final appearance on the political stage was in 1868, when, returning to Newry as a Liberal, he successfully contested his old seat. Despite failing health, he continued to attend parliament, and maintained his support for tenant rights and for "mixed" (Catholic, Protestant) education.

== Linen entrepreneur and progressive employer ==
William was born to Mr. Hugh Kirk and the former Miss Eliza Miller in Larne, in 1795, and followed his father into business: the manufacture of linen. In 1820 he married Ann McKean, of Darkley House, whose father, James, was also in the trade.

Presiding over the transition from farmhouse to factory production, Kirk introduced water-powered looms. In 1837 he bought the Annvale finishing mill in 1837 in Keady, south Armagh, and expanded it to include weaving as well as bleaching and dyeing. In 1845, after the death of his brother-in-law Henry McKean, he assumed control of a spinning mill at Darkley. The Darkley works eventually expanded to cover 137 acres, boasting 200 power looms, and 8,000 spindles, manned by 700 persons. The mill was operated by the second largest, if not the largest, water wheel in Europe. Kirk was very interested in the technical side of the industry, and by 1848 had designed and installed the first water turbine in one of his own beetling mills near Keady. It was this innovative approach that ensured success for the Annvale-Darkley operation. His business holdings would eventually expand to include an imposing warehouse in the centre of Belfast, and branches or agencies in London, Manchester, New York and Paris.

The workers' houses that still shape the profile of Darkley village were constructed with the assistance of a government grant secured by Kirk. He also established a shop, a dairy, and a small farm. In 1857 he added a school, and later a reading room with evening classes for adults. Kirk was deeply involved in the Presbyterian Church: he helped found the Presbyterian Orphan Society, and was a trustee of the General Assembly's College in Belfast. He was also an important figure in local government, serving as a Justice of the Peace, a member of the County Armagh Grand Jury and Deputy-Lieutenant of the county.

== Member of Parliament ==
Encouraged by his friends, in 1852 he stood as a parliamentary candidate in nearby Newry. In his local Armagh constituency Conservative landlords and their Orange Order allies were too strong a force. He refused to align himself with any party, saying he would "join no party which will not be a party to serve the people", and declaring himself ready to "support the government or the opposition, or an independent member who will propose and strive to carry out measures to benefit this neglected country". It was not until 1865 that he declared his support for the Liberals.

In the House of Commons, Kirk was declare that "as a merchant and a free-trader, he should be ashamed of himself to argue for a compulsory valuation of rents". He argued, however, that the tenant right, or "custom", of Ulster should be given the force of law. Where the landlord and tenant could not between themselves agree upon the price of the land, "permission should be given to the tenant to resign his holding to the landlord, and get from him the value of the improvements he had made upon it". "This", he proposed, "would completely destroy all cause of agrarian crime". Together with his pleas for religious toleration, Kirk's championing of tenant right gave him credibility with both Catholics and Presbyterians. Together with the fact that much of his business was carried on via the port of Newry, it enabled him carry the seat in 1852 and again in 1857.

In parliament, in addition to tenant right and religious equality, Kirk committed himself to free trade, the secret ballot (which would give tenants and employees greater political independence from their landlords and masters) and non-denominational education. Locally, he outlined a scheme to introduce cotton manufacture to Newry, arguing that Ulster was importing a fabric which it had the skills to make, promoted initiatives to create jobs for women and was instrumental in getting the railway system from Newry extended and the harbour improved.

In the campaign of 1859, discouraged by the deep-seated opposition from his conservative co-religionists, he withdrew his candidacy for re-election. There were reports of Conservative landlords serving notice to quit on his tenant supporters.

In 1865 he unsuccessfully challenged his conservative opponents in Armagh while his son William Millar Kirk contested, but failed to carry, the Newry seat. Kirk was returned to Parliament as a Liberal from Newry in 1868 due, almost entirely, to the Catholic vote. In his nomination speech Kirk had focussed on his support for the disestablishment of the [Anglican] Church of Ireland and reasserted his commitment to religious equality. "I am now, as I ever have been", he declared, "the advocate of Civil and Religious Liberty. What I claim for myself I concede to others, as I cannot but feel that if my neighbour’s liberty is infringed, my own is in danger". He defeated the Conservative candidate, Francis Needham, Viscount Newry and Mourne, by just seven votes.

== Death and family ==
In the January 1871 by-election that followed Kirk's death in December 1870, Lord Newry was returned unopposed. Later that same year a large memorial to Kirk was erected in the centre of Keady.

His son Thomas Sinclair Kirk (1869–1940) was a prominent Belfast surgeon, President of the Ulster Medical Society 1908–09, and during the First World War a noted pioneer in the use of urea for sterilising wounds.

Parliament of the United Kingdom
Preceded by Edmund Gilling Hallewell	Member of Parliament for Newry; 1852 – 1859	Succeeded by Peter Quinn
Preceded by Arthur Charles Innes	Member of Parliament for Newry; 1868 – 1870	Succeeded by Viscount Newry
