= Newry (UK Parliament constituency) =

UK parliamentary constituency in Ireland, 1801–1918

- Former borough constituency for the House of Commons
- County: County Down
- Borough: Newry

1801–1918
- Seats: 1
- Created from: Newry (IHC)
- Replaced by: South Down

Newry was a United Kingdom Parliament constituency in Ireland returning one MP from 1801 to 1918.

== History and boundaries ==
It was an original constituency represented in Parliament when the Union of the Kingdom of Great Britain and the Kingdom of Ireland took effect on 1 January 1801.

This constituency was the parliamentary borough of Newry in County Down. The boundary commissioners indicated in their report of November 1831 that as the limits of the borough were essentially connected with the elective franchise, they were not authorised to propose a curtailment in them. It was defined by the Parliamentary Boundaries (Ireland) Act 1832 as "The present Borough of Newry".

The 1917 Boundary Commission recommended the abolition of the constituency, to become part of South Down. This was implemented under the Redistribution of Seats (Ireland) Act 1918

== Members of Parliament ==
Election	Member	Party	Note
1801, January 1	John Moore		1801: Co-opted
1802, July 13	Rt Hon. Isaac Corry	Whig	
1806, November 15	Hon. Francis Needham (1)	Tory	Became the 12th Viscount Kilmorey 1818
1819, March 6	Hon. Francis Needham (2)	Tory	Styled Viscount Newry 12 January 1822
1826, June 14	Hon. John Henry Knox	Tory	
1832, December 27	Lord Marcus Hill	Tory	
1834, December 18	Lord Marcus Hill	Conservative	
1835, January 21	Denis Caulfield Brady	Whig	
1837, August 4	John Ellis	Conservative	
1841, July 8	Francis Needham (3)	Conservative	Re-elected as a Peelite candidate
1847, August 2	Francis Needham (3)	Peelite	Died 6 May 1851
1851, May 30	Edmund Gilling Hallewell	Conservative	
1852, July 19	William Kirk	Whig	
1859, May 5	Peter Quinn	Conservative	
1865, July 15	Arthur Charles Innes	Conservative	
1868, November 18	William Kirk	Liberal	Died 20 December 1870
1871, January 23	Francis Needham (4)	Conservative	
1874, February 3	William Whitworth	Liberal	
1880, April 3	Henry Thomson	Conservative	
1885, November 24	Justin Huntly McCarthy	Irish Parliamentary	
1892, July 7	Patrick Carvill	Irish National Federation	Re-elected as an Irish Parliamentary Party candidate
1900, October 1	Patrick Carvill	Irish Parliamentary	
1906, January 17	John Mooney	Irish Parliamentary	Last MP for the constituency
1918	Constituency abolished		

== Elections ==
=== Elections in the 1830s ===
General election 1830: Newry
Party	Candidate	Votes	%
Tory	John Henry Knox	Unopposed	
Registered electors		c. 600	
Tory hold			

General election 1831: Newry
Party	Candidate	Votes	%
Tory	John Henry Knox	333	60.1
Whig	Denis Maguire	221	39.9
Majority		112	20.2
Turnout		554	c. 92.3
Registered electors		c. 600	
Tory hold			

General election 1832: Newry
Party	Candidate	Votes	%	±%
Tory	Marcus Hill	494	51.0	−9.1
Whig	Denis Maguire	475	49.0	+9.1
Majority		19	2.0	−18.2
Turnout		969	95.3	c. +3.0
Registered electors		1,017		
Tory hold		Swing	−9.1	

General election 1835: Newry
Party	Candidate	Votes	%	±%
Whig	Denis Caulfield Brady	402	51.8	+2.8
Conservative	Sir Thomas Staples, 9th Baronet	374	48.2	−2.8
Majority		28	3.6	N/A
Turnout		776	68.4	−26.9
Registered electors		1,134		
Whig gain from Conservative		Swing	+2.8	

General election 1837: Newry
Party	Candidate	Votes	%	±%
Conservative	John Ellis	338	52.6	+4.4
Whig	Denis Caulfield Brady	305	47.4	−4.4
Majority		33	5.2	N/A
Turnout		643	44.7	−23.7
Registered electors		1,439		
Conservative gain from Whig		Swing	+4.4	

=== Elections in the 1840s ===
General election 1841: Newry
Party	Candidate	Votes	%	±%
Irish Conservative	Francis Needham	319	57.3	+4.7
Whig	John Milley Doyle	237	42.5	−4.9
Whig	Peter Kenny	1	0.2	N/A
Majority		82	14.8	+9.6
Turnout		557	89.4	+44.7
Registered electors		623		
Conservative hold		Swing	+4.8	

General election 1847: Newry
Party	Candidate	Votes	%	±%
Peelite	Francis Needham	Unopposed		
Registered electors		1,135		
Peelite gain from Conservative				

=== Elections in the 1850s ===
Needham's death caused a by-election.

By-election, 30 May 1851: Newry
Party	Candidate	Votes	%	±%
Irish Conservative	Edmund Gilling Hallewell	Unopposed		
Irish Conservative gain from Peelite				

General election 1852: Newry
Party	Candidate	Votes	%	±%
Whig	William Kirk	233	53.3	N/A
Irish Conservative	Edmund Gilling Hallewell	204	46.7	N/A
Majority		29	6.6	N/A
Turnout		437	84.5	N/A
Registered electors		517		
Whig gain from Peelite		Swing	N/A	

General election 1857: Newry
Party	Candidate	Votes	%	±%
Whig	William Kirk	246	51.5	−1.8
Irish Conservative	Henry Waring	232	48.5	+1.8
Majority		14	3.0	−3.6
Turnout		478	90.7	+6.2
Registered electors		527		
Whig hold		Swing	−1.8	

General election 1859: Newry
Party	Candidate	Votes	%	±%
Irish Conservative	Peter Quinn	250	55.7	+7.2
Liberal	Frederick William McBlain	197	43.9	N/A
Liberal	William Kirk	2	0.4	−51.1
Majority		53	11.8	N/A
Turnout		449	84.9	−5.8
Registered electors		529		
Conservative gain from Liberal		Swing	+29.2	

=== Elections in the 1860s ===
General election 1865: Newry
Party	Candidate	Votes	%	±%
Irish Conservative	Arthur Charles Innes	267	53.2	−2.5
Liberal	William Miller Kirk	235	46.8	+2.9
Majority		32	6.4	−5.4
Turnout		502	93.1	+8.2
Registered electors		539		
Irish Conservative hold		Swing	−2.7	

General election 1868: Newry
Party	Candidate	Votes	%	±%
Liberal	William Kirk	387	50.5	+3.7
Irish Conservative	Francis Needham	379	49.5	−3.7
Majority		8	1.0	N/A
Turnout		766	96.2	+3.1
Registered electors		796		
Liberal gain from Irish Conservative		Swing	+3.7	

=== Elections in the 1870s ===
Kirk's death caused a by-election.

By-election, 23 Jan 1871: Newry
Party	Candidate	Votes	%	±%
Irish Conservative	Francis Needham	Unopposed		
Registered electors		901		
Irish Conservative gain from Liberal				

General election 1874: Newry
Party	Candidate	Votes	%	±%
Liberal	William Whitworth	459	50.2	−0.3
Irish Conservative	Francis Needham	455	49.8	+0.3
Majority		4	0.4	−0.6
Turnout		914	92.3	−3.9
Registered electors		990		
Liberal hold		Swing	−0.3	

=== Elections in the 1880s ===
General election 1880: Newry
Party	Candidate	Votes	%	±%
Irish Conservative	Henry Thomson	587	51.3	+1.5
Liberal	Patrick Carvill	557	48.7	−1.5
Majority		30	2.6	N/A
Turnout		1,144	95.3	+3.0
Registered electors		1,201		
Irish Conservative gain from Liberal		Swing	+1.5	

1885 general election: Newry
Party	Candidate	Votes	%	±%
Irish Parliamentary	Justin Huntly McCarthy	Unopposed		
Registered electors		2,163		
Irish Parliamentary gain from Irish Conservative				

1886 general election: Newry
Party	Candidate	Votes	%	±%
Irish Parliamentary	Justin Huntly McCarthy	1,183	62.3	N/A
Liberal Unionist	Reginald Cantley Saunders	716	37.7	New
Majority		467	24.6	N/A
Turnout		1,899	87.8	N/A
Registered electors		2,163		
Irish Parliamentary hold		Swing	N/A	

=== Elections in the 1890s ===
1892 general election: Newry
Party	Candidate	Votes	%	±%
Irish National Federation	Patrick Carvill	907	53.2	N/A
Irish Unionist	Henry Thomson	744	43.6	+5.9
Irish National League	Robert Johnston	54	3.2	N/A
Majority		163	9.6	N/A
Turnout		1,705	92.3	+4.5
Registered electors		1,847		
Irish National Federation gain from Irish Parliamentary		Swing	N/A	

1895 general election: Newry
Party	Candidate	Votes	%	±%
Irish National Federation	Patrick Carvill	973	60.8	+7.6
Irish Unionist	Henry Thomson	628	39.2	−4.4
Majority		345	21.6	+12.0
Turnout		1,601	85.5	−6.8
Registered electors		1,872		
Irish National Federation hold		Swing	+6.0	

=== Elections in the 1900s ===
1900 general election: Newry
Party	Candidate	Votes	%	±%
Irish Parliamentary	Patrick Carvill	Unopposed		
Registered electors		1,789		
Irish Parliamentary hold				

1906 general election: Newry
Party	Candidate	Votes	%	±%
Irish Parliamentary	John Mooney	802	52.1	N/A
Ind. Nationalist	Patrick Carvill	736	47.9	N/A
Majority		66	4.2	N/A
Turnout		1,538	80.7	N/A
Registered electors		1,905		
Irish Parliamentary hold		Swing	N/A	

=== Elections in the 1910s ===
January 1910 general election: Newry
Party	Candidate	Votes	%	±%
Irish Parliamentary	John Mooney	1,079	66.6	+14.5
Irish Unionist	John Cusack	542	33.4	New
Majority		537	33.2	+29.0
Turnout		1,621	80.2	−0.5
Registered electors		2,021		
Irish Parliamentary hold		Swing	N/A	

December 1910 general election: Newry
Party	Candidate	Votes	%	±%
Irish Parliamentary	John Mooney	Unopposed		
Registered electors		2,021		
Irish Parliamentary hold				
