= John Henry Knox =

John Henry Knox (26 July 1788 – 27 August 1872) was an Ulster-Scots politician who was a Tory Member of the Parliament of the United Kingdom. He represented the constituency of Newry from 1826 to 1832.

Parliament of the United Kingdom
Preceded by Francis Jack Needham	Member of Parliament for Newry; 1826 – 1832	Succeeded by Lord Marcus Hill
