= Francis Needham, 1st Earl of Kilmorey =

Anglo-Irish soldier and Member of Parliament

General The Right Honourable The Earl of Kilmorey
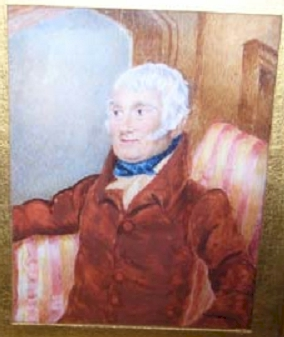

Member of Parliament for Newry
- In office 1806–1818
- Preceded by: Isaac Corry
- Succeeded by: Francis Needham

Personal details
- Born: Francis Needham; 5 April 1748
- Died: 21 November 1832 (aged 84)
- Spouse: Anne Fisher (m. 1787; died 1816)
- Children: 10
- Parent(s): John Needham, 10th Viscount Kilmorey; Anne Hurleston

General Francis Needham, 1st Earl of Kilmorey (5 April 1748 – 21 November 1832), known as Francis Needham until 1818 and as The Viscount Kilmorey from 1818 to 1822, was an Anglo-Irish soldier and Member of Parliament.

== Early life ==
Kilmorey was the third son of John Needham, 10th Viscount Kilmorey, and Anne (née Hurleston), daughter and co-heiress of John Hurleston, of Newton. His father had inherited his title from his brother, Thomas Needham, 9th Viscount Kilmorey, both sons of Robert Needham, 8th Viscount Kilmorey.

== Career ==
He entered the British Army in 1762 and served in the American War of Independence, where he was taken prisoner at the Siege of Yorktown in 1781. He also fought in the French Revolutionary Wars but is best remembered for his role during the Irish Rebellion of 1798. He was in overall command at the Battle of Arklow and commanded one of the five columns at the Battle of Vinegar Hill. In 1804, he was appointed Colonel of the 5th Royal Veteran Battalion. He was promoted to colonel for life of the 86th Foot in 1810 and to general in 1812.

From 1806 to 1818, Kilmorey also represented Newry in the House of Commons. He succeeded his elder brother in the viscountcy in 1818, but as this was an Irish peerage, it did not entitle him to a seat in the House of Lords. In 1822, he was honoured when he was made Viscount Newry and Mourne, in the County of Down, and Earl of Kilmorey. Both titles were in the Peerage of Ireland.

== Personal life ==
In 1787, Lord Kilmorey married Anne Fisher, a daughter of Thomas Fisher. They had two sons and eight daughters:

- Francis Needham, 2nd Earl of Kilmorey (1787–1880), who married Jane Gun-Cuninghame in 1814. They separated in 1835 and, after her death in 1867, he married Martha Foster, in 1867.
- Lady Frances Margaretta Anne Needham (1789–1789), who died young.
- Lady Anna Maria Elizabeth Needham (1790–1866), who married the Canon of Windsor, the Rev. Hon. Henry Cockayne Cust, second son of Brownlow Cust, 1st Baron Brownlow, in 1816.
- Lady Amelia Needham (1791–1860), who died unmarried.
- Lady Frances Elizabeth Needham (1792–1890), who married Gen. George Powell Higginson in 1825; they were the parents of General Sir George Higginson.
- Lady Selina Needham (1794–1876), who married Hon. Orlando Henry Bridgeman, a son of Orlando Bridgeman, 1st Earl of Bradford, in 1817.
- Lady Georgiana Needham (1795–1888), who died unmarried.
- Lady Alicia Mary Needham (1796–1885), who married Samuel Ellis Bristowe, of Beesthorpe, in 1836.
- Hon. Francis Henry William Needham (1799–1868), a Lt. Col. in the British Army.
- Lady Mabella Josephine Needham (1801–1899), who married Hon. John Henry Knox, third son of Thomas Knox, 1st Earl of Ranfurly and Hon. Diana Jane Pery (daughter and co-heiress of Edmund Pery, 1st Viscount Pery), in 1822.

He died in November 1832, aged 84, and was succeeded in his titles by his eldest son Francis.

Military offices
Preceded by Sir Charles Ross, Bt.	Colonel of the 86th (The Leinster) Regiment of Foot); 1810–1832	Succeeded by William Harris, 2nd Baron Harris
Parliament of the United Kingdom
Preceded by Isaac Corry	Member of Parliament for Newry; 1806 – 1818	Succeeded by Francis Needham
Peerage of Ireland
New creation	Earl of Kilmorey; 1822 – 1832	Succeeded by Francis Needham
Preceded by Robert Needham	Viscount Kilmorey; 1818 – 1832	Succeeded by Francis Needham
