= Francis Needham, 2nd Earl of Kilmorey =

Anglo-Irish peer and Member of Parliament

The Right Honourable The Earl of Kilmorey
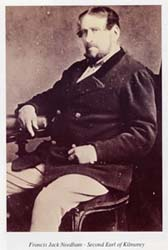

Member of Parliament for Newry
- In office 1819–1826
- Preceded by: Lord Kilmorey
- Succeeded by: John Henry Knox

Personal details
- Born: 12 December 1787
- Died: June 20, 1880 (aged 92)
- Resting place: Kilmorey Mausoleum
- Spouse(s): Jane Gun-Cuninghame (m. 1814–1835) Martha Foster (m. 1867)
- Relations: Violet Needham (granddaughter)

Military service
- Allegiance: United Kingdom
- Branch/service: British Army
- Years of service: 1803–1812
- Rank: Captain
- Unit: 1st Foot Guards
- Battles/wars: Napoleonic Wars; Peninsular War; Battle of Corunna

Francis Jack Needham, 2nd Earl of Kilmorey (12 December 1787 – 20 June 1880), known as Viscount Newry from 1822 to 1832, was an Anglo-Irish peer and Member of Parliament.

== Biography ==
He was the son of General Francis Needham, 1st Earl of Kilmorey. He was elected to the House of Commons for Newry in 1819 (succeeding his father), a seat he held until 1826. In 1832 he succeeded his father in the earldom but as this was an Irish peerage it did not entitle him to a seat in the House of Lords. He served as High Sheriff of Down for 1828.

He married Jane Gun-Cuninghame in 1814, they separated in 1835 and she died in 1867. He married his second wife, Martha Foster (1838-1908), on the 20 November 1867. No issue.

Lord Kilmorey scandalised Victorian society by eloping with his ward, Priscilla Anne Hoste (26 June 1823 – 21 October 1854), when he was in his late fifties and she was 20. Priscilla Hoste was the daughter of Admiral Sir William Hoste and his wife Lady Harriet Walpole. Her father died when she was a small child and her mother allegedly was careless of her relations with Lord Kilmorey.

A year after their elopement, in July 1844, they had a child, Charles, who Lord Kilmorey acknowledged as his son and to whom he gave his surname. (Note: Charles was born on 20 July 1844 in Twickenham and died 25 February 1934 in Tylehurst, Sussex. See Nederland's Adelboek (1939) for birth date.) He set up his mistress in an adjoining house with a tunnel between the two.

== Kilmorey Mausoleum ==
Priscilla died of heart disease on 21 October 1854, and she was buried in a mausoleum which had been specially commissioned by Lord Kilmorey for them both, with the inscription "Priscilla, the beloved of Francis Jack, Earl of Kilmorey".

When Kilmorey himself died in June 1880, aged 92, he was buried beside her in the mausoleum underneath a bas-relief showing the dying Priscilla on a couch surrounded by her lover and ten-year-old son. The Kilmorey Mausoleum, in an ancient Egyptian design, is now a Grade II* listed monument. It cost £30,000 to build and was moved several times between Lord Kilmorey's homes. It is in St Margarets (the subdistrict named after the house and grounds the Earl bought) in Twickenham and is maintained jointly by Richmond upon Thames Council and English Heritage.

== Legacy ==
Kilmorey was succeeded in his titles by his grandson Francis, his eldest son Francis Needham, Viscount Newry, having predeceased him.

Charles Needham, despite being illegitimate, was said to be his father's favourite – the "apple of his eye". He was two years younger than his half-nephew, the eventual 3rd Earl of Kilmorey. On 25 February 1874 he married in London a Dutch heiress called Henriette Amélie Charlotte Vincentia barones van Tuyll van Serooskerken (known as Amy), the third daughter of Vincent Gildemeester baron van Tuyll van Serooskerken, who had made a fortune out of the tin concessions on the island of Billiton in the Dutch East Indies. (Note: Dates and spelling of names according to Nederland's Adelsboek, jrg. 37 (1939: 348–349). Amy van Tuyll van Seerooskerken was born on 14 November 1853 in Baden-Baden and died on 27 April 1936 in Tylehurst, Sussex.) Charles and Amy had two daughters, Evelyn and Violet.

Violet Needham (1876–1967) was the author of 19 books for children published between 1939 and 1957. Although she came to writing late – she was 63 when her first book, The Black Riders, was published – her books achieved immediate and lasting popularity with young readers.

== See also ==
- Cross Deep House
- Kilmorey Mausoleum
- Radnor House

== Bibliography ==
- Kidd, Charles; Williamson, David (editors). Debrett's Peerage and Baronetage (1990 edition). New York: St Martin's Press
- Leigh Rayment's Historical List of MPs

Parliament of the United Kingdom
Preceded by Francis Needham	Member of Parliament for Newry; 1819–1826	Succeeded by John Henry Knox
Peerage of Ireland
Preceded by Francis Needham	Earl of Kilmorey; 1832–1880	Succeeded by Francis Charles Needham
