= Francis Needham, Viscount Newry =

Anglo-Irish Member of Parliament

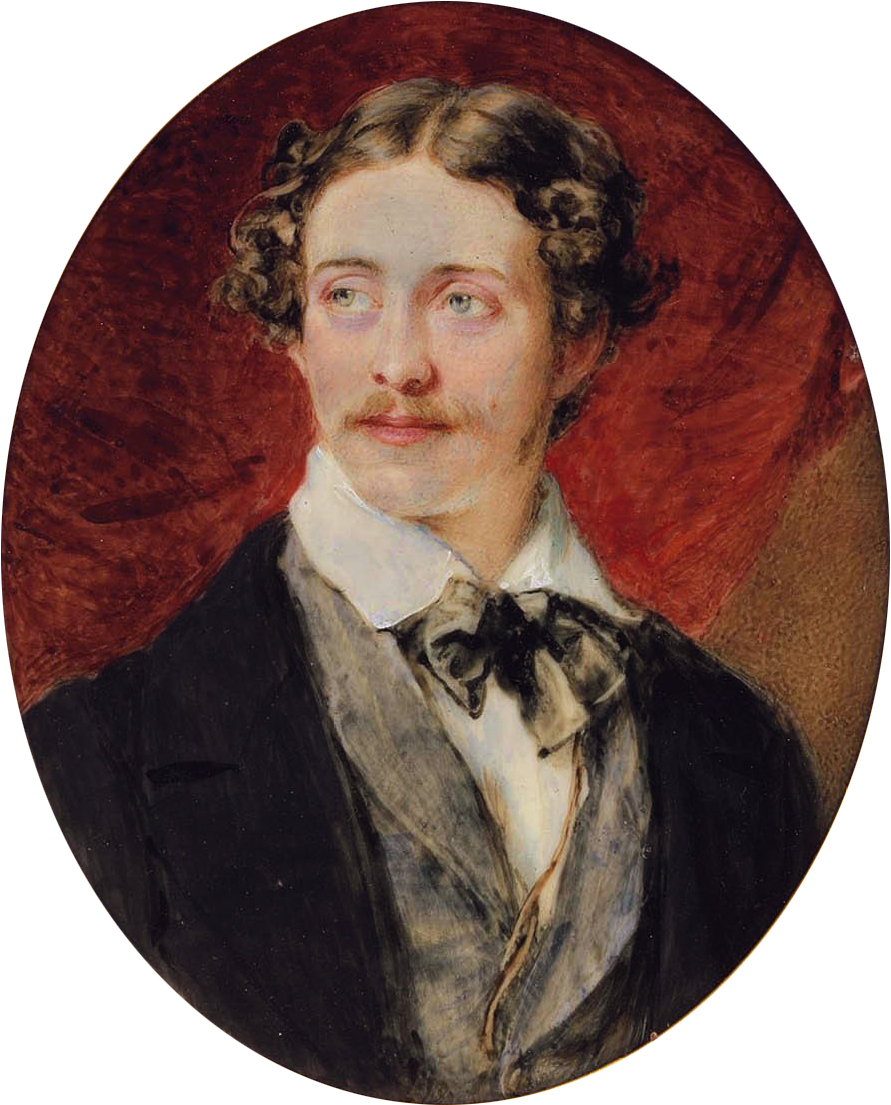
Francis Jack Needham, Viscount Newry (1815–1851) (William Charles Ross, 1842)

Francis Jack Needham, Viscount Newry (2 February 1815 – 6 May 1851), was an Anglo-Irish Member of Parliament.

Newry, who was born in Boulogne, France, and baptised at Sidmouth, Devon, was the eldest son of Francis Needham, 2nd Earl of Kilmorey, and Jane Gun-Cuninghame, and was educated at Eton College. He gained the courtesy title of Viscount Newry when his father succeeded as Earl of Kilmorey in 1832. In 1841 he was elected as a Conservative to the House of Commons for Newry in 1841, a seat he held until his death.

Lord Newry married, at Watford, Hertfordshire, in 1839 Anne Amelia Colville, daughter of General the Hon. Sir Charles Colville. He died at his home in Grosvenor Crescent, Belgravia, London, in May 1851, aged 36, predeceasing his father, and was buried at Adderley, Shropshire. His eldest son Francis succeeded to the earldom in 1880. Lady Newry died 6 January 1900, aged 80.

== Notes ==
Parliament of the United Kingdom
Preceded by John Ellis	Member of Parliament for Newry; 1841 – 1851	Succeeded by Edmund Gilling Hallewell
