= List of United Kingdom MPs with the shortest service =

List of MPs

This is an annotated list of the members of the United Kingdom Parliament since 1900 having total service of less than 365 days.

Nominal service is the number of days that elapsed between the declaration (or deemed election) and the date of death, defeat, disqualification, resignation or other cause of termination.

Effective service is the number of days elapsed between taking the oath as a member of Parliament (if the member did so) and the date of death, resignation, disqualification or dissolution of Parliament. In other words, this number is the maximum number of days the member could have sat in Parliament, whether or not they actually did so.

This list includes Irish Republican MPs who were elected but did not serve in the House of Commons due to their abstentionist policy.

== List ==
| Member | Party | Constituency | Election date | Nominal service (days) | Took the Oath | Maiden speech | Effective service (days) | Notes |
|---|---|---|---|---|---|---|---|---|
| Thomas Higgins | Irish Parliamentary | North Galway, 1906 | 25 January 1906 | 0 (Note: Higgins died hours before his declaration on 26 January 1906 and was declared elected posthumously.) | N | N | 0 | Died |
| Alfred Dobbs | Labour | Smethwick, 1945 | 26 July 1945 (Note: Polling took place on 5 July 1945, but results were not declared until 26 July.) | 1 | N | N | 0 | Died |
| James Annand | Liberal | East Aberdeenshire, 1906 | 24 January 1906 | 16 | N | N | 0 | Died |
| Bobby Sands | Anti H-Block | April 1981 Fermanagh and South Tyrone by-election | 9 April 1981 | 25 | N | N | 0 | Died |
| Harry Wrightson | Conservative | Leyton West, 1918 | 28 December 1918 (Note: Polling took place on 14 December 1918, but results were not declared until 28 December.) | 32 | N | N | 0 | Died |
| Joseph Nicholas Bell | Labour | Newcastle East, 1922 | 15 November 1922 | 32 | N | N | 0 | Died |
| Henry Francis Compton | Conservative | 1905 New Forest by-election | 6 December 1905 | 46 | N | N | 0 | Defeated at next general election |
| Hugh Anderson | Irish Unionist | North Londonderry, 1918 | 28 December 1918 | 47 | 10 February 1919 | N (Note: Anderson took his seat, but never spoke, asked a question, or voted.) | 3 | Resigned |
| Michael Carr | Labour | May 1990 Bootle by-election | 24 May 1990 | 57 | 5 June 1990 | 14 June 1990 | 45 | Died |
| Alexander Theodore Gordon | Conservative | Aberdeen and Kincardine Central, 1918 | 28 December 1918 | 68 | 5 February 1919 | N (Note: Gordon never spoke, asked a question, or voted. In March 1919 he was appointed to the Scottish Standing Committee, but died two days later.) | 29 | Died |
| Pierce McCan | Sinn Féin | East Tipperary, 1918 | 28 December 1918 | 68 | N | N | 0 | Died (Note: McCan was in prison at the time of his death but as an abstentionist would not have taken his seat, had he been free to do so.) |
| Donald Bennett | Liberal | 1945 Middlesbrough West by-election | 14 May 1945 | 73 | 15 May 1945 | N | 31 | Defeated at next general election |
| Oswald O'Brien | Labour | 1983 Darlington by-election | 24 March 1983 | 77 | 29 March 1983 | 14 April 1983 | 45 | Defeated at next general election |
| John Dumphreys | Conservative | 1909 Bermondsey by-election | 28 October 1909 | 83 | 1 November 1909 | N (Note: Dumphreys never spoke or asked a written question, but he voted in 19 divisions.) | 70 | Defeated at next general election |
| Charles James Mathew | Labour | Whitechapel and St. George's, 1922 | 15 November 1922 | 85 | 21 November 1922 | N (Note: Mathew never made a formal maiden speech, although he made several interventions, notably on 28 November 1922, when he challenged the Prime Minister, Bonar Law, over Unemployment. He also voted in 18 divisions.) | 48 | Died |
| Seaborne Davies | Liberal | 1945 Caernarvon Boroughs by-election | 26 April 1945 | 91 | 1 May 1945 | 11 June 1945 | 45 | Defeated at next general election |
| Ruth Dalton | Labour | 1929 Bishop Auckland by-election | 7 February 1929 | 92 | 12 February 1929 | 13 March 1929 | 87 | Retired at next general election |
| Margo MacDonald (Note: MacDonald was a member of the Scottish Parliament from 1999 until her death in 2014.) | SNP | 1973 Glasgow Govan by-election | 8 November 1973 | 92 | 22 November 1973 | 11 December 1973 | 78 | Defeated at next general election |
| Joseph Ormond Andrews | Liberal | 1905 Barkston Ash by-election | 13 October 1905 | 97 | N | N | 0 | Defeated at next general election |
| Jane Dodds (Note: Dodds was elected to the Welsh Parliament in 2021.) | Liberal Democrats | 2019 Brecon and Radnorshire by-election | 1 August 2019 | 97 | 3 September 2019 | 4 September 2019 | 64 | Defeated at next general election |
| Robert McIntyre (Note: McIntyre holds the record for the most attempts by a former MP to return to the Commons.) | SNP | 1945 Motherwell by-election | 12 April 1945 | 104 | 17 April 1945 | 1 May 1945 | 59 | Defeated at next general election |
| George Knox Anderson | Conservative | 1918 Canterbury by-election | 9 August 1918 | 113 | 15 October 1918 | N (Note: Anderson never spoke or asked a question, but he voted in 12 divisions.) | 41 | Retired at next general election |
| Herbert Evans | Labour | 1931 Gateshead by-election | 8 June 1931 | 121 | 11 June 1931 | 14 September 1931 | 118 | Died |
| Sir Henry Wilson | Irish Unionist | February 1922 North Down by-election | 21 February 1922 | 121 | 23 February 1922 | 21 March 1922 | 119 | Assassinated |
| John William Sunderland | Labour | Preston, 1945 | 26 July 1945 | 121 | 2 August 1945 | 11 October 1945 | 114 | Died |
| Charles Beattie | Ulster Unionist | 1955 Mid Ulster by-election | 11 August 1955 | 123 | 25 October 1955 | N | 105 | Disqualified |
| George Henry Williamson | Conservative | Worcester, 1906 | 17 January 1906 | 128 | Y (Note: The precise date of Williamson's taking of the Oath is not recorded; it probably occurred on 14/15 February 1906. Williamson spoke once in Parliament, to ask that "The Question be now put", but was overruled by the Speaker. He voted in several divisions.) | N | 100 (approximately) | Unseated |
| Harold St. Maur | Liberal | Exeter, Dec 1910 | 3 December 1910 | 129 | Y (Note: The precise date of St. Maur's taking of the Oath is not recorded; it occurred in late February 1911.) | 22 February 1911 | 55 (approximately) | Unseated |
| John Edmondson Whittaker | Labour | Heywood and Radcliffe, 1945 | 26 July 1945 | 136 | 2 August 1945 | 16 October 1945 | 129 | Died (suicide) |
| Richard Mathias | Liberal | Cheltenham, Dec 1910 | 5 December 1910 | 144 | 1 February 1911 | N | 68 | Unseated |
| George Brown Hillman | Conservative | Wakefield, 1931 | 27 October 1931 | 144 | 4 November 1931 | N | 136 | Died |
| Evan Cotton | Liberal | 1918 Finsbury East by-election | 16 July 1918 | 151 | 17 July 1918 | 6 August 1918 | 131 | Defeated at next general election |
| Robert Chichester | Irish Unionist | 1921 South Londonderry by-election | 29 August 1921 | 152 | Y | | | Died |
| Philip Clarke | Sinn Féin | Fermanagh and South Tyrone, 1955 | 26 May 1955 | 152 | N | N | 0 | Unseated |
| Thomas Mitchell | Sinn Féin | Mid-Ulster, 1955 | 26 May 1955 | 152 | N | N | 0 | Disqualified |
| Lisa Forbes | Labour | 2019 Peterborough by-election | 6 June 2019 | 153 | 10 June 2019 | 9 September 2019 | 149 | Defeated at next general election |
| Nicol Stephen | Liberal Democrats | 1991 Kincardine and Deeside by-election | 7 November 1991 | 154 | 12 November 1991 | 26 November 1991 | 125 | Defeated at next general election |
| David Hardie | Labour | 1931 Rutherglen by-election | 21 May 1931 | 159 | 2 June 1931 | 25 June 1931 | 127 | Defeated at next general election |
| Eugene O'Sullivan | Ind. Nationalist | East Kerry, Jan 1910 | 22 January 1910 | 170 | Y (Note: The precise date of O'Sullivan's taking of the Oath is not recorded; it occurred in late February 1910.) | N | 140 (approximately) | Unseated |
| David MacDonald | Conservative | Bothwell, 1918 | 28 December 1918 | 176 | 5 February 1919 | 27 March 1919 | 137 | Died |
| Herbert Sparkes | Conservative | Tiverton, 1922 | 15 November 1922 | 188 | 21 November 1922 | 14 February 1923 | 182 | Died |
| Helen McElhone | Labour | 1982 Glasgow Queen's Park by-election | 2 December 1982 | 189 | 8 December 1982 | 17 January 1983 | 156 | Retired at next general election |
| Hilton Philipson | National Liberal | Berwick-on-Tweed, 1922 | 15 November 1922 | 197 | 21 November 1922 | N | 168 | Unseated |
| Armine Wodehouse | Liberal | Saffron Walden, 1900 | 15 October 1900 | 200 | 4 December 1900 | 27 March 1901 | 148 | Died |
| Oswald Cawley | Liberal | January 1918 Prestwich by-election | 31 January 1918 | 202 | 20 June 1918 | N (Note: Cawley took his seat, but never spoke, asked a question, or voted.) | 63 | Killed in action World War I |
| Francis Norie-Miller | Liberal National | 1935 Perth by-election | 16 April 1935 | 212 | 2 May 1935 | N | 176 | Retired at next general election |
| David Austick | Liberal | 1973 Ripon by-election | 26 July 1973 | 217 | 16 October 1973 | 6 November 1973 | 115 | Defeated at next general election |
| Moreton Frewen | Ind. Nationalist | Cork North-East, Dec 1910 | 8 December 1910 | 220 | Y (Note: The precise date of Frewen's taking of the Oath is not recorded; it probably occurred in late February 1911.) | 24 April 1911 | 160 (approximately) | Resigned |
| Barry McElduff | Sinn Féin | West Tyrone, 2017 | 8 June 2017 | 222 | N | N | 0 | Resigned (Note: McElduff was an abstentionist) |
| Harry West (Note: West was the only member of the March–October 1974 Parliament who did not serve in any other Parliament.) | Ulster Unionist | Fermanagh and South Tyrone, February 1974 | 28 February 1974 | 224 | 13 March 1974 | 14 March 1974 | 191 | Defeated at next general election |
| Arthur Wellesley Willey | Conservative | Leeds Central, 1922 | 15 November 1922 | 229 | 21 November 1922 | N | 223 | Died |
| Christopher Ward | Conservative | 1969 Swindon by-election | 30 October 1969 | 231 | 4 November 1969 | 15 December 1969 | 206 | Defeated at next general election |
| William Henry Somervell | Liberal | 1918 Keighley by-election | 26 April 1918 | 232 | 29 April 1918 | 27 June 1918 | 210 | Defeated at next general election |
| James Godfrey MacManaway | Ulster Unionist | Belfast West, 1950 | 23 February 1950 | 238 | 13 June 1950 | 19 October 1950 | 128 | Disqualified |
| Thomas Browne Wallace | Irish Unionist | 1921 West Down by-election | 23 June 1921 | 239 | Y | | | Resigned |
| Frederick William Gibbins | Liberal | 1910 Mid Glamorgan by-election | 31 March 1910 | 253 | 4 April 1910 | N | 238 | Retired at next general election |
| Charles Frederick Palmer | Independent | February 1920 The Wrekin by-election | 7 February 1920 | 261 | 23 February 1920 | 27 February 1920 | 245 | Died |
| Hugh Hayes | Ulster Unionist | 1922 West Down by-election | 17 February 1922 | 271 | 2 March 1922 | | 238 | Retired at next general election |
| Harry Harpham | Labour | Sheffield Brightside and Hillsborough, 2015 | 7 May 2015 | 273 | 20 May 2015 | 17 June 2015 | 260 | Died |
| Joseph Jackson Cleary | Labour | 1935 Liverpool Wavertree by-election | 6 February 1935 | 281 | 11 February 1935 | 14 February 1935 | 256 | Defeated at next general election |
| Sir William Beveridge | Liberal | 1944 Berwick-upon-Tweed by-election | 17 October 1944 | 282 | 19 October 1944 | 3 November 1944 | 239 | Defeated at next general election |
| W. P. Sidney, VC | Conservative | 1944 Chelsea by-election | 11 October 1944 | 288 | 17 October 1944 | 29 November 1944 | 241 | Succeeded to the peerage |
| Alfred Holland | Labour | Clay Cross, 1935 | 14 November 1935 | 290 | 27 November 1935 | 30 April 1936 | 277 | Died |
| Sir John Reith | National | February 1940 Southampton by-election | 1 February 1940 | 293 | 6 February 1940 | N | 258 | Elevated to the peerage |
| Parmjit Singh Gill | Liberal Democrats | 2004 Leicester South by-election | 15 July 2004 | 294 | 20 July 2004 | 23 November 2004 | 261 | Defeated at next general election |
| Sir William Pain | Ulster Unionist | 1922 South Londonderry by-election | 18 January 1922 | 301 | 8 February 1922 | 10 May 1922 | 260 | Retired at next general election |
| W. E. Gibbons | Conservative | 1944 Bilston by-election | 20 September 1944 | 309 | 26 September 1944 | 6 December 1944 | 262 | Defeated at next general election |
| David Colville Anderson | Conservative | 1963 Dumfriesshire by-election | 12 December 1963 | 309 | 17 December 1963 | 8 February 1964 | 283 | Retired at next general election |
| 22 MPs who only sat in the February–November 1910 Parliament | various | various | various between 14 January and 9 February 1910 | various | various | various | 286 | |
| Judith Chaplin | Conservative | Newbury, 1992 | 9 April 1992 | 316 | 29 April 1992 | 10 June 1992 | 296 | Died |
| 64 MPs who only sat in the January–October 1924 Parliament | various | various | 6 December 1923 | 328 | various | various | 275 | |
| Thomas Teevan | Ulster Unionist | 1950 Belfast West by-election | 29 November 1950 | 330 | 5 December 1950 | 11 April 1951 | 304 | Defeated at next general election |
| William Nathaniel Jones | Liberal | 1928 Carmarthen by-election | 28 June 1928 | 336 | 3 July 1928 | N? | 311 | Defeated at next general election |
| Arthur Henniker-Hughan | Conservative | Galloway, 1924 | 29 October 1924 | 340 | 3 December 1924 | 19 March 1925 | 305 | Died |
| Martin Morris | Irish Unionist | Galway Borough, 1900 | 1 October 1900 | 342 | 4 December 1900 | 22 April 1901 | 278 | Succeeded to the peerage |
| Steve Tuckwell | Conservative | 2023 Uxbridge and South Ruislip by-election | 20 July 2023 | 351 | 5 September 2023 | 13 November 2023 | 268 | Defeated at next general election |
| Peter Law | Independent | Blaenau Gwent, 2005 | 5 May 2005 | 355 | 16 May 2005 | 16 June 2005 | 344 | Died |
| Wallace Lawler | Liberal | 1969 Birmingham Ladywood by-election | 26 June 1969 | 357 | 3 July 1969 | 23 July 1969 | 330 | Defeated at next general election |
| George Machin | Labour | 1973 Dundee East by-election | 1 March 1973 | 364 | 6 March 1973 | 8 March 1973 | 339 | Defeated at next general election |
| 51 MPs who only sat in the November 1922 – November 1923 Parliament | various | various | 15 November 1922 | 386 | various | various | 361 | |

== See also ==
- Records of members of parliament of the United Kingdom
- United Kingdom general election records
- United Kingdom by-election records
- List of stewards of the Manor of Northstead
- List of UK parliamentary election petitions
- List of Welsh AMs/MSs with the shortest service
- List of United States representatives who served a single term
