= Hugh Hayes =

Hugh Hayes (died 5 September 1928) was a unionist politician in Ireland.

Hayes lived in Lurgan. A Presbyterian, he qualified as a solicitor in 1882. He was active in the Irish Unionist Party, and by 1907 was the honorary secretary of the West Down Unionist Registration Association. He was the election agent for William MacCaw at the 1907 West Down by-election, although MacCaw withdrew in favour of Lord Arthur Hill.

Hayes was elected to the British House of Commons, without facing an opponent, for the Ulster Unionist Party, at the 1922 West Down by-election. He is not recorded as having spoken in the House of Commons His constituency was abolished at the November general election, and Hayes did not stand for Parliament again.

== See also ==
- List of United Kingdom MPs with the shortest service

Parliament of the United Kingdom
Preceded by Thomas Browne Wallace	Member of Parliament for West Down; February 1922 – November 1922	Constituency abolished
