= West Down (UK Parliament constituency) =

Parliamentary constituency in the United Kingdom, 1885–1922

- Former county constituency for the House of Commons
- County: County Down

1885–1922
- Seats: 1
- Created from: County Down
- Replaced by: Down

West Down was a United Kingdom parliamentary constituency in Ireland. It returned one Member of Parliament (MP) to the House of Commons of the United Kingdom from 1885 to 1922, on the electoral system of first past the post.

== Boundaries ==
From 1801 to 1885, County Down returned two MPs to the House of Commons of the United Kingdom sitting at the Palace of Westminster, with separate representation for the parliamentary boroughs of Downpatrick and Newry. Under the Redistribution of Seats Act 1885, Downpatrick ceased to exist as a parliamentary borough and the parliamentary county was divided into four divisions: North Down, East Down, West Down, and South Down.

Under the Redistribution of Seats (Ireland) Act 1918, Newry ceased to exist as a parliamentary borough, and the parliamentary county gained the additional division of Mid Down. Sinn Féin contested the 1918 general election on an abstentionist platform that instead of taking up any seats at Westminster, they would establish a revolutionary assembly in Dublin. All MPs elected to Irish seats were invited to participate in the First Dáil convened in January 1919, but no members outside of Sinn Féin did so.

The Government of Ireland Act 1920 established the Parliament of Northern Ireland, which came into operation in 1921. The representation of Northern Ireland in the Parliament of the United Kingdom was reduced from 30 MPs to 13 MPs, taking effect at the 1922 United Kingdom general election. At Westminster, the five divisions of County Down were replaced by a two-member county constituency of Down. An eight-seat constituency of Down was created for the House of Commons of Northern Ireland, which formed the basis in republican theory for representation in the Second Dáil.

1885–1918	The baronies of Iveagh Lower, Lower Half, and Iveagh Lower, Upper Half, and that part of the barony of Iveagh Upper, Upper Half lying within the parishes of Aghaderg, Annaclone and Seapatrick.
1918–1922	The rural district of Moira; the rural district of Banbridge, except for the district electoral divisions of Ballyward, Crossgar and Leitrim (included in the East Down division); and the urban districts of Banbridge and Dromore.

== Members of Parliament ==
Election	Member	Party
1885	Lord Arthur Hill	Irish Conservative
1886	Lord Arthur Hill	Irish Conservative
1886 b	Lord Arthur Hill	Irish Conservative
1892	Lord Arthur Hill	Irish Unionist
1895	Lord Arthur Hill	Irish Unionist
1898 b	Arthur Hill	Irish Unionist
1900	Arthur Hill	Irish Unionist
1905 b	Harry Liddell	Irish Unionist
1906	Harry Liddell	Irish Unionist
1907 b	Lord Arthur Hill	Irish Unionist
1908 b	William MacCaw	Irish Unionist
Jan. 1910	William MacCaw	Irish Unionist
Dec. 1910	William MacCaw	Irish Unionist
1918	Daniel Martin Wilson	Irish Unionist
1921 b	Thomas Browne Wallace	UUP
1922 b	Hugh Hayes	UUP
1922	constituency abolished	

== Elections ==
=== Elections in the 1880s ===
1885 general election: West Down
Party	Candidate	Votes	%	±%
Irish Conservative	Lord Arthur Hill	Unopposed		
Irish Conservative win (new seat)				

1886 general election: West Down
Party	Candidate	Votes	%	±%
Irish Conservative	Lord Arthur Hill	6,589	84.6	N/A
Irish Parliamentary	John Baptish McHugh	1,199	15.4	New
Majority		5,390	69.2	N/A
Turnout		7,788	80.3	N/A
Registered electors		9,695		
Irish Conservative hold		Swing	N/A	

Hill was re-appointed Comptroller of the Household, requiring a by-election.

1886 West Down by-election
Party	Candidate	Votes	%	±%
Irish Conservative	Lord Arthur Hill	Unopposed		
Irish Conservative hold				

=== Elections in the 1890s ===
1892 general election: West Down
Party	Candidate	Votes	%	±%
Irish Unionist	Lord Arthur Hill	Unopposed		
Irish Unionist hold				

1895 general election: West Down
Party	Candidate	Votes	%	±%
Irish Unionist	Lord Arthur Hill	Unopposed		
Irish Unionist hold				

- Hill resigned.

1898 West Down by-election
Party	Candidate	Votes	%	±%
Irish Unionist	Arthur Hill	Unopposed		
Irish Unionist hold				

=== Elections in the 1900s ===
1900 general election: West Down
Party	Candidate	Votes	%	±%
Irish Unionist	Arthur Hill	Unopposed		
Irish Unionist hold				

- Hill resigns.

1905 West Down by-election
Party	Candidate	Votes	%	±%
Liberal Unionist	Harry Liddell	4,037	57.2	N/A
Ind. Unionist	Andrew Beattie	3,015	42.8	New
Majority		1,022	14.4	N/A
Turnout		7,052	85.4	N/A
Registered electors		8,254		
Liberal Unionist hold		Swing	N/A	

1906 general election: West Down
Party	Candidate	Votes	%	±%
Irish Unionist	Harry Liddell	Unopposed		
Irish Unionist hold				

- Liddell resigns.

1907 West Down by-election
Party	Candidate	Votes	%	±%
Irish Unionist	Lord Arthur Hill	3,702	55.9	N/A
Ind. Unionist	Andrew Beattie	2,918	44.1	New
Majority		784	11.8	N/A
Turnout		6,620	79.1	N/A
Registered electors		8,369		
Irish Unionist hold		Swing	N/A	

- Hill resigns.

1908 West Down by-election
Party	Candidate	Votes	%	±%
Irish Unionist	William MacCaw	4,051	59.5	N/A
Ind. Unionist	Andrew Beattie	2,760	40.5	N/A
Majority		1,291	19.0	N/A
Turnout		6,811	82.7	N/A
Registered electors		8,233		
Irish Unionist hold		Swing	N/A	

=== Elections in the 1910s ===
January 1910 general election: West Down
Party	Candidate	Votes	%	±%
Irish Unionist	William MacCaw	Unopposed		
Irish Unionist hold				

December 1910 general election: West Down
Party	Candidate	Votes	%	±%
Irish Unionist	William MacCaw	Unopposed		
Irish Unionist hold				

General Election 14 December 1918: West Down
Party	Candidate	Votes	%	±%
Irish Unionist	Daniel Martin Wilson	10,559	85.7	N/A
Sinn Féin	Bernard Campbell	1,725	14.0	New
Majority		8,834	71.7	N/A
Turnout		12,284	68.3	N/A
Registered electors		17,997		
Irish Unionist hold		Swing		

- Wilson appointed as Recorder of Belfast

1921 West Down by-election
Party	Candidate	Votes	%	±%
UUP	Thomas Browne Wallace	Unopposed		
UUP hold				

- Wallace appointed Chief Clerk to the High Court of Northern Ireland

1922 West Down by-election
Party	Candidate	Votes	%	±%
UUP	Hugh Hayes	Unopposed		
UUP hold				

== Sources ==
- Walker, Brian M., ed. (1978). Parliamentary Election Results in Ireland, 1801–1922. Dublin: Royal Irish Academy. ISBN 0901714127.
- Stenton, M.; Lees, S., eds. (1978). Who's Who of British members of parliament: Volume II 1886–1918. The Harvester Press.
- Stenton, M.; Lees, S., eds. (1979). Who's Who of British members of parliament: Volume III 1919–1945. The Harvester Press.
- Leigh Rayment's Historical List of MPs – Constituencies beginning with "D" (part 3)
