= 1905 West Down by-election =

Election in the United Kingdom

The 1905 West Down by-election was held on 10 July 1905 after the incumbent Irish Unionist Arthur Hill resigned. It was retained by the Irish Unionist candidate Harry Liddell.

West Down by-election, 1905
Party	Candidate	Votes	%	±%
Irish Unionist	Harry Liddell	4,037	51.8	N/A
Ind. Unionist	Andrew Beattie	3,762	48.2	New
Majority		275	2.6	N/A
Turnout		7,799	85.4	N/A
Irish Unionist hold		Swing	N/A	
