= 1886 West Down by-election =

UK Parliamentary by-election

The 1886 West Down, by-election was a parliamentary by-election held for the United Kingdom House of Commons constituency of West Down on 13 August 1886. Following the general election of that year and the formation of a new government, Lord Arthur Hill, elected member for the constituency, was appointed to the post of Comptroller of the Household, which by the rules of the time required him to submit to re-election. No other candidate was nominated, and therefore Hill was elected unopposed.
