= Harry Liddell =

British politician

Harry Liddell (1866–1931) was a British politician. He was elected (Irish Unionist) Member of Parliament for West Down in 1905, resigning in 1907 by becoming Steward of the Manor of Northstead.

He was born in Donacloney, Northern Ireland in 1866. Growing up, he served as an apprentice in his father's linen business. He represented the firm Liddel and Co. in the United States until his father died. He then returned to Donaghcloney and took over the business.

Liddell was elected (Irish Unionist) Member of Parliament for West Down in 1905, defeating Alderman Andrew Beattie.

Parliament of the United Kingdom
Preceded by Arthur Hill	Member of Parliament for West Down; 1905–1907	Succeeded by Lord Arthur Hill
