= Kilmore, County Down =

Coordinates: 54.388°N 5.7867°W

Kilmore: Irish: an Chill Mhór
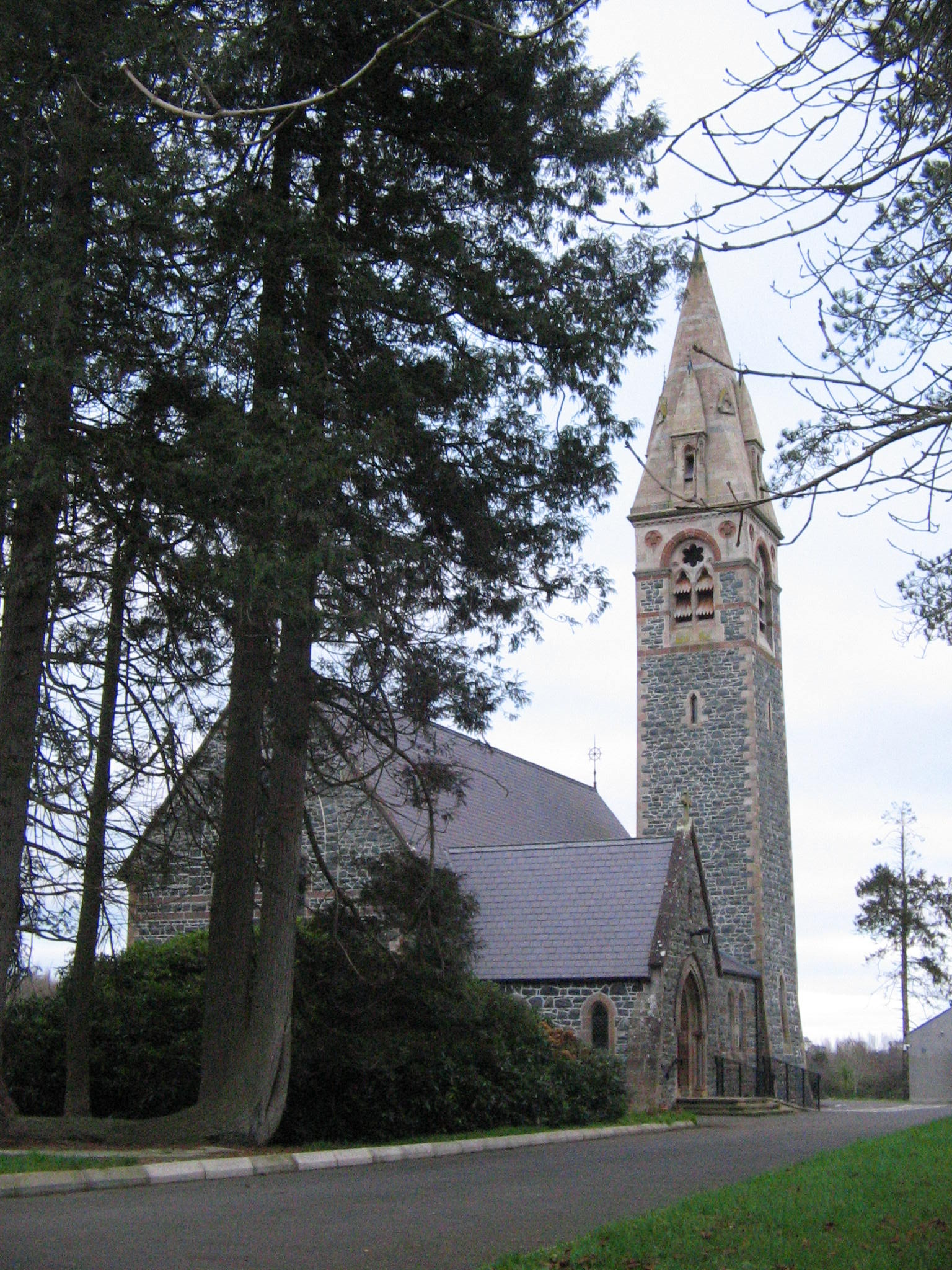
- Christ Church, Parish of Kilmore

- Location within County Down
- Population: 500 (2011 Census)
- District: Down
- County: County Down
- Country: Northern Ireland
- Sovereign state: United Kingdom
- Post town: DOWNPATRICK
- Postcode district: BT30
- Dialling code: 028
- Police: Northern Ireland
- Fire: Northern Ireland
- Ambulance: Northern Ireland
- UK Parliament: Strangford
- NI Assembly: Strangford

Kilmore is a village, civil parish and townland of 149 acres (60 ha) in County Down, Northern Ireland, about 1 mile (1.6 km) from Crossgar. It is situated in the historic baronies of Castlereagh Upper and Kinelarty.

== History ==
Kilmore derives its name from the Irish word 'an Chill Mhór', meaning "the big church". In ancient times, it was known as 'an Chill Mhór Moran'. It was the ancient ecclesiastical centre of this part of Co. Down. According to Fr. O’Laverty’s extensive history of Downe and Connor, it was likely to have been established around 800 A.D. and was a mensal parish of the Bishops of Nendrum, later known as Mahee Island (a mensal parish is a parish where the bishop, rather than the parish priest, serves as the parish priest. It is thought to have been founded by one of those bishops, called Moran, and was referred to in ancient papal records as Kilmore Moran. Records of the ancient church are scanty, but in the Terrier, a periodical which records the dues liable to be paid to the bishop the following account appears:-

“Eclesia de Kilmore Moran is the bishop’s mensal. The vicar pays in proxies six shillings and eight pence; in refections six shillings and eight pence; in synodals two shillings, it further adds, Kilmore Moran, five quarter lands having seven chapels.”

Today, it is known for the historic 18th century Anglican church the building for which is now located in the Ulster Folk and Transport Museum. Eighty years after the church was built in 1790, a new church was built nearby in 1870 to heal rifts within the church concerning the nature of Anglo-Catholic worship in the decades prior. It remains the place of worship for the same Church of Ireland congregation Church Parish of Kilmore to this day.

== Sport ==
Kilmore has a Football Club called Kilmore Rec FC, which plays at Robert Adams Park, Crossgar.

== Civil parish of Kilmore ==
The civil parish contains the villages of Crossgar and Kilmore.

=== Townlands ===
The civil parish contains the following townlands:

- Ballydyan
- Barnamaghery
- Broaghclogh (also known as Murvaclogher)
- Cahard
- Carnacally
- Clontaghnaglar
- Creevyargon
- Creevycarnonan
- Crossgar
- Drumaghlis
- Drumgiven
- Drumnaconagher
- Kilmore
- Lisnamore
- Lissara
- Listooder
- Magheralone
- Murvaclogher (also known as Broaghclogh)
- Rademon
- Raleagh
- Rossconor
- Teconnaught
- Tullynacree
