= Temple, County Down =

Northern Irish village

Coordinates: 54.4704°N 5.91741°W

Temple: Irish: Teampall
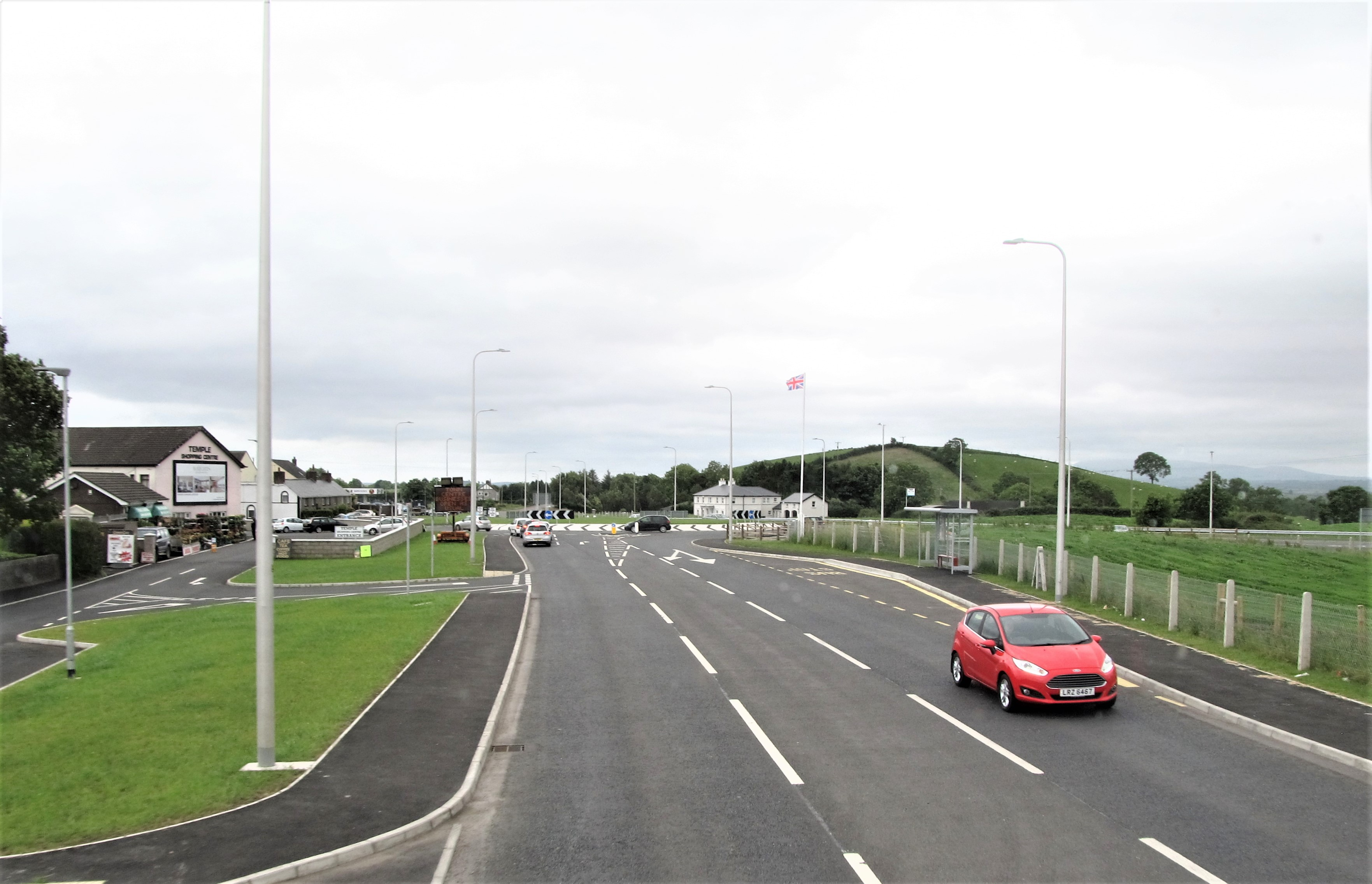
- Carryduff Road, Temple

- Location within County Down
- Irish grid reference: J3506659988
- District: Lisburn and Castlereagh
- County: County Down
- Country: Northern Ireland
- Sovereign state: United Kingdom
- Post town: LISBURN
- Postcode district: BT27
- Dialling code: 028
- Police: Northern Ireland
- Fire: Northern Ireland
- Ambulance: Northern Ireland
- UK Parliament: Lagan Valley
- NI Assembly: Lagan Valley

Temple, historically called The Temple (Irish: An Teampall), is a village in County Down, Northern Ireland. It is situated south of Carryduff and about 9 miles (14.5 km) from Belfast city centre.

== History ==
One of the earliest references to Temple dates back to 1858, when the name was first applied to a public house in the townland of Carricknaveagh. It was called "The Temple" because it was the meeting place for a freemasons' lodge.

The village is within the historic barony of Castlereagh Upper and the civil parish of Killaney.

First held in 1921, the Temple 100 were a series of road races which took place within Temple and the surrounding area. The circuit was updated over the years, but they were predominantly held between Temple and Carryduff, and then ultimately between Temple and Saintfield. The final race took place in 1999. It was the first ever and longest running pure road race in Ireland, and one of the oldest road races in the world.

== Places of interest ==
- Hinch Distillery, a whiskey and gin distillery located on the Killaney Estate.
- Temple Golf Club, a 9 hole course with 18 tee boxes which opened to the public in 1994.
- St. Andrew's Church, the Church of Ireland parish church in Killaney.

== Amenities ==
- Temple Shopping Centre
- SPAR (Convenience store and service station)

== Infrastructure ==
Public transport is served by Translink, Northern Ireland's public transport operator, via bus routes 518a, 520 and 652 on the A24 road, connecting the village to Belfast and Newcastle.

A new Park and Share facility was completed in January 2017.

== See also ==
- List of towns and villages in Northern Ireland
