= 1908 West Down by-election =

UK parliamentary by-election

The 1908 West Down by-election was held on 20 March 1908. The by-election was held due to the resignation of the incumbent Irish Unionist MP, Arthur Hill. It was won by the Irish Unionist candidate William MacCaw.

1908 West Down by-election
Party	Candidate	Votes	%	±%
Irish Unionist	William MacCaw	4,051	59.5	N/A
Ind. Unionist	Andrew Beattie	2,760	40.5	N/A
Majority		1,291	19.0	N/A
Turnout		6,811	82.7	N/A
Registered electors		8,233		
Irish Unionist hold		Swing	N/A	
