= Killaney (civil parish) =

Killaney: Irish: Cill Eanaigh
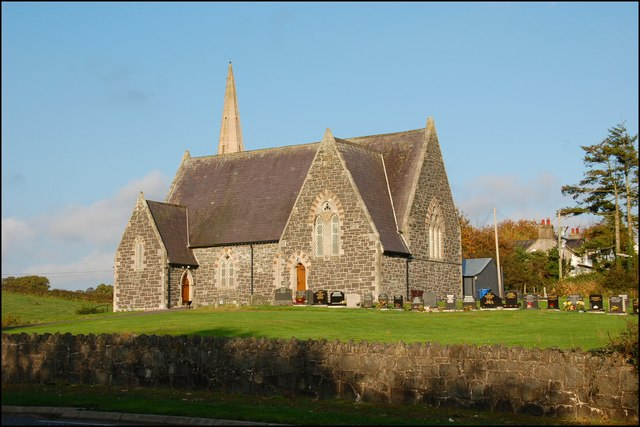
- St Andrews Parish Church, Killaney, in 2007
- County: County Down
- Country: Northern Ireland
- Sovereign state: United Kingdom
- Postcode district: BT27
- Dialling code: 028

Killaney (from Irish Cill Eanaigh, meaning 'church of the marsh') is a civil parish in County Down, Northern Ireland. It is situated in the historic barony of Castlereagh Upper. It is also a townland of 298 acres. Killaney lies east of Lough Henney, next to an area of bog to the south-west of Saintfield (civil parish).

== History ==
The first mention of the Parish of Killaney was in an 1194 charter granted by John de Courcy. A church and graveyard were built near Bow Lough. In the Irish Rebellion of 1641 the church was badly damaged and never rebuilt, although the graveyard remained (at grid ref: J357580). From then until the mid-19th century, appointments were still made to the parish, despite the lack of a church. In 1865 land was donated by the Marquess of Downshire for a church which was completed in 1867 and named for St. John the Evangelist. In the early 20th century the church became St. Andrews, the Church of Ireland parish church for Killaney (at grid ref: J359594). The church bell was a gift from St Patrick's Cathedral, Dublin. It is situated in the townland of Carrickmaddyroe.

There is a Presbyterian church also in the townland Carrickmaddyroe at grid ref: J355595.

== Townlands ==
The civil parish contains the following townlands:

- Carrickmaddyroe
- Carricknaveagh
- Killaney
- Lisbane

== See also ==
- List of civil parishes of County Down
