= Castlereagh Upper =

Castlereagh Upper An Caisleán Riabhach Uachtarach (Irish)
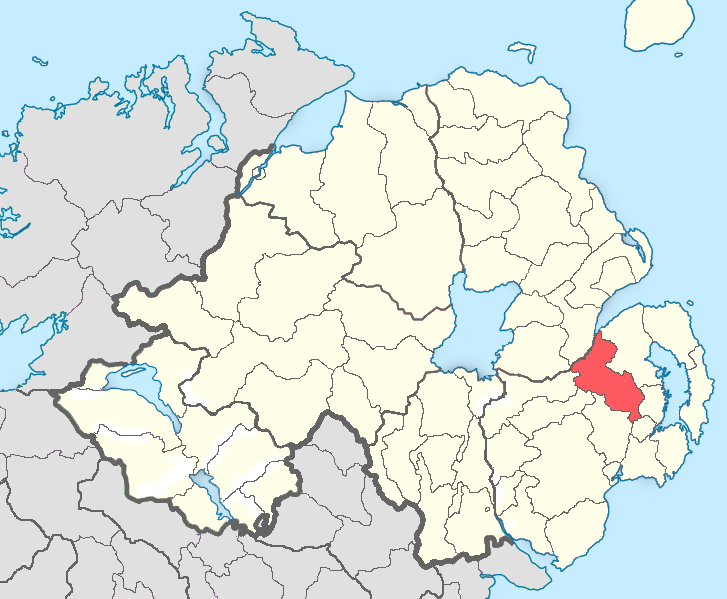
- Location of Castlereagh Upper, County Down, Northern Ireland.
- Sovereign state: United Kingdom
- Country: Northern Ireland
- County: Down

Castlereagh Upper (named after the former barony of Castlereagh) is a historic barony in County Down, Northern Ireland. It was created by 1841 with the division of Castlereagh into two. It is bordered by eight other baronies: Castlereagh Lower and Dufferin to the east; Lecale Lower and Kinelarty to the south; Iveagh Lower, Lower Half, Iveagh Lower, Upper Half, and Massereene Upper to the west; and Belfast Upper to the north.

== List of settlements ==
Below is a list of settlements in Castlereagh Upper:

=== Cities ===
- Belfast
- Lisburn

=== Towns ===
- Carryduff

=== Villages ===
- Ballygowan
- Kilmore
- Saintfield
- Temple

=== Population centres ===
- Ballymacarrett
- Newtownbreda
- Queen's Island

== List of civil parishes ==
Below is a list of civil parishes in Castlereagh Upper:

- Blaris (also partly in baronies of Iveagh Lower, Upper Half and Massereene Upper)
- Comber (also partly in barony of Castlereagh Lower)
- Drumbeg (also partly in barony of Belfast Upper)
- Drumbo
- Killaney
- Killinchy (also partly in baronies of Castlereagh Lower and Dufferin)
- Killyleagh (one townland, rest in barony of Dufferin)
- Kilmore (also partly in barony of Kinelarty)
- Knockbreda (also partly in barony of Castlereagh Lower)
- Lambeg (also partly in barony of Belfast Upper)
- Saintfield
