= South Londonderry (UK Parliament constituency) =

Parliamentary constituency in the United Kingdom, 1885–1922

Coordinates: 54.838°N 6.897°W

- Former county constituency for the House of Commons
- County: County Londonderry

1885–1922
- Seats: 1
- Created from: County Londonderry
- Replaced by: Londonderry

South Londonderry, or South Derry, was a parliament constituency in Ireland which returned one Member of Parliament to the House of Commons of the United Kingdom on the electoral system of first past the post from 1885 to 1922.

== Politics ==
The constituency was a majority unionist area. All three candidates at the 1918 general election were Catholics.

== Boundaries and boundary changes ==
Prior to 1885, County Londonderry returned two MPs to the House of Commons of the United Kingdom sitting at the Palace of Westminster. Under the Redistribution of Seats Act 1885, the parliamentary county was divided into the divisions of North Derry and South Derry. The parliamentary borough of Coleraine lost its separate representation.

South Derry was defined as:

The baronies of Loughinsholin, and the barony of Coleraine, except so much as is comprised in the North Derry division.

It was not affected by the Redistribution of Seats (Ireland) Act 1918. Sinn Féin contested the 1918 general election on an abstentionist platform that instead of taking up any seats at Westminster, they would establish a revolutionary assembly in Dublin. All MPs elected to Irish seats were invited to participate in the First Dáil convened in January 1919, but no members outside of Sinn Féin did so.

The Government of Ireland Act 1920 established the Parliament of Northern Ireland, which came into operation in 1921. The representation of Northern Ireland at Westminster was reduced from 30 MPs to 13 MPs, taking effect at the 1922 United Kingdom general election. At Westminster, Londonderry City, North Derry and South Derry were combined to form the single-seat county constituency of Londonderry. A five-seat constituency of Londonderry was created for the House of Commons of Northern Ireland, which formed the basis in republican theory for representation in the Second Dáil.

== Members of Parliament ==
Election	MP	Party
1885	Tim Healy	Irish Parliamentary
1886	Sir Thomas Lea	Liberal Unionist
1900	John Gordon	Liberal Unionist
1906	John Gordon	Liberal Unionist
Jan 10	John Gordon	Liberal Unionist
Dec 10	John Gordon	Liberal Unionist
1912	John Gordon	Irish Unionist
1916	Denis Henry	Irish Unionist
1918	Denis Henry	Irish Unionist
1921	Robert Chichester	Irish Unionist
1922	Sir William Pain	UUP

== Elections ==
=== Elections in the 1880s ===
1885 general election: South Londonderry
Party	Candidate	Votes	%	±%
Irish Parliamentary	Tim Healy	4,723	53.2	
Irish Conservative	Hugh McCalmont	2,341	26.4	
Liberal	William Findlater	1,816	20.5	
Majority		2,382	26.8	
Turnout		8,880	82.3	
Registered electors		10,790		
Irish Parliamentary win (new seat)				

1886 general election: South Londonderry
Party	Candidate	Votes	%	±%
Liberal Unionist	Thomas Lea	4,737	50.6	+24.2
Irish Parliamentary	Tim Healy	4,629	49.4	−3.8
Majority		108	1.2	N/A
Turnout		9,366	86.8	+4.5
Registered electors		10,790		
Liberal Unionist gain from Irish Parliamentary		Swing	+14.0	

=== Elections in the 1890s ===
1892 general election: South Londonderry
Party	Candidate	Votes	%	±%
Liberal Unionist	Thomas Lea	4,554	52.9	+2.3
Liberal	Samuel Walker	4,053	47.1	New
Majority		501	5.8	+4.6
Turnout		8,607	91.8	+5.0
Registered electors		9,380		
Liberal Unionist hold		Swing		

1895 general election: South Londonderry
Party	Candidate	Votes	%	±%
Liberal Unionist	Thomas Lea	4,485	52.4	−0.5
Liberal	William Huston Dodd	4,068	47.6	+0.5
Majority		417	4.8	−1.0
Turnout		8,553	92.5	+0.7
Registered electors		9,247		
Liberal Unionist hold		Swing	−0.5	

=== Elections in the 1900s ===
1900 general election: South Londonderry
Party	Candidate	Votes	%	±%
Liberal Unionist	John Gordon	Unopposed		
Liberal Unionist hold				

1906 general election: South Londonderry
Party	Candidate	Votes	%	±%
Liberal Unionist	John Gordon	3,847	50.5	N/A
Russellite Unionist	Samuel Robert Keightley	3,776	49.5	New
Majority		71	1.0	N/A
Turnout		7,623	91.7	N/A
Registered electors		8,313		
Liberal Unionist hold		Swing	N/A	

=== Elections in the 1910s ===
January 1910 general election: South Londonderry
Party	Candidate	Votes	%	±%
Liberal Unionist	John Gordon	3,985	52.0	+1.5
Liberal	Samuel Robert Keightley	3,678	48.0	−1.5
Majority		307	4.0	+3.0
Turnout		7,663	95.2	+3.5
Registered electors		8,052		
Liberal Unionist hold		Swing	+1.5	

December 1910 general election: South Londonderry
Party	Candidate	Votes	%	±%
Liberal Unionist	John Gordon	3,845	52.3	+0.3
Liberal	William John Johnston	3,513	47.7	−0.3
Majority		332	4.6	+0.6
Turnout		7,358	91.4	−3.8
Registered electors		8,052		
Liberal Unionist hold		Swing	+0.3	

Gordon is appointed a judge, prompting a by-election.

1916 by-election: South Londonderry
Party	Candidate	Votes	%	±%
Irish Unionist	Denis Henry	3,808	94.7	+42.4
Ind. Unionist	Arthur Turnbull	214	5.3	New
Majority		3,594	89.4	+84.8
Turnout		4,022	47.8	−43.6
Registered electors		8,416		
Irish Unionist hold		Swing		

1918 general election: South Londonderry
Party	Candidate	Votes	%	±%
Irish Unionist	Denis Henry	8,942	54.7	+2.4
Irish Parliamentary	Arthur W. Conway	3,981	24.4	New
Sinn Féin	Louis Joseph Walsh	3,425	21.0	New
Majority		4,961	30.3	+25.9
Turnout		16,348	77.1	−14.3
Registered electors		21,199		
Irish Unionist hold		Swing		

=== Elections in the 1920s ===
Henry is appointed Lord Chief Justice of Northern Ireland, prompting a by-election.

1921 by-election: South Londonderry
Party	Candidate	Votes	%	±%
UUP	Robert Chichester	Unopposed		
UUP hold				

Chichester dies, causing a by-election.

1922 by-election: South Londonderry
Party	Candidate	Votes	%	±%
UUP	William Pain	Unopposed		
UUP hold				
