= Denis Henry =

Irish lawyer and politician

The Right Honourable Sir Denis Henry Bt KBE KC
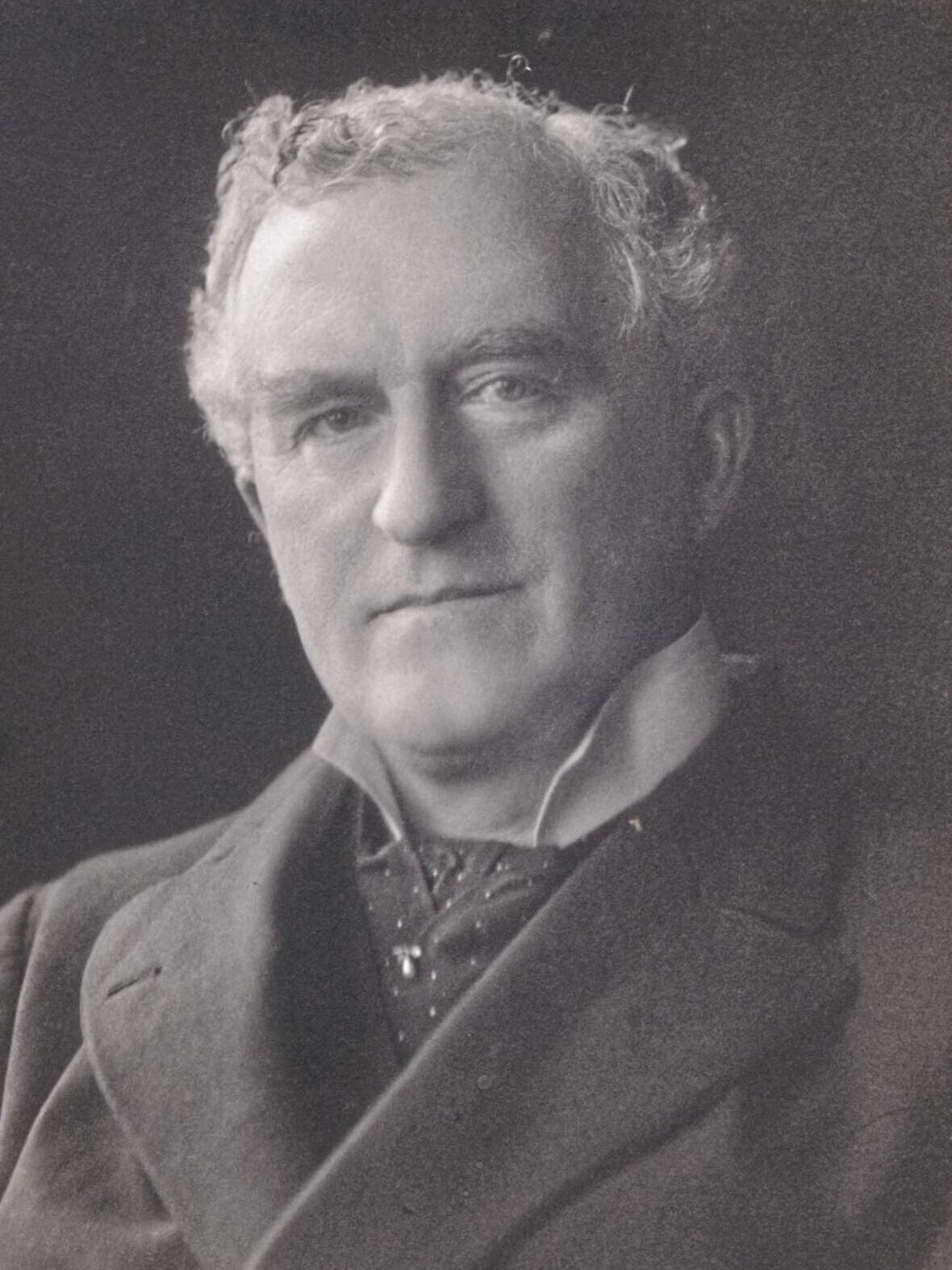

1st Lord Chief Justice of Northern Ireland
- In office 1922–1925
- Monarch: George V
- Preceded by: new office
- Succeeded by: Sir William Moore, Bt

Attorney-General for Ireland
- In office 1919–1921
- Monarch: George V
- Preceded by: Arthur Samuels
- Succeeded by: Thomas Watters Brown

Solicitor-General for Ireland
- In office 1918–1919
- Monarch: George V
- Preceded by: John Blake Powell
- Succeeded by: Daniel Martin Wilson

Member of Parliament
- In office 1916–1921
- Preceded by: John Gordon
- Succeeded by: Robert Chichester
- Constituency: South Londonderry

Personal details
- Born: 7 March 1864 Cahore, Draperstown, County Londonderry, Ireland
- Died: 1 October 1925 (aged 61) Belfast, Northern Ireland
- Citizenship: British citizenship
- Party: Ulster Unionist
- Spouse: Violet Holmes
- Children: James
- Education: Queen's College, Belfast
- Profession: Barrister

Sir Denis Stanislaus Henry, 1st Baronet (7 March 1864 – 1 October 1925), was an Irish lawyer and politician who became the first Lord Chief Justice of Northern Ireland.

Henry was born in Cahore, Draperstown, County Londonderry, the son of James Henry, a farmer, a landlord, and a prosperous Catholic businessman. He was educated at Marist College, Dundalk, Mount St Mary's College, Spinkhill, North East Derbyshire (a Jesuit foundation) and Queen's College, Belfast, where he won every law scholarship available to a student in addition to many other prizes and exhibitions. In 1885, he was called to the Bar of Ireland.

During the general election campaign of 1895, Henry spoke in support of unionist candidates in two constituencies: Thomas Lea in South Londonderry, Henry's native constituency, and E. T. Herdman in East Donegal.

Henry's legal career flourished: he became a queen's counsel in 1896 (which became a king's counsel on 21 January 1901 when Queen Victoria died), a Bencher of the King's Inns in 1898 and ultimately father of the north-west circuit of assizes. In March 1905, he was a delegate at the inaugural meeting of the Ulster Unionist Council and in the North Tyrone by-election in 1907 he was the unionist candidate, losing by a mere seven votes.

On 23 May 1916, he became an MP in the South Londonderry by-election, the first to be held in Ireland after the Easter Rising.

In November 1918, Henry became Solicitor-General for Ireland and, in July 1919, Attorney General for Ireland. Speaking in the House of Commons on 22 June 1920 Henry commented on how British troops in Ireland were instructed to behave as if on a battlefield. He later served as the first Lord Chief Justice of Northern Ireland from 1921 to 1925. In 1923, he became a Baronet, of Cahore in the County of Londonderry.

He married Violet Holmes, daughter of Hugh Holmes, a judge of the Court of Appeal in Ireland, and Olivia Moule of Elmley Lovett, Worcestershire. They had five children, including James Holmes Henry, who succeeded as second baronet. It was a mixed marriage as Violet was a staunch member of the Church of Ireland. Despite their religious difference, the marriage is said to have been happy.

Henry died in 1925, aged 61, and was buried near his native Draperstown.

Parliament of the United Kingdom
Preceded by John Gordon	Member of Parliament for South Londonderry; 1916–1921	Succeeded by Robert Chichester
Legal offices
Preceded by John Blake Powell	Solicitor-General for Ireland; 1918–1919	Succeeded by Daniel Martin Wilson
Preceded by Arthur Samuels	Attorney-General for Ireland; 1919–1921	Succeeded by Thomas Watters Brown
New office	Lord Chief Justice of Northern Ireland; 1922–1925	Succeeded by William Moore
Baronetage of the United Kingdom
New creation	Baronet (of Cahore); 1923–1925	Succeeded by James Holmes Henry
