= William Pain =

Ulster unionist (1855 – 1924)

Brigadier-General Sir William Pain KBE CB
- Born: 5 February 1855
- Died: 14 February 1924 (aged 69); Osborne House, Isle of Wight
- Burial place: Whippingham, Isle of Wight
- Military career
- Allegiance: United Kingdom, Ulster
- Branch: British Army, Ulster Volunteers (1913–1914)
- Service years: 1875–1912, 1914–1919
- Rank: Brigadier-General
- Unit: 36th (Ulster) Division
- Commands: 108th Infantry Brigade; Northern district of Ireland
- Conflicts: Mahdist War, Second Boer War, First World War, Irish War of Independence
- Awards: Knight Commander of the Order of the British Empire (KBE), Companion of the Order of the Bath (CB), Order of Medjidie 3rd class, Order of Osminieh 3rd class
- Other work: RIC Commander, MP for South Londonderry

Brigadier-General Sir George William Hacket Pain, KBE, CB (5 February 1855 – 14 February 1924) was a British Army officer and Royal Irish Constabulary commissioner. He played a key part in setting up the Ulster Volunteers as a unionist militia during the Home Rule crisis of 1912, and was believed to have organised gun-running. At the outbreak of the First World War he served in command of a Brigade of the Ulster Division and commanding British forces in the north of Ireland. He served briefly as a Unionist Member of Parliament.

== Early career ==
Hacket Pain joined the British Army in 1875, initially serving part-time in the Royal Wiltshire Militia, and in October of that year as a Lieutenant of Militia he passed the qualifying examination of the Civil Service Commissioners. He received his first commission in regular army on 20 November 1875, as a lieutenant in the 102nd Foot, and then joined the 2nd Regiment of Foot (Queen's Royal Regiment (West Surrey)) on 18 December 1875. Promotion to captain followed on 15 February 1886.

== Sudan ==
From 1888, Hacket Pain served in the Sudan during the Mahdist War as a captain in the West Surreys. He took part in the action at Fort Gamaizah (near Suakin), and served with the Nile Frontier Force in 1889 winning the Order of Medjidie Third Class. In February 1891 he was present at the capture of Tokar, in command of a battalion of Egyptian infantry; his horse was shot from under him. At the end of the war, he was awarded the Order of Osmanieh Third Class, which he was given a Royal Licence to wear on his British uniform.

== Colonial Africa ==
On 15 May 1894 Captain Hacket Pain became a major, transferring from the Queen's Royal West Surrey Regiment to the Worcestershire Regiment. He accompanied the expedition to Dongola in 1896, taking part in the operations of 7 June (in which his horse was again shot) and 19 September; on 3 November 1896 he was mentioned in despatches.

In November 1896 Hacket Pain was promoted from major to brevet lieutenant-colonel. He was still employed with the Egyptian Army, and served in Egypt with the Nile Expedition as an Acting Adjutant-General of the Egyptian Army at their base from 1896 to 1898.

On 27 December 1898, he married Saidie Merton, an Australian, at Cairo. Hacket Pain's wife was from a Jewish family and in 1908 she unsuccessfully challenged her grandfather's will which gave her the proceeds of the investment of £1,500 but provided that it would be cut off should she marry outside the Jewish faith.

== South African war ==
Hacket Pain served in South Africa throughout the Second Boer War of 1899-1902. He was confirmed as a lieutenant-colonel on 17 February 1900, and served in command of the 2nd Battalion of the Worcestershire Regiment from 12 February 1900 to 31 May 1902, including as Commander of Troops at Rietfontein from October to December 1900. During the war he took part in operations in Colesberg in January and February 1900, in Lindley on 26 June, Bethlehem on 6–7 July, and Wittebergen throughout July 1900. He was again mentioned in despatches on 10 September 1901. Hacket Pain was honoured for his service by being made a Companion of the Order of the Bath (CB) in the September 1901 South Africa honours list (the award was dated to 29 November 1900), and on 10 December 1901 he was promoted to a brevet colonel. During Spring 1902 he fell ill, and was only discharged from hospital in late July, after the end of the war the previous month. He left Cape Town for the United Kingdom a few days later, and returned to Southampton in August. Back in Britain, he received the actual decoration of CB from King Edward VII at Buckingham Palace on 24 October 1902.

His promotion to full colonel was confirmed on 23 February 1907, and in 1908 he was placed in command of the South Midland district, in which post he served for three years. He was put on half pay on 21 April 1911, and left the Army on Retired Pay on 5 February 1912.

== Ulster Volunteers ==
Hacket Pain's retirement from the Army coincided with preparations in the north of Ireland for active resistance to Home Rule. At the beginning of 1912 many Unionists had offered their services and begun drilling with dummy rifles, which were considered ridiculous by their political opponents. According to Timothy Bowman's history, Hacket Pain was among a select group of senior officers specifically recruited by the Unionist establishment. His appointment as chief of staff to Lieutenant-General Sir George Richardson, the General Officer Commanding of the Volunteers was announced in September 1913. Hacket Pain was English and a member of the Church of England.

Under Hacket Pain's guidance, the Volunteers were organised and trained in military effectiveness. He insisted, however, that Volunteer units should use their own ranks rather than traditional British Army ones, and reprimanded units which failed to follow this approach. Hacket Pain was fully supportive of the Ulster Volunteers' political agenda, and made a political speech at a smoking concert for a section of the East Belfast Regiment in Ballynafeigh in August 1914.

== Larne Gun Running ==
Just as the Ulster Volunteers knew they needed armaments, the British authorities were keen to stop them from landing guns on Irish shores. At the end of March 1914, just as the Ulster Volunteers were readying for an imminent civil war, a Norwegian steamer called Fanny was filled full of 35,000 rifles from Germany, and gave its destination as "Öreland" (sic). Two English-speaking people were said to be on board. The owners of the ship insisted that the destination was in fact South America, and some connected the cargo with the Mexican Revolution, but on 25 April the Fanny (disguised as the Mountjoy) landed its cargo at Larne, Bangor and Donaghadee having outwitted Customs. The Ulster Volunteers had been given a general mobilisation order on Friday 24 April and made sure that all roads leading to the disembarking centres had been blocked and that key telephone wires had been cut. 500 cars were used to distribute the rifles.

According to his obituary in The Times, Hacket Pain "was always believed to have planned and carried out" this operation. Timothy Bowman's history notes that Hacket Pain was given the credit but that Fred Crawford, who organised the shipment, regarded him as a 'dove' in the ruling councils of the Volunteers. However it is known that Hacket Pain wrote to Crawford in January 1914 asking for a statement of the arms which Crawford had already imported, and requesting Crawford to undertake further gun-running if authorised by Edward Carson. After their safe landing, he issued a memorandum instructing all units that "in the event of any attempt being made to seize arms, etc. ... intimation will be given to the officers in charge of the Constabulary that their armed attempt will be promptly and firmly resisted."

== First World War ==
Ulster Volunteers preparations for civil war were short-cut by the outbreak of the First World War. Hacket Pain re-enlisted in the British Army, and raised the 108th Infantry Brigade (part of the 36th (Ulster) Division) by recruiting the Ulster Volunteers. The Army welcomed the fact that the Volunteers were trained and armed, and Hacket Pain was appointed on 4 September to command the 108th Infantry Brigade in France. After two years he transferred back to Ireland to command the Northern Ireland district, where he served for three years.

As Chief Military Officer he faced the opening of the Irish War of Independence; in August 1919 he prohibited an Irish Nationalist procession from marching on the city walls of Derry, fearing that grave disorders would occur. However Hacket Pain sometimes resisted pressure. In January 1919 Dawson Bates wrote to Sir James Craig telling him that Hacket Pain was reluctant to bring out troops against Sinn Féin-inspired strikes in Belfast, or to do anything that might make the workers think they were being intimidated, despite pressure from people Bates described as "scare-mongers".

== Irish war of independence ==
On 1 November 1919 he retired from the Army again with the rank of brigadier-general, and received the award of Knight Commander of the Order of the British Empire. However, he was immediately re-employed as divisional commander of the Royal Irish Constabulary in Belfast.

Nationalist MP Joseph Devlin complained that this meant the chief of staff in Carson's army was responsible for protecting Roman Catholics. After riots and the murder of an RIC District Inspector in Lisburn, he put the town under military control in August 1920. Hacket Pain was reported to have resigned in early November 1920.

== Member of Parliament ==
On 18 January 1922, Hacket Pain was returned unopposed as Member of Parliament at Westminster for South Londonderry. His election came after the Government of Ireland Act 1920 had provided for a reduction of the number of Members of Parliament representing Ireland, which made it unlikely that Hacket Pain would have a long Parliamentary career. He made his maiden, and only, speech on 10 May 1922 in support of the Constabulary (Ireland) Act 1922. Hacket Pain served on the Standing Committee examining the Bill.

== Death ==
Retiring at the general election in October 1922, Hacket Pain lived at the United Services Club in Pall Mall for a short time. In October 1923 he was taken ill and became a patient at King Edward VII Convalescent Home for Officers at Osborne House on the Isle of Wight. He died there on 14 February 1924, and was buried at Whippingham on 18 February.

== See also ==
- List of United Kingdom MPs with the shortest service

Parliament of the United Kingdom
Preceded by Robert Chichester	Member of Parliament for South Londonderry; January–October 1922	Constituency abolished
