= William MacCaw =

British politician

William John MacGeagh MacCaw (1850 – 3 March 1928) was a British politician and Member of Parliament (MP) in the House of Commons of the United Kingdom of Great Britain and Ireland.

He was elected as the Irish Unionist Party MP for the West Down constituency at the 1908 West Down by-election, defeating the Independent Unionist candidate Andrew Beattie.

He was re-elected unopposed at the January 1910 and December 1910 general elections.

In February 1918 he was living in Godstone in Surrey, and was convicted of food hoarding. He did not contest the 1918 general election that was held later that year.

Parliament of the United Kingdom
Preceded by Lord Arthur Hill	Member of Parliament for West Down; 1908 – 1918	Succeeded by Daniel Martin Wilson
