= John Gordon (South Londonderry MP) =

Irish politician

The Right Honourable John Gordon PC (Ire)

Member of Parliament for South Londonderry
- In office 1900–1916

Attorney-General for Ireland
- In office June 1915 – April 1916
- Monarch: George V
- Prime Minister: H. H. Asquith

Judge in the High Court of Justice in Ireland
- In office April 1916 – 26 September 1922

Personal details
- Born: 23 November 1849 County Down, Ireland
- Died: 26 September 1922 (aged 72) Dublin, Ireland
- Party: Irish Unionist Alliance (after 1912)
- Other political affiliations: Liberal Unionist Party (until 1912)
- Education: University of Galway (BA, LLB); Queen's University of Ireland (LLD)

John Gordon PC (Ire) (23 November 1849– 26 September 1922) was an Irish lawyer and politician, who served as Attorney-General for Ireland and a Judge of the High Court.

== Life and career ==
Gordon was the son of Samuel Gordon, of Shankhill, County Down, and Arabella Barclay. He was educated at Queen's College Galway, a constituent college of the Queen's University of Ireland, where he held a senior scholarship in mathematics, graduating with a Bachelor of Arts degree in that subject (3rd class honours) in 1873, and Bachelor of Laws (LLB) in 1876. He served as auditor of the college's Literary and Debating Society for the 1873-1874 session. He was awarded an honorary Doctor of Law (LLD) on the dissolution of the Queen's University in 1882. He was called to the Irish Bar at the King's Inns in 1877.

He married Dorothy Clay, daughter of Robert Keating Clay, solicitor, in 1887; she predeceased him. They had one son, Alan, a barrister.

Gordon was elected a Member of Parliament for the South Londonderry constituency in 1900, as a representative of the Liberal Unionists and, after 1912, Irish Unionist interest, and served in the House of Commons until 1916. He was a committed Unionist, but had many nationalist friends, including Éamon de Valera.

On 1 October 1902, Gordon sent a letter to be read at the annual meeting of the Moray and Nairn Conservative Association. In this letter, he cited growing tensions in Europe and abroad in order to call for increased unity within the United Kingdom, stating that "We shall need amid the gathering difficulties of the future a united national voice in support of our empire's interests in peace or in where when these are threatened by a world-wide rivalry"

In June 1915 when his party joined the Asquith coalition government, he was appointed Attorney-General for Ireland, an office he held until April 1916, when he was appointed a judge of the King's Bench division of the High Court of Justice in Ireland. He also became a member of the Irish Privy Council in 1915.

He died in Dublin on 26 September 1922 aged 72, having been taken ill in a tram on his journey home from the Four Courts.

Maurice Healy, who vividly described many of the Irish judges of his youth in his memoir "The Old Munster Circuit" confessed that Gordon had made almost no impression on him, except that he refused to wear bright colours. A more favourable view is that during his relatively brief career on the Bench he was an impartial and conscientious judge. Despite his committed Unionist beliefs he chose after 1921 to remain a judge in the Irish Free State.

Parliament of the United Kingdom
Preceded by Sir Thomas Lea	Member of Parliament for South Londonderry; 1900–1916	Succeeded by Denis Henry
Legal offices
Preceded by Jonathan Pim	Attorney-General for Ireland; 1915–1916	Succeeded by James Campbell
