= 1907 West Down by-election =

UK Parliamentary by-election

The 1907 West Down by-election was held on 6 September 1907. The by-election was held due to the resignation of the incumbent Irish Unionist MP, Harry Liddell. It was won by the Irish Unionist candidate Arthur Hill.

1907 West Down by-election
Party	Candidate	Votes	%	±%
Irish Unionist	Lord Arthur Hill	3,702	55.9	N/A
Ind. Unionist	Andrew Beattie	2,918	44.1	New
Majority		784	11.8	N/A
Turnout		6,620	79.1	N/A
Registered electors		8,369		
Irish Unionist hold		Swing	N/A	
