= 1921 West Down by-election =

UK Parliamentary by-election

The 1921 West Down by-election to the Westminster parliament was held on 5 July 1921. The by-election was held due to the appointment as Recorder of Belfast of the incumbent UUP MP, Daniel Martin Wilson. The UUP candidate Thomas Browne Wallace was elected unopposed.
