= Thomas Watters Brown =

Irish lawyer, politician and judge

Thomas Brown KC, PC (Ireland), PC (Northern Ireland)

Member of Parliament for North Down
- In office 14 December 1918 – 21 February 1922
- Preceded by: William Mitchell-Thomson
- Succeeded by: Henry Wilson

Solicitor-General for Ireland
- In office 12 June 1921 – 5 August 1921
- Monarch: George V
- Preceded by: Daniel Martin Wilson
- Succeeded by: Position abolished

Personal details
- Born: 17 March 1879 Newtownards, Ireland, (now Northern Ireland)
- Died: 7 October 1944 (aged 65)
- Party: Ulster Unionist Party
- Education: Queen's University Belfast
- Profession: Barrister

Thomas Watters Brown, KC, PC, PC (NI) (17 March 1879 – 7 October 1944) was an Irish lawyer and politician.

Thomas Watters Brown was born at The Square in Newtownards, County Down on 17 March 1879 and was the son of James A. Brown, a wool draper, and Mary Anne Watters.

He was educated at Campbell College, Belfast and Queen's University Belfast. He was called to the Bar in 1907 and took silk in 1918.

He was elected Member of Parliament for North Down in 1918 and was appointed Solicitor-General for Ireland in June 1921. On 5 August of the same year, he was promoted to Attorney-General for Ireland. He was the last holder of both offices. He resigned as Attorney General for Ireland in December 1921, and served as a Judge of the High Court of Justice in Northern Ireland from 1922 until his death. He was appointed to the Privy Council of Northern Ireland in December 1922.

Parliament of the United Kingdom
Preceded by William Mitchell-Thomson	Member of Parliament for North Down; 1918–1922	Succeeded by Henry Wilson
Legal offices
Preceded by Daniel Martin Wilson	Solicitor-General for Ireland; June–August 1921	Office abolished
Preceded by Denis Henry	Attorney-General for Ireland; 5 August 1921 -16 November 1921	Office abolished
