= Robert Chichester (politician) =

British Army officer & politician (1873–1921)

Robert Chichester DL JP
- Born: 13 August 1873; Irish
- Died: 10 December 1921 (aged 48)
- Occupations: Soldier, politician

Lieutenant-Colonel Robert Peel Dawson Spencer Chichester (13 August 1873 – 10 December 1921) was an Irish soldier and politician.

== Background and family ==
Chichester was the son of Lord Adolphus Chichester (1836–1901, a son of the 4th Marquess of Donegall) and his wife Mary (née Dawson; died 1924), daughter of Robert Peel Dawson.

He married Dehra Kerr-Fisher, later member of the Northern Ireland Parliament for Londonderry and South Londonderry. They had a son and a daughter; their son predeceased them:

- Robert James Spencer Chichester (1902–1920)
- Marion Caroline Dehra Chichester (1904–1976); her children included Penelope Hobhouse, Prime Minister of Northern Ireland James Chichester-Clark, Baron Moyola, and Sir Robin Chichester-Clark

== Career ==
Chichester served in the British Central Africa Campaign (1897–1900) and was commissioned in the Irish Guards in August 1900. He was promoted to lieutenant 1 January 1901, and fought in the Boer War. On 22 January 1902 he was promoted to captain, and he was later promoted to major in the Irish Guards. He gained the rank of lieutenant-colonel in the service of the Royal Irish Rifles. He held the office of High Sheriff of County Londonderry for 1907 and was appointed High Sheriff of Antrim for 1911.

He was justice of the peace (JP) for counties Donegal, Antrim and Londonderry. He held the office of deputy lieutenant (DL) of counties Donegal, Antrim and Londonderry. He lived at Moyola Park, Castledawson, County Londonderry. He was briefly a member of parliament at Westminster for South Londonderry: his son-in-law, wife and a grandson were later members for South Londonderry in the Northern Ireland parliament and another grandson for Londonderry at Westminster.

== See also ==
- List of United Kingdom MPs with the shortest service

Parliament of the United Kingdom
Preceded by Denis Henry	Member of Parliament for South Londonderry; August 1921 – December 1921	Succeeded by William Pain
