= 1916 South Londonderry by-election =

UK Parliamentary by-election

The 1916 South Londonderry by-election was held on 22 May 1916. The by-election was held due to the resignation of the incumbent Irish Unionist MP, John Gordon. It was won by the Irish Unionist candidate Denis Henry (a Catholic).

It was the first by-election to be held in Ireland after the Easter rebellion, and the rebellion had had no discernible impact on the contest.

By-election, 1916: South Londonderry
Party	Candidate	Votes	%	±%
Irish Unionist	Denis Henry	3,808	94.7	+42.4
Ind. Unionist	Arthur Turnbull	214	5.3	New
Majority		3,594	89.4	+84.8
Turnout		4,022	47.8	−43.6
Registered electors		8,416		
Irish Unionist hold		Swing		
