= 1922 South Londonderry by-election =

UK Parliamentary by-election

The 1922 South Londonderry by-election was held on 18 January 1922. The by-election was held due to the death of the incumbent UUP MP, Robert Chichester who had won a by-election the previous August. It was won unopposed by the UUP candidate Sir William Pain.

Pain retired at the general election in October 1922 when the constituency was merged with others into a larger Londonderry constituency.
