= Saintfield (civil parish) =

Civil parish in County Down, Northern Ireland

Saintfield is a civil parish in County Down, Northern Ireland. It is situated in the historic barony of Castlereagh Upper.

== Settlements ==
The civil parish contains the village of Saintfield.

== Townlands ==
The civil parish contains the following townlands:

- Ballyagherty
- Ballyknockan
- Ballymacaramery
- Bresagh
- Carsonstown
- Craignasasonagh
- Creevyloughgare
- Drumaconnell East
- Drumaconnell West
- Drumalig
- Glasdrumman
- Killinure
- Leggygowan
- Lessans
- Lisdalgan
- Lisdoonan
- Lisnasallagh
- Lisowen
- Ouley
- Saintfield Parks
- Tonaghmore
- Tullywasnacunagh

== See also ==
- List of civil parishes of County Down
