= Daniel Martin Wilson =

Irish politician (1862–1932)

The Honourable Daniel Martin Wilson KC

Recorder of Belfast
- In office 1921–1927

Solicitor-General for Ireland
- In office 1919–1921
- Monarch: George V
- Preceded by: Denis Henry
- Succeeded by: Thomas Watters Brown

Member of Parliament
- In office 1918–1921
- Preceded by: William MacCaw
- Succeeded by: Thomas Browne Wallace
- Constituency: West Down

Personal details
- Born: 1862 Limerick, Ireland
- Died: 5 January 1932 (aged 69–70) Belfast, Northern Ireland
- Resting place: Dundonald Cemetery, Belfast, Northern Ireland
- Party: Ulster Unionist Party
- Other political affiliations: Irish Unionist Alliance
- Education: Trinity College Dublin
- Profession: Barrister

Military service
- Branch/service: British Army
- Years of service: 1914–1916
- Rank: Captain
- Unit: Royal Inniskilling Fusiliers

Daniel Martin Wilson KC (1862 – 5 January 1932) was an Irish politician and judge.

He was born in Limerick, the son of Rev. David Wilson, and was educated at the Royal Belfast Academical Institution and at Trinity College Dublin. He was married in Belfast in 1894 to Eleanor Black, herself the daughter of a Presbyterian minister.

He was appointed a Bencher of King's Inns in 1911. He served as a 2nd lieutenant with the Royal Inniskilling Fusiliers from 1914, was promoted to captain in 1915, and resigned from ill health in 1916.

He was Unionist Member of Parliament for West Down from December 1918 to 1921 and served in government as Solicitor General for Ireland from 1919 to June 1921. He stood down on appointment as Recorder of Belfast. He soon left that position when appointed a puisne judge of the High Court of Justice in Northern Ireland on its creation in October 1921 under the Government of Ireland Act 1920. In May 1923 the Land Commission, Northern Ireland was established and Wilson became the High Court's Land Judge (Judicial Commissioner of the Land Commission), a function which William Evelyn Wylie had performed prior to the Irish Free State (Consequential Provisions) Act 1922.

Parliament of the United Kingdom
Preceded by William MacCaw	Member of Parliament for West Down; 1918–1921	Succeeded by Thomas Browne Wallace
Legal offices
Preceded by Denis Henry	Solicitor-General for Ireland; 1919–1921	Succeeded by Thomas Watters Brown
