= 1921 South Londonderry by-election =

UK Parliamentary by-election

The 1921 South Londonderry by-election was held on 29 August 1921. The by-election was held due to the appointment as Lord Chief Justice of Northern Ireland of the incumbent UUP MP, Denis Henry. It was won unopposed by the UUP candidate Robert Chichester.

Chichester died less than four months later, leading to a further by-election in January 1922.
