= 1922 West Down by-election =

UK Parliamentary by-election

The 1922 West Down by-election was held on 17 February 1922. The by-election was held due to the appointment as Chief Clerk to the High Court of Northern Ireland of the incumbent Ulster Unionist MP, Thomas Browne Wallace. It was won by the UUP candidate Hugh Hayes.
