= Recorder of Belfast =

The Recorder of Belfast is one of the two senior County Court judges of Northern Ireland known as Recorders, the other being the Recorder of Londonderry.

The County Court judges in Northern Ireland are senior judicial officers, hearing civil actions, consumer claims, and appeals from magistrates' courts. They are called Family Care Centre judges when hearing appeals from the family proceedings courts and cases under the Children (Northern Ireland) Order 1995.

The Recorder of Belfast is deemed to be the Senior County Court Judge in the Province.

== History ==
In 1876, the Recorder of Belfast sat for eight sessions a year, plus four in the Quarter Sessions for County Antrim.

In the House of Commons on 2 March 1882 Joseph Biggar asked the Attorney-General for Ireland, W. M. Johnson, whether he was aware that the Recorder of Belfast was paid to act at elections as assessor to the chairman of Harbour Commissioners in Belfast, and whether that was contrary to the County Officers and Courts Act 1877. Johnson replied that the Recorder of Belfast was appointed to the role of assessor long before the 1877 act was enacted and was not affected by its Section 92.

The title of Recorder of Belfast was confirmed by Section 102 of the County Courts Act (Northern Ireland) 1959, which provides that "The judge, or (if more than one) one of the judges, assigned to the division which is or includes— (a) the area of the city of Belfast shall be styled the Recorder of Belfast".

In 2005, for the first time, a solicitor, Thomas Burgess, was appointed as Recorder, and with effect from April 2006 a new dimension was added to the Recorder's role by the Justice Act 2004, making him the Presiding Judge with responsibility for the County Courts.

The Recorder has the civic position of Second Citizen of Belfast, after the Lord Mayor.

== Salary ==
It was reported in June 2010 that with an annual salary of £149, 631, the Recorder was paid more than the British prime minister. This compared with £172,753 paid to each of the nine Justices of the High Court of Northern Ireland. In 2010 the Recorder's salary had been confirmed at 108 per cent of the Series 5 salary, paid to other County Court judges, with the Review Body on Senior Salaries noting that the office-holder was the Presiding Judge of the County Court and also heard non-jury, Diplock trials dealing with terrorism-related offences.

== List of Recorders ==
This list is incomplete

- 1873 to 1884: John Hastings Otway QC (1808–1884)
- 1884 to 1887: David Ross QC (died 1887)
- 1899 to 1909: Henry Fitzgibbon KC (1824–1909)
- 1909 to 1910: James Johnston Shaw KC LLD (1845–1910)
- 1911 to 1919: John Walker Craig KC (died 1926)
- 1919 to 1921: Charles Louis Matheson KC
- June–October 1921: Daniel Martin Wilson KC (1862–1932)
- 1927: Thomas H. Maxwell KC (acting)
- 1927 to 1941: Herbert Marshall Thompson KC (died 1945)
- 1941 to 1943: Arthur Black KC (1888–1968)
- 1952 to 1959: Bernard Joshua Fox QC
- 1956 (acting): Charles Stewart QC
- 1959 to 1978: Walter Topping (1908–1978)
- 1978 to 1982: James Alexander Brown TD QC
- 1982 to 1984: Eoin Higgins (1927–1993)
- 1984 to 1997: Frank Russell QC (1925–2013)
- 2005 to 2012: Thomas Burgess, solicitor
- 2012 to date: David McFarland QC
