= Crossgar =

Village in County Down, Northern Ireland

Coordinates: 54.3981°N 5.7647°W

Crossgar: Irish: an Chrois Ghearr
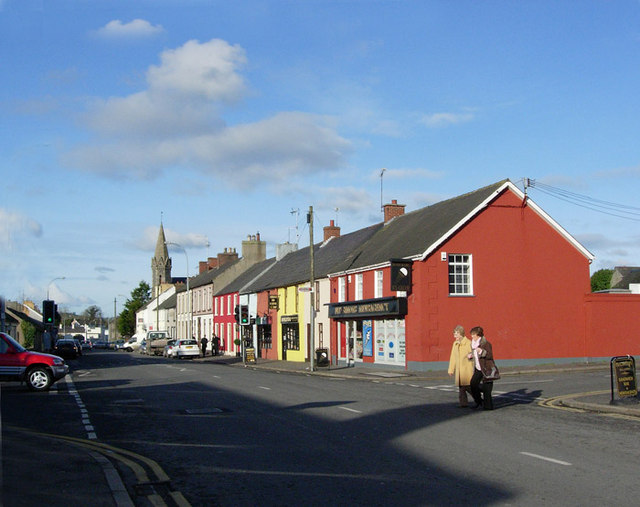

- Location within County Down
- Population: 1,997 (2021 Census)
- District: Newry, Mourne and Down
- County: County Down
- Country: Northern Ireland
- Sovereign state: United Kingdom
- Post town: DOWNPATRICK
- Postcode district: BT30
- Dialling code: 028
- Police: Northern Ireland
- Fire: Northern Ireland
- Ambulance: Northern Ireland
- UK Parliament: mostly South Down (and Strangford)
- NI Assembly: mostly South Down (and Strangford)

Crossgar (from Irish an Chrois Ghearr 'the short cross') is a village and townland in County Down, Northern Ireland. It is about 15 miles (24 km) south of Belfast, between Saintfield and Downpatrick. Crossgar had a population of 1,997 people in the 2021 UK Census.

== History ==
Crossgar has had an interesting and varied past, dating from the establishment of ancient Gaelic royal and ecclesiastical sites, the settlement of Anglo-Norman invaders, to Scots settlers, to the St. Patrick's Day riots in the 1800s. According to a history of Down and Connor by a Fr. O'Laverty, the parish of Kilmore, in which Crossgar lies, was likely to have been established around 800 AD and was the ecclesiastical centre of this part of County Down. It was thought that the area had seven chapels and these can be reasonably evident by the remains of burial grounds. But the seventh cannot be traced to a burial ground and is referred to as the "lost chapel of Cill Glaise". O'Laverty says that by tradition this chapel was built by Saint Patrick and left in the care of his disciples Glasicus and Liberius.

Prior to the creation of Crossgar as a village in the early 19th century, the area was simply known as Everogues Bridge (beside today's roundabout). Ever Og is said to have been a local chieftain in the 17th century, either Ever Og Magenis of Kilmore or Ever Og O’Nealle of Carrickmannon.

The name Crossgar comes from the Irish. It is the old Everogues crossing over the Glasswater River where Crossgar An Chrois Ghearr (meaning "the short cross") most likely gets its name. Although there is also a holy well known as St Mary's Well (Tobar Mhuire) which may suggest that in this case crois (cross) is referring to an ecclesiastical cross, no trace of which now remains. The adjective gearr (short) may suggest that the cross was damaged or in some way defective.

The parish of Kilmore comes from the Irish Cill Mhór meaning "big church" or another possible meaning is An Choill Mhór meaning "the big forest", which suggests that the area was covered by a large forest. Another location of one of the seven chapels is the townland of Killinchy (Cill Duinsí) meaning "Duinseach's Church".

In June 1920, during the Irish War of Independence, Irish Republican Army volunteers attacked the Royal Irish Constabulary barracks in Crossgar. They opened fire on the building, wounding two officers, and attempted to breach the walls with explosives before withdrawing.

== Places of interest ==
- Ulster Wildlife Centre was opened by David Attenborough in 1992.
- The Market House was derelict but has been restored and turned into a children's nursery.
- Crossgar is home to Ireland's first Disc Golf course, located on the Kilmore Road between Crossgar and Kilmore.
- Across from the Free Presbyterian Church is an Orange Hall which is home to the local Orange Lodge that is still active today with a flute band called Crossgar Young Defenders (CYD) that started in 1987.
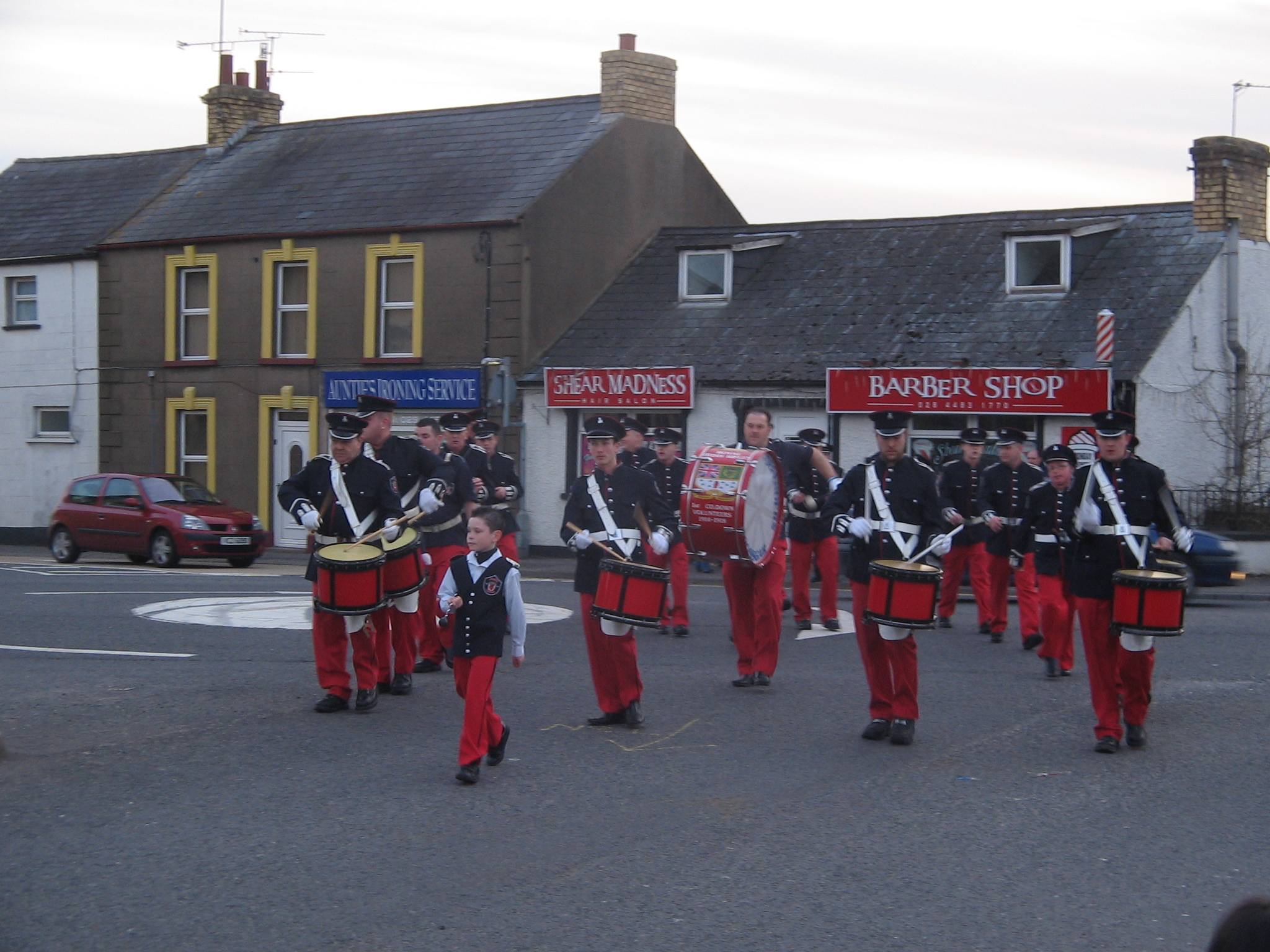
  Crossgar Young Defenders, open their annual parade by marching through their hometown.
- Crossgar is home of a football club called Kilmore Rec, they play at Robert Adams Park to
- Tobar Mhuire Retreat and Conference Centre is run by the resident Passionist community. The centre is in a former manor house, known as Crossgar House, bought from Colonel Llewellyn Palmer by the Passionists in 1950 to house their Juniorate until 1980. In 1976 Tobar Mhuire became a noviciate, before turning into a retreat and Prayer Centre in 1982.

=== Gallery ===
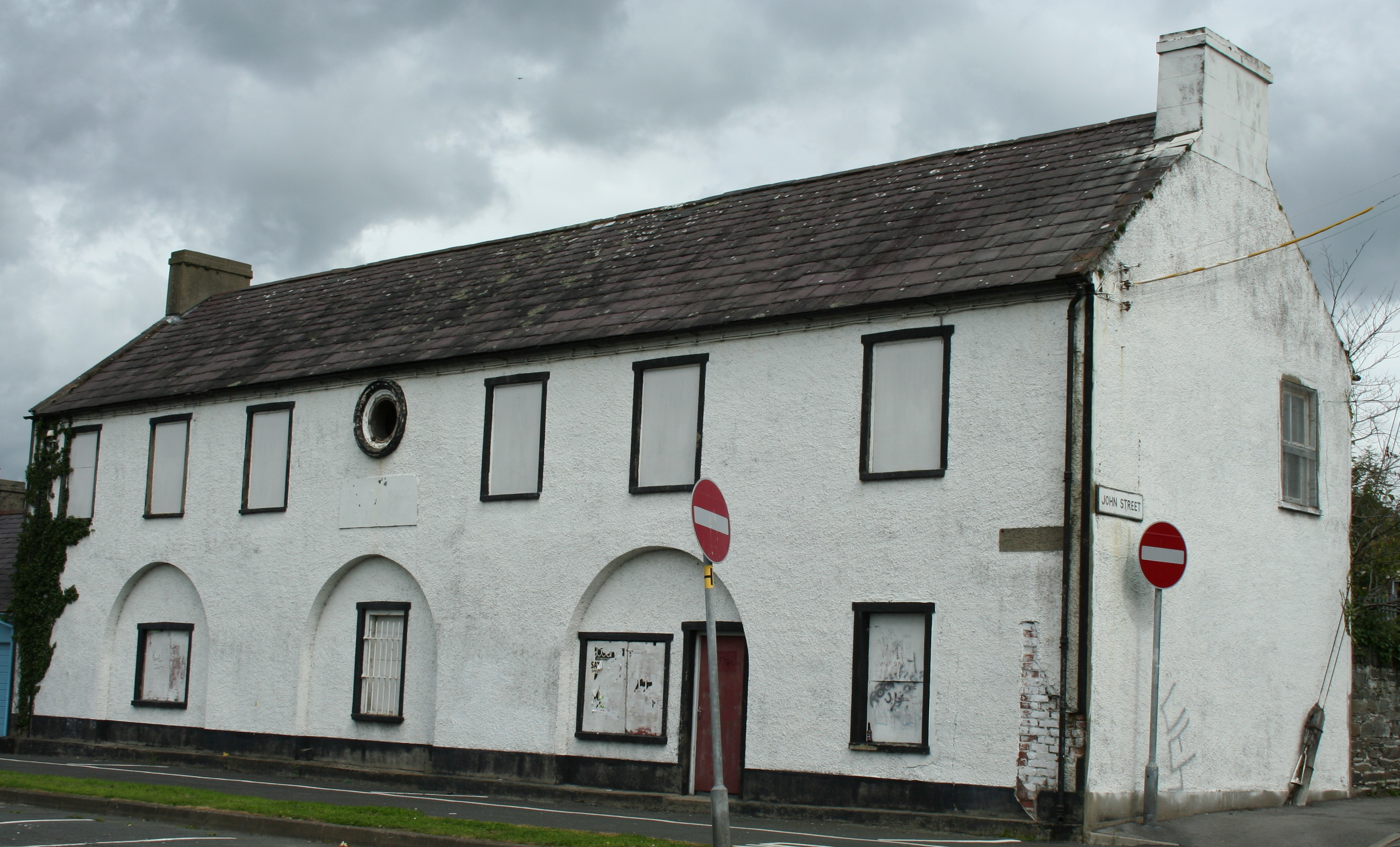
The Market House (1829)

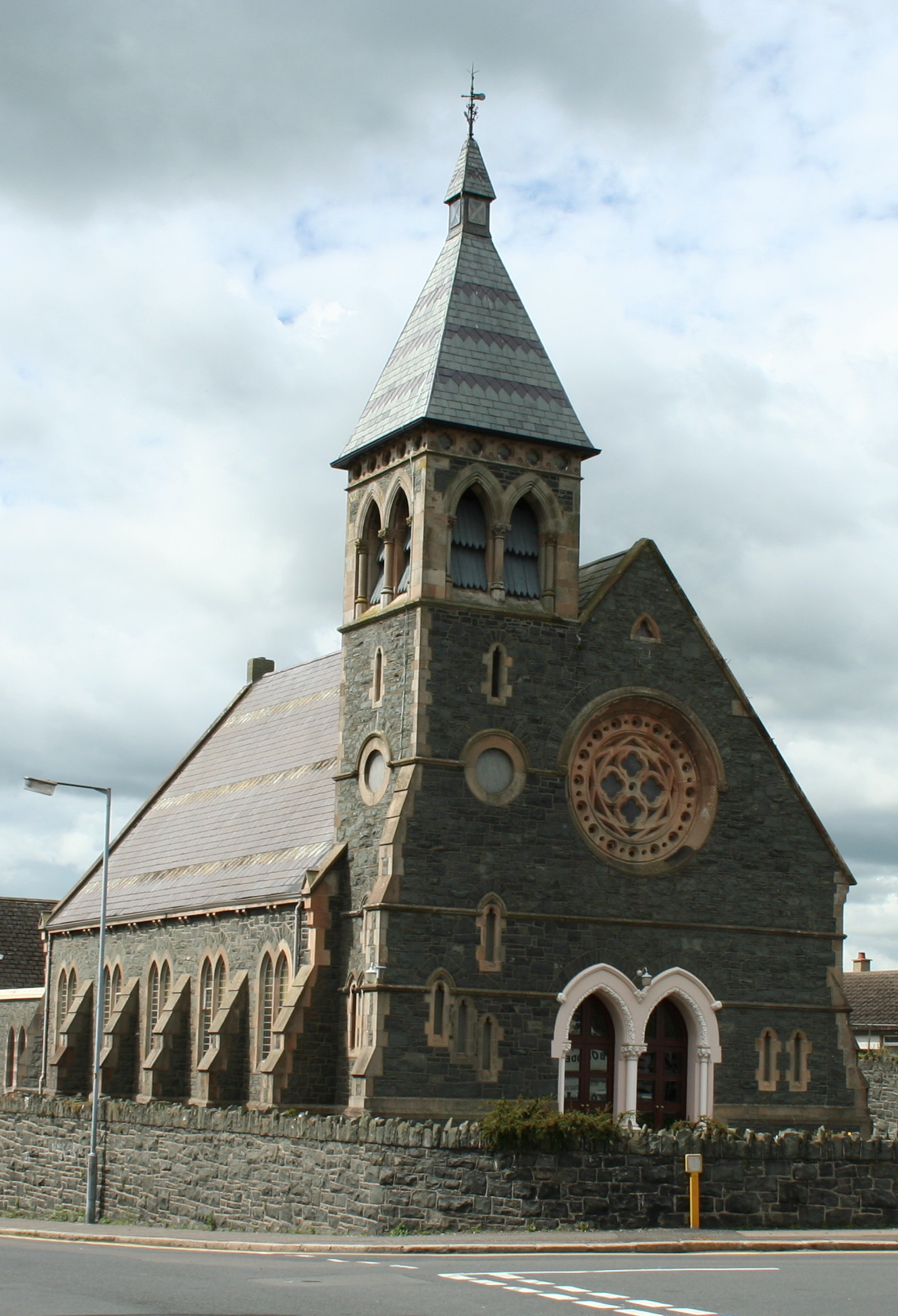
Lissara Presbyterian Church (1867)

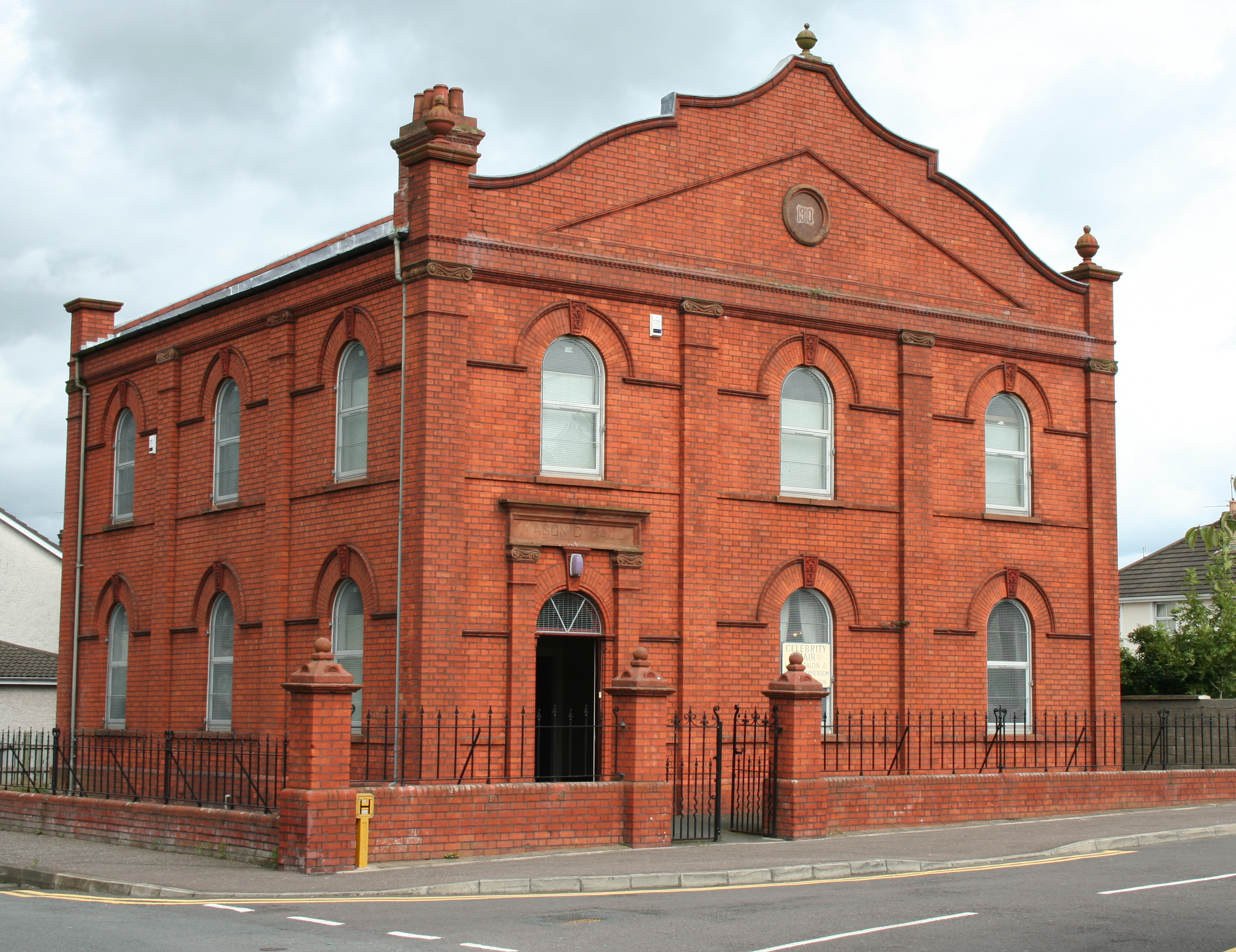
Masonic Hall (1910)

== Transport ==
Crossgar is on the main A7 road, 5 miles (8 km) north of Downpatrick and 16 miles (26 km) south of Belfast, and on the B7 minor road between Ballynahinch and Killyleagh.

The village is served by Ulsterbus route 15 and 215 Downpatrick to Belfast.

Crossgar railway station opened on 23 March 1859, but finally closed on 16 January 1950.

Parts of it from Downpatrick to Inch abbey then opened as a tourist attraction in late 2009 to commemorate the closing of the line 60 years ago.

== Demography ==
Crossgar is classified as a village by the NI Statistics and Research Agency (NISRA) (i.e. with population between 1,000 and 2,250 people). On Census day (25 March 2011) there were 1,872 people living in Crossgar, making it the 2643rd UK largest town. Of these:

- 22.3% were aged under 16 and 13.74% were aged 65 and over
- 49.26% of the population were male and 50.74% were female
- 59.45% were from a Catholic background and 34.95% were from a Protestant background
- 39.65% indicated that they had a British national identity, 35.46% had a Northern Irish national identity and 30.20% had an Irish national identity.

In 2001 there were 1,539 people living in Crossgar. Of these:

- 23.8% were aged under 16 and 18.6% were aged 60 and over
- 49.2% of the population were male and 50.8% were female
- 60% were from a Catholic background and 38.2% were from a Protestant or other Christian background

=== Population change of Crossgar Town ===
- 1831 Census = 474
- 1841 Census = 695
- 1851 Census = 860
- 1861 Census = 817
- 1871 Census = 688
- 1881 Census = 743
- 1891 Census = 583
- 1901 Census = 582
- 1911 Census = 553
- 1926 Census = 555
- 1937 Census = 577
- 1951 Census = 640
- 1961 Census = 842
- 1966 Census = 845
- 1971 Census = 1098
- 1981 Census- 1225
- 1991 Census= 1246
- 2001 Census= 1542
- 2008 Estimate = 1860
- 2011 Census = 1892
- 2021 Census = 1997

== People ==
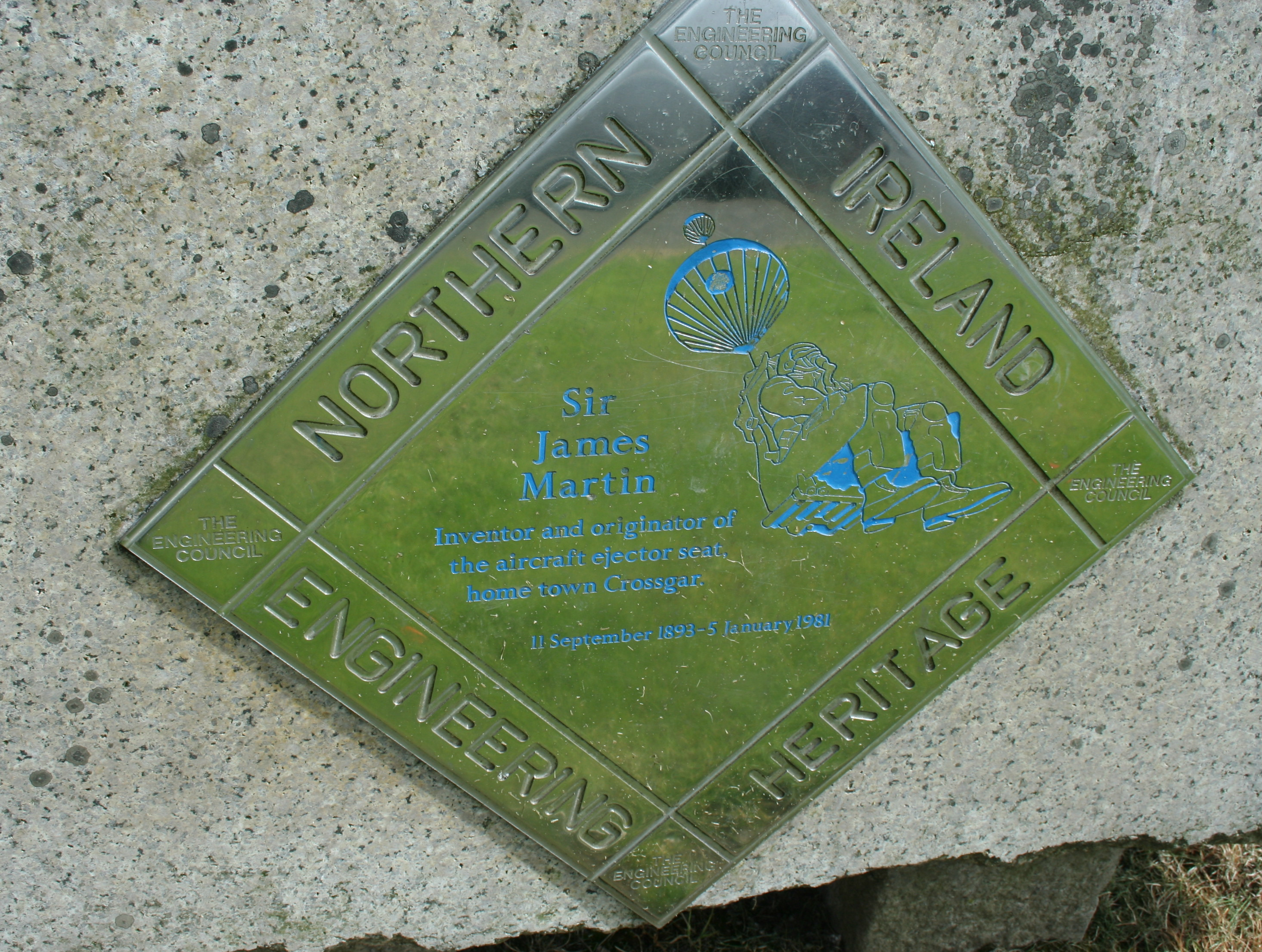
Plaque to Sir James Martin, inventor

- Jim Allister, leader of the Traditional Unionist Voice (TUV) party and former senior barrister, was born in Crossgar in 1953.
- Sir James Martin OBE, inventor of the ejector seat, was born in the nearby townland of Killinchy-in-the-Woods in 1893. He is also co-founder of the Martin-Baker Aircraft Company. A stone has been erected in his memory in Crossgar Square.
- Dermot Nesbitt, the former NI Environment Minister and a UUP MLA was born in Crossgar and still lives there
- Footballer Andrew Waterworth is from Crossgar, as is his grandfather; former Glentoran defender and captain Noel McCarthy. Andrew played for Hamilton Academical Football Club in the SPL and Linfield Football Club but now plays for Glenavon.

== Sport ==
Crossgar is home of Kilmore Rec. Football Club, which plays at Robert Adams Park. It is the club at which Andrew Waterworth started his career.

Crossgar hosts the badminton team and club, 'Lisara Badminton Club'. Their place of play is in Lisara Presbyterian Church Hall.

Crossgar is home to an outdoor Winter Seasonal Icehockey team called the 'Crossgar Hawks' Established in 2021.

Crossgar is also home to East Down Amateur Boxing Club Established in 2010.

Crossgar also has its own 9 hole Par 64 Golf Course, Crossgar Golf Club, located on the Derryboy Road and founded in 1993.

== Surrounding areas ==
- Kilmore
- Listooder
- Annacloy
- Bells Hill
- Derryboy

== See also ==
- Market houses in Northern Ireland

== Bibliography ==
- The Whitewashed City: the story of Crossgar, County Down by Tom Hewitt. Vol. l (Crossgar, Tom Hewitt, 2004)
