= Arthur Hill (politician) =

British soldier and Unionist politician

Major Arthur Hill (30 December 1873 – 27 June 1913) was a British soldier and Unionist politician.

A member of the Hill family headed by the Marquess of Downshire, he was the only child of Lord Arthur Hill by his first wife Annie Nisida Denham Cookes, daughter of Lieutenant-Colonel George Denham Cookes. His mother died only a few days after his birth.

Hill succeeded his father as Member of Parliament for West Down at a by-election in 1898, aged 24, and became the Baby of the House. During his seven years in Parliament, he never once spoke, and voted in only 106 divisions. He retired in 1905. In 1902 he was President of London Cabdrivers Athletic Club. Hill was also a major in the 5th Battalion of the Royal Irish Rifles and was a member of the Royal Ulster Yacht Club. He was a prominent Orangeman.

Hill married Roberta Menges, widow of Halsey Corwin, in 1908. They had no children. He died in June 1913, aged 39.

Parliament of the United Kingdom
Preceded by Lord Arthur Hill	Member of Parliament for West Down; 1898–1905	Succeeded by Harry Liddell
Preceded by Sir Samuel Scott, Bt	Baby of the House; 1898–1900	Succeeded by Richard Rigg
