= Listooder =

Coordinates: 54.4071°N 5.8092°W

Listooder: Irish: Lios an tSúdaire
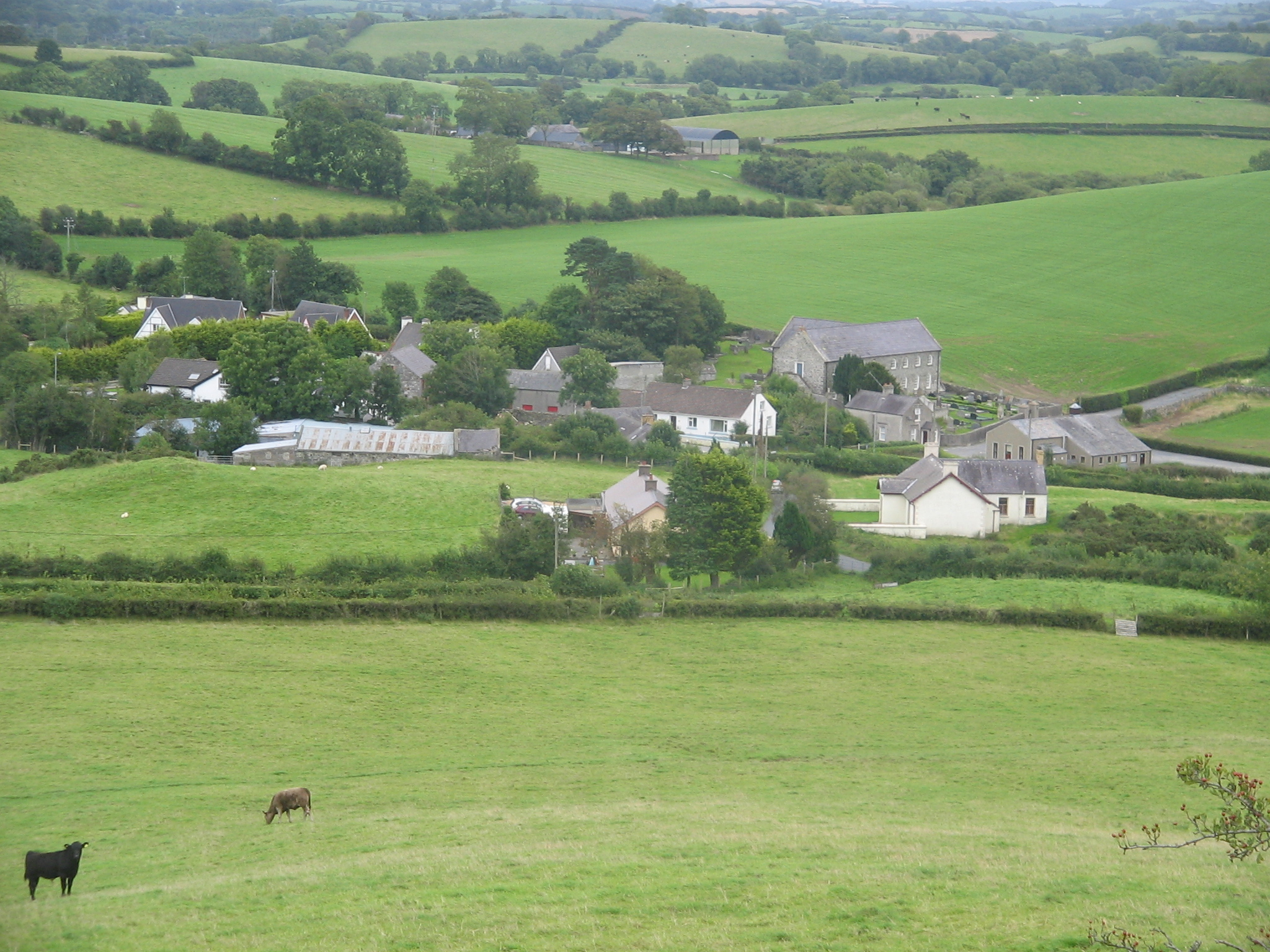
- Looking down on Listooder

- Location within County Down
- Population: 31 (2011 Census)
- District: Down
- County: County Down
- Country: Northern Ireland
- Sovereign state: United Kingdom
- Post town: DOWNPATRICK
- Postcode district: BT30
- Dialling code: 028
- Police: Northern Ireland
- Fire: Northern Ireland
- Ambulance: Northern Ireland
- UK Parliament: Strangford
- NI Assembly: Strangford

Listooder is a hamlet and townland situated outside Crossgar towards both Ballynahinch and Saintfield in County Down, Northern Ireland. Listooder derives its name from the Irish word Lios an tSúdaire meaning "fort of the leather tanner" or "ring-fort". From the mid 19th century, the hamlet was known as The Cock, while the townland which centres around the fort was called Listooder.

The hamlet has a small working farm, a missionary hall, an Orange Lodge, and a Non-Subscribing Presbyterian church. During the 19th and 20th centuries, Listooder also had a shop, public house, and a primary school. Housing has extended from the crossroads (postbox) towards Saintfield in recent decades. According to the 2011 census, there were then nine houses and 31 people living in Listooder.

== Features ==
A small river runs through Listooder which is a tributary of the Ballynahinch River, which eventually leads into the Quoile River.

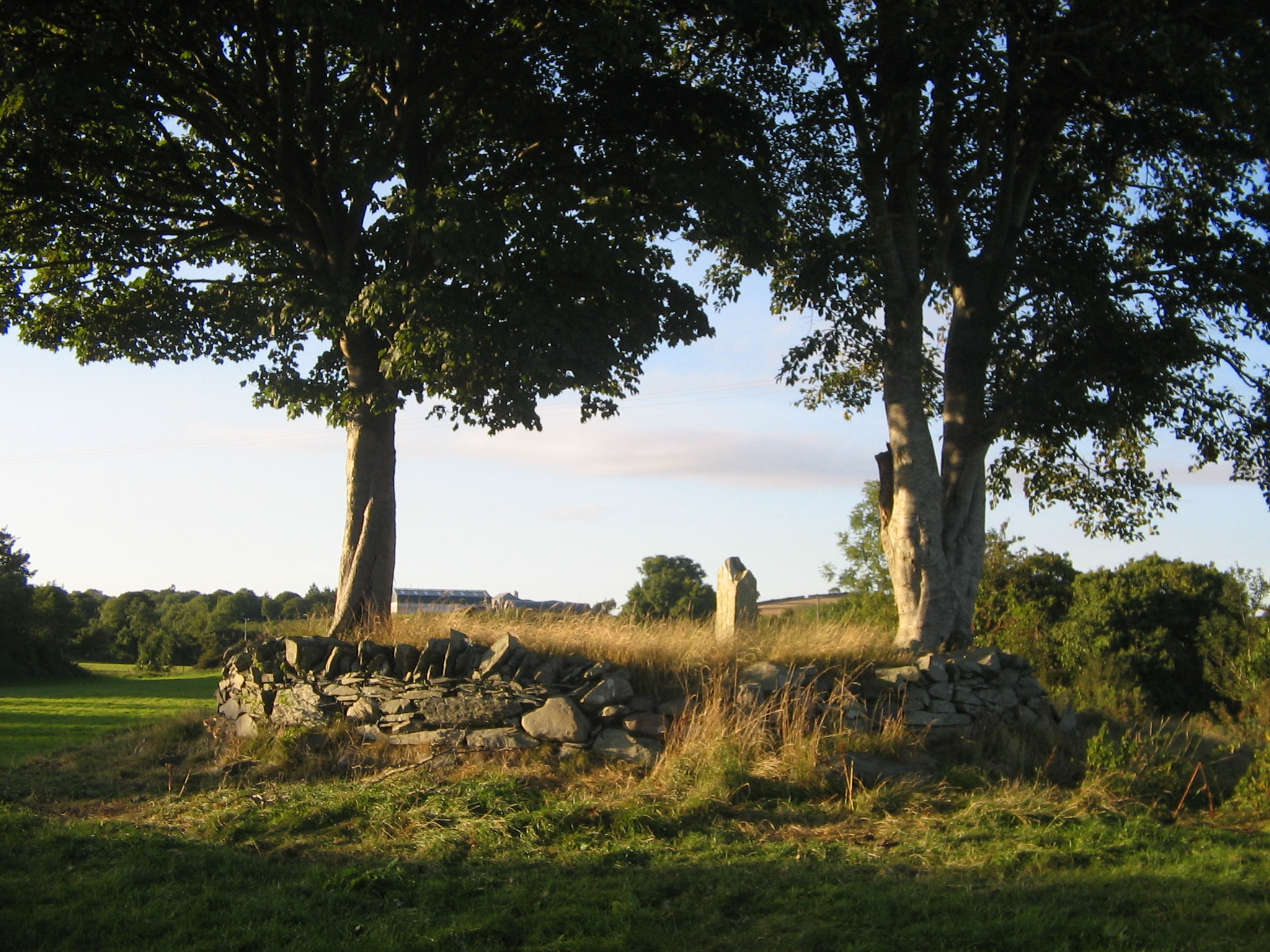
Gravestone in Listooder

Overlooking Listooder lies an old thousand-year-old rath/fort (hence lios) which sits on one of the parish's highest drumlin hills. It has a 360° view across the Down Drumlins as far as the Mourne Mountains.

Less than half a mile outside Listooder, on the border of the two townlands of Listooder and Clontaghnaglar, in a field along Abbeyview Road, sits an 18th-century priest's gravestone with a cross engraved on it and surrounded by a stone wall with a sycamore and beech tree.

On Abbeyview Road, there is also an old railway bridge that goes over the old Downpatrick-Belfast railway line that stopped functioning in 1950. During the world wars, children got off here and stayed at nearby houses for safety.

== Buildings & Societies ==
- Built in 1787, Rademon Church is the 12th oldest Non-subscribing Presbyterian Church of Ireland. The congregation was founded by 1st Saintfield in 1713 and probably met in a simple wood and thatch construction lasting about 10 years. Their second meeting house was more substantial. Remains of its walls can still be seen on the site and lasted until the present church was built. Rademon was amongst the congregations that left the main presbyterian denomination (Synod of Ulster) during the second subscription controversy in the 1820s to join the Remonstrant Synod until the NSP church was formed in 1910. Its church hall is beside it where a National School was.
- An Orange Hall can be found in the hamlet. Listooder Orange Hall was built in 1871 and its Orangemen continue to meet. The lodge used to have a loyalist flute band known as Listooder True Blues.
- Listooder Mission Hall was established in September 1964 in conjunction with Faith Mission when Fred Orr of Acre Gospel Mission in Brazil was invited by Faith Mission to bring a missionary report. The hall is still in function and holds fortnightly youth fellowship and prayer meetings.
- Listooder is home to the oldest ploughing society in Ireland and the oldest continuous ploughing society in the British Isles. Listooder & District Ploughing Society was founded by John McRoberts JP, Laird of Listooder (Rademon Mills), in 1890 and the society held its 130th annual ploughing competition in 2020.

== People ==
- Jim Allister KC, leader of the Traditional Unionist Voice and former barrister, was born near Listooder and lived there until he was 9 years old.
- George Best, the professional footballer, spent his summer holidays as a kid at his relatives' summer house in Listooder.
- Sir James Craig, first Prime Minister of Northern Ireland, was the Vice-President of Listooder and District Ploughing Society from November 1906 until November 1921 and continued to present the all-Ireland cup class in Listooder until 1926.

== Gallery ==
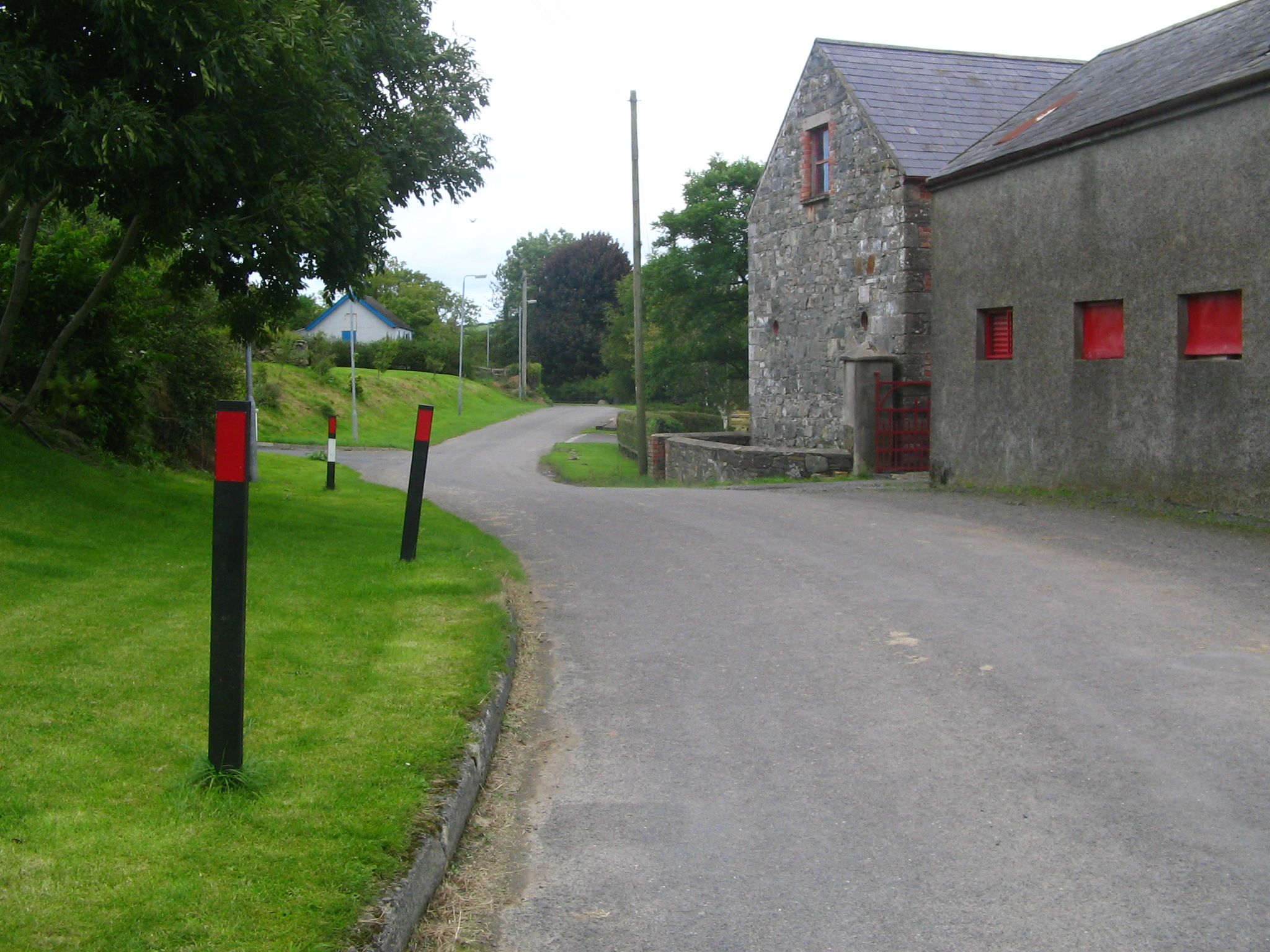
Listooder

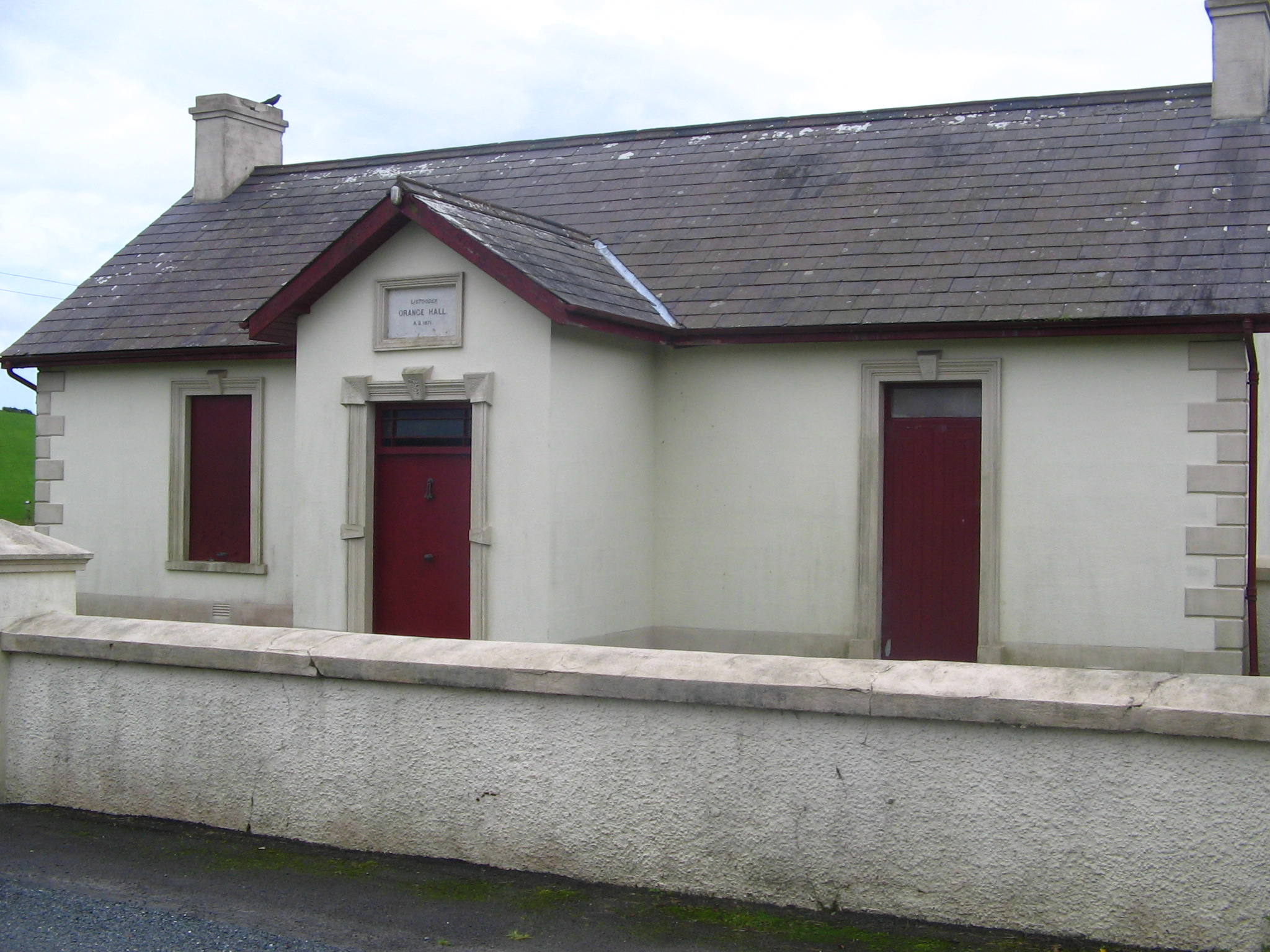
Listooder Orange Hall

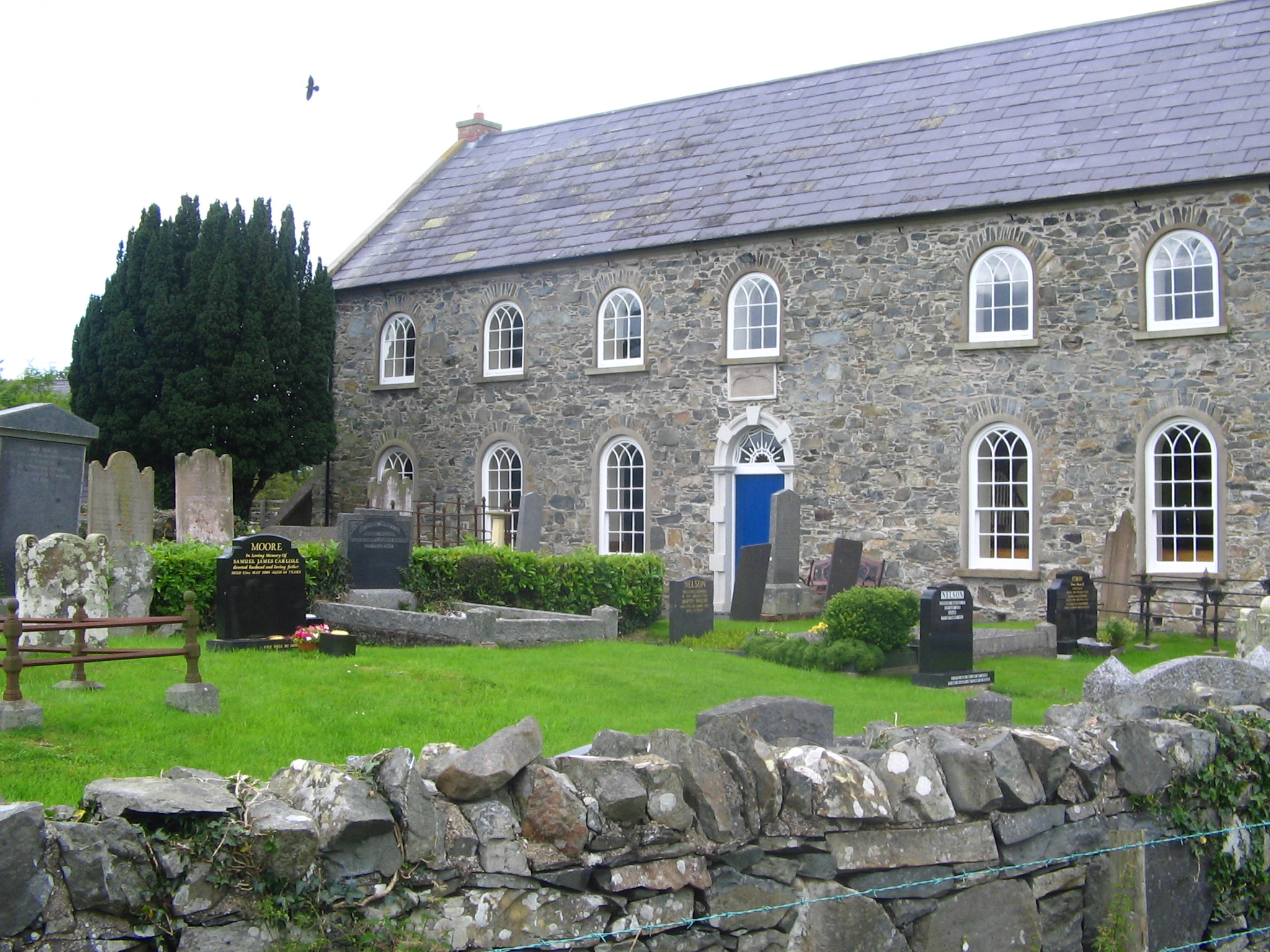
Rademon Church

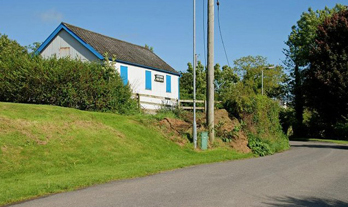
Listooder Missionary Hall
