= Thomas Browne Wallace =

Thomas Browne Wallace (1865 – 28 April 1951) was the Member of Parliament for West Down, 1921–1922.

== Life ==
He was son of Robert Smyths Wallace, of Dromore, and was admitted a solicitor in 1887. A Unionist, he was elected for West Down on 14 July 1921. He was appointed Chief Clerk of the High Court of Justice of Northern Ireland in 1922.

Parliament of the United Kingdom
| Preceded by Daniel Martin Wilson | Member of Parliament for West Down; 1921–1922 | Succeeded by Hugh Hayes |
