= Lord Arthur Hill =

Anglo-Irish soldier and Conservative politician (1846–1931)

Colonel The Right Honourable Lord Arthur Hill PC DL JP
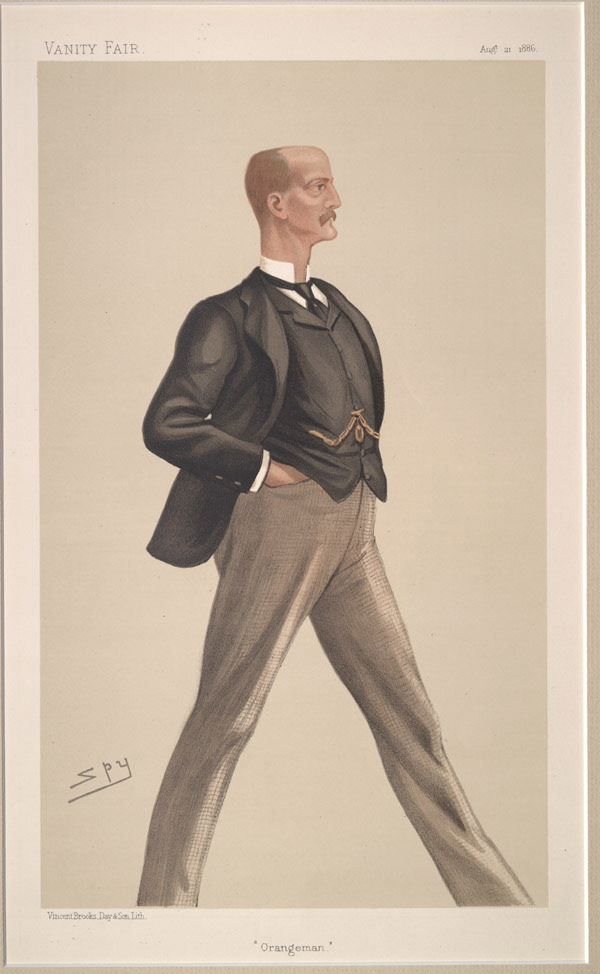
- "Orangeman". Caricature of Lord Arthur Hill by Spy published in Vanity Fair in 1886.

Comptroller of the Household
- In office 27 June 1885 – 28 January 1886
- Monarch: Victoria
- Prime Minister: The Marquess of Salisbury
- Preceded by: The Lord Kensington
- Succeeded by: Edward Marjoribanks
- In office 5 August 1886 – 11 August 1892
- Monarch: Victoria
- Prime Minister: The Marquess of Salisbury
- Preceded by: Edward Marjoribanks
- Succeeded by: George Leveson-Gower
- In office 10 July 1895 – 19 October 1898
- Monarch: Victoria
- Prime Minister: The Marquess of Salisbury
- Preceded by: George Leveson-Gower
- Succeeded by: The Viscount Valentia

Personal details
- Born: 28 July 1846
- Died: 13 January 1931 (aged 84)
- Party: Conservative
- Spouse(s): (1) Annie Cookes (d. 1874) (2) Annie Harrison (d. 1944)

Colonel Lord Arthur William Hill PC, DL, JP (28 July 1846 – 13 January 1931), was an Anglo-Irish soldier and Conservative politician. He served three times as Comptroller of the Household between 1885 and 1898 in the Conservative administrations headed by Lord Salisbury.

== Background ==
Hill was a younger son of Arthur Hill, 4th Marquess of Downshire, by his wife the Honourable Caroline Frances Stapleton-Cotton, daughter of Field Marshal Stapleton Stapleton-Cotton, 1st Viscount Combermere. Arthur Hill, 5th Marquess of Downshire, was his elder brother.

== Military career ==
Hill served as a lieutenant in the 2nd Life Guards. He was later a lieutenant-colonel in the part-time 2nd Middlesex Royal Garrison Artillery (Volunteers), and was appointed an honorary colonel of the 5th (Militia) Battalion of the Royal Irish Rifles on 5 April 1902.

== Political career ==
Hill sat as Member of Parliament for Down and subsequently for West Down from 1880 (succeeding his uncle Lord Edwin Hill-Trevor) until 1898, when he resigned from Parliament in June by becoming Steward of the Manor of Northstead. He served under Lord Salisbury as Comptroller of the Household from 1885 to 1886, from 1886 to 1892 and from 1895 to 1898. In 1885 he was sworn of the Privy Council. He again held the Down West seat briefly from 1907 to 1908. Apart from his political career he was also a Deputy Lieutenant of County Down and a Justice of the Peace for County Down and Berkshire.

== Family ==
Hill was twice married. He married firstly Annie Nisida Denham Cookes, daughter of Lieutenant-Colonel George Denham Cookes, in 1873. They had one son, Arthur Hill, who succeeded his father as MP for West Down in 1898. Lady Arthur Hill died in January 1874, shortly after the birth of her only child. Hill married as his second wife Annie Harrison, daughter of James Fortescue Harrison, MP for Kilmarnock, in 1877. They had one daughter. Hill died in January 1931, aged 84. Lady Arthur Hill died in February 1944.

Parliament of the United Kingdom
Preceded by Lord Edwin Hill-Trevor; Viscount Castlereagh	Member of Parliament for Down; 1880 – 1885; With: Viscount Castlereagh 1880–1884; Richard Ker 1884–1885	Constituency abolished
New constituency	Member of Parliament for West Down; 1885 – 1898	Succeeded by Arthur Hill
Preceded by Harry Liddell	Member of Parliament for West Down; 1907–1908	Succeeded by William MacCaw
Political offices
Preceded by The Lord Kensington	Comptroller of the Household; 1885–1886	Succeeded by Edward Marjoribanks
Preceded by Edward Marjoribanks	Comptroller of the Household; 1886–1892	Succeeded by George Leveson-Gower
Preceded by George Leveson-Gower	Comptroller of the Household; 1895–1898	Succeeded by The Viscount Valentia
