= Andrew Beattie (politician) =

Irish politician & public servant (1860–1923)

The Right Honourable Sir Andrew Beattie JP DL
- Born: 6 August 1860; Rathfriland, County Down, Ireland
- Died: 20 November 1923 (aged 63)
- Occupation: Politician

Sir Andrew Beattie JP DL (6 August 1860 – 19 November 1923) was an Irish politician and public servant.

Beattie was born in Rathfriland, County Down. For many years, both before and after the creation of the Irish Free State, he led the Unionist group on the Dublin City Council, of which he was an Alderman. He was also High Sheriff of Dublin, a Deputy Lieutenant for the City of Dublin, Commissioner of National Education for Ireland, and a Senator of the short-lived Parliament of Southern Ireland. He unsuccessfully contested the seat of West Down in the Parliament of the United Kingdom three times as an Independent Unionist.

Beattie was an advocate for professional nurses. From 1902 to 1918, he was founding chairman and trustee of the Coronation National Fund for Nurses in Ireland. This was a sub-fund of King Edward VII's Coronation Citizens' Executive Committee. The fund sought to support nurses in "sickness, adversity, or old age". Nurses could join by subscription, which in 1907 was 5 shillings per year, applying for funds when needed. From 1917, Beattie attended monthly meetings of the Irish Board of the newly formed College of Nursing, later the Royal College of Nursing, as their honorary treasurer. He sat as one of the Irish Board delegates on the College Council in London from 1917 until his death in 1923.

Beattie stood for election to the 4th Dáil in the 1923 general election as an Independent candidate in Dublin South. He failed to win the election by a margin of 490 votes less than the anti-Treaty Sinn Féin candidate Charles Murphy.

He was the most prominent Presbyterian politician in Dublin and was a member of Ormond Quay Presbyterian Church.

He was knighted in the 1920 New Year Honours for his services to Dublin and was appointed to the Privy Council of Ireland in the 1921 New Year Honours, entitling him to the style "The Right Honourable".
