= 1899 Dublin Corporation election =

1899 municipal election in Dublin, Ireland

- 16 January 1899

All 60 seats to Dublin Corporation 31 seats needed for a majority
	First party	Second party
Party	United Irish League	Irish National League
Seats won	27	18
	Third party	Fourth party
Party	LEA	Irish Unionist
Seats won	8	7
- Map showing results by ward.
Council control before election
Redmondites
Council control after election
No Overall Control

An election to Dublin Corporation took place in January 1899 as part of that year's Irish local elections.

Before the next regular local elections, the jurisdiction of the city of Dublin was expanded under the Dublin Corporation Act 1900 (63 & 64 Vict. c. cclxiv). Elections were held for 20 additional seats in this area at the 1901 Dublin Corporation election.

== Background ==
The election, being the first following the 1898 changes to Irish local government, saw substantive changes to the franchise. Prior to these changes, the franchise had been restricted to males over the age of 21 who had maintained a continual residence within the borough for the preceding 2 years and 8 months, thereby preventing Dublin's large lodger and floating tenement population from voting. As a result of the changes the franchise increased from 7,964 in the previous elections to 38,719. Among these voters were 6,500 women who could vote for the first time.

== Contest ==
The 60 seats for election were contested by 120 candidates; 18 Unionists, 10 Labourites, 88 Nationalists, and 1 representative of the Irish Socialist Republican Party.

The election was characterised by the divide among Nationalist voters. Redmondite candidates, including Lord Mayor Daniel Tallon and Nationalist member of parliament William Redmond, criticised some nationalist members of the council for voting for the Unionist candidate, Robert Sexton, for Lord Mayor. An Anti-Redmondite ticket led by Alderman Thomas D. Pile opposed the Redmondites, although some candidates were nominated by both tickets.

This was the first time representatives of organised Labour participated in their own right, fighting under the banner of the Labour Electoral Association. Previously the Labour interest had been represented by Nationalist "Labour" spokespersons. That being said, the party only contested 10 of Dublins 60 seats, meaning the party did not even put forward 1 candidate per ward. Some of the party's candidates were additionally nominated by one of the nationalist tickets.

== Results ==
The election saw the Redmondites, who had previously dominated the council, substantially reduced. The Redmondites had previously held 44 of the 60 seats in the old council. Following the election the Redmondites held only 18. United Irish League representation increased substantially to 27. Labour representation increased from 3 to 8, whilst Unionist representation declined to 7.

=== Results by party ===
Party	Seats	±	Votes	T %	±%
Anti-Redmondite	27				
Irish National League	18				
LEA	8				
Irish Unionist	7				
Totals	60			100%	—

== Results by ward ==
*: Incumbent councillor.
**: Incumbent alderman.
A: Elected alderman.

=== Arran Quay Ward ===
Arran Quay Ward Electorate: 4,236
Party	Candidate	Votes	%	±%
Anti-Redmondite	James Cummins	1,523		
Irish National League	John Keogh	1,209		
Anti-Redmondite	Richard Jones	865		
Irish National League	William Coffey	830		
Irish Unionist	James Crozier	782		
Anti-Redmondite	Patrick Monks	782		
Anti-Redmondite	Lawrence Mulligan	773		
LEA (Anti-Redmondite)	George Leahy	756		
Irish National League	Francis Keegan	734		
Turnout		2,965		

=== Fitzwilliam Ward ===
Fitzwilliam Ward Electorate: 2,083
Party	Candidate	Votes	%	±%
Irish Unionist	William Ireland	718		
Irish Unionist	Thomas Anthony Joynt	676		
Anti-Redmondite	Thomas Pile	653		
Anti-Redmondite	Patrick W. Corrigan	622		
Irish National League	Joseph Delahunt	558		
Anti-Redmondite	Joseph Hatch	540		
Anti-Redmondite	Thomas Kennedy	520		
Irish National League	Philip Redmond	344		
Irish National League	William Cashen	320		
Irish National League	James Brooks	297		
Turnout		1,686		

=== Inns Quay Ward ===
Inns Quay Ward Electorate: 3,768
Party	Candidate	Votes	%	±%
Anti-Redmondite	Thomas Lenehan	1,493		
Anti-Redmondite	Joseph Downes	1,263		
Anti-Redmondite	E. L. Richardson	1,071		
Anti-Redmondite	T. J. O'Neill	1,037		
Irish National League	Michael Doyle	797		
Irish National League	Laurence O'Rourke	719		
Irish National League	James Hopkins	508		
Irish Unionist	Loftus J. Nuzum	233		
Turnout		2,301		

=== Mansion House Ward ===
Mansion House Ward Electorate: 1,558
Party	Candidate	Votes	%	±%
LEA (Irish National League)	Patrick Dowd	749		
Irish National League	Thomas Kelly	748		
Irish National League	Daniel Tallon	741		
Anti-Redmondite	Philip Little	730		
Irish Unionist	Henry Cochrane	438		
Irish Unionist	Robert Mitchell	341		
Independent	Augustine Bonham	139		
Turnout				

=== Merchants' Quay Ward ===
Merchants' Quay Ward Electorate: 3,682
Party	Candidate	Votes	%	±%
Anti-Redmondite	John Keogh Hendrick	1,237		
Irish National League	John Park Cox	1,073		
Anti-Redmondite	Michael McGovern	1,039		
Irish National League	James Hutchinson	775		
Irish National League	Robert O'Reilly	681		
LEA (Anti-Redmondite)	John Simmons	604		
Irish National League	James Vaughan	553		
Irish Unionist	John Stewart Goodfellow	243		
Ind. Nationalist	Albert L. Altman	158		
Turnout				

=== Mountjoy Ward ===
Mountjoy Ward Electorate: 3,269
Party	Candidate	Votes	%	±%
Anti-Redmondite	John J. Farrell	952		
LEA	Joseph Clarke	894		
Ind. Nationalist	William J. Leahy	657		
Irish National League	John Kennedy	619		
Irish National League	Thomas Sherlock	608		
Irish National League	William Buckley	564		
Independent	Thomas J. O'Reilly	391		
Irish Unionist	Francis Donaldson	253		
Irish Unionist	Andrew W. Noble	222		
Independent	Thomas Fanning	76		
Turnout		1,821		

=== North City Ward ===
North City Ward Electorate: 1,814
Party	Candidate	Votes	%	±%
Irish National League	James Hennessy	752		
Irish National League	Patrick White	653		
Irish National League	John Long	639		
LEA (Irish National League)	Michael Canty	605		
Anti-Redmondite	Joseph F. McCarthy	503		
Anti-Redmondite	Christopher Grimes	470		
Anti-Redmondite	John Irwin	415		
Anti-Redmondite	Michael Rowan	406		
Turnout				

=== North Dock Ward ===
North Dock Ward Electorate: 3,850
Party	Candidate	Votes	%	±%
LEA	Edward Fleming	732		
Ind. Nationalist	Timothy Harrington	723		
Irish National League	Edward Holohan	639		
Irish National League	Daniel J. Bergin	613		
Irish National League	P.J. McCabe	592		
Irish Socialist Republican	E.W. Stewart	468		
Turnout				

=== Rotunda Ward ===
Rotunda Ward Electorate: 2,093
Party	Candidate	Votes	%	±%
LEA	William Doyle	823		
Anti-Redmondite	Joseph Nannetti	810		
Irish National League	Hugh B. Kennedy	754		
Ind. Nationalist	Peter O'Hara	726		
Irish National League	Thomas McAuley	687		
Irish National League	James Brangan	530		
Irish National League	Joseph Bonass	267		
Ind. Nationalist	Thomas Galloway Rigg	28		
Turnout				

=== Royal Exchange Ward ===
Royal Exchange Ward Electorate: 1,291
Party	Candidate	Votes	%	±%
Irish Nationalist	William Russell	510		
Irish Nationalist	Michael Murray	420		
Irish Unionist	Andrew Beattie	412		
Irish Nationalist	James Brady	409		
Irish Nationalist	John Gibson Moore	398		
Irish Unionist	A. G. Thornton	385		
Irish Unionist	George Thompson	370		
Irish Unionist	J. G. McEntaggart	356		
Turnout				

=== South City Ward ===
South City Ward Electorate: 1,108
Party	Candidate	Votes	%	±%
Irish Unionist	Robert Sexton	451		
Irish Unionist	Henry Brown	375		
Irish Unionist	George Healy	395		
Irish Unionist	George Macnie	378		
Independent	Joseph J. Goggins	209		
Ind. Nationalist	Thomas Read	113		
Independent	R. H. Davis	102		
Ind. Unionist	John A. Walker	62		
Turnout		705	63.63	

=== South Dock Ward ===
South Dock Ward Electorate: 2,088
Party	Candidate	Votes	%	±%
Ind. Nationalist	William Francis Cotton	1,121		
Irish National League	Daniel Burke	748		
Irish National League	John Clancy	696		
Irish National League	J. J. O'Meara	663		
Irish National League	Joseph P. Camac	643		
Ind. Unionist	John Latimer	248		
Turnout		705		

=== Trinity Ward ===
Trinity Ward Electorate: 2,241
Party	Candidate	Votes	%	±%
Irish National League	Joseph Meade	932		
Irish National League	Laurence Doyle	729		
Irish National League	Gerald O'Reilly	635		
Irish National League	J. Philip Meagher	591		
LEA (Anti-Redmondite)	Alexander Blane	537		
Irish Unionist	John Byrne	203		
Turnout				

=== Usher's Quay Ward ===
Usher's Quay Ward Electorate: 3,367
Party	Candidate	Votes	%	±%
Anti-Redmondite	Michael Flanagan	1,060		
Irish National League	William Redmond	1,035		
Anti-Redmondite	Bernard Gorevan	933		
LEA	John Gibbons	673		
Irish National League	John Noonan	646		
Anti-Redmondite	Hugh Doyle	643		
Irish National League	Ambrose Walsh	560		
Anti-Redmondite	William H. Beardwood	434		
Ind. Nationalist	Albert L. Altman	127		
Turnout				

=== Wood Quay Ward ===
Wood Quay Ward Electorate: 3,286
Party	Candidate	Votes	%	±%
Anti-Redmondite	John J. Davin	1,368		
Anti-Redmondite	Patrick Joseph McCall	1,345		
Anti-Redmondite	Michael G. Kernan	1,278		
Anti-Redmondite	Reuben Dodd	1,266		
Ind. Unionist	John Keys	1,099		
Ind. Nationalist	Laurence Jackson (withdrawn)	151		
Turnout		2,375		
