= 1904 Dublin St Stephen's Green by-election =

UK Parliamentary by-election

The 1904 Dublin St Stephen's Green by-election was held on 21 March 1904 following the death of the incumbent Irish Parliamentary Party MP, James Cann on 14 February.

== Candidates ==
The Unionist candidate was Charles Louis Matheson, a lawyer. He was selected by the City of Dublin Unionist Registration Association when the prospective candidate, Norris Goddard, withdrew as he was ineligible to stand. A potential opponent, M. J. F. McCarthy, withdrew from the contest for the nomination.

Matheson would go on to become a serjeant-at-law in 1911 and Recorder of Belfast in 1913.

The Irish Parliamentary Party candidate was Laurence Ambrose Waldron, a stockbroker.

== Unionist campaign ==
'[This] by-election ... revealed how deep the divisions in unionist ranks ran, but it was also a harbinger of the future. Senior figures within the Unionist Party were not inclined to contest the seat, especially as the new nationalist-backed ‘independent’ candidate, Laurence Waldron, was a stockbroker and former unionist who would be a moderating influence in the House of Commons. Several leading business figures, including Sir William Goulding, chairman of the Great Southern and Western Railway, and Lord Iveagh, head of the Guinness dynasty, resigned from the Unionist Representative Association in protest at a grass-roots revolt that led to the association supporting the candidacy of Norris Goddard, a Crown solicitor. It was a foolish nomination, as Goddard could stand only by relinquishing his lucrative government post, which he declined to do. The former Unionist MP for the constituency, James Campbell KC, was available to stand and had the added advantage of being wealthy enough to finance his own campaign, but the Unionist Representative Association would not have him. There followed an unseemly row about the rival candidacies of another lawyer, C. L. Matheson, and Michael McCarthy, a colourful renegade nationalist from Cork who was popular with militant unionists because of his books denouncing the evils of Catholicism. Matheson secured the nomination but, as expected, was defeated by Waldron.'

== Result ==
1904 Dublin St Stephen's Green by-election
| Party | Candidate | Votes | % | ±% |
|---|---|---|---|---|
| Irish Parliamentary | Laurence Ambrose Waldron | 3,457 | 55.1 | ▲0.7 |
| Irish Unionist | Charles Louis Matheson | 2,821 | 44.9 | ▼0.7 |
| Majority | | 636 | 10.2 | ▲1.4 |
| Turnout | | 6,278 | 78.3 | ▲6.0 |
| Registered electors | | 8,018 | | |
| Irish Parliamentary hold | | Swing | ▲0.7 | |
