= Edward Litton =

Edward Litton may refer to:

- Edward Litton (1787–1870), Irish Member of Parliament (MP) for Coleraine 1837–1843
- Edward Falconer Litton (1827–1890), Irish Member of Parliament for Tyrone 1880–1841
- Ed Litton (Harry Edward Litton Jr., born 1959), president of the Southern Baptist Convention 2021-
