= 1901 Dublin Corporation election =

1901 municipal election in Dublin, Ireland

← 1899	January 1901	1902 →

20 seats added to Dublin Corporation

The 1901 Dublin Corporation election took place in January 1901 in five wards added to Dublin city under the Dublin Corporation Act 1900 (63 & 64 Vict. c. cclxiv). The twenty councillors elected to these seats sat in addition to the sixty who had been elected in 1899, bringing the council size to 80.

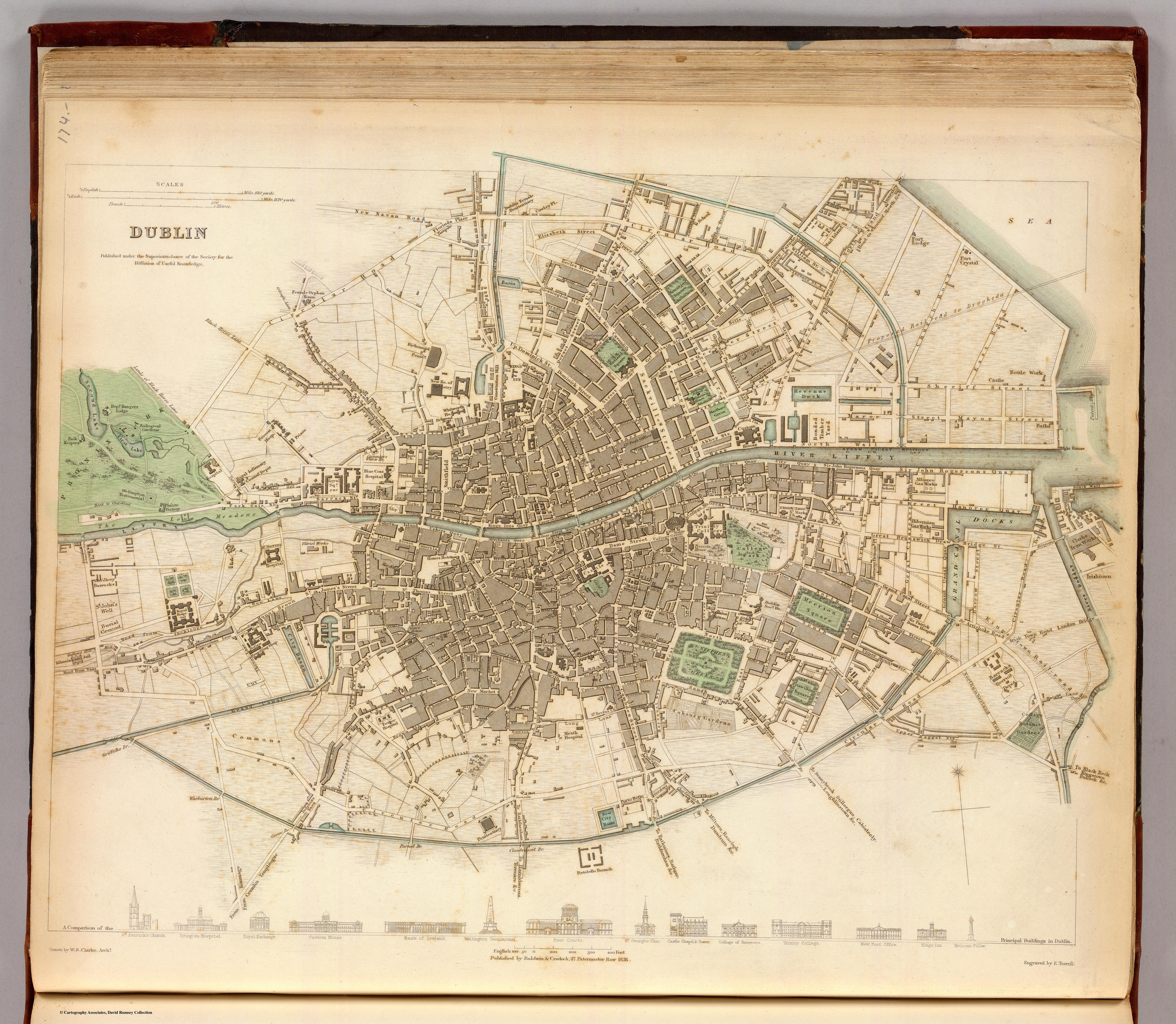
Map of the area contained by the unreformed municipal boundaries.

At the time of the 1899 election, Dublin council at the time was composed of 60 members, and was still restricted in area to its historic boundaries, contained to the south by the Grand Canal. This was despite the fact that proposals for extending the municipal borough had existed since the 1880s, in part to deal with the issue whereby residents of the Dublin suburbs had access to and benefited from city services, but were not subject to Dublin municipal taxation. By 1899 Dublin was the only major city in the United Kingdom which had not seen an expansion of its municipal boundaries.

A private members bill was raised in parliament, proposing to extend Dublin's municipal boundaries to include several neighboring townships, and was fiercely opposed by Irish Unionists, although the incumbent Conservative government took a neutral position. The majority of councillors for the townships, who were also Unionists, opposed the plan, and several petitions opposed to the plan were submitted to parliament. Ultimately a deal was made whereby Clontarf, Drumcondra, Clonliffe and Glasnevin, and New Kilmainham, and some county land was added to the borough, although the more populous southern townships of Pembroke and Rathmines and Rathgar were not.

This resulted in the creation of some 5 extra wards, and the total number of councillors was increased to 80. Twenty new members were thus elected in January 1901, of whom 9 were Unionists, thereby bringing Unionist representation up to 16. This meant that by January 1901 Unionists were returned to the 20% representation they enjoyed prior to 1899.
