= James McCann (St Stephen's Green MP) =

Irish businessman & politician (1840–1904)

James McCann (1840 – 14 February 1904) was an Irish businessman and politician.

He was a successful stockbroker, before buying the old Russell Estate at Ardsallagh, County Meath. He set up a number of business including a bacon factory and a furniture factory.

He was an MP, representing the Irish Parliamentary Party, for Dublin St Stephen's Green, from 1900 until his death in office in February 1904. The by-election for the seat was won by Laurence Ambrose Waldron of the Irish Parliamentary Party.

Parliament of the United Kingdom
Preceded by James Campbell	Member of Parliament for Dublin St Stephen's Green; 1900 – 1904	Succeeded by Laurence Ambrose Waldron
