= P. J. Brady =

Irish politician (1868–1943)

Senator
- In office 26 January 1927 – 12 December 1928

Member of Parliament for Dublin St Stephen's Green
- In office January 1910 – 25 November 1918
- Preceded by: Laurence A. Waldron
- Succeeded by: Thomas Kelly

Personal details
- Born: 1868 Blackrock, Dublin, Ireland
- Died: 20 May 1943 (aged 75) Booterstown, Dublin, Ireland
- Party: Independent (1922–1943); Nationalist/IPP (until 1922)
- Spouse: Evelyn Parminter (m. 1900; died 1931)
- Education: University College Dublin
- Occupation: Solicitor; politician

Patrick Joseph Brady (1868 – 20 May 1943) was an Irish nationalist MP for Dublin St Stephen's Green constituency from 1910 to 1918, during the closing years of the Irish Parliamentary Party's dominance of Irish politics. Later, he was a Senator of the Irish Free State from 1927 to 1928. He was one of the few parliamentarians who served in both the House of Commons and in the Oireachtas.

The eldest son of James Brady, he was born at Blackrock, Dublin and educated at St Vincent's College, Castleknock and at University College Dublin. He was admitted a solicitor in 1893 and became senior partner, then head of the firm of Brady & Hayden. He built up an extensive legal practice and became a member of the Council, and later President, of the Incorporated Law Society of Ireland. He was also a director of the Hibernian Bank and of the Great Southern Railways, and an active social welfare worker and member of the Catholic Society of Saint Vincent de Paul. In 1900 he married Evelyn Parminter, youngest daughter of John Douglas Parminter, a Paymaster in the Royal Navy. She died in 1931. They had no children.

Brady was a member of Blackrock Urban District Council and was subsequently elected as MP for Dublin St Stephen's Green at the general election of January 1910. St Stephen's Green was not a safe seat for the Nationalists, being won by a Liberal, Liberal Unionist or Unionist in all five elections held between 1888 and 1898. In January 1910 Brady defeated the Unionist candidate Henry O’Connor by 3,683 to 3,021. At the second 1910 general election in December, he defeated a fresh Unionist candidate, Reginald Herbert, by the bigger margin of 3,594 to 2,765. In 1918, however, the seat went to the Sinn Féin candidate Thomas Kelly, who won 8,461 votes to Brady's 2,902 and the Unionist's 2,755. Politically, Brady was described by Patrick Maume (1999) as a conservative who took a pro-employer stance in the 1913 Dublin lock-out led by James Larkin.

After the foundation of the Irish Free State in 1922, Brady served as a member of the advisory committee set up to frame the new courts system and Free State judiciary, resulting in the Courts of Justice Act 1924. On 26 January 1927 he was elected in a by-election to a vacancy in Seanad Éireann, but was defeated at the regular election of December 1928.

Among those who attended his funeral at the Church of the Assumption, Booterstown, Dublin in May 1943 was his former opponent Éamon de Valera, by that time Taoiseach.

== Sources ==
- Hansard 1803–2005: contributions in Parliament by Patrick Brady
- Dods Parliamentary Companion for 1912, London, Whittaker & Co.
- Irish Independent, 21 and 24 May 1943
- Patrick Maume, The Long Gestation: Irish Nationalist Life 1891–1918, Dublin, Gill & MacMillan, 1999
- Brian M. Walker (ed.), Parliamentary Election Results in Ireland, 1801–1922, Dublin, Royal Irish Academy, 1978
- Who Was Who, 1941–1950

Parliament of the United Kingdom
Preceded by Laurence Ambrose Waldron	Member of Parliament for Dublin St Stephen's Green; 1910–1918	Succeeded by Thomas Kelly
