= John Ellison-Macartney =

John William Ellison-Macartney (1818 – 13 February 1904), born John William Ellison, was a barrister and Irish Conservative Party politician elected to the House of Commons of the United Kingdom of Great Britain and Ireland. From 1874 to 1885, he was Member of Parliament (MP) for County Tyrone.

Ellison-Macartney was called to the bar in 1846, and to the Irish Bar in 1848. In 1870, he was High Sheriff of County Armagh.

Ellison-Macartney first stood for Parliament at the Tyrone by-election in 1873 after the death of Henry T. Lowry-Corry. He narrowly lost that contest (by 3,103 votes to 3,139) to his sole opponent, the Conservative Henry W. Lowry-Corry (a nephew of the deceased MP); the Liberals had not fielded a candidate in Tyrone since 1852. At the 1874 general election, Tyrone's two seats were contested by three Conservatives, and Ellison-Macartney topped the poll by a wide margin, unseating the sitting MP Lord Claud Hamilton. He was re-elected in 1880, and held the seat until the Redistribution of Seats Act divided the Tyrone constituency into four new single-member divisions for the 1885 general election. He did not stand again. He was also a member of The Apprentice Boys of Derry Parent Club.

== Family ==
Born John William Ellison, he changed the family surname to Ellison-Macartney by Royal Licence of 4 April 1859, following the death of his maternal uncle the Rev. William George Macartney (grandson of William Macartney MP).

His son William (1852–1924) was MP for South Antrim from 1885 to 1903, a founder of the Irish Unionist Party, Governor of Tasmania from 1913 to 1917, and Governor of Western Australia from 1917 to 1920.

== Arms ==
Coat of arms of John Ellison-Macartney

Notes
Granted 23 April 1859 by Sir John Berard Burke, Ulster King of Arms.
Crest
1st a cubit arm erect the hand grasping a rose branch in flower all Proper beneath an escroll inscribed "Simulat Sed Ornat" (Macartney) 2nd a buck's head erased Proper charged on the neck with a trefoil slipped Vert (Ellison).
Escutcheon
Quarterly 1st & 4th Or a buck trippant Gules within a bordure of the last (Macartney) 2nd & 3rd Gules on a chevron between three eagle's heads erased Argent a trefoil slipped Vert (Ellison).
Motto
Spe Gaudeo

Parliament of the United Kingdom
Preceded by Henry W. Lowry-Corry; Lord Claud Hamilton	Member of Parliament for County Tyrone; 1874 – 1885; With: Henry W. Lowry-Corry 1873–1880; Edward Falconer Litton 1880–1881; Thomas Alexander Dickson 1881–1885	Constituency abolished
