= County Tyrone (UK Parliament constituency) =

UK parliamentary constituency in Ireland, 1801–1885

- Former county constituency for the House of Commons
- County: County Tyrone

1801–1885
- Seats: 2
- Created from: County Tyrone (IHC)
- Replaced by: East Tyrone; Mid Tyrone; North Tyrone; South Tyrone

County Tyrone was a parliamentary constituency of the House of Commons of the Parliament of the United Kingdom from 1801 to 1885. It returned two Members of Parliament (MPs).

== Boundaries ==
This constituency comprised the whole of County Tyrone, except the parliamentary borough of Dungannon.

It returned two MPs from 1801 to 1885. It was an original constituency represented in Parliament when the Union of Great Britain and Ireland was created on 1 January 1801.

In the redistribution, which took effect in 1885, County Tyrone was divided into four single-member constituencies: East Tyrone, Mid Tyrone, North Tyrone and South Tyrone.

== Politics ==
The constituency electorate was predominantly Tory/Conservative during most of this period.

Catholics were excluded from taking seats in Parliament until 1829 and there was a restrictive property based franchise. It was not until the electoral reforms which took effect in 1885 that most adult males became voters. See Catholic emancipation for further details.

In these circumstances most MPs came from a limited number of Protestant aristocratic and gentry families. There were few contested elections.

It was only in 1880, at the end of the period when this constituency existed, that the Liberals first won a seat in the county.

== Members of Parliament ==
Election	First MP			Second MP		
Election	Name	Born	Died	Name	Born	Died
1801 co-option	Somerset Corry (Tory)	11 July 1774	18 April 1841	James Stewart (affiliation uncertain)	1742	18 January 1821
1802 by-election	Rt Hon John Stewart (Tory)	ca 1758	22 June 1825	James Stewart (affiliation uncertain)	1742	18 January 1821
1806	Hon Thomas Knox (Ind)	5 August 1754	26 April 1840	James Stewart (affiliation uncertain)	1742	18 January 1821
1812	Rt Hon John Stewart, Bt (Tory)	ca 1758	22 June 1825	Hon Thomas Knox (Tory)	19 April 1786	21 March 1858
1818	Rt Hon John Stewart, Bt (Tory)	ca 1758	22 June 1825	William Stewart (Whig)	1780	ca October 1850
1825 by-election	Rt Hon Henry Lowry-Corry (Tory, Con, Peelite)	9 March 1803	6 March 1873	William Stewart (Whig)	1780	ca October 1850
1830	Rt Hon Henry Lowry-Corry (Tory, Con, Peelite)	9 March 1803	6 March 1873	Sir Hugh Stewart, Bt (Tory)	14 May 1792	19 November 1854
1835	Rt Hon Henry Lowry-Corry (Tory, Con, Peelite)	9 March 1803	6 March 1873	Lord Claud Hamilton (Con)	27 July 1813	3 June 1884
1837	Rt Hon Henry Lowry-Corry (Tory, Con, Peelite)	9 March 1803	6 March 1873	James Alexander (Con)	27 July 1812	30 June 1855
1839 by-election	Rt Hon Henry Lowry-Corry (Tory, Con, Peelite)	9 March 1803	6 March 1873	Rt Hon Lord Claud Hamilton (Con, Peelite)	27 July 1813	3 June 1884
1847	Rt Hon Henry Lowry-Corry (Tory, Con, Peelite)	9 March 1803	6 March 1873	Rt Hon Lord Claud Hamilton (Con, Peelite)	27 July 1813	3 June 1884
1852 by-election	Rt Hon Henry Lowry-Corry (Tory, Con, Peelite)	9 March 1803	6 March 1873	Rt Hon Lord Claud Hamilton (Con, Peelite)	27 July 1813	3 June 1884
1873 by-election	Hon Henry Lowry-Corry (Con)	30 June 1845	6 May 1927	Rt Hon Lord Claud Hamilton (Con, Peelite)	27 July 1813	3 June 1884
1874	Hon Henry Lowry-Corry (Con)	30 June 1845	6 May 1927	John Ellison-Macartney (Con)	1818	13 February 1904
1880	Edward Falconer Litton (Lib)	1827	27 November 1890	John Ellison-Macartney (Con)	1818	13 February 1904
1881 by-election	Thomas Alexander Dickson (Lib)	1833	17 June 1909	John Ellison-Macartney (Con)	1818	13 February 1904
1885	Constituency partitioned into East, Mid, North and South parts by the Redistribution of Seats Act 1885.					

Notes:

- Stooks Smith does not specify any party allegiances for this constituency before 1818. This does not necessarily mean that the MPs were not associated with a Party in Parliament.
- From 1832 Lowry-Corry and Stewart are classified as Conservatives.
- In 1847 Lowry-Corry and Hamilton contested the general election as Peelite Liberal Conservatives, but were again Conservatives by 1852.

== Elections ==
The single-member elections in this constituency took place using the first past the post electoral system. Multi-member elections used the Plurality-at-large voting system.

There was no election in 1801. The representatives of the county in the former Parliament of Ireland became members of the 1st Parliament of the United Kingdom.

After 1832, when registration of voters was introduced, a turnout figure is given for contested elections. In two-member elections this is calculated by dividing the number of votes by two. To the extent that voters did not use both their votes this will be an underestimate of turnout. If the electorate figure is unknown the last known electorate figure is used to provide an estimate of turnout.

Where a party had more than one candidate in one or both of a pair of successive elections change is calculated for each individual candidate, otherwise change is based on the party vote.

=== Elections in the 1800s ===
Co-option 1 January 1801: Tyrone (2 seats)
Party	Candidate	Votes	%	±%
Non Partisan	James Stewart	Co-opted	N/A	N/A
Non Partisan	Viscount Corry	Co-opted	N/A	N/A

- Corry succeeded as 2nd Earl Belmore

By-Election 1 March 1802: Tyrone
Party	Candidate	Votes	%	±%
Non Partisan	John Stewart	Unopposed		

General election 19 July 1802: Tyrone (2 seats)
Party	Candidate	Votes	%	±%
Non Partisan	James Stewart	Unopposed		
Non Partisan	John Stewart	Unopposed		

General election 18 November 1806: Tyrone (2 seats)
Party	Candidate	Votes	%	±%
Non Partisan	James Stewart	Unopposed		
Non Partisan	Thomas Knox	Unopposed		

General election 25 May 1807: Tyrone (2 seats)
Party	Candidate	Votes	%	±%
Non Partisan	James Stewart	Unopposed		
Non Partisan	Thomas Knox	Unopposed		

=== Elections in the 1810s ===
General election 20 October 1812: Tyrone (2 seats)
Party	Candidate	Votes	%	±%
Non Partisan	Thomas Knox	Unopposed		
Non Partisan	John Stewart	Unopposed		

General election 1 July 1818: Tyrone (2 seats)
Party	Candidate	Votes	%	±%
Tory	John Stewart	Unopposed		
Whig	William Stewart	Unopposed		

=== Elections in the 1820s ===
General election 22 March 1820: Tyrone (2 seats)
Party	Candidate	Votes	%	±%
Tory	John Stewart	Unopposed		
Whig	William Stewart	Unopposed		

- Death of John Stewart

By-Election 27 June 1825: Tyrone
Party	Candidate	Votes	%	±%
Tory	Henry Lowry-Corry	Unopposed		
Tory hold				

General election 20 June 1826: Tyrone (2 seats)
Party	Candidate	Votes	%	±%
Whig	William Stewart	Unopposed		
Tory	Henry Lowry-Corry	Unopposed		

=== Elections in the 1830s ===
General election 9 August 1830: Tyrone (2 seats)
Party	Candidate	Votes	%
Tory	Henry Lowry-Corry	Unopposed	
Tory	Hugh Stewart	Unopposed	
Registered electors		773	
Tory hold			
Tory gain from Whig			

General election 14 May 1831: Tyrone (2 seats)
Party	Candidate	Votes	%
Tory	Henry Lowry-Corry	Unopposed	
Tory	Hugh Stewart	Unopposed	
Registered electors		773	
Tory hold			
Tory hold			

General election 17 December 1832: Tyrone (2 seats)
Party	Candidate	Votes	%
Tory	Hugh Stewart	Unopposed	
Tory	Henry Lowry-Corry	Unopposed	
Registered electors		1,151	
Tory hold			
Tory hold			

General election 20 January 1835: Tyrone (2 seats)
Party	Candidate	Votes	%
Conservative	Claud Hamilton	1,057	47.8
Conservative	Henry Lowry-Corry	627	28.4
Conservative	James Alexander	510	23.1
Conservative	Charles Eccles	17	0.8
Majority		117	5.3
Turnout		c. 1,106	c. 88.5
Registered electors		1,250	
Conservative hold			
Conservative hold			

General election 7 August 1837: Tyrone (2 seats)
Party	Candidate	Votes	%
Conservative	Henry Lowry-Corry	Unopposed	
Conservative	James Alexander	Unopposed	
Registered electors		2,602	
Conservative hold			
Conservative hold			

- Alexander succeeded as 3rd Earl of Caledon

By-Election 6 May 1839: Tyrone
Party	Candidate	Votes	%
Conservative	Claud Hamilton	218	72.7
Conservative	John Humphreys	81	27.0
Conservative	James Alexander Boyle	1	0.3
Majority		137	45.7
Turnout		300	c. 11.5
Registered electors		c. 2,602	
Conservative hold			

=== Elections in the 1840s ===
General election 9 July 1841: Tyrone (2 seats)
Party	Candidate	Votes	%	±%
Conservative	Henry Lowry-Corry	Unopposed		
Conservative	Claud Hamilton	Unopposed		
Registered electors		2,493		
Conservative hold				
Conservative hold				

- Appointment of Lowry Corry as Lord Commissioner of the Admiralty

By-election, 23 September 1841: Tyrone
Party	Candidate	Votes	%	±%
Conservative	Henry Lowry-Corry	Unopposed		
Conservative hold				

General election 10 August 1847: Tyrone (2 seats)
Party	Candidate	Votes	%	±%
Peelite	Henry Lowry-Corry	Unopposed		
Peelite	Claud Hamilton	Unopposed		
Registered electors		5,026		
Peelite gain from Conservative				
Peelite gain from Conservative				

=== Elections in the 1850s ===
- Appointment of Hamilton as Treasurer of the Household

By-election, 12 March 1852: Tyrone
Party	Candidate	Votes	%	±%
Conservative	Claud Hamilton	Unopposed		
Conservative gain from Peelite				

General election 29 July 1852: Tyrone (2 seats)
Party	Candidate	Votes	%	±%
Conservative	Henry Lowry-Corry	3,271	43.8	N/A
Conservative	Claud Hamilton	3,221	43.1	N/A
Whig	Hugh Brabazon Higgins	982	13.1	N/A
Majority		2,239	30.0	N/A
Turnout		4,228 (est)	74.3 (est)	N/A
Registered electors		5,692		
Conservative gain from Peelite		Swing	N/A	
Conservative gain from Peelite		Swing	N/A	

General election, 4 April 1857: Tyrone (2 seats)
Party	Candidate	Votes	%	±%
Conservative	Henry Lowry-Corry	Unopposed		
Conservative	Claud Hamilton	Unopposed		
Registered electors		7,393		
Conservative hold				
Conservative hold				

- Appointment of Hamilton as Treasurer of the Household

By-election, 11 March 1858: Tyrone
Party	Candidate	Votes	%	±%
Conservative	Claud Hamilton	Unopposed		
Conservative hold				

General election 10 May 1859: Tyrone (2 seats)
Party	Candidate	Votes	%	±%
Conservative	Henry Lowry-Corry	Unopposed		
Conservative	Claud Hamilton	Unopposed		
Registered electors		7,592		
Conservative hold				
Conservative hold				

=== Elections in the 1860s ===
General election 18 July 1865: Tyrone (2 seats)
Party	Candidate	Votes	%	±%
Conservative	Henry Lowry-Corry	Unopposed		
Conservative	Claud Hamilton	Unopposed		
Registered electors		8,421		
Conservative hold				
Conservative hold				

- Appointment of Lowry-Corry as Vice-President of the Committee of the Council for Education

By-Election 18 July 1866: Tyrone
Party	Candidate	Votes	%	±%
Conservative	Henry Lowry-Corry	Unopposed		
Registered electors		8,421		
Conservative hold				

- Appointment of Hamilton as Vice-Chamberlain of the Household

By-Election 20 July 1866: Tyrone
Party	Candidate	Votes	%	±%
Conservative	Claud Hamilton	Unopposed		
Registered electors		8,421		
Conservative hold				

- Appointment of Lowry-Corry as First Lord of the Admiralty

By-Election 21 March 1867: Tyrone
Party	Candidate	Votes	%	±%
Conservative	Henry Lowry-Corry	Unopposed		
Conservative hold				

General election 24 November 1868: Tyrone (2 seats)
Party	Candidate	Votes	%	±%
Conservative	Henry Lowry-Corry	Unopposed		
Conservative	Claud Hamilton	Unopposed		
Registered electors		8,878		
Conservative hold				
Conservative hold				

=== Elections in the 1870s ===
- Death of Lowry Corry

By-election, 16 April 1873: Tyrone
Party	Candidate	Votes	%	±%
Conservative	Henry Lowry-Corry	3,139	50.3	N/A
Conservative	John Ellison-Macartney	3,103	49.7	N/A
Majority		36	0.6	N/A
Turnout		6,242	72.2	N/A
Registered electors		8,643		
Conservative hold		Swing	N/A	

General election 11 February 1874: Tyrone (2 seats)
Party	Candidate	Votes	%	±%
Conservative	John Ellison-Macartney	4,710	44.3	N/A
Conservative	Henry Lowry-Corry	3,171	29.8	N/A
Conservative	Claud Hamilton	2,752	25.9	N/A
Majority		419	3.9	N/A
Turnout		5,317 (est)	59.9 (est)	N/A
Registered electors		8,883		
Conservative hold		Swing	N/A	
Conservative hold		Swing	N/A	

=== Elections in the 1880s ===
General election 8 April 1880: Tyrone (2 seats)
Party	Candidate	Votes	%	±%
Conservative	John Ellison-Macartney	3,829	35.4	−8.9
Liberal	Edward Falconer Litton	3,511	32.5	New
Conservative	Claud Hamilton	3,470	32.1	+6.2
Turnout		7,161 (est)	81.7 (est)	+21.8
Registered electors		8,762		
Majority		318	2.9	−1.0
Conservative hold		Swing	N/A	
Majority		41	0.4	N/A
Liberal gain from Conservative		Swing	N/A	

- Litton appointed Land Commissioner

By-election 7 September 1881: Tyrone
Party	Candidate	Votes	%	±%
Liberal	Thomas Alexander Dickson	3,168	44.3	+11.8
Conservative	William Knox	3,084	43.1	−24.4
Home Rule	Harold Rylett	907	12.7	New
Majority		84	1.2	+0.8
Turnout		7,159	82.5	+0.8
Registered electors		8,674		
Liberal hold		Swing	+18.1	

== Sources ==
- The Parliaments of England by Henry Stooks Smith (1st edition published in three volumes 1844–50), 2nd edition edited (in one volume) by F.W.S. Craig (Political Reference Publications 1973)
- Walker, Brian M., ed. (1978). Parliamentary Election Results in Ireland, 1801–1922. Royal Irish Academy.
- Leigh Rayment's Historical List of MPs – Constituencies beginning with "T" (part 2)

=== See also ===
- List of UK Parliamentary constituencies in Ireland and Northern Ireland
