= Sir Hugh Stewart, 2nd Baronet =

Sir Hugh Stewart, 2nd Baronet (14 May 1792 – 19 November 1854) was a Tory politician in Ireland.

He was High Sheriff of Tyrone for 1827 and was member of parliament for County Tyrone from 1830 to 1835.

Stewart lived at Ballygawley House, Co. Tyrone.

In 1837, he married Elizabeth St. George, daughter of Rev. Henry Lucas St. George, of Co. Tyrone. Lady Stewart died aged 87 at her residence, Sandford Lodge, Ranelagh, on 2 September 1902.

Parliament of the United Kingdom
Preceded by William Stewart; Henry Lowry-Corry	Member of Parliament for County Tyrone; 1830–1835; With: Henry Lowry-Corry	Succeeded by Lord Claud Hamilton; Henry Lowry-Corry
Baronetage of England
Preceded by John Stewart	Baronet (of Athenree); 1825–1856	Succeeded by John Marcus Stewart
