= Thomas Alexander Dickson =

Irish politician (1833–1909)

Thomas Alexander Dickson PC (12 October 1833 – 17 June 1909) was an Irish Liberal Party politician. He represented a series of Irish constituencies as a Member of Parliament (MP) in the House of Commons of the United Kingdom of Great Britain and Ireland.

Dickson was elected to Westminster at the general election in 1874 as MP for Dungannon in County Tyrone, and re-elected at the 1880 general election. His re-election was declared void on 10 June 1880 following a petition from the losing candidate, Colonel Knox. His son, James Dickson won the seat at the subsequent by-election with an increased majority.

He was returned to Parliament the following year in a by-election for the County Tyrone constituency, and held that seat until the Tyrone constituency was divided at the 1885 general election.

He returned to Westminster three years later, in May 1888, when he won a by-election for the Dublin St Stephen's Green constituency. He held that seat until the 1892 general election.

He was a Trustee of Magee College, Derry from about 1880.

His daughter, Emily Winifred Dickson was the first woman to be elected Fellow of a college of surgeons in either Ireland or Great Britain and she initially had her practice in his home in Dublin while he was based there.

Parliament of the United Kingdom
Preceded by William Knox	Member of Parliament for Dungannon; 1874 – 1880	Succeeded by James Dickson
Preceded by Edward Falconer Litton; John Macartney	Member of Parliament for County Tyrone; 1881 – 1885; With: John Macartney	Constituency divided
Preceded by Edmund Dwyer Gray	Member of Parliament for Dublin St Stephen's Green; 1888 – 1892	Succeeded by William Kenny
