= James Dickson (Irish politician) =

Irish politician (1859–1941)

James Dickson (19 April 1859 – 8 August 1941) was an Irish Liberal Party politician in the era of the United Kingdom of Great Britain and Ireland. He was Member of Parliament (MP) for the borough of Dungannon from 1880 to 1885. Aged just 21 when elected, he was one of the youngest people elected to the House of Commons since the Reform Act 1832.

== Early life ==
Dickson was born in Dungannon on 19 April 1859 and educated at the Royal School there. His sister was Emily Winifred Dickson, the first woman to be elected to a college of surgeons in either Great Britain or Ireland.

== Parliamentary career ==
Dickson was elected to the House of Commons at a by-election on 25 June 1880. At the general election earlier in 1880 Dungannon had been held with a majority of 2 by the sitting Liberal MP, James Dickson's father Thomas Alexander Dickson, but the result had been declared void on petition because of bribery by the candidate's agent. A fresh election was called. James Dickson won the by-election with 132 votes to the 128 of his opponent, Colonel Stuart Knox, a Conservative, who had also contested the general election. James Dickson thus doubled his father's majority. Aged 21 years and 67 days, he became one of the youngest people elected to the House of Commons since the Reform Act 1832. His father re-entered Parliament in his own right at the next election. He held the seat until the Dungannon constituency was abolished at the 1885 general election.

== Later career ==
After leaving politics, Dickson continued his career by joining the family textile business, retiring after the First World War. For many years he was the Chairman of the Board of Governors of the Royal School, Chairman of the Technical School Committee, and Chairman of the Tuberculosis Sanatorium Committee. In 1918 he was appointed a DL for County Tyrone.

== Personal life ==
In 1884 Dickson married Annabella Graham Tillie, the youngest daughter of William Tillie of Londonderry. The couple had four children of whom one, William Tillie Dickson, was killed in the First World War.

== Death ==
James Dickson died at Weeke, Winchester, on 8 August 1941, aged 82.

== See also ==
- Baby of the House, an unofficial title given to the youngest member of a parliamentary house

Parliament of the United Kingdom
Preceded by Thomas Alexander Dickson	Member of Parliament for Dungannon; 1880 – 1885	Constituency abolished
