= Dublin St Stephen's Green =

UK parliamentary constituency in Ireland, 1885–1922

- Former borough constituency for the House of Commons
- Dublin St Stephen's Green constituency within Dublin, as it existed from 1885 to 1918.

- Dublin within Ireland. Map utilises the modern administrative boundaries.
- Borough: Dublin

1885–1922
- Seats: 1
- Created from: Dublin City
- Replaced by: Dublin South

St Stephen's Green, a division of Dublin, was a borough constituency in Ireland. It returned one Member of Parliament (MP) to the United Kingdom House of Commons from 1885 until 1922 on the first past the post electoral system.

From the dissolution of 1922, shortly before the establishment of the Irish Free State, the area was no longer represented in the UK Parliament.

== Boundaries ==
This constituency was named for St Stephen's Green and comprised parts of the south-east of the city of Dublin.

From 1885 to 1918, it was defined as:

Exchange Ward, Fitzwilliam Ward, Mansion House Wards, and those parts of the South Dock and Trinity wards not contained within the Dublin Harbour constituency, and that part of the parliamentary borough outside of the municipal borough boundary not contained within the Dublin Harbour constituency.

From 1918 to 1922, it was defined as:

the Royal Exchange, Fitzwilliam and Mansion House wards and those parts of the South Dock and Trinity wards not contained within the Dublin Harbour constituency.

== History ==
Prior to the 1885 general election, the city was the undivided two-member Dublin City constituency. Under the Redistribution of Seats Act 1885, Dublin was divided into four divisions: College Green, Dublin Harbour, St Stephen's Green, and St Patrick's. Under the Redistribution of Seats (Ireland) Act 1918, the city was allocated seven seats: in addition to the four existing constituencies, the new divisions were Clontarf, St James's and St Michan's.

Sinn Féin used the 1918 general election to elect members of Dáil Éireann, inviting all those elected in Ireland to sit as a Teachta Dála (known in English as a Deputy) in the Dáil rather than at Westminster, although only the Sinn Féin members attended. Thomas Kelly sat as a member of the First Dáil.

Under the Government of Ireland Act 1920, the area was combined with the St Patrick's Division to form Dublin South, a 4-seat constituency for the Southern Ireland House of Commons and a single constituency at Westminster. At the 1921 election for the Southern Ireland House of Commons, the four seats were won uncontested by Sinn Féin, who treated it as part of the election to the Second Dáil. Thomas Kelly was one of the four TDs for Dublin South.

Under s. 1(4) of the Irish Free State (Agreement) Act 1922, no writ was to be issued "for a constituency in Ireland other than a constituency in Northern Ireland". Therefore, no vote was held in Dublin South at the 1922 United Kingdom general election on 15 November 1922, shortly before the Irish Free State left the United Kingdom on 6 December 1922.

== Members of Parliament ==
From	To	Member	Party
1885	1888	Edmund Dwyer Gray	Irish Parliamentary
1888	1892	Thomas Alexander Dickson	Liberal
1892	1898	William Kenny	Liberal Unionist
1898	1900	James Campbell	Irish Unionist
1900	1904	James McCann	Irish Parliamentary
1904	1910	Laurence Ambrose Waldron	Irish Parliamentary
1910	1918	Patrick Joseph Brady	Irish Parliamentary
1918	1922	Thomas Kelly	Sinn Féin

== Elections ==
=== Elections in the 1910s ===
1918 general election: Dublin St Stephen's Green
Party	Candidate	Votes	%	±%
Sinn Féin	Thomas Kelly	8,461	59.9	New
Irish Parliamentary	P. J. Brady	2,902	20.6	▼35.9
Irish Unionist	Henry Hanna	2,755	19.5	▼24.0
Majority		5,559	39.3	N/A
Turnout		14,118	71.5	▼8.9
Registered electors		19,759		
Sinn Féin gain from Irish Parliamentary		Swing		

December 1910 general election: Dublin St Stephen's Green
Party	Candidate	Votes	%	±%
Irish Parliamentary	P. J. Brady	3,594	56.5	▲1.6
Irish Unionist	Reginald Herbert	2,765	43.5	▼1.6
Majority		829	13.0	▲3.2
Turnout		6,359	80.4	▼4.4
Registered electors		7,909		
Irish Parliamentary hold		Swing	▲1.6	

January 1910 general election: Dublin St Stephen's Green
Party	Candidate	Votes	%	±%
Irish Parliamentary	P. J. Brady	3,683	54.9	▼6.2
Irish Unionist	Henry Daniel Connor	3,021	45.1	▲6.2
Majority		662	9.8	▼12.4
Turnout		6,704	84.8	▲9.5
Registered electors		7,909		
Irish Parliamentary hold		Swing	▼6.2	

=== Elections in the 1900s ===
1906 general election: Dublin St Stephen's Green
Party	Candidate	Votes	%	±%
Irish Parliamentary	Laurence Ambrose Waldron	4,055	61.1	▲6.7
Irish Unionist	William Ireland	2,581	38.9	▼6.7
Majority		1,474	22.2	▲13.4
Turnout		6,636	75.3	▲3.0
Registered electors		8,816		
Irish Parliamentary hold		Swing	▲6.7	

1904 Dublin St Stephen's Green by-election
Party	Candidate	Votes	%	±%
Irish Parliamentary	Laurence Ambrose Waldron	3,457	55.1	▲0.7
Irish Unionist	Charles Louis Matheson	2,821	44.9	▼0.7
Majority		636	10.2	▲1.4
Turnout		6,278	78.3	▲6.0
Registered electors		8,018		
Irish Parliamentary hold		Swing	▲0.7	

Death of McCann

1900 general election: Dublin St Stephen's Green
Party	Candidate	Votes	%	±%
Irish Parliamentary	James McCann	3,429	54.4	▲7.7
Irish Unionist	James Campbell	2,873	45.6	▼7.7
Majority		556	8.8	N/A
Turnout		6,302	72.3	▼6.6
Registered electors		8,714		
Irish Parliamentary gain from Liberal Unionist		Swing	▲7.7	

=== Elections in the 1890s ===
1898 Dublin St Stephen's Green by-election
Party	Candidate	Votes	%	±%
Irish Unionist	James Campbell	3,525	51.0	▼2.3
Irish National League	George Plunkett	3,387	49.0	▲2.3
Majority		138	2.0	N/A
Turnout		6,912	79.1	▲0.2
Registered electors		8,735		
Irish Unionist gain from Liberal Unionist		Swing	▼2.3	

Kenny appointed a Judge of the High Court

1895 Dublin St Stephen's Green by-election
Party	Candidate	Votes	%	±%
Liberal Unionist	William Kenny	3,325	53.5	▲0.2
Irish National League	Pierce Mahoney	2,893	46.5	▼0.2
Majority		432	7.0	▲0.4
Turnout		6,218	78.9	Steady
Registered electors		8,697		
Liberal Unionist hold		Swing	▲0.2	

Kenny appointed Solicitor-General

1895 general election: Dublin St Stephen's Green
Party	Candidate	Votes	%	±%
Liberal Unionist	William Kenny	3,661	53.3	▲8.0
Irish National League	George Plunkett	3,205	46.7	▲1.6
Majority		456	6.6	▲6.4
Turnout		6,866	78.9	▼9.0
Registered electors		8,697		
Liberal Unionist hold		Swing	▲3.2	

1892 general election: Dublin St Stephen's Green
Party	Candidate	Votes	%	±%
Liberal Unionist	William Kenny	2,893	45.3	▲11.4
Irish National League	Joseph Meade	2,878	45.1	N/A
Irish National Federation	William Lovell Pearson	615	9.6	N/A
Majority		15	0.2	N/A
Turnout		6,386	87.9	▲13.5
Registered electors		7,261		
Liberal Unionist gain from Irish Parliamentary		Swing	N/A	

=== Elections in the 1880s ===
1888 Dublin St Stephen's Green by-election Registered electors 10,530
Party	Candidate	Votes	%	±%
Liberal	Thomas Alexander Dickson	4,819	62.2	New
Irish Conservative	Robert Sexton	2,932	37.8	▲3.9
Majority		1,887	24.4	N/A
Turnout		7,751	73.6	▼0.8
Registered electors		10,530		
Liberal gain from Irish Parliamentary		Swing	▼3.8	

Death of Gray

1886 general election: Dublin St Stephen's Green
Party	Candidate	Votes	%	±%
Irish Parliamentary	Edmund Dwyer Gray	5,008	66.1	▲4.8
Liberal Unionist	Sir Edward Sullivan, 2nd Baronet	2,565	33.9	▼4.8
Majority		2,443	32.2	▲9.6
Turnout		7,573	74.4	▼10.2
Registered electors		10,184		
Irish Parliamentary hold		Swing	▲4.8	

1885 general election: Dublin St Stephen's Green
Party	Candidate	Votes	%	±%
Irish Parliamentary	Edmund Dwyer Gray	5,277	61.3	
Irish Conservative	Edward Guinness	3,334	38.7	
Majority		1,943	22.6	
Turnout		8,611	84.6	
Registered electors		10,184		
Irish Parliamentary win (new seat)				

== Notes, citations and sources ==
=== Sources ===
- Walker, Brian M., ed. (1978). Parliamentary Election Results in Ireland, 1801–1922. Dublin: Royal Irish Academy. pp. 345–346, 388. ISBN 0901714127.
- Boundary Commission (Ireland) established in 1917 to redistribute seats in the House of Commons under the terms of the Representation of the People Bill, 1917 (1917). "Schedule 10 : Parliamentary borough of Dublin" ( (PDF)). Report. Vol. CSO/RP/1917/29520/36. National Archives of Ireland. Archived from the original on 4 December 2017.

=== External links ===
- Dáil Éireann Members Database Office of the Houses of the Oireachtas
- Dublin Historic Maps: Parliamentary & Dail Constituencies 1780–1969 (a work in progress)
