= 1873 County Tyrone by-election =

UK Parliamentary by-election

The 1873 Tyrone by-election was fought on 7 April 1873. The by-election was fought due to the death of the incumbent MP of the Conservative Party, Henry Thomas Lowry-Corry. It was won by the Conservative candidate Henry William Lowry-Corry.
