= Henry Lowry-Corry (1845–1927) =

British Army officer and politician (1845–1927)

Colonel Henry William Lowry-Corry DL, JP (30 June 1845 – 6 May 1927), styled The Honourable from birth, was a British Army officer and Conservative politician.

== Background ==
Born at Castle Coole, County Fermanagh on 30 June 1845 and baptised at the local parish church at Derryvullen a month later, he was the youngest son of Armar Lowry-Corry, 3rd Earl Belmore and his wife Emily Louise Shepherd, youngest daughter of William Shepherd. Lowry-Corry was educated at Eton College and then at the Royal Military Academy, Woolwich. Thereafter he went to Trinity College, Cambridge, where he graduated with a Bachelor of Arts in 1866 and a Master of Arts four years later. He lived at Edwardstone Hall in Suffolk. There is a memorial to him in the church of St Mary the Virgin in Edwardstone.

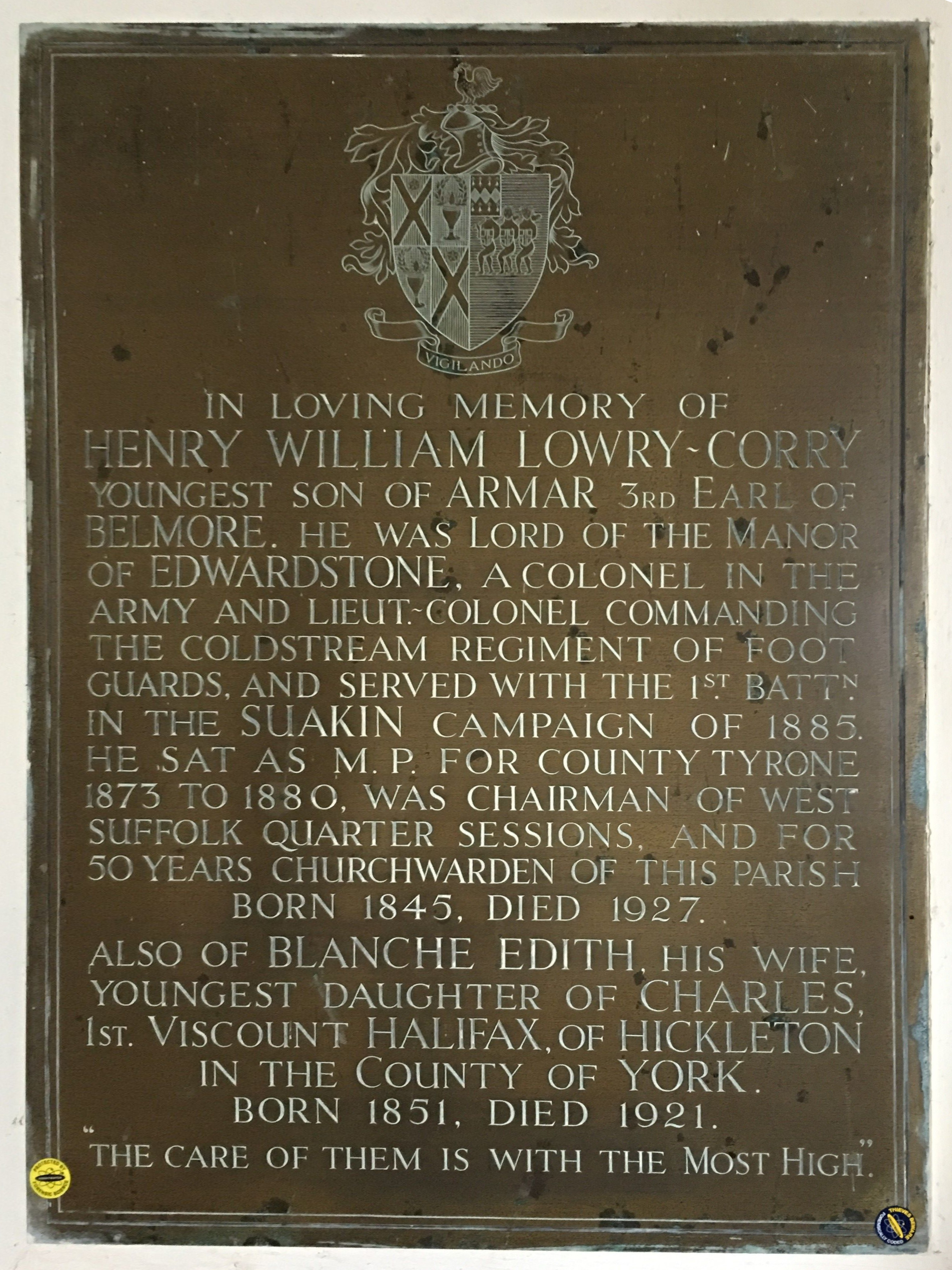
Memorial to Henry Lowry-Corry in the church of St Mary the Virgin, Edwardstone

== Career ==
Lowry-Corry was commissioned into the 1st Bn. Coldstream Guards, serving in the Suakin Expedition in 1885, for which he received the Egypt Medal with a clasp and the Khedive's Star. In 1903, he retired as colonel. He entered the British House of Commons in 1873, sitting as a Member of Parliament (MP) for County Tyrone until 1880. Lowry-Corry was a deputy lieutenant for Suffolk and represented it also as a justice of the peace. He was chairman of the county's Quarter Sessions, a vice-chairman of the Territorial Force Association.

== Family ==
On 21 September 1876, he married Hon. Blanche Edith Wood, daughter of Charles Wood, 1st Viscount Halifax by his wife Lady Mary Grey, fifth daughter of Charles Grey, 2nd Earl Grey and had issue:

- Emily Mary Lowry-Corry (b. 14 December 1882 d.?), who was married, as his second wife, on 1 February 1911 to Major Sir Richard Nelson Rycroft, 5th Baronet
- Alice Frances Louisa Lowry-Corry (22 May 1885 –8 August 1978), who was a justice of the peace for Suffolk and was unmarried
- Lieutenant Colonel Sir Henry Charles Lowry-Corry MC DL (20 February 1887 –23 December 1973), who fought in the First World War, where he was wounded. He gained the rank of Lieutenant-Colonel in the Royal Artillery and was awarded the Military Cross. He also fought in the Second World War between 1939 and 1942, before he became a Prisoner of War. He was married to Betty Alice Adeline Proby, daughter of Colonel Douglas James Proby (see Proby Baronets) and Lady Margaret Frances Hely-Hutchinson (17 May 1889 –1978), daughter of Richard Hely-Hutchinson, 4th Earl of Donoughmore, on 27 April 1920 and had issue. His daughter, Edith, married Michael Carver, Baron Carver. He lived at Edwardstone Hall in Suffolk.
- Frederick Richard Henry Lowry-Corry (13 May 1890 –30 September 1915), who fought as a lieutenant in the "C" Bty. 47th Bde. Royal Field Artillery in the First World War and died from wounds received in action at Ypres, aged 25. He is buried at Etaples Military Cemetery in France.

Parliament of the United Kingdom
Preceded by Lord Claude Hamilton; Henry Thomas Lowry-Corry	Member of Parliament for County Tyrone; 1873 – 1880; With: Lord Claude Hamilton 1873–1874; John William Ellison-Macartney 1874–1880	Succeeded by John William Ellison-Macartney; Edward Falconer Litton
