= Emily Winifred Dickson =

Irish doctor, first female Fellow of a Royal College of Surgery (1866–1944)

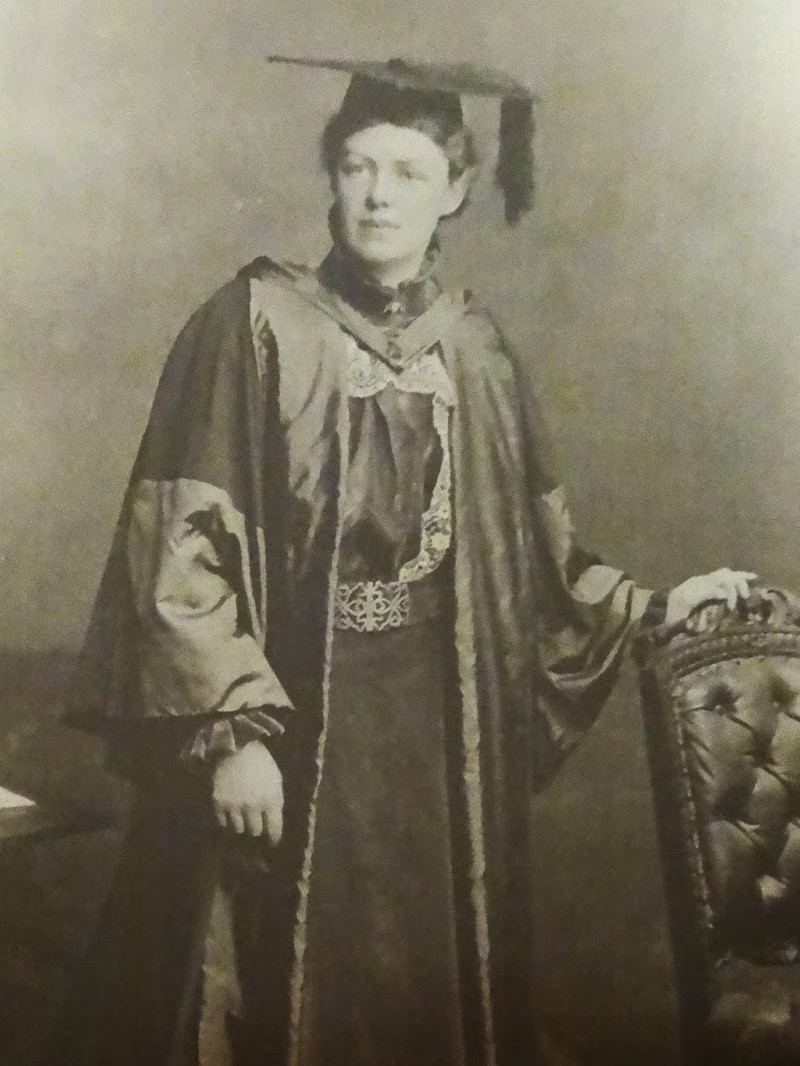
- Born: 13 July 1866; Dungannon, County Tyrone, Ireland
- Died: 19 January 1944 (aged 77); Lancashire, England, UK
- Other name: Emily Winifred Dickson Martin
- Education: Royal College of Surgeons in Ireland
- Occupation: Doctor
- Years active: 1891–1944
- Known for: First woman Fellow of a College of Surgeons

Emily Winifred Dickson (13 July 1866 – 19 January 1944) was an Irish medical doctor who was the first female fellow of the Royal College of Surgeons in Ireland. She was also the first female fellow of any of the Royal Colleges of Surgery in Great Britain and Ireland.

== Early life ==
Dickson, born in Dungannon, County Tyrone, was the fifth child of the Ulster Liberal Member of Parliament Thomas Alexander Dickson. Her mother Elizabeth (née McGeagh) was ill for most of her childhood, and doctors were common in the house. Dickson nursed her mother for a year after her school days. She then, with family support, decided she wanted to be a doctor. She had been educated at the Mrs Byers' Ladies Collegiate School in Belfast and went from there to London's Harold House School.

Her brother James was an Ulster Liberal Party Member of Parliament for the borough of Dungannon from 1880 to 1885. Until the election of Mhairi Black he had been the youngest member of parliament.

Dickson was the second youngest of seven children; three boys (James, John McGeagh, Thomas) and four girls (Sarah Louise, Mary, Emily, and Edith).

== Education ==
Dickson was not allowed to attend Trinity College, Dublin, as women were not permitted. In 1887, she was accepted to the Royal College of Surgeons in Ireland which was just starting to accept women as students. She was the only woman medical student in her year. She managed to complete her training as she was permitted to take part in all the necessary activities in Sir Patrick Dun's Hospital, the Rotunda Lying-in Hospital and the National Eye and Ear Infirmary as well as the Donnybrook Dispensary and Richmond Lunatic Asylum.

Dickson achieved her licence in 1891 and her Bachelor of Medicine in 1893, the latter with first class honours. In the same year, she was elected fellow of the college, the first in Ireland or Great Britain.

It was the same year that Doctor Elizabeth Bell qualified at Queen's University in Belfast.

== Early career ==
Following her graduation, Dickson was awarded a travelling scholarship by the Royal University of Ireland. She spent six months working in Vienna and Berlin. However, in Berlin she faced significant resistance about her gender, with one professor claiming she had cheated to get her position on his course and that Winifred was a man's name.

Dickson gained her hospital experience at a variety of institutions between 1889 and 1892 she trained at St. Patrick Dun's Hospital.

In 1894 Dickson opened her practice in her father's Dublin residence while he was MP for a constituency there until he left the city. She then took up a position as gynaecologist for the Richmond, Whitworth and Hardwick Hospital along with her own practice which she had moved to a new location. She was also selected as the assistant master to the Coombe Lying-in Hospital from 1895 to 1898.

In 1896, she completed her Doctorate in Medicine along with a Masters in Obstetrics – again achieving both with honours. She was then chosen as the examiner in midwifery in the Royal College of Surgeons. Although she was described by some colleagues as the best gynaecologist in Dublin, many of the students disliked the idea of a woman examining them on midwifery and a petition, 14 pages of signatures long, was unsuccessfully presented to the Council of Royal College of Surgeons.

Dickson was not purely interested in her own career and development. While in Vienna, Dickson wrote to the British Medical Journal on the importance of women doctors in the workhouses. She supported the National Society for the Prevention of Cruelty to Children and the Irish Association for the Prevention of Intemperance. In 1895, she presented a paper on the urgency of having women as Poor Law Guardians in Ireland. Her correspondence with the British Medical Association was to ensure women had access to membership and as soon as they did, in 1892, she became a member.

Dickson became a member of staff at St. Ultan's Hospital from its foundation in 1919.

== Family and later career ==
Dickson practised medicine until her marriage to the younger Scot, Robert MacGregor Martin in 1899. They had four sons and a daughter: Russell, Kenneth, Alan, Colin, and Elizabeth. Martin served in the First World War in Burma, and when he did return from the war, it was with severe shell shock. While he was in the Army, Dickson finally returned to medical practice, initially as the assistant medical officer at Rainhill Mental Hospital in Lancashire and then a locum in Ellesmere, Shropshire. These roles allowed her to be near the boarding school which her children attended and provide a home during their holidays. Although on her marriage she became Emily Martin, when working Dickson used her birth name as it was the name on her certification. Eventually she bought out the Ellesmere practice, but caught the Spanish flu in 1919 and her health was affected. She left there and purchased a practice in Wimbledon.

Dickson and her husband separated, and ongoing medical health issues prevented her from remaining in one location. She moved several times over the next few years, each time poor health forcing her to stop work for a time.

Dickson's daughter Elizabeth was educated in Oxford, where she met and married fellow student Kenneth Clark, a historian and writer best known for the BBC Television series Civilisation. Her grandsons were the military historian and Conservative MP Alan Clark and the filmmaker Colin Clark.

Despite her health, Dickson voyaged to New Zealand by sea to visit one of her sons and his two children. She returned in anticipation of the war breaking out. In 1940, she went back to Rainhill Mental Hospital in Lancashire. In a letter in 1942, Dickson observed that women's emancipation was the only global movement in which she took an interest. She was working in Rainhill and living with her son, Colin, in Lancashire, when she died of cancer aged 77. Her obituary appeared in the major medical journals, including The Lancet and the British Medical Journal.

A digital archive of papers and collections related to Emily Winifred Dickson is available on the RCSI Digital Heritage Collections.
