= 1902 Dublin Corporation election =

Local election in Ireland

Results by ward.

An election to Dublin Corporation took place in March 1902 as part of that year's Irish local elections. The election saw a small decline in Labour representation, whilst the Nationalists continued their dominance of the council.

Since the last election the rifts between the United Irish League and the Irish National League had been healed, with the two groups reuniting.

== Council composition following election ==
Party	Seats	±	Seats %	Votes	Votes %	±%
Irish Nationalist	58	▲13	72.5			
Irish Unionist	16	▲9	20.0			
LEA	5	▼3	6.3			
Independent	1	▲1	1.3			
Totals	80	▲20	100.0		100.0	—

== Ward results ==
=== Arran Quay ===
==== Alderman ====
Arran Quay Ward Electorate: 5,396
Party	Candidate	Votes	%	±%
Irish Nationalist	Arthur Gaynor	1,750	51.61	
Irish Nationalist	James Cummins (incumbent)	1,641	48.39	
Majority		109		
Turnout		3,391	62.84	
		Swing		

==== Councillor ====
Arran Quay Ward Electorate: 5,396
Party	Candidate	Votes	%	±%
Irish Nationalist	John Keogh (incumbent)	1,733	51.09	
Irish Nationalist	Thomas Dunne	1,659	48.91	
Majority		75	2.21	
Turnout		3,392	62.86	
		Swing		

=== Clontarf East ===
Clontarf East Ward Electorate: 626
Party	Candidate	Votes	%	±%
Irish Nationalist	M. J. Judge (incumbent)	277		
Irish Unionist	W. J. Hardman	191		
Majority		86		
Turnout		468		
Irish Nationalist hold		Swing		

=== Clontarf West ===
Clontarf West Ward Electorate: 809
Party	Candidate	Votes	%	±%
Irish Unionist	W. J. Woodhams (incumbent)	308		
Irish Nationalist	J. Doyle	303		
Majority		5		
Turnout		611		
Irish Unionist hold		Swing		

=== Drumcondra Ward ===
Drumcondra Ward Electorate: 1,546
Party	Candidate	Votes	%	±%
Irish Nationalist	Thomas J. Lawler (incumbent)	620	80.42	
Irish Unionist	Michael McDonnagh J.P.	151	19.58	
Majority		469	60.84	N/A
Turnout		771	49.87	
Irish Nationalist gain from Irish Unionist		Swing		

=== Fitzwilliam Ward ===
Fitzwilliam Ward Electorate: 2,076
Party	Candidate	Votes	%	±%
Irish Unionist	John Keys	569	39.82	
Irish Nationalist	Thomas Kennedy	564	39.47	
United Irish League	James J. Kelly	296	20.71	
Majority		5	0.35	N/A
Turnout		1,429	68.83	
Irish Unionist gain from Irish Nationalist		Swing		

=== Glasnevin ===
Glasnevin Ward Electorate: 1,299
Party	Candidate	Votes	%	±%
Irish Nationalist	Garrett Begg (incumbent)	442		
Irish Unionist	Frank Donaldson	260		
Majority		182		
Turnout				
Irish Nationalist hold		Swing		

=== Inns Quay Ward ===
==== Alderman ====
Inns Quay Ward Electorate: 4,309
Party	Candidate	Votes	%	±%
Irish Nationalist	Thomas Lenehan (incumbent)	1,299	58.94	
United Irish League	Fitzpatrick	905	41.06	
Majority		394		
Turnout				
Irish Nationalist hold		Swing		

==== Councillor ====
Inns Quay Ward Electorate: 4,309
Party	Candidate	Votes	%	±%
Irish Nationalist	Joseph Downes (incumbent)	1,237	56.85	
United Irish League	John Wyne Power	939	43.15	
Majority		296	13.60	
Turnout		2,176	50.50	
Irish Nationalist hold		Swing		

=== Mansion House Ward ===
Mansion House Ward Electorate: 1,846
Party	Candidate	Votes	%	±%
Irish Nationalist	Thomas Kelly (incumbent)	892	80.1	
Irish Nationalist	Thomas Fitzgerald	221	19.9	
Majority		671	60.2	
Turnout		1,113	60.29	
Irish Nationalist hold		Swing		

=== Mountjoy Ward ===
==== Alderman ====
Mountjoy Ward Electorate: 50 spoiled ballots
Party	Candidate	Votes	%	±%
United Irish League	John J. Farrell	1,300	51.24	
Irish Nationalist	Parkinson	1,237	48.76	
Majority		63		
Turnout		2,537		
		Swing		

=== New Kilmainham ===
New Kilmainham Ward Electorate: 1,955
Party	Candidate	Votes	%	±%
Irish Nationalist	William Reigh	591		
Irish Nationalist	Ambrose Walsh	39		
Majority		552		
Turnout				
		Swing		

=== North City Ward ===
==== Alderman ====
North City Ward Electorate: 2,092
Party	Candidate	Votes	%	±%
Irish Nationalist	James Hennessy (incumbent)	751		
	Edward William Stuart			
Majority				
Turnout				

==== Councillor ====
North City Ward Electorate: 2,092
Party	Candidate	Votes	%	±%
Irish Nationalist	Patrick White	536	50.23	
	William McLoughlin	371	34.77	
Irish Socialist Republican	James Allen	160	15.00	
Majority				
Turnout				
		Swing		

=== North Dock ===
==== Alderman ====
North Dock Ward Electorate: 3,238
Party	Candidate	Votes	%	±%
Irish Nationalist	Daniel Bergin	1,185	65.43	
Irish Nationalist	Thomas Byrne	626	34.57	
Majority		559		
Turnout				
		Swing		

==== Councillor ====
North Dock Ward Electorate: 3,238
Party	Candidate	Votes	%	±%
United Irish League	Timothy Harrington (incumbent Lord Mayor)	1,294	71.9	
Irish Nationalist	M.J. Murphy	506	28.1	
Majority		788	43.8	
Turnout		1,800		
United Irish League hold		Swing		

=== Royal Exchange Ward ===
Royal Exchange Ward Electorate:
Party	Candidate	Votes	%	±%
Irish Unionist	Edward Weber Smyth	477	51.40	
Irish Nationalist	Michael Murray (incumbent)	449	48.38	
Independent	L. Jackson	2	0.22	
Majority		28	3.02	
Turnout		928		
gain from		Swing		

=== South City Ward ===
South City Ward Electorate: 1,029
Party	Candidate	Votes	%	±%
Irish Unionist	George Healy (incumbent)	343	48.17	
United Irish League	T. J. O'Reilly	332	46.63	
Irish Nationalist	Thomas Read	31	4.35	
Irish Nationalist	J. O'Neill	6	0.84	
Majority		11	1.54	
Turnout		712		
Irish Unionist hold		Swing		

=== Wood Quay Ward ===
Wood Quay Ward Electorate: 4,022
Party	Candidate	Votes	%	±%
Irish Nationalist	Patrick Joseph McCall (incumbent)	1,424	69.60	
Irish Socialist Republican	James Connolly	431	21.07	
Irish Nationalist	W. H. Beardwood	191	9.34	
Majority		993	48.53	
Turnout		2,046	50.87	
		Swing		
