= Irish Socialist Republican Party =

Former Irish political party

- Leader: James Connolly
- Founded: May 1896
- Dissolved: 1904
- Preceded by: Dublin Socialist Club
- Succeeded by: Socialist Party of Ireland (1904)
- Ideology: Socialism; Irish republicanism Anti-imperialism; Marxism
- Political position: Left-wing

The Irish Socialist Republican Party was a small but pivotal Irish political party founded in 1896 by James Connolly. Its aim was to establish an Irish workers' republic. The party split in 1904 following months of internal political rows

== History ==
The party was small throughout its existence. According to ISRP historian David Lynch, the party never had more than 80 active members. Upon its founding one journalist commented that the party had more syllables than members. The party emerged out of the Dublin Socialist Club when a motion was put forward at Pierce Ryan's pub on Thomas Street, Dublin to form a party. Connolly and six others were present at inaugural meeting.

Nevertheless, the ISRP is regarded by many Irish historians as a party of seminal importance in the early history of Irish socialism and republicanism. It is often described as the first socialist and republican party in Ireland, and the first organisation to espouse the ideology of socialist republicanism on the island. During its lifespan it only had one really active branch, the Dublin one. There were several attempts to create branches in Cork, Belfast, Limerick, Naas, and even in northern England but they never came to much. The party established links with feminist and revolutionary Maud Gonne who approved of the party.

The party produced the first regular socialist paper in Ireland, the Workers' Republic, ran candidates in local elections, represented Ireland at the Second International, and agitated over issues such as the Boer War and the 1798 rebellion commemorations. Politically the ISRP was before its time, putting the call for an independent "Republic" at the centre of its propaganda before Sinn Féin or others had done so. The ISRP opposed Home Rule as a middle-class and capitalist effort that was unlikely to achieve social reforms.

A public meeting held by the party is described in Irish socialist playwright Seán O'Casey's autobiography Drums under the Window.

In 1900 it sent delegates to the International Socialist Congress of the Second International in Paris, representing Ireland instead of Britain. It also became involved in the campaign against the Boer War. In 1902, Connolly ran as an ISRP candidate in that years elections to Dublin Corporation, failing to unseat the incumbent Patrick Joseph McCall (United Irish League) but did receive 431 votes (21.07%).

Connolly, who was the full-time paid organiser for the party, subsequently left Ireland for the United States in 1903 following internal conflict; in fact it seems to have been a combination of the petty infighting and his own poverty that caused Connolly to abandon Ireland (he returned in 1910). Connolly had clashed with the party's other leading light, E. W. Stewart, over trade union and electoral strategy. A small number of members around Stewart established an anti-Connolly micro organisation called the Irish Socialist Labour Party. In 1904, this merged with the remains of the ISRP to form the Socialist Party of Ireland.
