= Lord Claud Hamilton (1813–1884) =

British politician (1813–1884)

The Right Honourable Lord Claud Hamilton
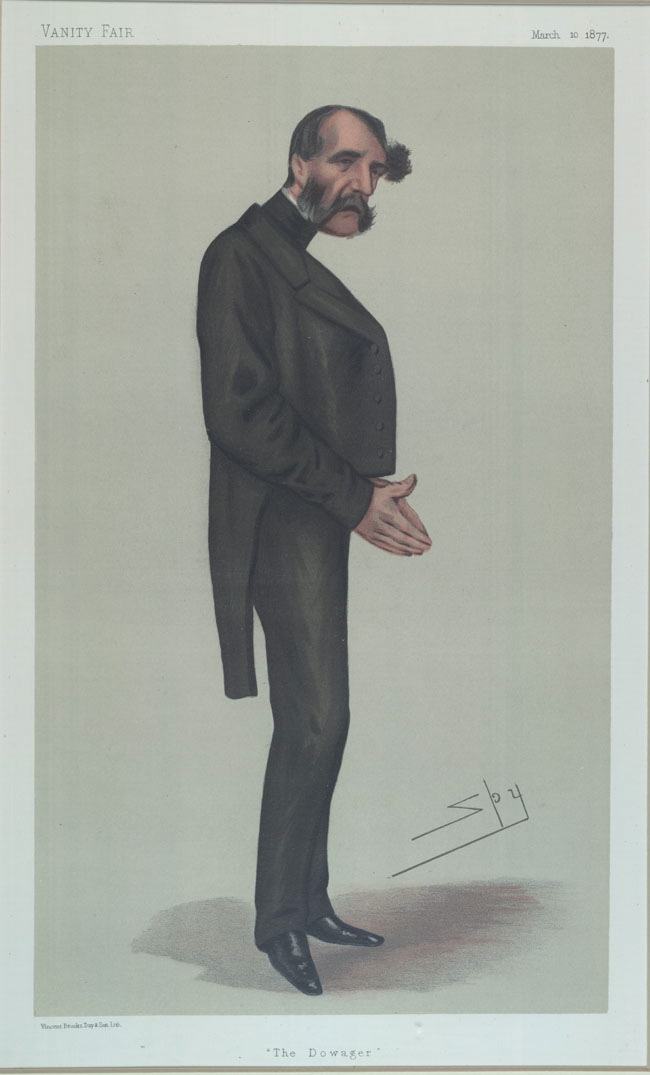
- "The Dowager". Caricature by Spy published in Vanity Fair in 1877.

Vice-Chamberlain of the Household
- In office 10 July 1866 – 1 December 1868
- Monarch: Victoria
- Prime Minister: The Earl of Derby; Benjamin Disraeli
- Preceded by: The Earl of Bradford
- Succeeded by: Viscount Castlerosse

Personal details
- Born: 27 July 1813
- Died: 3 June 1884 (aged 70)
- Party: Conservative
- Spouse: Lady Elizabeth Proby (1821–1900)
- Children: 4, including Douglas Proby and Louisa Charlotte Tyndall
- Parent(s): James Hamilton, Viscount Hamilton; Harriet Douglas
- Education: Trinity College, Cambridge

Lord Claud Hamilton PC (27 July 1813 – 3 June 1884) was a British Conservative politician. He notably served as Treasurer of the Household in 1852 and between 1858 and 1859 and as Vice-Chamberlain of the Household between 1866 and 1868.

== Background and education ==
Hamilton was the second son of James Hamilton, Viscount Hamilton, eldest son of John Hamilton, 1st Marquess of Abercorn. His mother was Harriet Douglas, daughter of the Honourable John Douglas, younger son of James Douglas, 14th Earl of Morton. James Hamilton, 1st Duke of Abercorn, was his elder brother. He was educated at Harrow and Trinity College, Cambridge.

== Political career ==
Hamilton sat as member of parliament for County Tyrone from 1835 to 1837 and again from 1839 to 1874. When the Conservatives came to power in February 1852 under the Earl of Derby, Hamilton was admitted to the Privy Council and appointed Treasurer of the Household, a post he held until the government fell in December 1852. He held the same office under Derby from 1858 to 1859. When Derby became prime minister for a third time in 1866, Hamilton was promoted to Vice-Chamberlain of the Household, a position he retained until 1868, the last year under the premiership of Benjamin Disraeli. He could talk fluently and well on almost any topic at indefinite length. One of his speeches lasted four hours and twenty minutes, one of the longest then on record in the House of Commons.

He was commissioned as Lieutenant-Colonel Commandant of the part-time Prince of Wales's Own Donegal Militia on 22 September 1855. He passed the command over to his nephew Lord Claud John Hamilton in 1867.

== Family ==
Hamilton married Lady Elizabeth Proby, daughter of Granville Proby, 3rd Earl of Carysfort, on 7 August 1844. They had one son and three daughters. Hamilton's wife Elizabeth was the translator from French to English of 'Louis Pasteur: His life and times' by Pasteur's son-in-law. His only son Douglas became a soldier and Member of Parliament while his grandson Richard was created a Baronet in 1952 (see Proby Baronets). A daughter, Louisa Hamilton, married physicist John Tyndall. Hamilton died in June 1884, aged 70.

Parliament of the United Kingdom
Preceded by Henry Lowry-Corry; Sir Hugh Stewart, Bt	Member of Parliament for County Tyrone; 1835–1837; With: Henry Lowry-Corry	Succeeded by Henry Lowry-Corry; Viscount Alexander
Preceded by Henry Lowry-Corry; Viscount Alexander	Member of Parliament for County Tyrone; 1839–1874; With: Henry Lowry-Corry 1839–1873; Henry Lowry-Corry 1873–1874	Succeeded by Henry Lowry-Corry; John Ellison-Macartney
Party political offices
Preceded by Viscount Mahon	Chairman of the National Union of Conservative and Constitutional Associations; 1876–1878	Succeeded by Earl Percy
Political offices
Preceded by Lord Marcus Hill	Treasurer of the Household; 1852	Succeeded by Earl of Mulgrave
Preceded by Earl of Mulgrave	Treasurer of the Household; 1858–1859	Succeeded by Viscount Bury
Preceded by Viscount Castlerosse	Vice-Chamberlain of the Household; 1866–1868	Succeeded by Viscount Castlerosse
