= 1888 Dublin St Stephen's Green by-election =

UK parliamentary by-election

Dublin St Stephen's Green constituency within Dublin, as it existed from 1885 to 1918.

The 1888 Dublin St Stephen's Green by-election was a parliamentary by-election held for the United Kingdom House of Commons constituency of Dublin St Stephen's Green on 12 May 1888. It arose as a result of the death of the sitting member, Edmund Dwyer Gray, of the Irish Parliamentary Party. In April, the Times reported that Wilfrid Blunt would be the Irish Parliamentary Party candidate. However, in a bid to appeal to Ulster Presbyterians, the Irish Party leader Charles Stewart Parnell nominated Thomas Alexander Dickson, a Presbyterian who had been Liberal MP for Dungannon and County Tyrone, as candidate. The Conservatives nominated Robert Sexton, a member of Dublin Corporation and Chairman of the South Dublin Union Poor Law Board. Sexton was supported also by the Liberal Unionists. His campaign was interrupted unexpectedly by the death of his wife.

Sexton received 2,932 votes, an increase on the Unionist performance in the preceding general election. Dickson received 4,819 votes, down slightly from Gray's general election result, and was declared elected. At the next general election, in 1892, he contested the seat of South Tyrone as a Liberal, losing to a Liberal Unionist. It was reported that a boy of 14, whose name was on the register, had voted for Dickson.

== Result ==
Dublin St Stephen's Green by-election, 1888 Registered electors 10,530
Party	Candidate	Votes	%	±%
Liberal	Thomas Alexander Dickson	4,819	62.3	▼3.8
Irish Conservative	Robert Sexton	2,920	37.7	▲3.8
Majority		1,899	24.6	▼7.6
Turnout		7,739	73.5	▼0.9
Liberal gain from Irish Parliamentary		Swing	▼3.8	

== Previous result ==
General election 1886: Dublin St Stephen's Green Registered electors 10,184
Party	Candidate	Votes	%	±%
Irish Parliamentary	Edmund Dwyer Gray	5,008	66.1	▲4.8
Irish Conservative	Sir Edward Sullivan	2,565	33.9	▼4.8
Majority		2,443	32.2	▲9.6
Turnout		7,573	74.4	▼10.2
Irish Parliamentary hold		Swing	▲4.8	
