= Louisa Charlotte Tyndall =

Wife and assistant of John Tyndall (1845–1940)

Louisa Charlotte Tyndall (née Hamilton; 3 August 1845 – 19 August 1940) was the eldest daughter of Lord Claud Hamilton in England. Her uncle, the Duke of Abercorn, was the Lord Lieutenant of Ireland. She was born at Chester Square in London's Belgravia district, but otherwise little is known of her early life and education. She was the wife and assistant to the Irish physicist John Tyndall. John Tyndall was best known for experiments regarding scattering light by atmospheric particles and the absorption of infrared radiation by gases. She was a key component in John Tyndall's experiments and research and her greatest impacts lie in his work. After his death she compiled all of his records and research together, so there is a significant collection of his work.

== Tyndall and John's Relationship ==
Tyndall's mother, Lady Elizabeth Proby, was a member of the Royal Institution which allowed her to encounter John Tyndall. At the time that they met, John was the Superintendent of the House and the Director of the Laboratory at the Royal Institution. The two began forming a more intimate relationship through letters after John completed his seven lectures on electricity. There was an extensive age gap between the couple, with Louisa Tyndall just over 30 and John in his 50s. She assisted him with his work and writing his paper for the Royal Institution for some time before they made their relationship public. John described his future wife as a good companion and assistant with no beauty. He viewed her as beneficial to his work and even described her to his friends this way. In a letter he told his friend Spencer that she was not attractive, but she was true, caring, strong, and selfless. Her wealth was not a motive for John to marry Tyndall for her father died in 1884 and left her very little money from his estate. The two enjoyed time outside of the lab and calculations as well. They enjoyed hiking and climbing mountains together. Tyndall especially enjoyed hiking the Alps, where they had a chalet. The summer after they got married, the couple climbed Aletschhorn which is nearly 14,000 ft. They moved to live together in Hindhead, a village in Surrey, England.

== Career ==
Tyndall worked with John for 17 years and in that time, helped him closely with his research and writing. She assisted him in the laboratory, took notes, and helped write "our recent observations for the Philosophical Magazine". She had an excitement for experimenting and some of her work turned out to be very successful. Despite these successes, Tyndall's name did not make it on any paper because she was contributing at a time in which women were not viewed as capable of coming up with their own scientific discoveries. Tyndall is the main reason that the world has significant information about John Tyndall and his life. She was considered to be a silent member of the editing contributions for Correspondence because her impact remained nameless.

== Later life ==
Tyndall died on 19 August 1940, aged 95, at Hindhead House, Hindhead. She outlived John by 47 years and throughout their time together, they had no children. John died from being accidentally given the wrong amount of medicine by Louisa, which caused him to overdose on chloral hydrate. John had been using chloral hydrate to treat his insomnia for some time before the incident. Louisa gave him the dose because he was sick and bedridden. After his death on 4 December 1893, she worked on writing his biography until she died in 1940. After John's death, Tyndall refused to publish a biography of his work until all of his research was organized and finalized. It took Tyndall to die in 1940 for John's biography to be published in 1945. Louisa gave permission to A. S. Eve and C. H. Creasey to publish the biography before she died. She is the reason that there is a detailed record of John's life and work.
