= Edward Falconer Litton =

British politician

Edward Falconer Litton (1827 – 27 November 1890) was an Irish barrister and Liberal Party politician. He was briefly Member of Parliament (MP) for County Tyrone.

Litton was elected to the House of Commons at the general election in October 1880, but left Parliament to take up an appointment as a land commissioner.

Parliament of the United Kingdom
Preceded by Henry Lowry-Corry; John Macartney	Member of Parliament for County Tyrone; 1880 – 1881; With: John Macartney	Succeeded by Thomas Alexander Dickson; John Macartney
