= Henry Lowry-Corry (1803–1873) =

British politician (1803–1873)

The Right Honourable Henry Lowry-Corry
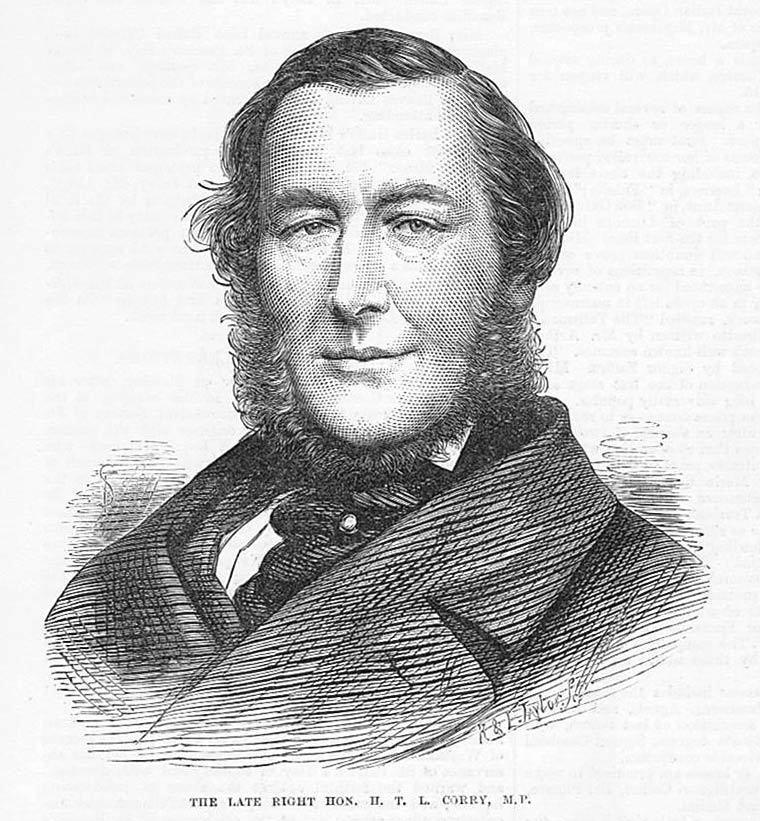

First Lord of the Admiralty
- In office 8 March 1867 – 1 December 1868
- Monarch: Victoria
- Prime Minister: The Earl of Derby; Benjamin Disraeli
- Preceded by: Sir John Pakington, Bt
- Succeeded by: Hugh Childers

Personal details
- Born: 9 March 1803
- Died: 5 March 1873 (aged 69)
- Party: Conservative
- Spouse(s): Lady Harriet Ashley-Cooper (d. 1868)

Henry Thomas Lowry-Corry, PC (9 March 1803 – 5 March 1873) was a British Conservative politician, briefly First Lord of the Admiralty.

== Background ==
Lowry-Corry was the younger son of Somerset Lowry-Corry, 2nd Earl Belmore, and Lady Juliana Butler, daughter of Henry Butler, 2nd Earl of Carrick.

== Political career ==
Lowry-Corry entered Parliament for County Tyrone in 1825, a seat he held until his death 48 years later, and was sworn of the Privy Council in 1835. He served as Comptroller of the Household under Sir Robert Peel between 1834 and 1835, as a Civil Lord of the Admiralty under Peel between 1841 and 1845, as First Secretary of the Admiralty under Peel again between 1845 and 1846. Under Lord Derby between 1858 and 1859 and as Vice-President of the Committee on Education between 1867 and 1867. The latter year Derby promoted him to First Lord of the Admiralty with a seat in the cabinet, a position he held until December 1868, the last nine months under the premiership of Benjamin Disraeli. At the time of his death, he was the longest-serving member of the House of Commons, known as Father of the House.

== Family ==
Lowry-Corry married Lady Harriet Ashley-Cooper, daughter of Cropley Ashley-Cooper, 6th Earl of Shaftesbury by his wife Lady Anne Spencer, fourth daughter of George Spencer, 4th Duke of Marlborough, in 1830 and had issue:

- Armar Henry Lowry-Corry (14 March 1836 – 9 September 1893), who married and had two sons: Noel Armar Lowry-Corry (1867–1935) who married the Hon. Clare O'Brien (1875–1950), daughter of Edward O'Brien, 14th Baron Inchiquin and Reginald Charles Lowry-Corry (1875 - 1945). His daughter was Berta Mary de Bunsen (née Lowry-Corry, 1869 - 1954)
- Montagu Corry, 1st Baron Rowton (8 October 1838 – 9 November 1903), who was Private Secretary to Prime Minister Benjamin Disraeli and was created Lord Rowton in 1880.

Lowry-Corry survived his wife Lady Harriet by five years and died on 5 March 1873, aged 69.

Parliament of the United Kingdom
Preceded by Sir John Stewart, Bt; William Stewart	Member of Parliament for County Tyrone; 1825–1873; With: William Stewart 1825–1830; Sir Hugh Stewart, Bt 1830–1835; Lord Claud Hamilton 1835–1837 & 1839–1873; Viscount Alexander 1837–1839	Succeeded by Lord Claud Hamilton; Hon. Henry Lowry-Corry
Honorary titles
Preceded by Thomas Peers Williams	Father of the House; 1868–1873	Succeeded by George Weld-Forester, 3rd Baron Forester
Political offices
Preceded by Lord Robert Grosvenor	Comptroller of the Household; 1834–1835	Succeeded by George Byng
Preceded by Lord Dalmeny	Civil Lord of the Admiralty; 1841–1845	Succeeded by Hon. Henry FitzRoy
Preceded by Hon. Sidney Herbert	First Secretary of the Admiralty; 1845–1846	Succeeded by Henry George Ward
Preceded by Ralph Bernal Osborne	First Secretary of the Admiralty; 1858–1859	Succeeded by Lord Clarence Paget
Preceded by Henry Bruce	Vice-President of the Committee of the Council on Education; 1866–1867	Succeeded by Lord Robert Montagu
Preceded by Sir John Pakington, Bt	First Lord of the Admiralty; 1867–1868	Succeeded by Hugh Childers
