= Patrick Joseph McCall =

P.J. McCall – Irish Songwriter, Poet, and Historian

Patrick Joseph McCall (6 March 1861 – 8 March 1919) known as "P.J. McCall" was an Irish songwriter, historian, and poet, known mostly as the author of lyrics for popular ballads. He was assisted in putting the Wexford ballads, dealing with the 1798 Rising, to music by Arthur Warren Darley using traditional Irish airs. His surname is one of the many anglicizations of the Irish surname Mac Cathmhaoil, a family that were chieftains of Kinel Farry (Clogher area) in County Tyrone. McCall's ancestors relocated from Tyrone to Carlow in the early 1600s.

== Life ==
McCall was born at 25 Patrick Street, Dublin, the son of John McCall P.L.G. (1822–1902), a publican, grocer, historian, almanac editor, and folklorist from Clonmore near Hacketstown in County Carlow and Elizabeth Newport (1832–1890) from Wexford. He attended Synge Street CBS and St. Joseph's Monastery, Harold's Cross, a Catholic University School. He was the brother of two boys, each named Michael Joseph McCall, and each of whom died in infancy and are buried with their parents in Prospect Cemetery, Glasnevin, Dublin.

He spent his summer holidays in Rathangan, County Wexford where he spent time with local musicians and ballad singers – his mother came from Rathangan near Duncormick on the south coast of County Wexford. His aunt Ellen Newport provided much of the raw material for the songs and tunes meticulously recorded by her nephew. He also collected many old Irish airs, but is probably best remembered for his patriotic ballads. Airs gathered at rural céilí and sing-songs were delivered back to the Royal Irish Academy in Dublin.

He contributed to the Dublin Historical Record, the Irish Monthly, The Shamrock and Old Moore's Almanac (under the pseudonym Cavellus). He was a member of the group in Dublin which founded the National Literary Society and became its first honorary secretary.

In the 1902 Dublin Corporation election he was elected as a Dublin city councillor (defeating James Connolly) and served three terms. As a councillor he concerned himself with local affairs, particularly projects to alleviate poverty.

He married Margaret Furlong, a sister of the poet Alice Furlong, in 1901. They lived in a house named Westpoint on the seafront in the suburb of Sutton, near Howth. His first cousin Ellie Coffey (née McCall) was the mother of (among 10 others) famed paediatrician Dr. Victoria Coffey.

== Writings ==
- "In the shadow of St. Patrick's. A paper read before the National Literary Society|Irish National Literary Society", 27 April 1893 (Carraig Chapbooks No. 3) (Dublin: Sealy, Bryers & Walker, 1894)
- Irish Noíníns (Daisies) (Dublin: Sealy & Bryers, 1894)
- The Fenian Nights' Entertainments (Dublin: T. G. O'Donoghue, 1897)
- Songs of Erinn (London: Simpkin, Marshall, 1899)
- Pulse of the Bards (Cuisle na hÉigse): Songs and Ballads (Dublin: Gill, 1904)
- Irish Fireside Songs (Dublin: Gill, 1911).
- "In the Shadow of Christ Church" [part III], in Dublin Historical Record, vol. 2 no. 3 (March 1940)

== Popular ballads ==
- "Follow Me Up to Carlow"
- "Boolavogue"
- "The Lowlands Low"
- "Kelly the Boy from Killanne".

His manuscript ballad collection is in the National Library of Ireland.
