= Laurence Ambrose Waldron =

Irish MP and Privy Councillor

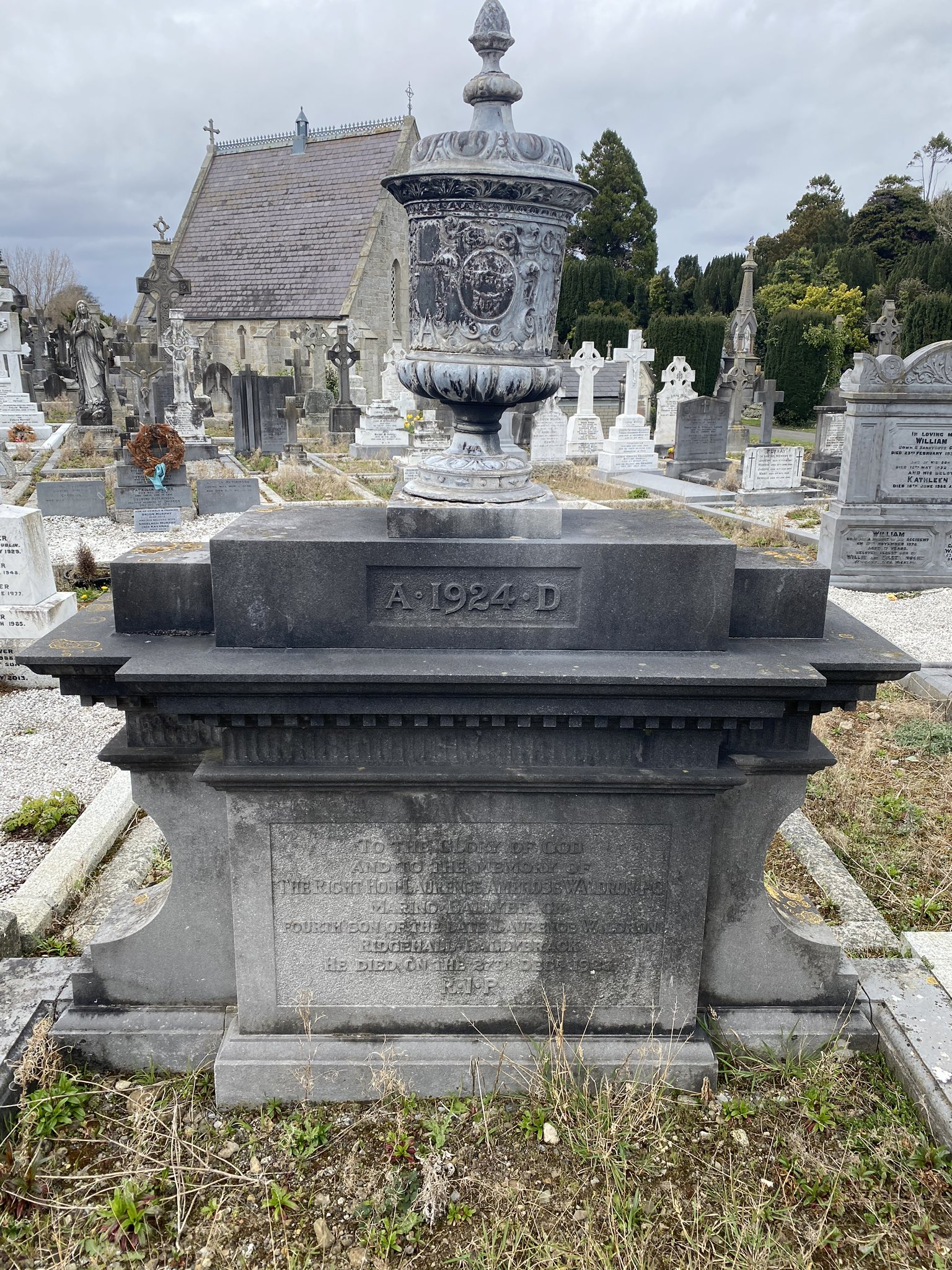
Grave of Waldron

Laurence Ambrose Waldron PC (14 November 1858 – 27 December 1923) was an Irish businessman and politician.

Waldron was the son of Laurence Waldron and Anne White; his father had also been an MP, for County Tipperary. He was educated at the Oratory School.

He was an MP, representing the Irish Parliamentary Party, for Dublin St Stephen's Green, from 21 March 1904 to 15 January 1910.

Laurence was one of eight members of the Irish Privy Council of no less than two years standing who were taxpayers or ratepayers in respect of property in and had residences in Southern Ireland who were elected to the Senate of Southern Ireland established by the Government of Ireland Act 1920, but he resigned before its first meeting.

On 19 May 1920, his head gardener, William J. McCabe, was murdered by an IRA gang at the bottom of Victoria Hill, Killiney.

He died on 27 December 1923 at his residence, Marino, Killiney, County Dublin. Marino is now Abbeylea, the Australian Ambassador's residence, at Marino Road West, bought for £18,000 in 1964.

He is buried in Deans Grange Cemetery.

== Sources ==
- Obituaries in The Times (Saturday, 29 December 1923; pg. 10; Issue 43535; col D) and the Waldron Clan Journal, No. 3 Summer 1997 p. 28.
