= High Sheriff of Down =

Judicial representative in County Down

The High Sheriff of Down is the Sovereign's judicial representative in County Down. Initially an office for lifetime, assigned by the Sovereign, the High Sheriff became annually appointed from the Provisions of Oxford in 1258. Besides his judicial importance, he has ceremonial and administrative functions and executes High Court Writs.

== History ==
The first (High) Shrivalties were established before the Norman Conquest in 1066 and date back to Saxon times. In 1908, an Order in Council made the Lord-Lieutenant the Sovereign's prime representative in a county and reduced the High Sheriff's precedence. Despite however that the office retains his responsibilities for the preservation of law and order in a county.

While the office of High Sheriff ceased to exist in those Irish counties, which had formed the Irish Free State in 1922, it is still present in the counties of Northern Ireland.

== High Sheriffs ==
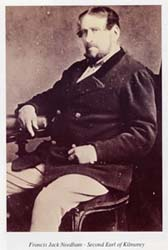
The 2nd Earl of Kilmorey. H.S.1828

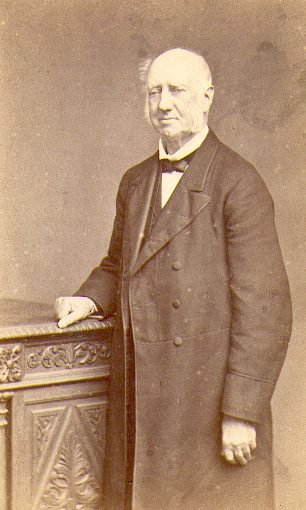
Sir Thomas McClure, 1st Baronet H.S.1864

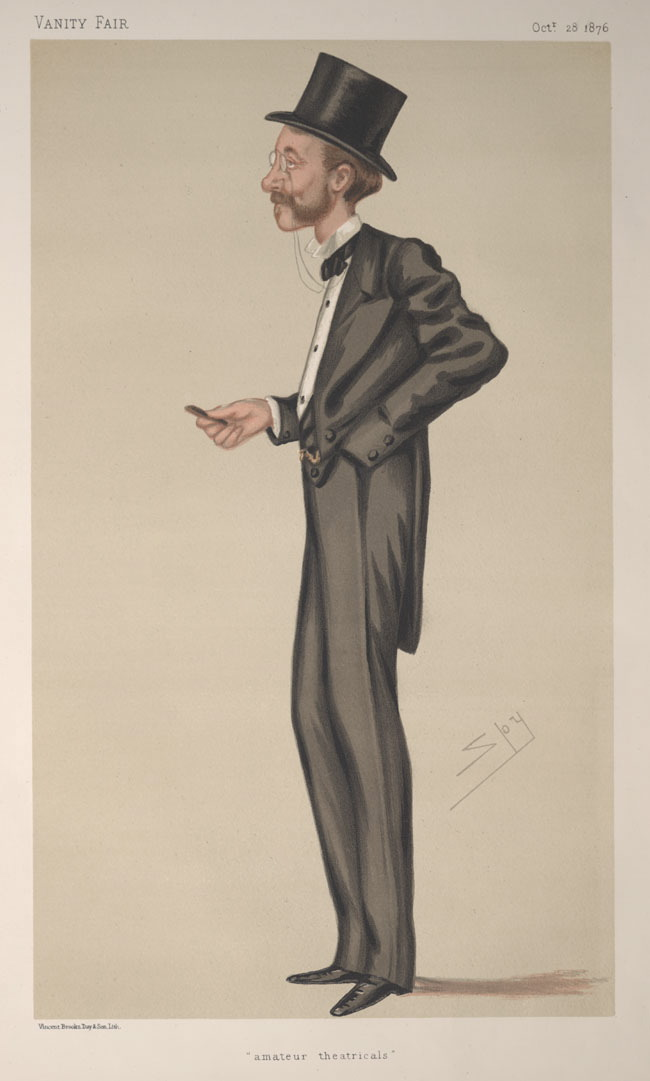
Francis Charles Needham, 3rd Earl of Kilmorey H.S. 1871 Published in Vanity Fair in 1876.

- 1326: John Mandeville
- 1400 Robert Fitz John Savage
- 1570/1 (8 March): Thomas Woulf
- 1579/80 (25 January): Thomas Woulf
- 1585 Thomas Woulf
- 1591 (5 July 1591): Ralph Brereton of Killanleaghe
- 1592-3 Randall or Ralph Brereton of Killanleaghe
- 1600 Timothy Castletown
- 1605 William Ward
- 1607 Edmond Burey
- 1610: Richard West
- 1612: George Stritsbury (Stotisbury)
- 1613: Anthony Hawes
- 1615: Nicholas West
- 1619: Thomas Bands
- 1620: Nicholas West or Ward
- 1621: Piers Rutbergh
- 1622: James Peckham
- 1623: William Hamilton
- 1624: Nicholas West
- 1634: Henry Savage of Ardkeen
- 1638: William Reading
- 1639: William Burley
- 1641: Patrick Shane of Mullogh and Erinagh
- 1642: Peter Hill of Hill Hall
- 1655: James Traile
- 1656: Bernard Ward of Carrignashanagh (now Castle Ward) (son of Nicholas HS 1620)
- 1657: Captain Roger West of Ballydugan (son of Richard HS 1610)
- 1658: Major Richard Bingley
- 1659: John Magill of Gill Hall
- 1660: Ralph Walsh
- 1661: (Sir) Robert Ward of Killough (son of Bernard HS 1656)
- 1662: Nicholas Ward (son of Bernard HS 1656)
- 1663: John Savage of Ardkeen
- 1664 (12 December 1663): James Lesley of Sheepland More or Sheepland Beg, Ardglass (also HS 1680-1)
- 1665 (28 November 1664): William Lesley
- 1665: Francis Aunesley of Cloughmaghericatt (now Clough) or Castlewellan
- 1666: Richard Price of Farinfad
- 1667: Robert Ward
- 1668: William Shaw
- 1669: William Waring of Clanconnel/Waringstown
- 1670: William Montgomery of Rosamon (sic) (Rosemount, Greyabbey)
- 1671: James Ross of Portavo
- 1671/2 (29 January 1671): Francis Annesley of Cloughmaghericatt
- 1673 (11 December 1672): Sir Robert Maxwell, Knight and Baronet of Killileagh
- 1674 (18 December 1673): James Maxwell of Drum
- 1675 (24 December 1674): John Hawkins of Rathfriland
- 1676 (25 November 1675): Randall Bruce/Brice or Beire
- 1677 (13 January 1677): Francis Hall
- 1678 (29 November 1677): Hugh Eccles
- 1679 (23 November 1678): William Brett of Ballynewport
- 1680 (27 November 1679): James Lesley (also HS 1664 & 1681)
- 1681 (25 November 1680): James Lesley (also HS 1664 & 1680)
- 1682 (10 December 1681): Murtagh McGennis/M'Gennis of Greencastle
- 1683 (16 February 1683): Sir Thomas Fortescue
- 1684 (15 December 1683): Patrick Savage of Portaferry
- 1685: Charles Ward
- 1686: Hugh Montgomery
- 1687: Valentine Russell of Coniamnstown, Killough
- 1688:Valentine Russell of Coniamnstown, Killough
- 1689:Richard M'Gennis
- 1690: Bernard Ward (son of Nicholas HS 1662)(killed in duel, 1690)
- 1690: Samuel Waring of Waringstown(son of William, HS 1669)
- 1691: Samuel Waring of Waringstown(son of William, HS 1669)
- 1692: Sir Arthur Rawdom, baronet
- 1693: Richard Johnston
- 1694: Nicholas Price
- 1695: James Montgomery
- 1696: John Gibbons of Ballykinler
- 1697: James Bagley of Inishargy
- 1698: John Montgomery
- 1699: John Haltridge of Dromore

=== 18th century ===
- 1700: John (Hawkins) Magill of Gill Hall
- 1701: Hugh Colvill of Comber
- 1702: Roger Hall of Mount Hall
- 1703: Hercules Montgomery of Ballylesson
- 1704: Nicholas Price of Saintfield
- 1705: Westenra Warren
- 1706: Mathew Forde of Loughinisland or Seaforde
- 1707: John Norris of Newcastle
- 1708: Hans Hamilton
- 1709: Robert Ross of Rosstrevor
- 1710: Robert Johnson
- 1711: Michael Ward of Castle Ward
- 1712: John (Hawkins) Magill of Gill Hall
- 1713: Western Warren
- 1714: Roth Jones of Jonesborough
- 1715: Toby Hall of Mount Hall, Narrow Water
- 1716: Henry Maxwell of Finnebrogue
- 1717: Sir William Johnston of Gilford, Kt
- 1718: Robert Hawkins-Magill of Gill Hall
- 1719: Simon Isaac of Holywood
- 1720: George Lambert of Dunlady
- 1721: James Maxwell of Rubane
- 1722: Cromwell Price of Hollymount, Downpatrick
- 1723: William Montgomery of Rosemount
- 1724: Thomas Waring of Waringstown(son of William, HS 1669)
- 1725: John Baylie of Innishargie House
- 1726: Hon. Thomas Montgomery of Comber
- 1727: Robert Lambert of Dunlady
- 1728: Robert Needham
- 1729: Mathew Forde
- 1730: Edward Bayly of Ringdufferin
- 1731: William Savage
- 1732: Francis Savage
- 1733: John D. Isaac
- 1734: Samuel Waring(son of Samuel, HS 1690)
- 1735: Richard Johnston
- 1736: Arthur Hill-Trevor, 1st Viscount Dungannon
- 1737: Hon. Arthur Hill
- 1738: Hill Willson
- 1739: Francis Hall
- 1740: Roger Hall of Mount Hall
- 1741: James Ross
- 1742: James Echlin
- 1743: Robert Maxwell of Finnebrogue File:Kilruddery.JPG
- 1744: Chichester Fortescue
- 1745: Samuel Hill
- 1746: Bernard Ward
- 1747: Simon Isaac
- 1748: John Bateman
- 1749: Sir John Rawdon
- 1750: Henry Waring
- 1751: William Annesley
- 1752: Mathew Forde (son of Mathew, H.S.1729)
- 1753: Francis Price of Saintfield
- 1754: James Johnston of Tremount
- 1755: William Montgomery
- 1756: John Mathews of Springville
- 1757: Henry William Moore
- 1758: John Echlin of Thomastown, Ardquin
- 1759: Thomas Pottinger
- 1760: Charles Douglass
- 1761: Holt Waring of Waringstown
- 1762: Robert Lambert Tate of Dumladdy
- 1763: Patrick Savage of Portaferry
- 1764: Richard Magenis
- 1765: Sir Richard Johnston, 1st Baronet
- 1766: Nicholas Harrison
- 1767 James Bailie
- 1768: John Moore
- 1769: John Kennedy
- 1770: Charles Savage
- 1771: Robert Ross of Rosstrevor
- 1772: James Waddell
- 1773: Gawen Hamilton of Killyleagh
- 1774: Townley Blackwood
- 1775: Charles Innis
- 1776: John Reilly of Scarvagh
- 1777: Charles Echlin of Echlinville (Rubane)
- 1778: Daniel Delacherois of Donaghadee
- 1779: John Knox of Waringsford
- 1780: Hill Willson
- 1781: Cromwell Price of Hollymount
- 1782: Thomas Dowglass of Grace Hall
- 1783: Hon. Richard Annesley
- 1784: Arthur Johnston of Redemmon
- 1785: Lord Kilwarlin
- 1786: James Arbuckle
- 1787: George Hamilton
- 1788: Sir William Johnston, 2nd Baronet
- 1789: James Watson Hall
- 1790: Robert M'leroth/M'Lewth
- 1791: Francis Savage
- 1792: Hon. Robert Ward
- 1793: Henry Savage
- 1794: H. Vesey Knox
- 1795: Roger Johnston Smith
- 1796: Daniel Mussenden
- 1797: Thomas Waring/Warring (great-grandson of Thomas, HS 1724)
- 1798: Lord Charles FitzGerald
- 1799: Marcus Corry

=== 19th century ===
- 1800: Savage Hall of Narrow Water
- 1801: Nicholas Price of Saintfield
- 1802: Hugh Kennedy
- 1803: Mathew Forde of Seaforde House and Coolgreany
- 1804: Sir James Blackwood (also HS 1813)
- 1805: James Dowsett Rose-Cleland of Rathgill
- 1806: Francis Turnley
- 1807: Ross Thomson
- 1808: Andrew Savage (later Nugent) of Portaferry
- 1809: Robert Bateson
- 1810: John Lushington Reilly of Scarvagh
- 1811: William Sharman Crawford of Crawfordsburn
- 1812: David Gordon
- 1813: James Stevenson Blackwood, 2nd Baron Dufferin and Clandeboye(also HS 1804)
- 1814: Arthur Innis/Innes/Simes/Imes
- 1815: Willam Edmond Reilly of Tamnagharrie
- 1816: Roger Hall
- 1817: J. Waring Maxwell
- 1818: Arthur Johnston Crawford of Rademon
- 1819: Francis Savage of Ardkeen and Hollymount
- 1820: Mathew Forde of Seaforde House
- 1821: Nicholas Delacherois Crommelin of Carrowdore Castle
- 1822: William Richard Annesley, 3rd Earl Annesley
- 1823: Edward Southwell Ward
- 1824: William Montgomery of Grey Abbey
- 1825: John McCance of Drumlough.
- 1826: John H. Houston
- 1827: John Echlin, of Echlinville, Rubane, Kircubbin
- 1828: Francis Jack Needham, commonly called Viscount Newry of Mourne Park, Kilkeel
- 1829: Daniel Delacherois of Donaghadee
- 1830: Nicholas Charles Whyte of Loughbrickland
- 1831: William Mussenden of Larchfield, Downpatrick
- 1832: Arthur Innis of Dromartin
- 1833: Robert Gordon of Florida
- 1834: Earl of Hillsborough
- 1835: Narcissus Batt of Purdysburn
- 1836: Charles Mathew Douglass of Grace Hall
- 1837: David Robert Ross
- 1838: Thomas J. Smith
- 1839: John Sharman Crawford of Crawfordsburn
- 1840: Matthew Forde
- 1841: Sir William Johnston, 2nd Baronet (died 1841)
- 1841: Robert Perceval-Maxwell of Finnebrogue and Groomsport House
- 1842: Robert Edward Ward of Bangor Castle
- 1843: John Patrick Nugent of Portaferry
- 1844: John Reed Allen, of Mount Panther and Dunover, d 14 Apr 1875, son of John Allen of Portaferry, d 2 May 1816, father of George Allen listed below
- 1845: Hugh Montgomery of Rosemount
- 1846: Robert Narcissus Batt of Purdysburn
- 1847: Thomas Morres Hamilton Jones of Moneyglass House, Co Antrim
- 1848: Richard Bayly Blakiston-Houston of Orangefield, Belfast
- 1849: William Keown, of Ballydugan House, Downpatrick
- 1850: Archibald Rowan Hamilton of Killyleagh Castle, Killyleagh.
- 1851: Robert Heron of Ardigon, Killyleagh
- 1852: David Stewart Ker of Montalto
- 1852: Samuel Arthur Hill Delacherois Crommelin of Carradore Castle, Donaghadee
- 1853: William Brownlow Forde of Seaforde, Clough
- 1854: John Temple Reilly of Scarvagh House, Loughbrickland
- 1855: Andrew Mulholland of Springvale, Ballywalter Park
- 1856: Francis Charles Leslie of Ballyward, Rathfriland
- 1857: John Andrews of Uraghmore, Comber
- 1858: Samuel Murland of Woodlands, Castlewellan
- 1859: James Charles Price of Saintfield
- 1860: John Blakiston-Houston of Orangefield and Reddens
- 1861: Alexander John Robert Stewart of Ard-House, Cashelmore.
- 1862: John Joseph Whyte, Colneeran, Loughbrickland
- 1863: Daniel de la Cherois of The Manor House, Donaghadee
- 1864: Thomas McClure of Belmont, Belfast
- 1865: Arthur De Vere Beauclerk of Ardglass Castle, Ardglass
- 1866: John Cleland of Stormont Castle
- 1867: Andrew Savage Nugent of Castle Ward, Strangford, Downpatrick
- 1868: John Mulholland
- 1868: Thomas Waring of Waringstown, in the room of John Mulholland, resigned (grandson of Thomas, HS 1797)
- 1869: Samuel Madden Francis Hall of Narrow Water
- 1870: Arthur Charles Innes of Dromantine, Newry
- 1870: Robert Narcissus Batt of Purdysburn, Belfast
- 1871: Francis Charles Needham, Viscount Newry of Mourne Park, Rostrevor and 6 Waterloo Place, London S.W.
- 1872: Robert Francis Gordon of Florida Manor, Killinchy, and Carlton Club, London, S.W., which gives his year of service as 1873
- 1873: John William Perceval-Maxwell of Finnebrogue, Donaghadee and Tyrella
- 1874 Stephen Roland Woulfe of Tiermaclane, Ennis, Strangford House, County Down and 5 Westbourne Place, Eaton Square, London
- 1875: Gawin William Rowan-Hamilton of Killyleagh
- 1876: Charles Vane-Tempest-Stewart, Viscount Castlereagh of Mount Stewart, Newtownards
- 1877: David Alfred Ker of Montalto and Portavo
- 1878: William James Hall of Narrow Water, Warrenpoint
- 1879: William Cowan Heron of Maryfield, Holywood
- 1880: Richard Ker of Montalto and Portavo
- 1882: Andrew Nugent of Portaferry House
- 1883: Henry Lyle Mulholland, 2nd Baron Dunleath
- 1884: Ogilvie Blair Graham of Larchfield
- 1885: George Allen of Mount Panther and Dunover, d 12 Jun 1929, son of John Reed Allen above
- 1886: Robert Grimshaw Dunville
- 1887: Sir Edward J Harland, Bart. of Ormiston, Strandtown
- 1888: Arthur Johnston Sharman Crawford of Crawfordsburn
- 1889: Sir Edward Porter Cowan of Craig-a-Vall
- 1890: Lieutenant-Colonel McCance of Knocknagoney House, Holywood
- 1891: William Nevin Wallace of Downpatrick and Waterfoot House
- 1893: Victor Coaxes of Glentoran
- 1894: Charles William Dunbar-Buller of Woburn, Co.Down
- 1895: Colonel Robert Gordon Sharman-Crawford of Crawfordsburn
- 1896: Sir Daniel Dixon of Ballymenoch, near Holywood
- 1897: John Percy Meade of Earsham Hall, Bungay, Suffolk and Burrenwood, Castlewellan
- 1899: William James Pirrie of Ormiston, Belfast

=== 20th century ===
- 1900: William Edward Montgomery of Grey Abbey
- 1901: Roger Hall of Narrow Water
- 1902: James Nugent Blackwood-Price of Saintfield House
- 1903: Edwin Hughes of Dalchoulin
- 1904: George Herbert Brown of Tordeevra
- 1905: Andrew Smythe Montague Browne of St. John's Point, Killough
- 1907: John Milne Barbour
- 1908: Robert Hugh Wallace of Myra Castle
- 1909: William George Forde of Seaforde
- 1910: Henry Thompson of Altnaveigh
- 1911: Robert David Perceval-Maxwell of Finnebrogue
- 1913: Viscount Newry and Morne
- 1915: Sir Robert John Kennedy of Cultra Manor, Craigavad
- 1916:
- 1922: Richard Blakiston-Houston of Roddens, Ballywalter
- 1923: Edmond Henry Stuart Nugent of Portaferry House, Portaferry,
- 1924: William Sinclair Kingan of "Glenganagh", Bangor n
- 1925: Major Daniel Dixon, Benvue, Windsor Park, Belfast,
- 1926: Capt. Roger Hall of Narrow Water, Warrenpoint
- 1927: Reynell James Pack-Beresford of Woburn, Donaghadee
- 1928: Alexander Robert Gisborne Gordon of Delamont, Killyleagh
- 1929: J. M. Andrews of Maxwell Court, Comber,
- 1930: Captain Arthur Charles Nugent of The Lodge, Rostrevor, Co. Down
- 1931: Charles Henry George Mulholland, 3rd Baron Dunleath of Ballywalter Park. Ballywalter,
- 1932: Lieut.-Col. Ralph Gore Devereux Groves-Raines of Ardview House, Killinchy,
- 1933: Reverend Edward Hyde Blackwood-Price of Saintfield House, Saintfield,
- 1934: Captain Thomas William Forde, Seaforde,
- 1935: David Wilson Smyth of "The Limes," Malone Park, Belfast
- 1936: Sir David Douglas Reid, Baronet of Rademon, Crossgar
- 1937: Captain John Robert Perceval-Maxwell of Finnebrogue, Downpatrick
- 1938: Sir Roland Thomas Nugent of Portaferry House, Portaferry
- 1939: Major David Allied Wilham Ker of Portavo, Donaghadee
- 1940: Major Robert Workman of Craigdarragh, Helen's Bay,
- 1941: George Ernest Clark of Seapark, Greenisland, Whiteabbey,
- 1942: Major Thomas William Gillilan Johnson Hughes, Dalchoolin, Craigavad,
- 1943: Lt.-Col. Sir Walter Dorling Smiles, Portavoe Point, Donaghadee
- 1944: John Matthew Blakiston-Houston of Reddens, Ballywalter,
- 1945: Colonel Guy James Brownlow of Ballywhite, Portaferry
- 1946: Lieut-Colonel Ogilvie Blair Graham of Larchfield, Lisburn,
- 1947: James Hurst of The Hill, Drumaness, Ballynahinch,
- 1948: Commander Kenneth Clarke Kirkpatrick, Church Hill, Newcastle
- 1949: Derek William Charles Keppel, Viscount Bury of Ros-Cuan
- 1950: Lt.-Col. Desmond Charles Forde of The Lodge, Seaforde
- 1951: Colonel Michael Charles Perceval-Price of Saintfield House, Saintfield
- 1952: Captain David John Richard Ker of Portavo, Donaghadee
- 1953: Edward James Augustus Howard Brush of Drumnabreeze, Maralin
- 1954: Major-General Gerald Ion Gartlan of Cabra House, Newry
- 1955: Major Hugh Edward Montgomery of Greyabbey.
- 1956: Thomas Dickson Ferguson of Ballyvally House, Banbridge.
- 1957: Major Gerard Henry Aubrey Perceval-Maxwell of Ballydugan House, Downpatrick,
- 1958: Thomas John Anthony Kingan of Glenganagh, Bangor,
- 1959: Major William Brownlow of Ballywhite, Portaferry
- 1960: Lieut.-Colonel Sir Charles George Wickham of Ashdene, Comber,
- 1961: Wing Commander Ralph Chevallier Preston of Garden Lodge, Holywood,
- 1962: Lieut-Cmdr James Osborne King of Rademon, Crossgar
- 1963: Lt.-Col. James Dickson Ferguson of Aghaderg Glebe, Loughbrickland, Banbridge
- 1964: William Andrews of Artiara, Comber
- 1965: Major William Charles Mitchell of Murlough, Dundrum.
- 1966: Major David Mitchell Anderson of Creevy Rocks, Saintfield
- 1967: John Corbett of Tyrella House, Downpatrick
- 1968: Gavin Richard Perceval-Maxwell of Groomsport House, Groomsport
- 1969: Commander Robert Graham Lowry of Glasdrumman House, Annalong, Newry.
- 1970: Lieutenant-Colonel James Glencairn Cunningham of Ballytrim, Killyleagh.
- 1971: James Christy Brownlow of Ballydugan House, Downpatrick.
- 1972: Wing Commander John Higginson of Ballyward Lodge, Ballyward, Castlewellan
- 1973: Lt.-Col. F. M. R. Byers of Waterfoot House, Newcastle
- 1974: General Sir John Anderson of Ballyhossett, Downpatrick
- 1975: Denys Archibald Rowan-Hamilton of Killyleagh Castle, Killyleagh
- 1976: Christopher Francis Cecil Lindsay of Mallory, Killyleagh
- 1977: James Robert William Murland of Knocknamorney, Saintfield
- 1978: Archibald Gordon-Pugh of Annalong, Newry
- 1979: Colonel Edgar Donald Reid Shearer of Saltwater Cottage, Finnebrogue, Downpatrick
- 1980: James Hampden Wolfe Pooler of Tullynakill House, Tullynakill Road, Comber, Newtownards
- 1981: John David Maxwell of "Old Court", Castle Street, Strangford
- 1982: William Norman Brann of Drumavaddy
- 1983: W.J. Hall of Castle Espie House, Comber
- 1984: J.E.C. Lewis-Crosby of Marybrook House, Crossgar
- 1985: E.R. Sandford of Portadown
- 1986: P. Forde of Seaforde
- 1987: J. Gorman of Killyleagh
- 1988: H.E. Henshall of Killinchy
- 1989: Richard Patrick Blakiston-Houston
- 1990: D.R.S. Kingan of Hillsborough
- 1991: N.C.W. Clarke of Comber
- 1992: M.W.S. Maclaran of Holywood
- 1993: S.B. Cunningham of Killyleagh
- 1994: M.G.B. Browne of Comber
- 1995: B. David Faulkner of Seaforde
- 1996: William Stephen Brann of Killyleagh
- 1997: Lucinda M. L. Blakiston of Ballywalter
- 1998: Brian Lindsay Henderson of Holywood
- 1999: Margaret E. Crawford of Saintfield

=== 21st century ===
- 2000: Daphne Montgomery of Rosemount, Greyabbey, Newtownards
- 2001: Richard John Gordon, Whiterock Road, Killinchy,
- 2002: Nicholas Edward Lindsay of Mill Point, Finnebrogue, Downpatrick
- 2003: David Graham Shillington of Skeagh Road, Dromore
- 2004: Mary Haughey, Lady Ballyedmond, Ballyedmond Castle, Rostrevor,
- 2005: James Derek Shaw, Elmfield, Gilford
- 2006: Mary Fionnuala Cook of Banbridge
- 2007: John Dudley Francis Fisher, Rathturret, Warrenpoint
- 2008: Alan Raymond Gillespie
- 2009: Lady Augusta Nicholson, Ballyalloly House, Ballyalloly Road, Comber
- 2010: David Corbett, Tyrella House, 90 Clanmaghery Road, Downpatrick
- 2011: Ian Webb, Killymard, Circular Road East, Holywood
- 2012: Anne Frances Mackie of Lisburn
- 2013: Ivan Cunningham
- 2014: Simon Brien
- 2015: Patrick Cross of Downpatrick
- 2016: Philip Baxter of Lisburn
- 2017: Henry John Stewart Catherwood of Holywood
- 2018: Susan Cunningham
- 2019: Henry Shields of Ballynahinch
- 2020: Austin Richard Baird of Holywood
- 2021: Kathleen Mary Spencer of Killinchy
- 2022: James Matthew Smyth of Downpatrick
- 2023: Prof William Michael Mawhinney of Lisburn
- 2024: Suzanne Carol Wild of Comber
- 2025: Peter Hamilton Leckey
- 2026: Dr Ivor Robert Cairns of Royal Hillsborough

== Sources ==
- "High Sheriffs of County Down 1714–1857". Newry and Louth Advertiser, 10/08/1857.
- Hughes, James L. J. (1960). Patentee officers in Ireland, 1173-1826 (PDF). Dublin: Irish Manuscripts Commission. p. 122.
- Montgomery, William (1869). Hill, George (ed.). The Montgomery Manuscripts (1603-1706). Vol. I. Belfast: Archer and Sons.
