= Henry Mulholland, 2nd Baron Dunleath =

Irish Conservative Member of Parliament

The Right Honourable The Lord Dunleath
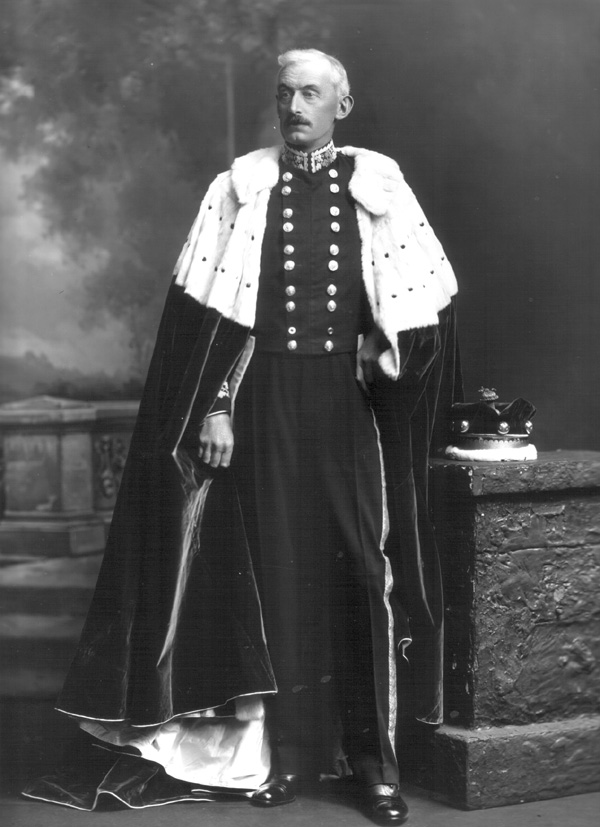
- Lord Dunleath dressed in coronation robes, 1911

Member of Parliament for Londonderry North
- In office 1885–1895
- Preceded by: New constituency
- Succeeded by: John Atkinson

Personal details
- Born: Henry Lyle Mulholland; 30 January 1854
- Died: 22 March 1931 (aged 77)
- Party: Conservative
- Spouse: Norah Louisa Fanny Ward (m. 1881)
- Relations: Charles Mulholland, 4th Baron Dunleath (grandson); Monica Wichfeld (granddaughter); Andrew Mulholland (grandfather)
- Children: 5
- Parent(s): John Mulholland, 1st Baron Dunleath; Frances Louisa Lyle

Henry Lyle Mulholland, 2nd Baron Dunleath (30 January 1854 – 22 March 1931), was an Irish Conservative Member of Parliament.

== Early life ==
Dunleath was the second son of John Mulholland, 1st Baron Dunleath and the former Frances Louisa Lyle (d. 1909). His older brother was the Hon. Andrew Walter Mulholland, who died without issue at age 24 in 1877. His younger siblings included Hon. Alfred John Mulholland (who married Mabel Charlotte Saunderson); Hon. Alice Elizabeth Mulholland (wife of John George Beresford Massy-Beresford and mother to Monica Wichfeld); Hon. Helen Mulholland (wife of Sir George Herbert Murray); and Hon. Louisa Frances Mulholland (wife of Edward Roger Murray Pratt).

His mother was a daughter of Harriet Cromie (a daughter of John Cromie) and Hugh Lyle of Knocktarna in County Londonderry. His father was the eldest son of the former Elizabeth MacDonnell (a daughter of Thomas MacDonnell of Belfast) and Lord Mayor of Belfast Andrew Mulholland of Ballywalter Park. The Mulholland family were prominent in the cotton and linen industry in Ireland.

== Career ==
He served as High Sheriff of Down in 1884. The following year, he was returned to the British House of Commons for Londonderry North, a seat he held until the 1895 general election. Later that year, he succeeded his father in the barony and entered the House of Lords.

== Personal life ==
In 1881, Lord Dunleath was married to Norah Louisa Fanny Ward, the only surviving daughter of Hon. Somerset Richard Hamilton Augustus Ward (fifth son of Edward Ward, 3rd Viscount Bangor), by his wife Norah Mary Elizabeth Hill (only daughter of Lord George Hill, fifth son of Arthur Hill, 2nd Marquess of Downshire). Together, they were the parents of five children, four sons and one daughter, including:

- Hon. Andrew Edward Somerset Mulholland (1882–1914), who married Lady Hester Joan Byng (1888–1976), fifth daughter of the Rev. Francis Byng, 5th Earl of Strafford, in 1913. He was killed in action in the First World War. (Note: Before his early death, his eldest son, Hon. Andrew Mulholland, was the father of one child, Daphne Norah Mulholland (1915–1983), who was born on 11 March 1915, some 4½ months after his death. She married Sir John Guthrie Ward, who served as the British Ambassador to Argentina and Italy.) After his death, his widow remarried to Field Marshal Rudolph Lambart, 10th Earl of Cavan.
- Hon. Eva Norah Helen Mulholland (1884–1972), who married Capt John Vernon Saunderson, a son of Edward James Saunderson, MP.
- Charles Henry George Mulholland, 3rd Baron Dunleath (1886–1956), who married Sylvia Henrietta Brooke, eldest daughter of Sir Arthur Douglas Brooke, 4th Baronet, in 1920. After her death in 1921, he married Henrietta Grace D'Arcy, second daughter of Most Rev. Charles D'Arcy, Archbishop of Armagh and Primate of All Ireland.
- Sir Henry George Hill Mulholland, 1st Baronet (1888–1971), who became Speaker of the House of Commons of Northern Ireland and was created a Baronet in 1945.
- Hon. Godfrey John Arthur Murray Lyle Mulholland (1892–1948), who married Hon. Olivia Vernon Harcourt, a daughter of Lewis Harcourt, 1st Viscount Harcourt and Mary Harcourt, Viscountess Harcourt. Olivia served as Woman of the Bedchamber to Queen Elizabeth the Queen Mother.

Lord Dunleath died on 22 March 1931, aged 77, and was succeeded in the barony by his second son Charles. Lady Dunleath died in 1935.

=== Descendants ===
Through his second son, he was a grandfather of Charles Mulholland, 4th Baron Dunleath (1933–1993).

=== Sailing ===
He inherited the schooner Egeria from his father, and had the Charles E Nicholson designed 4 ton lugger Wolfhound built for him at Camper and Nicholsons, Gosport in 1893.

Parliament of the United Kingdom
New constituency	Member of Parliament for Londonderry North; 1885–1895	Succeeded by John Atkinson
Peerage of the United Kingdom
Preceded by John Mulholland	Baron Dunleath; 1895–1931	Succeeded by Charles Henry George Mulholland
