= Richard Ker (MP) =

Irish landowner and politician (1850–1942)

Member of Parliament for Down East
- In office 1885-1890

Member of Parliament for Down
- In office 1884-1885 Serving with Lord Arthur Hill

Personal details
- Born: 30 November 1850
- Died: 19 June 1942 (aged 91)
- Spouse: Edith Rose
- Children: 1+
- Parent: David Stewart Ker (father)
- Relatives: Richard Ker (uncle); David Guardi Ker (grandfather)
- Military career
- Rank: Captain
- Unit: 1st Royal Dragoons

Richard William Blackwood Ker (30 November 1850 – 19 June 1942) was an Irish landowner and MP.

== Biography ==
He was the son of David Stewart Ker and his wife, Anna Dorothea Blackwood. He was a captain in the 1st Royal Dragoons. He inherited his father's estates of Montalto and Portavo at Ballynahinch on the death of his elder brother, David Alfred Ker.

He was appointed Sheriff of County Down for 1880–81 and was the Member of Parliament for County Down, 1884–1885 and for East Down, 1885–1890. He has been described as 'a substantial landowner from Ballynahinch.'

He married Edith Louisa, the daughter of William Rose of Warwickshire and had at least one son, who was an officer in the army.

Parliament of the United Kingdom
Preceded by Lord Arthur Hill; Viscount Castlereagh	Member of Parliament for Down; 1884 – 1885; With: Lord Arthur Hill 1884–1885	Constituency abolished
New constituency	Member of Parliament for Down East; 1885–1890	Succeeded by James Alexander Rentoul
