= Edward Southwell Ruthven =

Irish politician

Edward Southwell Ruthven (c. 1772 – 31 March 1836) was an Irish Repealer politician and member of the United Kingdom Parliament.

He was a Member for Downpatrick 1806-7 and 1830–1832, MP for Dublin City (Repealer) 1832–1835 and (Liberal Repealer) January 1835 – 13 April 1835 (when he was unseated on petition).

His daughter Elizabeth married Reverend Francis Stainforth. His son, Edward Ruthven, was MP for Kildare, 1832–1837.

Parliament of the United Kingdom
Preceded by Charles Stewart Hawthorne	Member of Parliament for Downpatrick; 1806 – 1807	Succeeded by John Wilson Croker
Preceded by John Waring Maxwell	Member of Parliament for Downpatrick; 1830 – 1832	Succeeded by John Waring Maxwell
Preceded by Sir Frederick Shaw, 3rd Baronet; Viscount Ingestre	Member of Parliament for Dublin City; 1832 – 1835; With: Daniel O'Connell	Succeeded by George Alexander Hamilton; John Beattie West
