= David Stewart Ker =

Irish landowner and politician

Member of Parliament for Downpatrick
- In office 1841-1847; 1859-1867

Member of Parliament for Down
- In office 1852-1857 Serving with Lord Arthur Hill-Trevor

Personal details
- Born: November 1816
- Died: 8 October 1878 (aged 61)
- Spouse(s): Anna Dorothea; Caroline Persse
- Children: 13, including Richard
- Parent: David Guardi Ker (father)
- Relatives: Richard Ker (brother); Robert Stewart (grandfather); Robert Stewart (uncle); John Waring Maxwell (uncle)

David Stewart Ker (November 1816 – 8 October 1878) was an Irish landowner and politician.

== Biography ==
He was a son of David Guardi Ker, MP for Athlone 1820–1826 and Downpatrick 1835–1841, and Selina Sarah, daughter of the first Marquess of Londonderry, and the elder brother of Richard Ker, Member of Parliament for Downpatrick, 1847-1851 and 1857–1859.

He was a member of the landed gentry, inheriting the estates at Montalto and Portavo, Ballynahinch on his father's death in 1844. He served as a magistrate, deputy lieutenant and High Sheriff of County Down for 1852 and High Sheriff of Antrim for 1857.

He was elected the Member of Parliament for Downpatrick, 1841–1847 and 1859-1867 and for County Down, 1852–1857.

== Personal life ==
He married twice: firstly Anna Dorothea, the daughter of Hans Blackwood, 3rd Baron Dufferin and Claneboye with whom he had 12 children and secondly Caroline Persse from Galway (who ran off with his son Charley).

He was buried in Magheradrool Church of Ireland graveyard and succeeded by his eldest son, Alfred David Ker. After his death the estates passed to another son, Richard Ker.

Parliament of the United Kingdom
Preceded by David Guardi Ker	Member of Parliament for Downpatrick; 1841 – 1847	Succeeded by Richard Ker
Preceded by Frederick Stewart, Viscount Castlereagh; Lord Arthur Hill-Trevor	Member of Parliament for Down; 1852 – 1857; With: Lord Arthur Hill-Trevor	Succeeded by Lord Arthur Hill-Trevor; William Brownlow Forde
Preceded by Richard Ker	Member of Parliament for Downpatrick; 1859–1867	Succeeded by William Keown
