= Owen Roberts (aviator) =

British Royal Air Force officer and aviator

- Born: George Marshall Endicott Roberts; 17 September 1912; London, England
- Died: 10 April 1953 (aged 40); Kingston, Jamaica
- Cause of death: Plane crash
- Spouse: Patricia Charles (m. 1936)
- Children: 2
- Relatives: John Crichton, 7th Earl Erne (grandson); Marshall Owen Roberts (grandfather); Sir George Murray (grandfather)

Owen Roberts (also known as "The Commander") (17 September 1912 – 10 April 1953) was a British Royal Air Force officer, aviator and founder of Caribbean International Airways.

== Early life ==
George Marshall Endicott Roberts was born on 17 September 1912 in London. He was a son of the Irene Helene née Murray (1882–1972) and Marshall Owen Roberts (1878–1931), an American who became a British subject.

His paternal grandparents were wealthy American businessman Marshall Owen Roberts, and the former Sarah Lawrence "Susan" Endicott. His maternal grandparents were Sir George Murray (great-grandson of the Lord George Murray, second son of John Murray, 3rd Duke of Atholl) and the former Helen Mary Mulholland (a daughter of 1st Baron Dunleath).

== Career ==
Roberts flew with the RAF and was a wing commander during World War II.

ST-12 Monospar G-ADLL was purchased by Captain Owen Roberts who entered it into the King Cup air race of 1935 and was placed 19th out of 20. Painted all gold it undertook a world tour and flew across America to California. Eventually it returned bearing the many flags of the countries it had traversed. The plane was kept by Capt Roberts until it was impressed into service at the outbreak of war as X9431. It first went to No-110 Wing (Anti-Aircraft Co-operation Unit) where the gold paint was replaced with camouflage paint. In May 1940 it was allocated to Ringway where it was employed with No-7 AACU.

Following the war, Roberts co-founded Caribbean International Airways (CIA). By 1950, Roberts had established regular service between Cayman and Tampa, Florida; Kingston, Jamaica; and Belize. He worked to lobby Cayman Islands Commissioners Ivor Smith and Andrew Gerrard to build airfields on all three of the Cayman Islands. In 1952, construction started on an official airstrip at an estimated cost of £93,000. On 28 November 1952 with a crowd of several hundred onlookers, Roberts piloted a PBY Catalina to a perfect landing on the partially completed airport runway. Within six months after that landing, Roberts had acquired two used Lockheed Lodestar airliners purchased to keep up with the competition whose interest was now piqued by the soon-to-be completed airfield at George Town.

== Personal life and death ==
In 1936, Roberts was married to Patricia Charles, they had two daughters who lived in London. During a CIA flight from Kingston to Grand Cayman on 10 April 1953, the Lodestar piloted by Roberts crashed on takeoff from Palisadoes Airport, killing thirteen of the fourteen people on board, including Roberts and his sister, Angela. The only survivor of the crash was Roberts' brother-in-law, Lt.-Col. Edward Remington-Hobbs.

=== Legacy ===
Owen Roberts International Airport in George Town on Grand Cayman in the Cayman Islands is named after him.
