= George Murray (civil servant) =

British civil servant

The Right Honourable Sir George Murray GCB GCVO ISO
- Sir George Murray in 1915

Secretary to the General Post Office
- In office 1899–1903
- Preceded by: Sir Spencer Walpole
- Succeeded by: Henry Babington-Smith

Principal Private Secretary to the Prime Minister
- In office 1894–1895
- Prime Minister: Archibald Primrose
- Preceded by: Algernon West
- Succeeded by: Schomberg Kerr McDonnell

Personal details
- Born: George Herbert Murray; 27 September 1849 Southfleet, Kent, England
- Died: 4 April 1936 (aged 86)
- Spouse: Hon. Helen Mary Mulholland (m. 1879; died 1932)
- Relations: George Murray (grandfather); Owen Roberts (grandson)
- Children: 2
- Parent: George Edward Murray
- Education: Harrow School
- Alma mater: Christ Church, Oxford
- Awards: CB (1894); KCB (1899); ISO (1904); GCB (1908); GCVO (1920)

Sir George Herbert Murray GCB GCVO ISO PC (27 September 1849 – 4 April 1936) was a British civil servant.

== Early life ==
Murray was born in Southfleet, Kent, England, the son of and Penelope Frances Elizabeth Pemberton Austin (the daughter of Brigadier-General Austin) and the Reverend George Edward Murray, the village's rector.

He was also a grandson of the Right Reverend George Murray, Bishop of Rochester (who married Lady Sarah Hay-Drummond, daughter of Robert Hay-Drummond, 10th Earl of Kinnoull), a great-grandson of the Right Reverend Lord George Murray (who was second son of John Murray, 3rd Duke of Atholl, himself the eldest son of renowned Scottish Jacobite Lord George Murray, the sixth son of John Murray, 1st Duke of Atholl).

He was educated at Harrow School and Christ Church, Oxford.

== Career ==
He entered the Foreign Office in 1873 and transferred to HM Treasury in 1880. From 1892 to 1894 he was private secretary to Prime Minister William Ewart Gladstone in his role as First Lord of the Treasury, and became principal private secretary to his successor, Lord Rosebery, until 1895.

In 1897, Murray was appointed chairman of the Board of Inland Revenue. In 1899 he became secretary to the General Post Office and in 1903 returned to the Treasury as Joint Permanent Secretary, in charge of administrative matters while Sir Edward Hamilton handled the financial affairs. On Hamilton's retirement in October 1907, Murray became sole permanent secretary. In 1909, Murray was involved in lobbying various Crossbench peers in the House of Lords to reject the Chancellor of the Exchequer's proposed budget. On 19 July 1910 he was appointed to the Privy Council, entitling him to the style "The Right Honourable". He retired on 23 July 1911.

From 1914, Murray played a prominent part in the management of the Prince of Wales's Fund. In 1915 he became chairman of the committee on the employment of soldiers and sailors disabled in the war. He was also a member of the Haldane Committee, which reported on the machinery of government in 1918

== Personal life ==
On 23 September 1879, he was married to the Honourable Helen Mary Mulholland, a daughter of John Mulholland, 1st Baron Dunleath, and granddaughter of Lord Mayor of Belfast Andrew Mulholland. Together, they were the parents of:

- Sir George Evelyn Pemberton Murray (1880–1947), who also became secretary to the Post Office, the last person to hold the office. He married Muriel Mildred Elizabeth Beresford-Hope, daughter of Philip Beresford-Hope (a son of Sir Alexander Beresford Hope and Lady Mildred, eldest daughter of James Gascoyne-Cecil, 2nd Marquess of Salisbury), in 1906.
- Irene Helen Murray (born 1882), who married Captain Marshall Owen Roberts, a son of the wealthy American businessman Marshall Owen Roberts, in 1903. They divorced in 1921.

Lady Murray died on 19 February 1932. Sir George died on 4 April 1936.

=== Descendants ===
Through his son, he was a grandfather of Lieutenant-Colonel George Anthony Murray (1907–1945), who was killed in action in World War II. He married the Honourable Angela Pearson (a daughter of Harold Pearson, 2nd Viscount Cowdray, and Agnes Beryl Spencer-Churchill, granddaughter of George Spencer-Churchill, 6th Duke of Marlborough). Their son, George Iain Murray, inherited the Dukedom of Atholl in 1957.

Through his daughter, he was a grandfather of Owen George Endicott Roberts, a Royal Air Force wing commander and aviator who founded the Caribbean International Airways; and Angela Susan Roberts, who married three times: first to Lieutenant-Colonel the Honourable Somerset Arthur Maxwell (son of Arthur Maxwell, 11th Baron Farnham) in 1930, second to Lieutenant-Commander Henry Harrison Proctor (a son of Charles A. Proctor) in 1944, and third to Lieutenant-Colonel Edward Remington-Hobbs in 1950.

== Honours ==
Murray was appointed Companion of the Order of the Bath (CB) in 1894 and Knight Commander of the Order of the Bath (KCB) in the 1899 Birthday Honours, shortly after joining the Post Office. He was appointed to the Imperial Service Order (ISO) in 1904, and was appointed Knight Grand Cross of the Order of the Bath (GCB) in the 1908 Birthday Honours and Knight Grand Cross of the Royal Victorian Order (GCVO) in the 1920 New Year Honours.

Government offices
Preceded by Algernon West	Principal Private Secretary to the Prime Minister; 1894–1895	Succeeded by Schomberg Kerr McDonnell
Preceded by Sir Alfred Milner	Chairman of the Board of Inland Revenue; 1897–1899	Succeeded by Sir Henry Primrose
Preceded by Sir Spencer Walpole	Secretary to the General Post Office; 1899–1903	Succeeded by Henry Babington-Smith
Preceded by Sir Francis Mowatt	Permanent Secretary to the Treasury; 1903–1911 with Sir Edward Hamilton (1903–1907)	Succeeded by Sir Robert Chalmers
Preceded by Sir Edward Hamilton (jointly 'til 1907)	Permanent Secretary to the Treasury; 1903–1911 with Sir Edward Hamilton (1903–1907)	Succeeded by Sir Robert Chalmers
