= Henry Mulholland =

Henry Mulholland is the name of:

- Henry Mulholland, 2nd Baron Dunleath (1854–1931), Irish Conservative Member of Parliament
- His son Sir Henry Mulholland, 1st Baronet (1888–1971), Northern Ireland politician
