= William Keown =

Irish politician

William Keown MP

Member of Parliament for Downpatrick
- In office 5 August 1867 – 3 February 1874
- Preceded by: David Stewart Ker
- Succeeded by: John Mulholland

Personal details
- Born: 1816
- Died: 19 January 1877 (aged 60)
- Party: Conservative

William Keown (1816 – 19 January 1877), known as William Keown-Boyd from 1873, was an Irish Conservative politician.

He was elected as the Member of Parliament (MP) for Downpatrick at a by-election in 1867 and held the seat until the 1874 general election.

Parliament of the United Kingdom
Preceded by David Stewart Ker	Member of Parliament for Downpatrick; 1867 – 1874	Succeeded by John Mulholland
