= Edward Walter Hamilton =

British political diarist and political secretary (1847-1908)

The Right Honourable Sir Edward Walter Hamilton GCB GCVO ISO
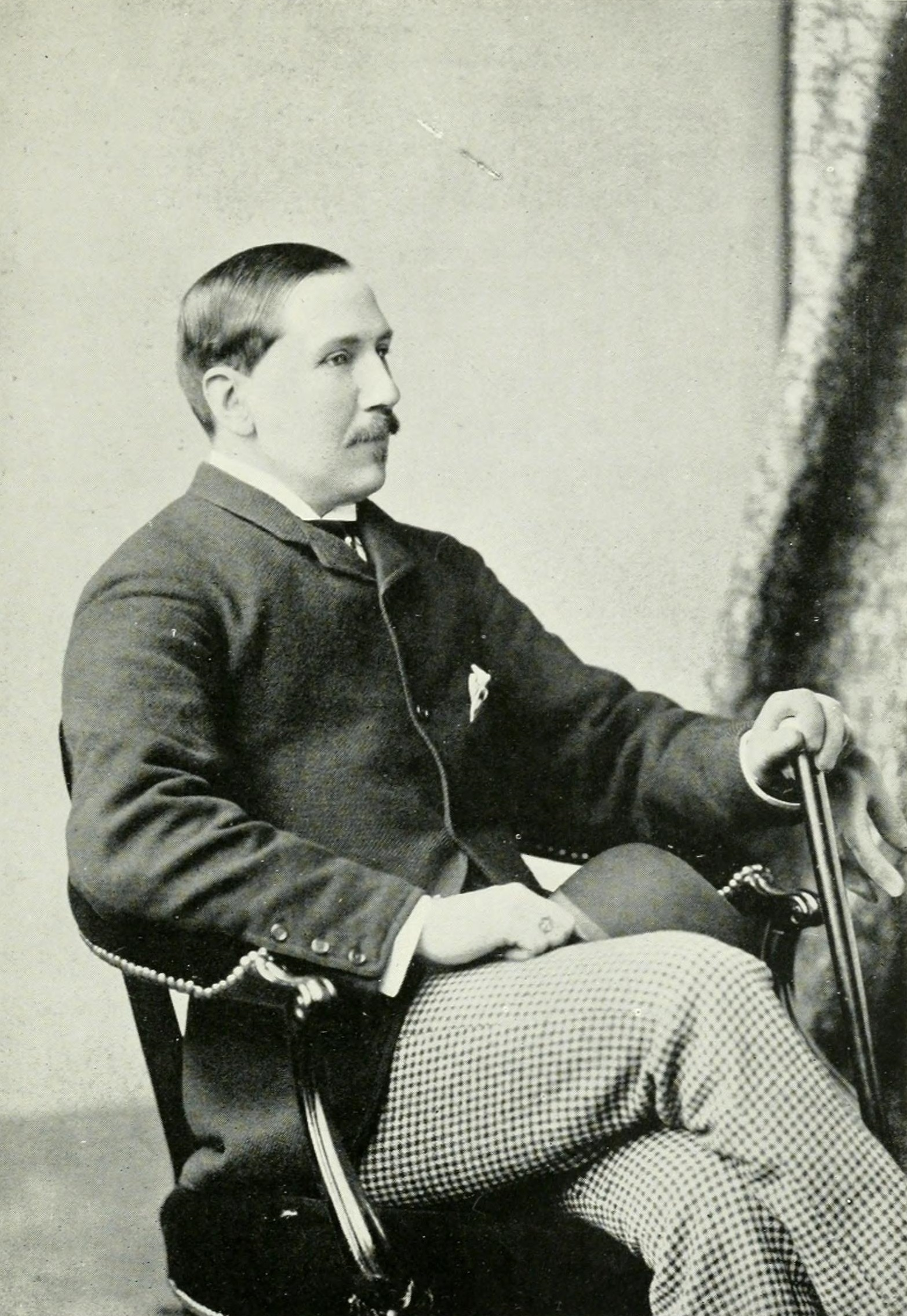

Joint Permanent Secretary to the Treasury
- In office 1902–1908
- Monarch: Victoria
- Preceded by: Ralph Lingen, 1st Baron Lingen
- Succeeded by: George Murray (civil servant)

Personal details
- Born: 7 July 1847
- Died: 2 September 1908 (aged 61)
- Education: Eton College

Sir Edward Walter Hamilton, GCB GCVO ISO (7 July 1847 – 2 September 1908), also known as Eddy Hamilton, was a British political diarist and Joint Permanent Secretary to the Treasury.

== Biography ==
Hamilton was the eldest son of Walter Kerr Hamilton (1808–1869), Bishop of Salisbury, and was educated at Eton from 1860 to 1865. He matriculated at Christ Church, Oxford on 20 January 1866, where he took a Class III in Classical Moderations (Greek and Latin), and received a B.Mus. in 1867.

He entered the Treasury in 1870, and was private secretary to the Chancellor of the Exchequer, Robert Lowe, 1872–73. In that year he was appointed private secretary to William Ewart Gladstone who was prime minister until 1874, and also served as such 1880-85 when Gladstone was prime minister for the second time. Following Gladstone's defeat in 1885, Hamilton was appointed by the new prime minister, the Tory Lord Salisbury to a position in the Treasury. Hamilton became a pillar of the Victorian establishment during various appointments through the years. On his arrival in 1885 he was appointed principal clerk in the Finance Division, and in 1892 he became Assistant Financial Secretary. Two years later, he advanced to Assistant Secretary to the Treasury for financial business. In October 1902 he was appointed a Joint Permanent Secretary to the Treasury, and continued as such until his death.

Hamilton was appointed a Companion of the Order of the Bath (CB) in 1885, was knighted and promoted a Knight Commander of the Order of the Bath (KCB) in 1894, and received the Knight Grand Cross of the Order of the Bath (GCB) in the 1906 Birthday Honours. He also received the Imperial Service Order (ISO) in 1904. For his services to the monarchy, King Edward VII appointed him a Knight Commander of the Royal Victorian Order (KCVO) in July 1901, and he was promoted to Knight Grand Cross (GCVO) in 1907.

While Hamilton always retained strong links to Gladstone and his family, politically he was closer to Gladstone's successor Lord Rosebery to whom he was a close friend and Eton contemporary.

Hamilton published a book on Gladstone, and a volume dealing with the National Debt. He also published a diary of political gossip under the pseudonym "Nemo" (Latin for "no man" or "no one"). He was an amateur musician and published several of his compositions.

Hamilton died unmarried on 3 September 1908, and was buried in Brighton cemetery.

== Works ==
- Conversion and Redemption: an Account of the Operations under the National Debt Conversion Act, 1889 (London: Eyre and Spottiswoode, 1889).
- Mr. Gladstone (London: John Murray, 1898).
- The Diary of Sir Edward Walter Hamilton, 1880–1885, ed. D. W. R. Bahlman, 2 vols. (Oxford: Clarendon Press, 1972).
- The Destruction of Lord Rosebery: From the Diary of Sir Edward Hamilton, 1894–1895, ed. David Brooks (Historian's Press, 1986).
- The Diary of Sir Edward Walter Hamilton, 1885–1906, ed. D. W. R. Bahlman (University of Hull Press, 1993).

== Notes ==
Government offices
Preceded by Sir Ralph Lingen	Permanent Secretary to the Treasury; 1902–1907 with Sir Francis Mowatt (1894–1903); Sir George Murray (1903–1907)	Succeeded by Sir George Murray
