= William Hall (Lord Lieutenant) =

Northern Irish businessman (born 1934)

Sir William Joseph Hall, KCVO, KStJ (born 1 August 1934) is a Northern Irish businessman, farmer and public servant.

Born in 1934, Hall spent four years in the Irish Guards before joining W. C. Pitfield & Co. in 1956; he went on to work for Shell until 1962, when he set up his own wine wholesale business and began farming.

In 1973, Hall became a magistrate for County Down. He was appointed a deputy lieutenant in 1975 and was High Sheriff for the year 1983–84. He was Vice Lord Lieutenant from 1993 to 1996, and then served as Lord Lieutenant from 1996 to 2009. He was appointed a Knight Commander of the Royal Victorian Order in the 2009 Birthday Honours. On 25 May 2011 Sir William was appointed as Knight of the Most Venerable Order of the Hospital of Saint John of Jerusalem.
