= Brian Mulholland, 6th Baron Dunleath =

Irish hereditary peer (born 1950)

Brian Henry Mulholland, 6th Baron Dunleath, DL (born 25 September 1950), is a Northern Irish hereditary peer and former politician. His ancestral seat is Ballywalter Park, a country house at Ballywalter on the Ards in County Down.

== Life ==
Lord Dunleath was educated at Eton College.

In 1997 he succeeded to the title of Baron Dunleath and took his seat in the House of Lords. He also succeeded as 3rd Baronet Mulholland of Ballyscullion. Dunleath was excluded from the House in 1999 with most of the other hereditary peers with the House of Lords Act 1999. He is a Deputy Lieutenant of County Down.

== Sources ==
Peerage of the United Kingdom
Preceded by Michael Mulholland	Baron Dunleath; 1997–present Member of the House of Lords (1997–1999)	Incumbent; Heir apparent: Hon. Andrew Mulholland
