= Richard Ker =

Irish politician and cricketer

Member of Parliament for Downpatrick
- In office 1847-1851; 1857-1859

Personal details
- Born: 21 July 1822
- Died: 18 December 1890 (aged 68) South Kensington, England
- Party: Peelite Conservative
- Parent: David Guardi Ker (father)
- Relatives: David Stewart Ker (brother); Robert Stewart (grandfather); Robert Stewart (uncle); John Waring Maxwell (uncle)
- Education: Corpus Christi College, Oxford

Richard John Charles Rivers Ker (21 July 1822 – 18 December 1890) was an Irish politician and first-class cricketer.

== Biography ==
He was a son of David Guardi Ker, MP for Athlone 1820-1826 and Downpatrick 1835-1841, and Selina Sarah, daughter of the first Marquess of Londonderry, and the younger brother of David Stewart Ker, the Member of Parliament for Downpatrick, 1841-1847 and 1859-1867 and one of the Members of Parliament for County Down, 1852-1857 He was educated in England at Eton College, before going up to Corpus Christi College, Oxford. While studying at Oxford, he made three appearances in first-class cricket for Oxford University in 1841–2, playing twice against the Marylebone Cricket Club and once in The University Match against Cambridge.

He was elected as a Peelite Conservative Member of Parliament for Downpatrick in 1847, resigning through appointment as Steward of the Chiltern Hundreds on 1 August 1851. He was again elected in an 1857 by-election for the same seat, but did not stand in the 1859 general election. Ker died in England at South Kensington in December 1890.

Parliament of the United Kingdom
Preceded by David Stewart Ker	Member of Parliament for Downpatrick; 1847–1851	Succeeded by Charles Hardinge
Preceded by Charles Hardinge	Member of Parliament for Downpatrick; 1857–1859	Succeeded by David Stewart Ker
