= Viscount Hardinge =

Title in the Peerage of the United Kingdom

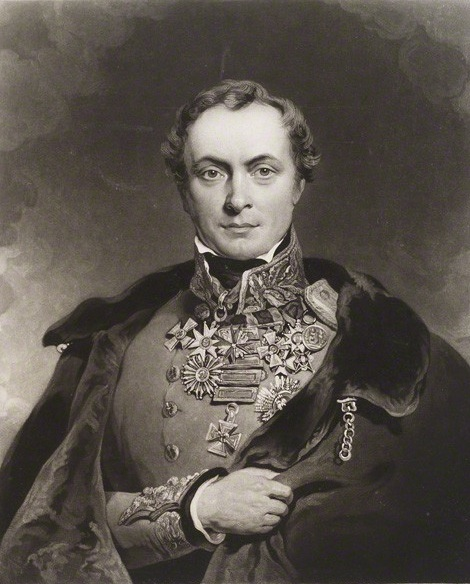
Henry Hardinge, 1st Viscount Hardinge

Viscount Hardinge, of Lahore and of Kings Newton in the County of Derby, is a title in the Peerage of the United Kingdom. It was created in 1846 for the soldier and Tory politician Sir Henry Hardinge. His son, the second Viscount, represented Downpatrick in Parliament. His great-great-grandson, the sixth Viscount, succeeded a distant relative as eighth Baronet, of Belle Isle in the County of Fermanagh, in 1986. This title had been created in the Baronetage of the United Kingdom 1801 for Richard Hardinge. He was the third son of Nicolas Hardinge, younger brother of Reverend Henry Hardinge and uncle of the latter's third son Henry Hardinge, 1st Viscount Hardinge. The baronetcy was created with special remainder to the heirs male of Richard Hardinge's father.

Another member of the Hardinge family was the diplomat Charles Hardinge, 1st Baron Hardinge of Penshurst. He was the second son of the second Viscount Hardinge. George Nicholas Hardinge was an officer of the Royal Navy, second son of Reverend Henry Hardinge and elder brother of the first Viscount.

The family seat is Broadmere House, near Basingstoke, Hampshire.

== Viscounts Hardinge (1846) ==
Escutcheon of the Viscounts Hardinge

- Henry Hardinge, 1st Viscount Hardinge (1785–1856)
- Charles Hardinge, 2nd Viscount Hardinge (1822–1894)
- Henry Charles Hardinge, 3rd Viscount Hardinge (1857–1924)
- Caryl Nicholas Charles Hardinge, 4th Viscount Hardinge (1905–1979)
- Henry Nicholas Paul Hardinge, 5th Viscount Hardinge (1929–1984)
- Charles Henry Nicholas Hardinge, 6th Viscount Hardinge, 8th Baronet (1956–2004)
- Andrew Hartland Hardinge, 7th Viscount Hardinge, 9th Baronet (1960–2014)
- Thomas Henry de Montarville Hardinge, 8th Viscount Hardinge, 10th Baronet (born 1993)

The heir presumptive is the present holder's brother Hon. Jamie Alexander David Hardinge (born 1996).

== Hardinge Baronets, of Belle Isle (1801) ==
- Sir Richard Hardinge, 1st Baronet (1756–1826)
- Sir Charles Hardinge, 2nd Baronet (1780–1864)
- Sir Henry Charles Hardinge, 3rd Baronet (1830–1873)
- Sir Edmund Stracey Hardinge, 4th Baronet (1833–1924)
- Sir Charles Edmund Hardinge, 5th Baronet (1878–1968)
- Sir Robert Hardinge, 6th Baronet (1887–1973)
- Sir Robert Arnold Hardinge, 7th Baronet (1914–1986)
- Sir Charles Henry Nicholas Hardinge, 8th Baronet (1956–2004) (had already succeeded as Viscount Hardinge in 1984)

for further succession, see above

== See also ==
- Baron Hardinge of Penshurst

== Notes ==
Baronetage of the United Kingdom
Preceded by Chatterton baronets	Hardinge baronets of Boundes Park; 4 August 1801	Succeeded by Judkin-Fitzgerald baronets
