= Charles Hardinge, 2nd Viscount Hardinge =

British politician (1822–1894)

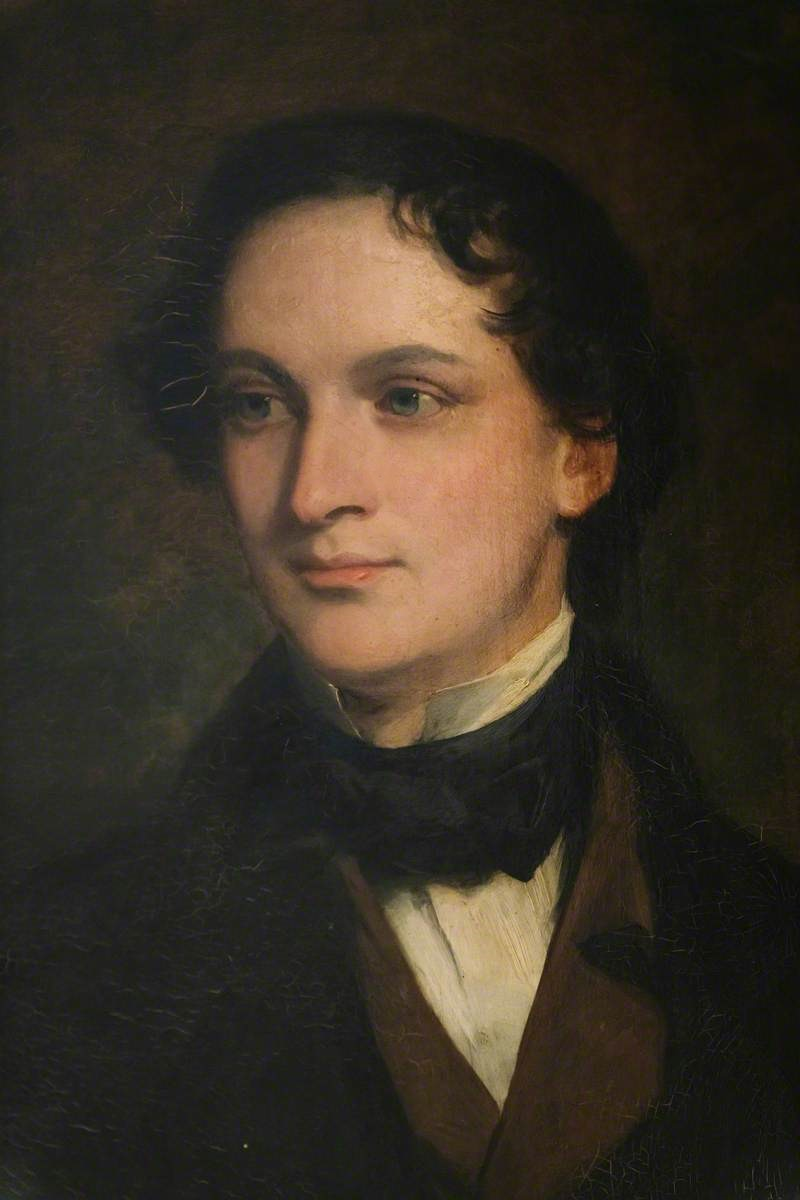
Portrait of Charles Hardinge, ca. 1850, by Francis Grant

Charles Stewart Hardinge, 2nd Viscount Hardinge (2 September 1822 – 28 July 1894), was a British Conservative politician.

Hardinge was the son of Field Marshal Henry Hardinge, 1st Viscount Hardinge, and Lady Emily Jane Stewart, daughter of Robert Stewart, 1st Marquess of Londonderry. Hardinge was elected Member of Parliament for Downpatrick in 1851, a seat he held until 1856, when he succeeded his father in the viscountcy and entered the House of Lords. He held office as Under-Secretary of State for War from March 1858 to March 1859 in the Second Derby-Disraeli ministry.

He was aged 21, when he went to India as private secretary to his father, the then, governor general, from July 1844 to January 1848.

He was appointed major of the Kent Militia Artillery when it was formed in 1853, and the unit was embodied for home defence during the Crimean War.

Lord Hardinge married Lady Lavinia, daughter of George Bingham, 3rd Earl of Lucan, in 1856. They had five sons and three daughters. Their second son the Hon. Charles was raised to the peerage in his own right as Baron Hardinge of Penshurst in 1910. Lady Hardinge died in September 1864, shortly after the birth of her youngest child. Lord Hardinge remained a widower until his death in July 1894, aged 71. He was succeeded in the viscountcy by his eldest son, Henry.

Hardinge authored the biography of his father, Sir Henry Hardinge in 1891 for the Rulers of India series.

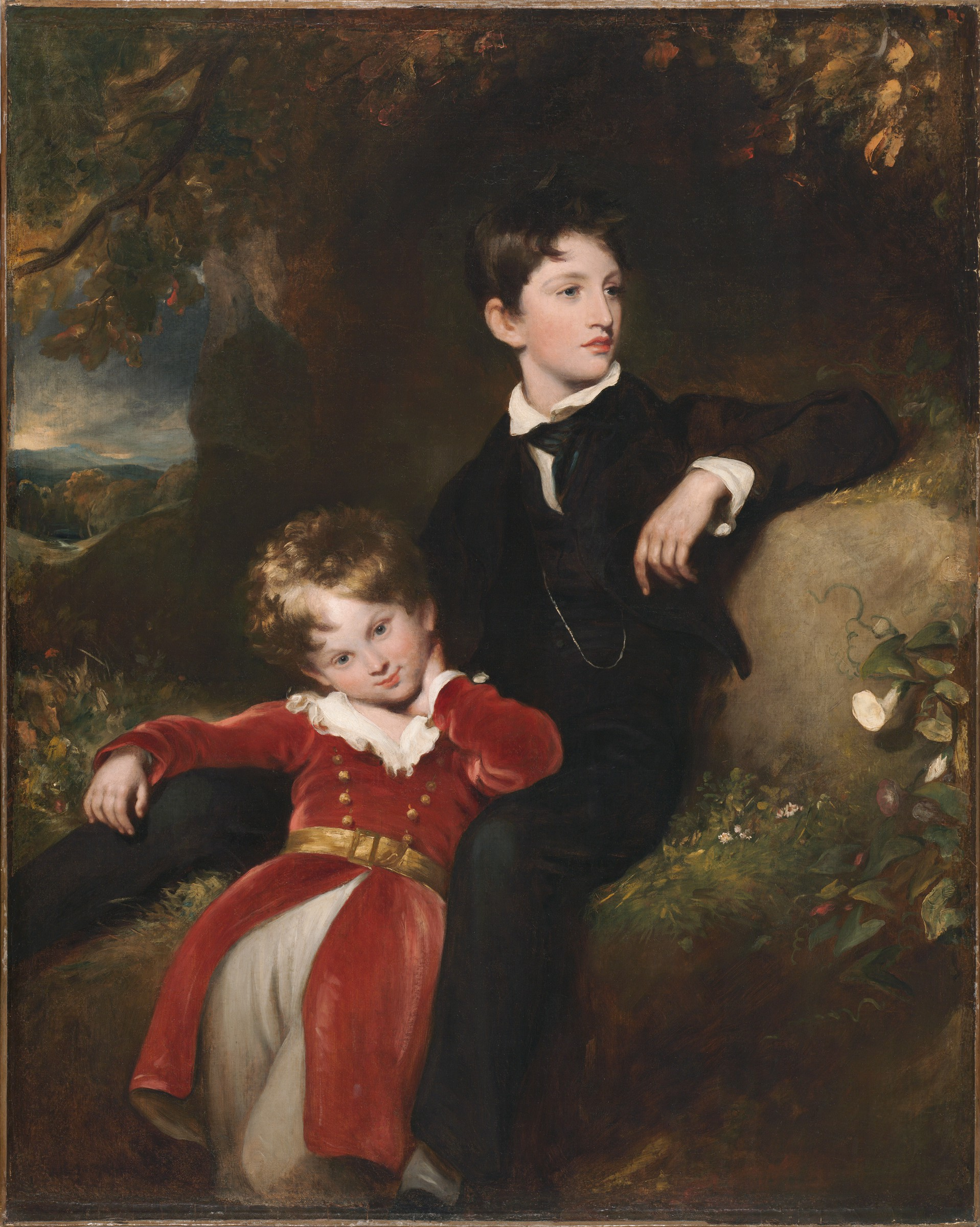
Stepbrothers Charles Stewart Hardinge age 6, and Walter Charles James age 13 in 1829

Parliament of the United Kingdom
Preceded by Richard Ker	Member of Parliament for Downpatrick; 1851–1856	Succeeded by Richard Ker
Political offices
Preceded by Sir John Ramsden, Bt.	Under-Secretary of State for War; March 1858 – March 1859	Succeeded by The Earl of Rosslyn
Peerage of the United Kingdom
Preceded by Henry Hardinge	Viscount Hardinge; 1856–1894	Succeeded by Henry Charles Hardinge
