= Edmund Hardinge =

English cricketer and Hardinge baronet

Sir Edmund Stracey Hardinge, 4th Baronet DL (27 March 1833 – 8 April 1924) was the fourth of the Hardinge baronets and a first-class cricketer who played a single match for Kent County Cricket Club in 1861.

== Early life ==
Hardinge was born at Bidborough in Kent in 1833, the second son of Reverend Sir Charles Hardinge, 2nd Baronet, and Emily Bradford Callander. He was educated at Tonbridge School, where he played cricket in the school XI, and at University College, Oxford.

== Cricket ==
Despite playing club cricket regularly and being rated in the 1907 History of Kent County Cricket as a "hard hitter", "fast bowler with a low delivery" and a "good fieldsman", Hardinge's only First XI match was for Kent against Sussex at Tunbridge Wells in 1861. He played club cricket for Sevenoaks Vine and Bluemantles and played some minor matches for the Gentlemen of Kent. He was a member of the General Committee of Kent County Cricket Club between 1879 and 1881, his brother having been a vice-president of the club.

== Family and later life ==
His elder brother Henry succeeded to the baronetcy in 1864. Following his brother's death in 1873, Hardinge inherited the family baronetcy and widespread property interests. He served as a magistrate and Deputy Lieutenant in Kent. Throughout his adult life he lived at South Park in Penshurst, at Chiddingstone and in 1901 was living at Cheshunt. In 1877 he married Evelyn Stuart Maberly, daughter of Major General Evan Maberley, and the couple had four children, including one son Charles who became the 5th Baronet. His property interests were in Hertfordshire and at Ketton Hall in County Durham, where the Durham Ox had been bred a century earlier.

Hardige died at Kensington in London in 1924. He was aged 91.

== Bibliography ==
- Carlaw, Derek (2020). Kent County Cricketers, A to Z: Part One (1806–1914) (PDF). Cardiff: ACS.

Baronetage of the United Kingdom
Preceded by Henry Hardinge	Baronet (of Belle Isle); 1873–1924	Succeeded by Charles Hardinge
