= Baron Dunleath =

Title in the Peerage of the United Kingdom

Baron Dunleath, of Ballywalter in the County of Down, is a title in the Peerage of the United Kingdom. It was created on 29 August 1892 for the businessman and former Conservative Member of Parliament for Downpatrick, John Mulholland. The Mulholland family were involved in the cotton and linen industry in Ulster in the north of Ireland. The first Baron's son, the second Baron, represented Londonderry North in the House of Commons as a Conservative. His grandson, the fourth Baron, was a member of the Northern Ireland Assembly for the Alliance Party. He was succeeded by his first cousin, the fifth Baron, who had already succeeded his father as second Baronet of Ballyscullion (see below). As of 2017 the titles are held by the fifth Baron's son, the sixth Baron, who succeeded in 1997.

The Mulholland Baronetcy, of Ballyscullion Park in the County of Londonderry, was created in the Baronetage of the United Kingdom on 3 July 1945 for the Hon. Henry Mulholland. He was the third son of the second Baron Dunleath and notably served as Speaker of the House of Commons of Northern Ireland. He was succeeded by his son, the aforementioned second Baronet, who in 1993 succeeded his cousin as fifth Baron Dunleath.

The family seat is Ballywalter Park, near Newtownards, County Down in Northern Ireland.

== Barons Dunleath (1892) ==
- John Mulholland, 1st Baron Dunleath (1819–1895)
- Henry Lyle Mulholland, 2nd Baron Dunleath (1854–1931)
- Charles Henry George Mulholland, 3rd Baron Dunleath (1886–1956)
- Charles Edward Henry John Mulholland, 4th Baron Dunleath (1933–1993)
- Michael Henry Mulholland, 5th Baron Dunleath (1915–1997)
- Brian Henry Mulholland, 6th Baron Dunleath (b. 1950) and 3rd Baronet

The heir apparent is the present holder's son the Hon. Andrew Henry Mulholland (b. 1981).

== Mulholland Baronets, of Ballyscullion (1945) ==
- Sir Henry George Hill Mulholland, 1st Baronet (1888–1971)
- Sir Michael Henry Mulholland, 2nd Baronet (1915–1997) (succeeded as Baron Dunleath in 1993)

see above for further succession
