= Liberal Repealer =

Irish liberal supporters for repealing 1801 Act of Union

A Liberal Repealer was a Liberal in Ireland, who supported the campaign of Daniel O'Connell for the repeal of the Act of Union 1801 and the re-creation of the Kingdom of Ireland and Parliament of Ireland which had existed before the union.

At some elections repeal candidates stood as Liberal Repealers and at others as Repealers, to contest the 105 Irish seats in the United Kingdom House of Commons.

Members of Parliament elected (MPs after election petitions and by-elections following petitions)

- 1832 Repealers 42 (39)
- 1835 Liberal Repealers 34 (32)
- 1837 Liberal Repealers 34 (32)
- 1841 Repealers 20 (18)
- 1847 Repealers 36 (35)

== See also ==
- Repealer
- Repeal (Ireland)
- Repeal Association
- Irish Independent Opposition
