= Downpatrick (UK Parliament constituency) =

UK parliamentary constituency in Ireland, 1801–1885

- Former borough constituency for the House of Commons
- County: County Down
- Borough: Downpatrick

1801–1885
- Seats: 1
- Created from: Downpatrick
- Replaced by: East Down

Downpatrick was a United Kingdom Parliament constituency in Ireland, returning one MP from 1801 to 1885.

== History and boundaries ==
Downpatrick was an original constituency represented in Parliament when the Union of Great Britain and Ireland took effect on 1 January 1801.

This constituency was the parliamentary borough of Downpatrick in County Down. In December 1831, boundary commissioners proposed boundaries for the borough. It was defined by the Parliamentary Boundaries (Ireland) Act 1832 as "The Demesne of Down".

The borough was disfranchised under the Redistribution of Seats Act 1885, which took effect at the 1885 general election.

== Members of Parliament ==
Election	Member	Party	Note
1801, January 1	Clotworthy Rowley		1801: Co-opted. Appointed Commissioner of Compensation.
1801, March 10	Samuel Campbell Rowley		
1802, July 17	Charles Stewart Hawthorne		
1806, November 18	Edward Southwell Ruthven	Whig	^{1}
1807, May 22	John Wilson Croker	Tory	^{1}
1812, October 20	Charles Stewart Hawthorne	Whig	Appointed a Commissioner of Excise in Ireland
1815, March 9	Viscount Glerawley	Tory	
1818, August 4	Viscount Glerawley	Tory	
1820, March 28	John Waring Maxwell	Tory	
1826, July 25	John Waring Maxwell	Tory	
1830, August 7	Edward Southwell Ruthven	Whig	
1831, June 14	Edward Southwell Ruthven	Whig	
1832, December 13	John Waring Maxwell	Tory	
1834, December	John Waring Maxwell	Conservative	
1835, January 9	David Ker	Conservative	
1837, July/August	David Ker	Conservative	
1841, July 2	David Stewart Ker	Conservative	
1847, August 4	Richard Ker	Peelite	Resigned
1851, August 8	Hon. Charles Hardinge	Conservative	Became the 2nd Viscount Hardinge, 24 September 1856
1852, July	Hon. Charles Hardinge	Conservative	Became the 2nd Viscount Hardinge, 24 September 1856
1857, February 12	Richard Ker	Peelite ^{3}	
1857, March/April	Richard Ker	Peelite ^{3}	
1859, May 3	David Stewart Ker	Conservative	
1865, July	David Stewart Ker	Conservative	Resigned
1867, August 5	William Keown	Conservative	
1868, Nov/Dec	William Keown	Conservative	
1874, February 2	John Mulholland	Conservative	Last MP for the constituency
1885	Constituency abolished		

Supplemental notes

1. Stooks Smith suggests that after the 1806 election there was a petition, which led to Edward Southwell Ruthven (Whig) being unseated and John Wilson Croker {Tory} being declared duly elected. Walker does not make any reference to such a petition.
2. Walker (like F. W. S. Craig in his compilations of election results for Great Britain) classifies Tory candidates as Conservatives from 1832. The name Conservative was gradually adopted as a description for the Tories. The party is deemed to be named Conservative from the 1835 general election.
3. Walker (like F. W. S. Craig in his compilations of election results for Great Britain) classifies Whig, Radical and similar candidates as Liberals from 1832. The name Liberal was gradually adopted as a description for the Whigs and politicians allied with them, before the formal creation of the Liberal Party shortly after the 1859 general election.

== Elections ==
=== Elections in the 1830s ===
General election 1830: Downpatrick
Party	Candidate	Votes	%
Whig	Edward Southwell Ruthven	Unopposed	
Registered electors		c. 400	
Whig gain from Tory			

General election 1831: Downpatrick
Party	Candidate	Votes	%
Whig	Edward Southwell Ruthven	219	57.9
Tory	Cospatrick Home	159	42.1
Majority		60	15.8
Turnout		378	c. 94.5
Registered electors		c. 400	
Whig hold			

General election 1832: Downpatrick
Party	Candidate	Votes	%
Tory	John Waring Maxwell	Unopposed	
Registered electors		517	
Tory gain from Whig			

General election 1835: Downpatrick
Party	Candidate	Votes	%
Conservative	David Guardi Ker	Unopposed	
Registered electors		525	
Conservative hold			

General election 1837: Downpatrick
Party	Candidate	Votes	%
Conservative	David Guardi Ker	154	51.0
Conservative	John Keown	140	46.4
Radical	Robert Thompson	5	1.7
Radical	James Christie Whyte	3	1.0
Majority		14	4.6
Turnout		302	52.1
Registered electors		580	
Conservative hold			

=== Elections in the 1840s ===
General election 1841: Downpatrick
Party	Candidate	Votes	%	±%
Conservative	David Stewart Ker	Unopposed		
Registered electors		342		
Conservative hold				

General election 1847: Downpatrick
Party	Candidate	Votes	%	±%
Peelite	Richard Ker	Unopposed		
Registered electors		385		
Peelite gain from Conservative				

=== Elections in the 1850s ===
Ker resigned by accepting the office of Steward of the Chiltern Hundreds, causing a by-election.

By-election, 8 August 1851: Downpatrick
Party	Candidate	Votes	%	±%
Conservative	Charles Hardinge	Unopposed		
Conservative gain from Peelite				

General election 1852: Downpatrick
Party	Candidate	Votes	%	±%
Conservative	Charles Hardinge	Unopposed		
Registered electors		236		
Conservative gain from Peelite				

Hardinge succeeded to the peerage, becoming 2nd Viscount Hardinge and causing a by-election.

By-election, 12 February 1857: Downpatrick
Party	Candidate	Votes	%	±%
Peelite	Richard Ker	129	99.2	New
Conservative	William Johnston	1	0.8	N/A
Majority		128	98.4	N/A
Turnout		130	66.3	N/A
Registered electors		196		
Peelite gain from Conservative		Swing	N/A	

General election 1857: Downpatrick
Party	Candidate	Votes	%	±%
Peelite	Richard Ker	Unopposed		
Registered electors		196		
Peelite gain from Conservative				

General election 1859: Downpatrick
Party	Candidate	Votes	%	±%
Conservative	David Stewart Ker	Unopposed		
Registered electors		199		
Conservative gain from Peelite				

=== Elections in the 1860s ===
General election 1865: Downpatrick
Party	Candidate	Votes	%	±%
Conservative	David Stewart Ker	Unopposed		
Registered electors		230		
Conservative hold				

Ker resigned, causing a by-election.

By-election, 5 August 1867: Downpatrick
Party	Candidate	Votes	%	±%
Conservative	William Keown	Unopposed		
Conservative hold				

General election 1868: Downpatrick
Party	Candidate	Votes	%	±%
Conservative	William Keown	Unopposed		
Registered electors		241		
Conservative hold				

=== Elections in the 1870s ===
General election 1874: Downpatrick
Party	Candidate	Votes	%	±%
Conservative	John Mulholland	Unopposed		
Registered electors		239		
Conservative hold				

=== Elections in the 1880s ===
General election 1880: Downpatrick
Party	Candidate	Votes	%	±%
Conservative	John Mulholland	176	64.0	N/A
Liberal	Alexander Fraser	99	36.0	New
Majority		77	28.0	N/A
Turnout		275	90.5	N/A
Registered electors		304		
Conservative hold		Swing	N/A	
