= David Guardi Ker =

Irish politician

Member of Parliament for Downpatrick
- In office 1835–1841

Member of Parliament for Athlone
- In office 1820–1826

Personal details
- Born: c. 1778
- Died: 30 December 1844 (aged 65–66)
- Party: Tory
- Spouse: Selina Stewart (m. 1814)
- Children: Richard and David
- Relatives: Robert Stewart (father-in-law); Robert Stewart (brother-in-law); John Waring Maxwell (brother-in-law)
- Education: Christ Church, Oxford

David Guardi Ker (c. 1778 – 30 December 1844) was an Irish landowner and politician, who represented Athlone in Parliament, 1820–26, and Downpatrick, 1835–41.

== Biography ==
Ker was born circa 1778, the son of David Ker, a landowner in County Down, and his wife Maddalena Guardi. A family tradition identified her as a Venetian singer, daughter of the artist Francesco Guardi, whom Ker's father had met and eloped with whilst on the Grand Tour. His father's brother, Richard Gervas Ker, was MP for Newport in 1802–06. He was educated at Eton College, Christ Church, Oxford, and the Inner Temple. In 1814 he married Lady Selina Stewart (1786–1871), daughter of Robert Stewart, 1st Marquess of Londonderry and sister of Robert Stewart, Viscount Castlereagh.

Ker was keen to enter Parliament at the 1820 general election, but supported his brother-in-law John Waring Maxwell for the candidacy at Downpatrick, where he had been expected to stand. He was returned shortly afterwards at a by-election in Athlone as a Tory. He stood down at the 1826 general election to make way for Richard Handcock, a nephew of Lord Castlemaine, the patron of the seat. He had supported the government, but remained neutral on Catholic relief.

In the 1835 general election he was returned unopposed for Downpatrick, where his family's estates were concentrated, and held the seat until he stood down at the 1841 general election.

Ker died in December 1844. Both of his two sons became Members of Parliament for Downpatrick; Richard Ker in 1847-51 and 1857–59, and David Stewart Ker in 1859–67.
