= Francis Mowatt =

British civil servant (1837-1919)

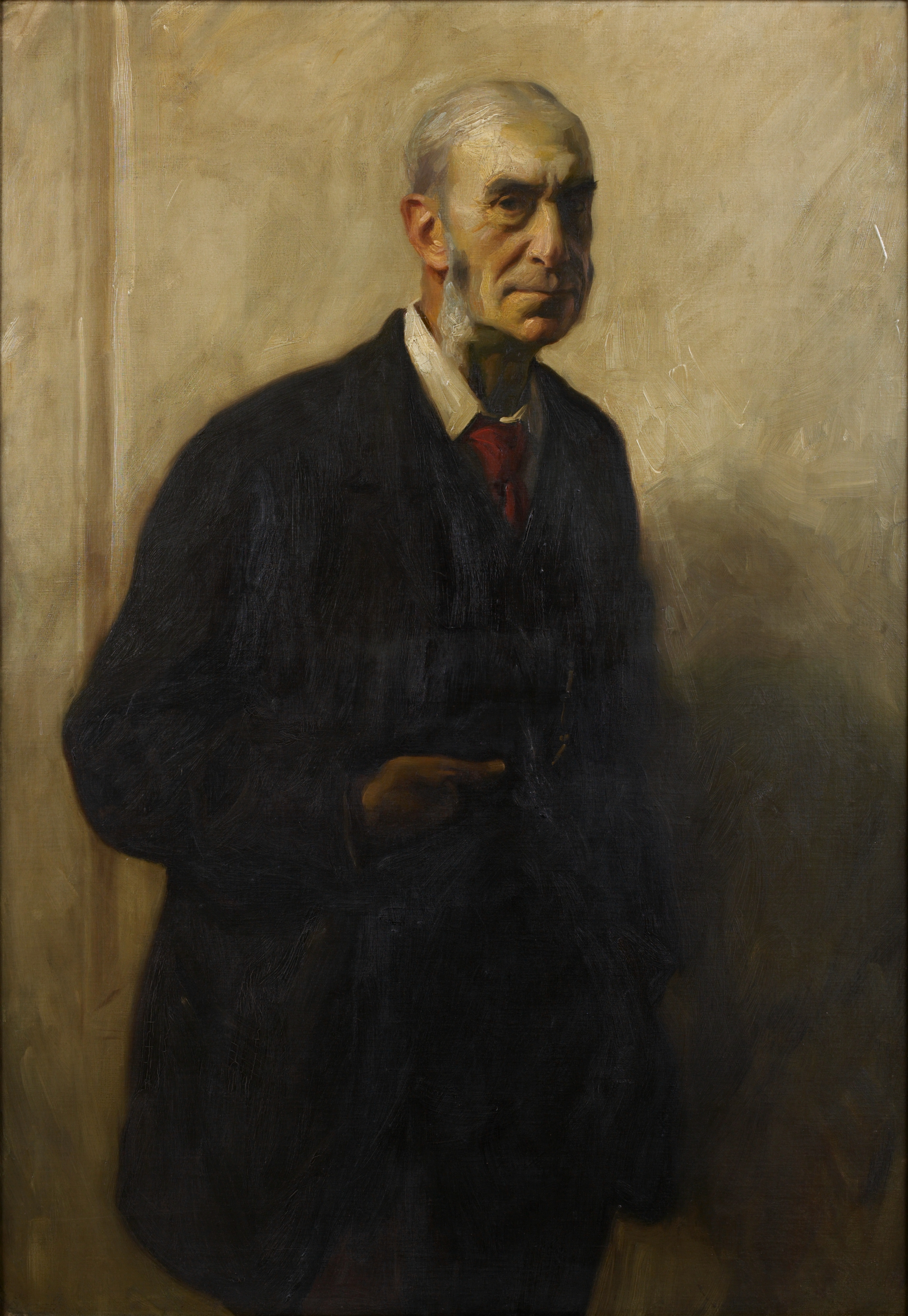
Portrait by Charles Wellington Furse, 1904

Sir Francis Mowatt GCB PC (28 April 1837 – 20 November 1919) was a British civil servant and politician. He was a radical and Liberal civil servant at the Head of the Treasury. His influence was felt at a time of expansion in governmental activities. Later, he was Alderman of the London County Council.

== Early life ==
Mowatt was born in Sydney, Australia, on 28 April 1837. His father Francis Mowatt (1803–1891) was a Member of Parliament from Falmouth. His mother was Sarah Sophia, the daughter of Captain George Barnes of Romford, who was part of the marine services of the British East India Company. Mowatt's sister married Vernon Lushington, a permanent secretary to the Admiralty.

Mowatt was educated at Harrow School from 1851 to 1853, followed by Winchester College in 1855. He then attended St John's College, Oxford from 1855 to 1856. He was a treasury clerkship scholar. In one of the first civil service exams taken, he scored 880 marks out of 1545.

== Career ==
Mowatt started his career in the British civil service as a third-class clerk and was paid £100 with an appraisal of £250. At his previous work, he controlled expenditure at the Treasury. He was promoted to a second clerk in 1860, with a salary of £430 in 1864. He was promoted to a first-class clerk in 1870 in the Assistant Secretary Division with a salary of £700 to £900. Mowatt was made principal clerk of the Law Division in 1881. He rose to deputy head of department in July 1889 and assistant secretary and auditor of the civil list, on a yearly salary of £1500.

Mowatt became Permanent Secretary to the Treasury in 1895. Haldane required Mowatt and John Morley to join him on his trip to Ireland in 1898 to sort out the Catholic universities. Haldane later praised the "far-sighted Permanent head of Treasury in founding the Imperial College of Science and Technology..." Mowatt was appointed the first chairman of Imperial before it was reconstructed, but retired due to ill-health. He stayed on in the civil service until 1903, sharing with Sir Edward Hamilton as Joint Permanent Administrative Secretary; while Hamilton was joint secretary in charge of finance.

A crisis hit the Conservatives in 1902-3 when Joseph Chamberlain decided to split the cabinet by proposing the Tariff Reform League, giving preferential trading terms to the colonies, particularly in Canadian North America. As Permanent Secretary, Mowatt was supposed to remain neutral and impartial, but he was an even more passionate Gladstonian free trade liberal than his predecessor, Sir F. Welby. In August 1903, Mowatt wrote to Haldane that the Duke of Devonshire was prepared to set up a new ministry of Unionists with Haldane in the Foreign Office to defend Free Trade.

The Chancellor of the Exchequer, Charles Thomson Ritchie, wanted to repeal the Corn Duty that had been imposed for the first time since 1846 by his predecessor Michael Hicks Beach. Mowatt interfered on Ritchie's behalf, compromising his position. Mowatt was photographed on the streets in London remonstrating toe to toe with Chamberlain. He trained Winston Churchill at the Board of Trade to be a free trader, stimulating a defection to the Liberal Party in 1904. Arthur Balfour was unimpressed with Mowatt's policy-making and bias.

On retirement, Mowatt became an Alderman of the London County Council. He served on Royal Commissions and Official Committees.

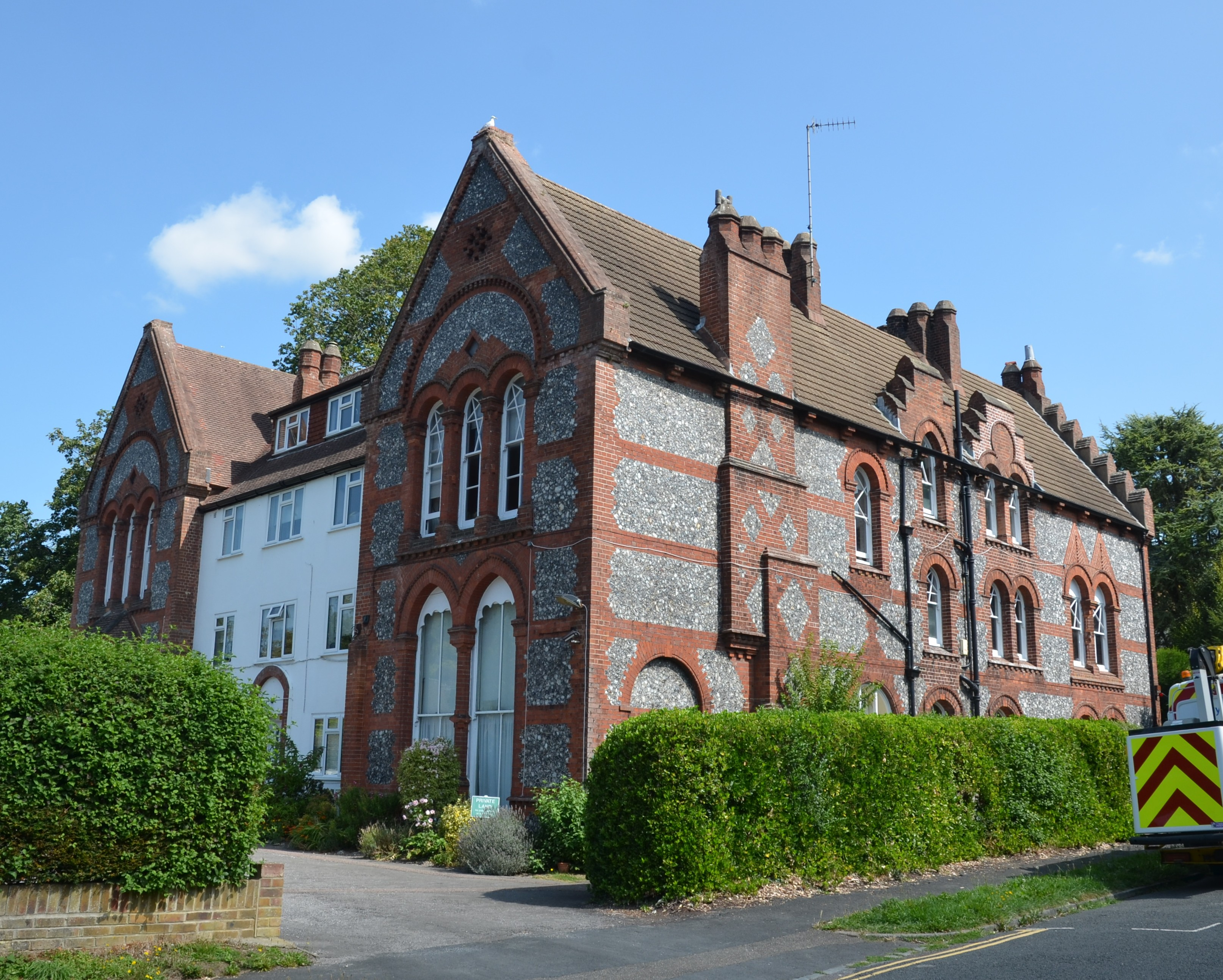
Withdean Hall, Brighton, Mowatt's home from 1875

== Honors ==
Mowatt was awarded a Companion of the Bath in 1884. He was made a Knight Commander of the Bath (KCB) in 1893. Sir Francis was created a GCB in 1901.

== Personal life ==
On 9 June 1864, Mowatt married Lucy Sophia. She was a daughter of John Andrew Freriche of Thirlestaine Hall, Cheltenham, and a widow of Count Stenbock, of Kolk, Estonia.

As a pastime, Mowatt followed the South Downs Hunt at Parham. He was living at 41 Sloane Gardens, Chelsea, SW, when he died on 20 November 1919.
