= John Mulholland, 1st Baron Dunleath =

Irish businessman and Member of Parliament

The Right Honourable The Lord Dunleath DL

Member of Parliament for Downpatrick
- In office 1874–1885
- Preceded by: William Keown
- Succeeded by: Constituency abolished

Personal details
- Born: John Mulholland; 16 December 1819
- Died: 11 December 1895 (aged 75)
- Party: Conservative
- Spouse: Frances Louisa Lyle (m. 1881)
- Relations: Charles Mulholland, 4th Baron Dunleath (grandson); Monica Wichfeld (granddaughter); Andrew Mulholland (grandfather)
- Children: 5
- Parent: Andrew Mulholland

John Mulholland, 1st Baron Dunleath DL (16 December 1819 – 11 December 1895) was an Irish businessman and Conservative Member of Parliament.

== Early life ==
Dunleath was born the son of Elizabeth MacDonnell (a daughter of Thomas MacDonnell of Belfast) and Andrew Mulholland, a future Mayor of Belfast, of Ballywalter Park in County Down.

== Career ==
He was involved in the Mulholland family cotton and linen industry and also represented Downpatrick in the British House of Commons from 1874 to 1885.

In 1892, he was raised to the peerage as Baron Dunleath, of Ballywalter in the County of Down.

== Sailing ==
Dunleath had great personal interest in sailing, according to the Introduction to the Dunleith Papers held at the Public Record Office of Northern Ireland (PRONI).

The 77 ft schooner Egeria was built for him in 1865 by Wanhill's Yard of Hamworthy, raced successfully for many years, and was retained and sailed by his son, Henry.

In 1866 he became Vice-Commodore of the Royal Ulster Yacht Club.

== Personal life ==
In 1851, Lord Dunleath was married to Frances Louisa Lyle (d. 1909), daughter of Hugh Lyle and Harriet Cromie (a daughter of John Cromie) of Knocktarna in County Londonderry. Together, they were the parents of:

- Hon. Andrew Walter Mulholland, who married Hon. Amy Harriet Lubbock, daughter of the 1st Baron Avebury, in 1877, three months before his death.
- Henry Lyle Mulholland, 2nd Baron Dunleath, who married Norah Louisa Fanny Ward, a granddaughter of both the 3rd Viscount Bangor and Lord George Hill, in 1881.
- Hon. Alfred John Mulholland, who married Mabel Charlotte Saunderson.
- Hon. Alice Elizabeth Mulholland, who married John George Beresford Massy-Beresford.
- Hon. Helen Mary Mulholland, who married Sir George Herbert Murray (their great-grandson was the 10th Duke of Atholl).
- Hon. Louisa Frances Mulholland, who married Edward Roger Murray Pratt.

He died in December 1895, aged 75, and was succeeded in the barony by his second son Henry. Lady Dunleath died in 1909.

Parliament of the United Kingdom
| Preceded by William Keown | Member of Parliament for Downpatrick; 1874–1885 | Constituency abolished |
Peerage of the United Kingdom
| New title | Baron Dunleath; 1892–1895 | Succeeded by Henry Lyle Mulholland |
