= Andrew Mulholland =

Northern Irish cotton and linen manufacturer

Andrew Mulholland (1791 – 24 August 1866), was an Irish cotton and linen manufacturer.

== Biography ==
He was born in Belfast in 1791, the son of Thomas Mulholland, a cotton manufacturer who founded the company of Messrs. Thomas Mulholland & Co. of Union Street, Belfast. Andrew joined his father's company and took over with his brother when Thomas died, renaming the company Messrs. T. & A. Mulholland.

Andrew realised that the supply of flax yarn being made by hand was quite insufficient to meet the demands of the Belfast spinners and that flax was being shipped across to Manchester to be spun and reimported as yarn. He therefore established in 1828 a small mill flax-spinning mill in St. James's Street and subsequently converted their York Street mill (recently rebuilt after a fire) to serve the same purpose.

After the death of his brother Andrew carried on the business alone and for some years enjoyed very profitable results from having a near monopoly in the flax-spinning industry. The firm still remains one of the principal businesses in Belfast.

When Belfast was incorporated in 1842 Andrew became a member of the council, was elected the third Mayor in 1845, and presented the town with the organ in Ulster Hall at a cost of £3,000. He established a home in Springvale, Ballywalter, co. Down and served as High Sheriff of Down for 1855-56 and as High Sheriff of Antrim for 1858-59. He retired in 1860 and subsequently became a justice of the peace and Deputy Lieutenant.

He died at Springvale on 24 August 1866, aged 73. He had married in 1817 Eliza, the daughter of Thomas McDonnell of Belfast. Their eldest son, John (b. 1819) became Member of Parliament for co. Down in 1874, sat for Downpatrick from 1880 to 1885, and was in 1892 created Baron Dunleath of Ballywalter.

Civic offices
Preceded by John Dunbar	Mayor of Belfast; 1845–1846	Succeeded by John Kane
