= John Waring Maxwell =

Irish politician (1788 – 1869)

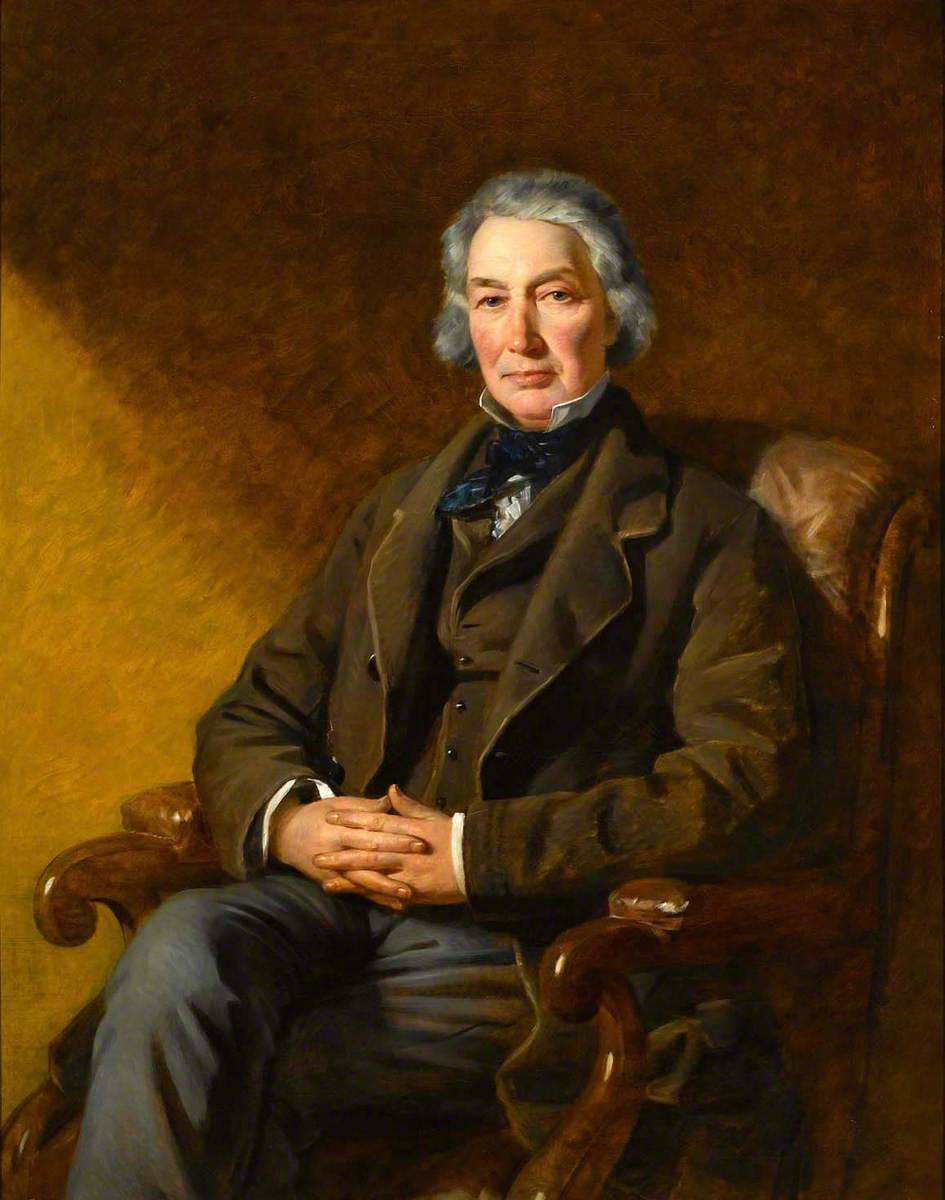
Image of John Waring Maxwell

John Waring Maxwell (1788 – 22 December 1869) was an Irish politician.

Maxwell was born at Finnebrogue, in County Down. He married Madeleine Ker, and became a magistrate and a deputy lieutenant for the county. He stood as a Tory in the 1820 UK general election in Downpatrick, winning the seat. He held it at the 1826 UK general election, but was defeated in 1830. He stood again in 1832, regaining Downpatrick, but stood down in 1835.

Parliament of the United Kingdom
Preceded by William Annesley	Member of Parliament for Downpatrick; 1820 – 1830	Succeeded by Edward Southwell Ruthven
Preceded by Edward Southwell Ruthven	Member of Parliament for Downpatrick; 1832 – 1835	Succeeded by David Ker
