= Ballywalter =

Village on the Ards Peninsula, Northern Ireland

Coordinates: 54.53°N 5.48°W

Ballywalter: Irish: Baile Bháltair; Scots: Whitkirk
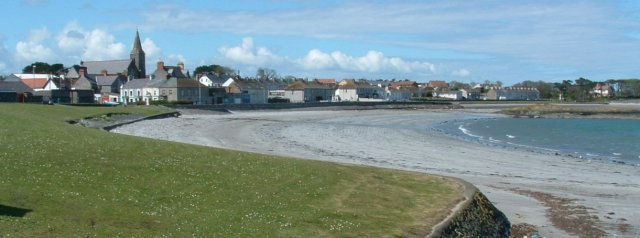

- Location within County Down
- Population: 2,027 (2011 census)
- District: Ards and North Down Borough
- County: County Down
- Country: Northern Ireland
- Sovereign state: United Kingdom
- Post town: NEWTOWNARDS
- Postcode district: BT22
- Dialling code: 028
- UK Parliament: Strangford
- NI Assembly: Strangford

Ballywalter (from Irish Baile 'homestead' and Walter) is a village or townland (of 437 acres or 177 hectares) and civil parish in County Down, Northern Ireland. It is on the east (Irish Sea) coast of the Ards Peninsula between Donaghadee and Ballyhalbert. Ballywalter was formerly known as Whitkirk as far back as the 12th century. It had a population of 2,027 people in the 2011 census.

== Etymology ==
The name of the village is derived from the Irish Baile Bhaltair meaning Walter's townland. This may have been a gaelicisation of Walter(s)ton. The name Walter was common among the Anglo-Normans who began to arrive in Ireland in the late 1100s. The taxation of Pope Nicholas IV known as Taxatio Ecclesiastica and compiled in 1291–1292 refers to Rector ville Walteri de Logan, i.e. 'the rector of Walter-de-Logan's town'.

== Places of interest ==
On the northern edge of Ballywalter is the townland of Whitechurch (which has been translated as Whitkirk in Ulster Scots). Within this townland is the Whitechurch graveyard, an important burial place. The oldest gravestone is to John Cooper who had emigrated from Scotland to Ireland in 1606. He died aged 90 in 1608. The graveyard also contains the graves of several United Irishmen who were killed in a battle in Newtownards in 1798. Inside the church, there is a headstone to Arthur Lusks who sailed around the world in 1753 with George Anson.

On the southern edge of the village is Ballywalter Park, open to the public by appointment. The house is the ancestral seat of The 6th Baron Dunleath. The park plays host to the Northern Ireland Game Fair, which has attracted nearly 40,000 people over a single weekend. Ballywalter Park is a Grade A listed stately home, deemed to be of exceptional architectural importance.

== History ==
=== Irish Rebellion of 1798 ===
On the morning of 10 June 1798 (known thereafter as "Pike Sunday"), a force of United Irishmen, mainly from Bangor, Donaghadee, Greyabbey and Ballywalter, attempted to occupy the town of Newtownards. They were met with musket fire from the market house and among those killed was James Cain, an 18-year-old male from Ballyferris outside Ballywalter. Cain was buried in Whitechurch graveyard.

The extent to which the people of Ballywalter were involved in the 1798 Rebellion is illustrated by an announcement in the Freeman's Journal on 11 August 1798, which stated:

"...the magnitude of the punishment of many districts of County Down may be conceived from this single fact-of the inhabitants of the little village of Ballywalter nine men were actually killed and thirteen returned wounded, victims of their folly. If a trifling village suffered so much what must have been the aggregate loss in those parts of the country which were in a state of rebellion."

A number of Presbyterian ministers in the Ards were deemed to have taken part in the rebellion and were tried, found guilty, and executed. Among the executed was a minister from near Ballywalter, Rev. Robert Goudy of Dunover. After the insurrection, bands of soldiers and yeomen scoured the country looking for United Irishmen. It is said locally that some Ballywalter men escaped capture by spending days at sea, hiding behind the Long Rock.

== Population ==
=== 2011 census ===
In the 2011 census, Ballywalter had a population of 2,027 people (874 households).

=== 2001 census ===
Ballywalter is classified as a village (a population between 1,000 and 2,250 people). On census day (29 April 2001) there were 1,416 people living in Ballywalter. Of these:

- 18.5 percent were aged under 16 years and 27.0 percent were aged 60 and over
- 48.9 percent of the population were male and 51.1 percent were female
- 1.0 percent were from a Catholic background and 95.7 percent were from a Protestant background
- 4.6 percent of persons aged 16–74 were unemployed
- 2.3 percent of inhabitants identified as neither male nor female

== Religion ==
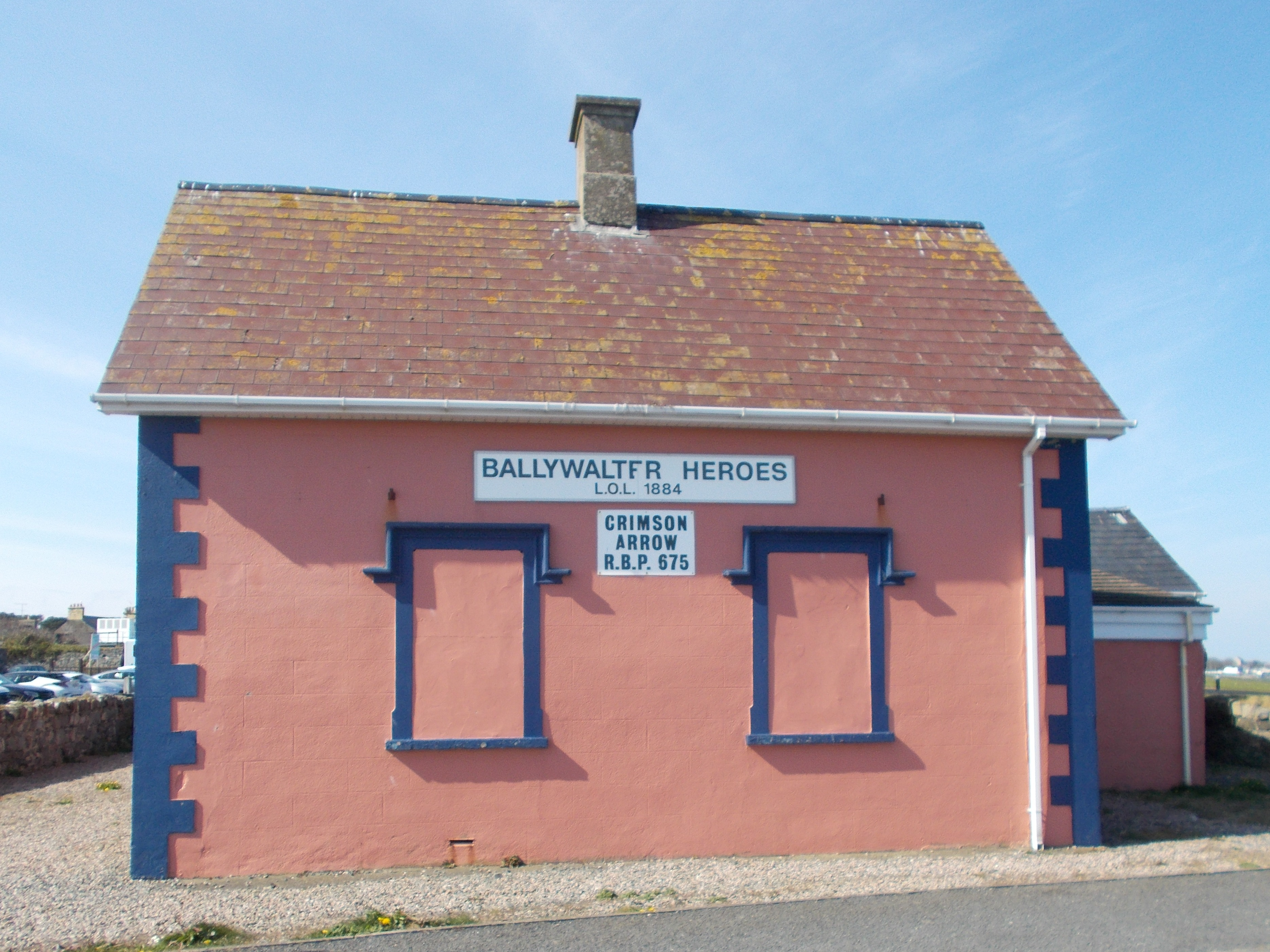
Ballywalter Orange Hall

The Ballywalter Parish of the Church of Ireland is part of the Area Deanery of Ards. Its church in the village is the Holy Trinity Church on the Whitechurch Road. There is also St. Andrew's church which is located at Balligan, south of the village.

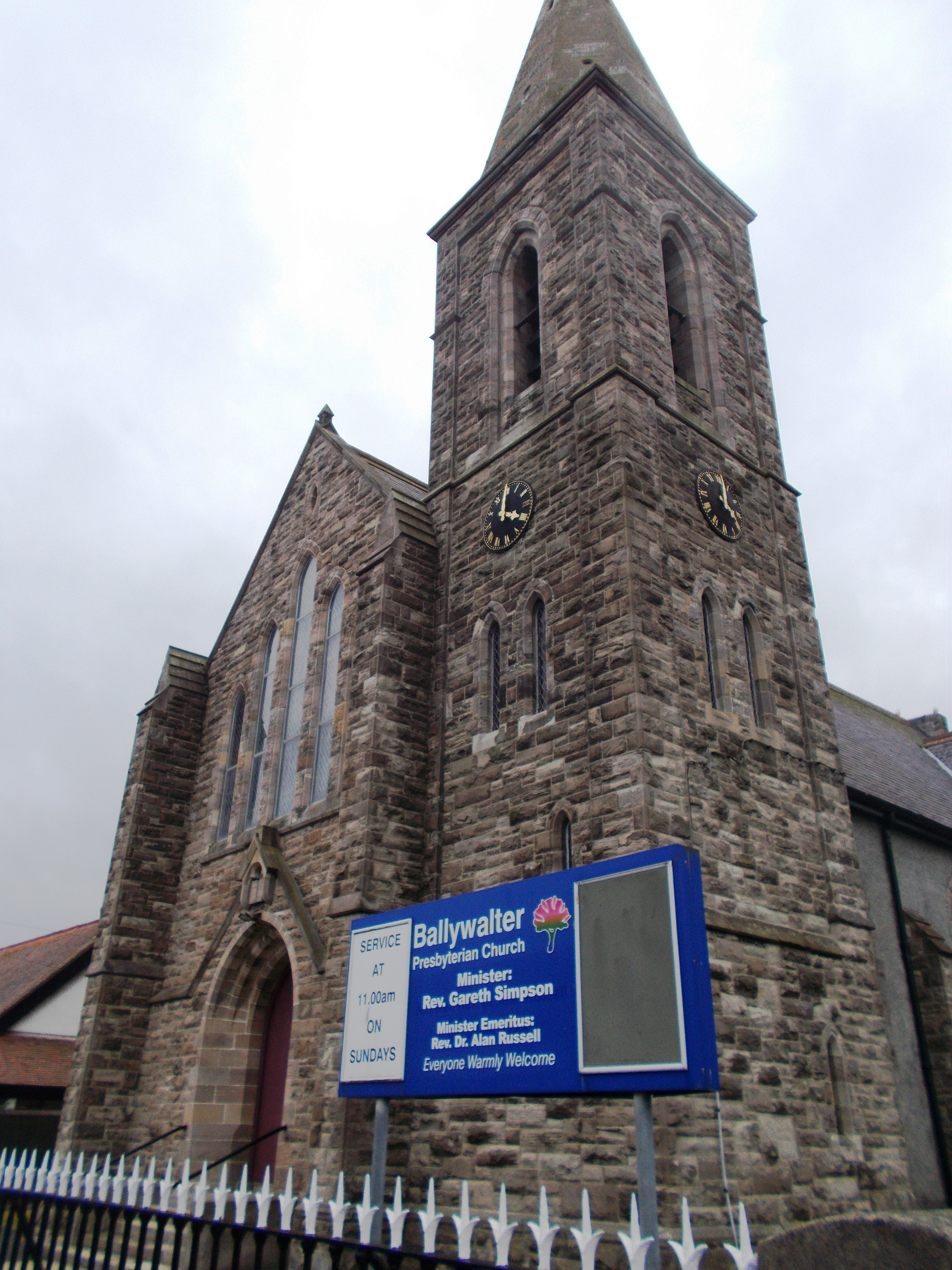
Ballywalter Presbyterian Church

The Ballywalter Presbyterian Church is situated in the Main Street. It is one of the oldest Presbyterian churches in Ireland being established in 1626.

A Loyal Orange Lodge, working under the authority of the Grand Orange Lodge of Ireland, sits in the Orange Hall, Main Street, Ballywalter. It takes the title of Ballywalter Heroes Loyal Orange Lodge, number 1884, and is itself part of the Upper Ards District LOL No 11, in the County Down Grand Orange Lodge. It was first formed in the village in the mid-19th century and has had continued membership to the present day.

== Sport ==
Ballywalter Recreation F.C. has become well known, due to the talent in the younger teams, right through to the runner-up league and cup team, the Ballywalter rec u17s.

== Notable people ==
- Thomas Jamison (c. 1753–1811), born in Ballywalter, became a surgeon, government official, mercantile trader and land owner in Sydney, Australia.
- Paul Rankin, celebrity chef, is from Ballywalter.

== Civil parish of Ballywalter ==
The civil parish of Ballywalter contains the village of the same name.

=== Townlands ===
The civil parish contains the following townlands:

- Ballyatwood
- Ballyferis
- Ballylimp
- Dunover
- Ganaway
- Springvale
- Whitechurch

== See also ==
- List of towns and villages in Northern Ireland
- List of civil parishes of County Down
